= Wiltshire Army Cadet Force =

Cadet force county of the United Kingdom

- Active: before June 1954–present
- Country: United Kingdom
- Branch: British Army: Army Cadet Force
- Type: Registered Volunteer Youth Organisation
- Role: To provide pre-training and experience of life in the British Army
- Size: County (Note: In the Army Cadet Force, a 'County' is equivalent to an army battalion)
- Part of: Headquarters South West
- County HQ: Devizes
- Website: Wiltshire Army Cadets

Insignia
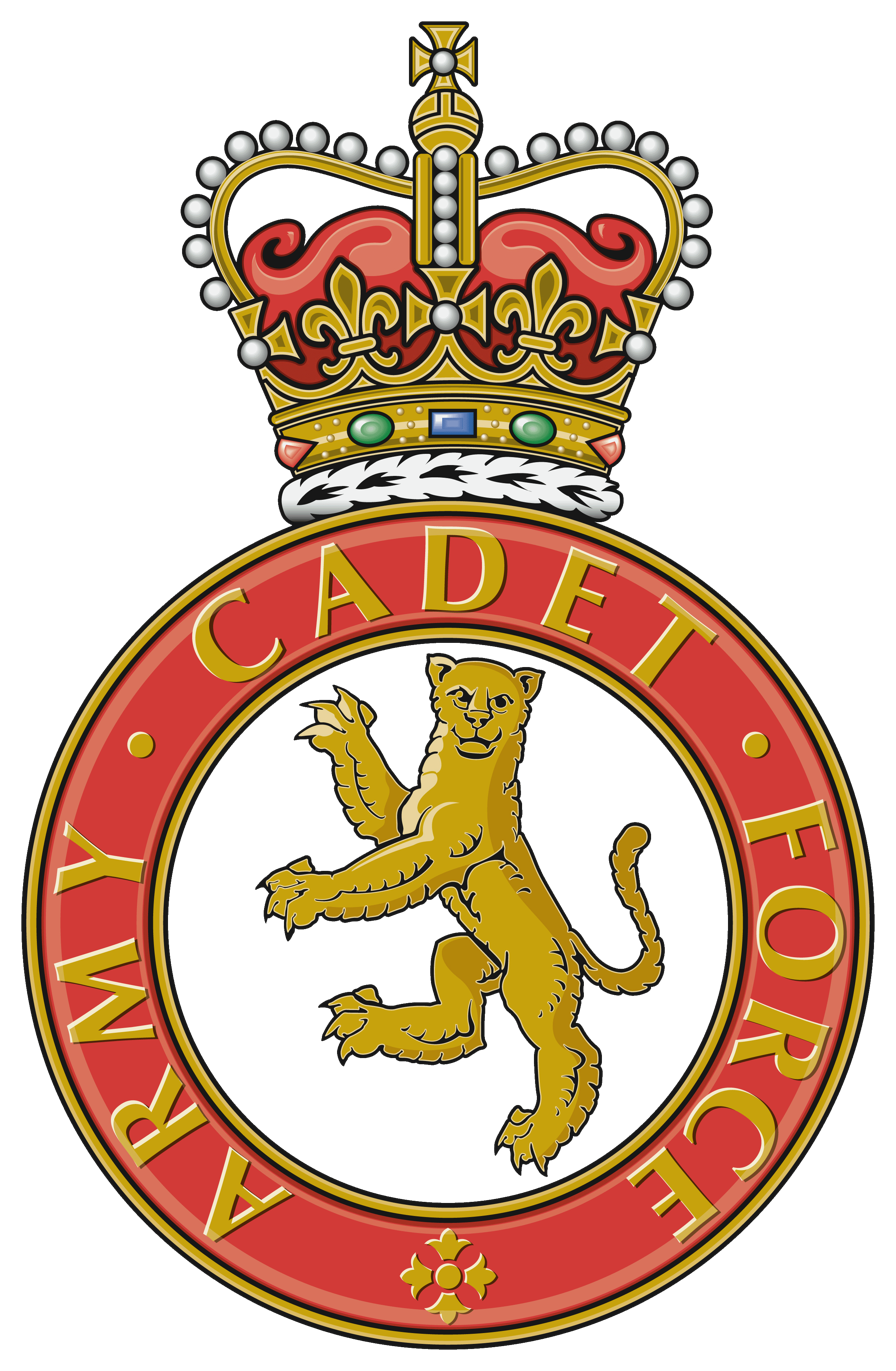
- Army Cadet Force Badge

The Wiltshire Army Cadet Force (Wiltshire ACF) is the county cadet force for Wiltshire, which operates as part of the Army Cadet Force. Since 2014, the county has been part of Headquarters South West and comprises three companies along with a county corps of drums.

== Background ==
In 1863, along with the formation of the Volunteer Force, the first government sanctioned cadet groups were allowed to be formed. These groups would mostly be formed in connection with existing volunteer companies and battalions. Following the Territorial and Reserve Forces Act 1907 which organised the former Volunteer Force into a coherent organisation, known as the Territorial Force (TF), the cadets were expanded. Each company consisted of no less than 30 cadets, and four of these companies formed a "Cadet Battalion", the predecessors to the modern "Cadet County".

Unlike their modern successors, the first cadet battalions were administered by their local County Territorial Force Associations, and rarely ever came under an "army command". However, following changes to the organisation of the Cadets, in 1923 all cadet forces were taken under complete control of the County Associations.

The first mention of the "Wiltshire Army Cadet Force" appears in a supplement to the London Gazette for 15 June 1954. The issue notes a chaplain 4th class, of the Royal Army Chaplains' Department transferring to the Dorset Army Cadet Force from the Wiltshire ACF effective 15 June 1954.

== Organisation ==
As of December 2021, the Wiltshire Army Cadet Force consists of appx. 700 cadets and 130 adult volunteers in 24 detachments. Each Army Cadet Force 'county' is in-fact a battalion, and each 'detachment' equivalent to that of a platoon. The county's is organised as follows:

- County Headquarters, Wiltshire Army Cadet Force, at Le Marchant Barracks, Devizes
- County Cadet Training Team, Wiltshire Army Cadet Force, at Le Marchant Barracks, Devizes

Detachment	Affiliation	Location
Sword Company
Swindon Academy		Beech Avenue, Swindon
Abbey Park School Detachment		Abbey Park School, Redhouse Way, Redhouse
Royal Wooton Basset Detachment		Jubilee Lake, Royal Wootton Bassett
Calne Detachment		Calne Cadet Centre, Bryans Close Road, Calne
Church Place Detachment		Swindon Army Reserve Centre, Church Place, Swindon
Dorcan Detachment		St Paul's Drive, Swindon
Abbeyfield Detachment		Abbeyfield School, Stanley Lane, Chippenham
Marlborough Detachment		Marlborough Cadet Centre, London Road, Marlborough
Corps of Drums & Bugles		UTC, Bristol Street, Swindon
Juno Company
Lavington Detachment		The Spring, Market Lavington, Lavington
Corsham Detachment		Building 160, Lysander Block, Westwells Road, Corsham
Colerne Detachment		Azimghur Barracks, Colerne
Devizes Detachment		Le Marchant Barracks, Franklyn Road, Devizes
Melksham Detachment		Melksham Cadet Hut, Riskin Avenue, Melksham
Trowbridge Detachment		Trowbridge Cadet Centre, Frome Road, Trowbridge
Warminster Detachment		Warminster Cadet Centre, Woodcock Lane, Warminster
Westbury Detachment		Westbury Cadet Centre, West End, Westbury
Gold Company
Bulford Detachment	Royal Corps of Signals	Ward/Wing Barracks, Bulford Camp, Bulford
Downton Detachment	Rifles	Downton Cadet Centre, Children's Corner, Downton
Larkhill Detachment	Royal Artillery	Larkhill Cadet Centre, Ross Road, Larkhill
Old Sarum Detachment	Rifles	Old Sarum Army Reserve Centre, Old Sarum
Sarum Academy Detachment	Royal Artillery	Sarum Academy, Westwood Road, Salisbury
Tidworth Detachment	Rifles	Saint Andrew's Hall, Tidworth Camp, Tidworth
Tisbury Detachment		Victoria Hall, High Street, Tisbury

== ACF Mission ==
The Army Cadet Force is a national, voluntary, uniformed youth organisation. It is sponsored by the British Army but not part of it and neither the cadets nor the adult volunteer leaders are subject to military call-up. They offer a broad range of challenging adventurous and educational activities, some of them on a military theme. Their aim is to inspire young people to achieve success in life and develop in them the qualities of a good citizen.

The ACF can be compared to their counterparts in the Junior Reserve Officers' Training Corps (USA), Hong Kong Adventure Corps, and Canadian Army Cadets, amongst others.

== See also ==
- List of Army Cadet Force units
- Combined Cadet Force
