= Policing in Wiltshire and Swindon =

Policing in the English county of Wiltshire (including the borough of Swindon) is the responsibility of several civilian and military authorities.

As a landlocked county, there are no seaports which would have Border Force officers. However, the National Crime Agency (NCA) operates throughout the UK.

As is customary in England and Wales, responsibility for policing in the county rests with the local Home Office territorial police force, Wiltshire Police, formerly Wiltshire Constabulary.

As there is a large military (mostly British Army) presence and MOD presence, the Royal Military Police and Ministry of Defence Police often work with the territorial force.

The railway stations are also policed by the national British Transport Police.

Some areas also have private security, or public officials, with various powers, such as Salisbury City Council which has a contract with a security company, Venture Security, to provide City Centre Security Officers (CCSO). These officers have been designated Community safety accreditation scheme (CSAS) powers by the Chief Constable of Wiltshire.

== List of police services ==
=== Civilian ===
- Wiltshire Police – the main, territorial Home Office police force, which polices all areas, including Swindon. It consists of a Special Constabulary, dog section, drone (UAV) unit, traffic police and community policing teams.
- Ministry of Defence Police (MDP) – a national, civilian police force that police the defence estate. Areas of specific responsibility include:
1. Corsham – MOD Corsham
2. Porton Down – which houses the Defence Science and Technology Laboratory
3. Salisbury Plain Training Area – a large military training area used extensively by the British Army since the 19th century (which has its own byelaws)
4. Garrison towns (in conjunction with RMP and Wiltshire Police) of Tidworth, Bulford, Larkhill and Warminster.
- British Transport Police (BTP) – police the railway stations, although their regional headquarters is in Bath, Somerset.
- National Crime Agency (NCA) – in October 2019, ITV News reported that: "The National Crime Agency (NCA) says Swindon is the most vulnerable town in the country to the problem [of county lines criminal activity]". The NCA is a national investigate body with a wide range of powers.

=== Military ===
- Royal Military Police (RMP) – the British Army's military police corps, part of the Adjutant General's Corps.
1. 1st Military Police Brigade (1 MP Bde), 158 Provost Company (158 Pro Coy) are based at Kiwi Barracks, Bulford Camp and police Bulford Garrison and surrounding garrison areas.
2. 1st Military Police Brigade (1 MP Bde), Special Investigation Branch Regiment (SIB RHQ) are based at Campion Lines, Bulford Camp.

=== Other ===
- Salisbury City Council – City Centre Security Officers patrol and protect the centre. They have CSAS powers and authority.
- Angling Trust – Volunteer Water Bailiffs, who work with the Environment Agency, anglers and Wiltshire Police to deter illegal fishing. They have no powers, unlike water bailiffs (sometimes called Fisheries Enforcement Officers), who work for the Environment Agency and have powers of a constable, under the Salmon and Freshwater Fisheries Act 1975.
