= Salisbury Plain Training Area =

British military training ground

- Salisbury Plain
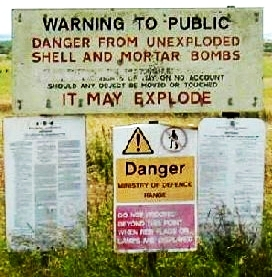
- Sign on Salisbury Plain

Site information
- Type: Training Area
- Owner: Ministry of Defence
- Controlled by: British Army

Location
- Location within Wiltshire
- Coordinates: 51.247°N 1.892°W

Site history
- Built for: War Office
- In use: 1898–present

The Salisbury Plain Training Area is a large expanse of land on Salisbury Plain in Wiltshire, England, which is managed by the Defence Infrastructure Organisation on behalf of the Ministry of Defence.

== History ==
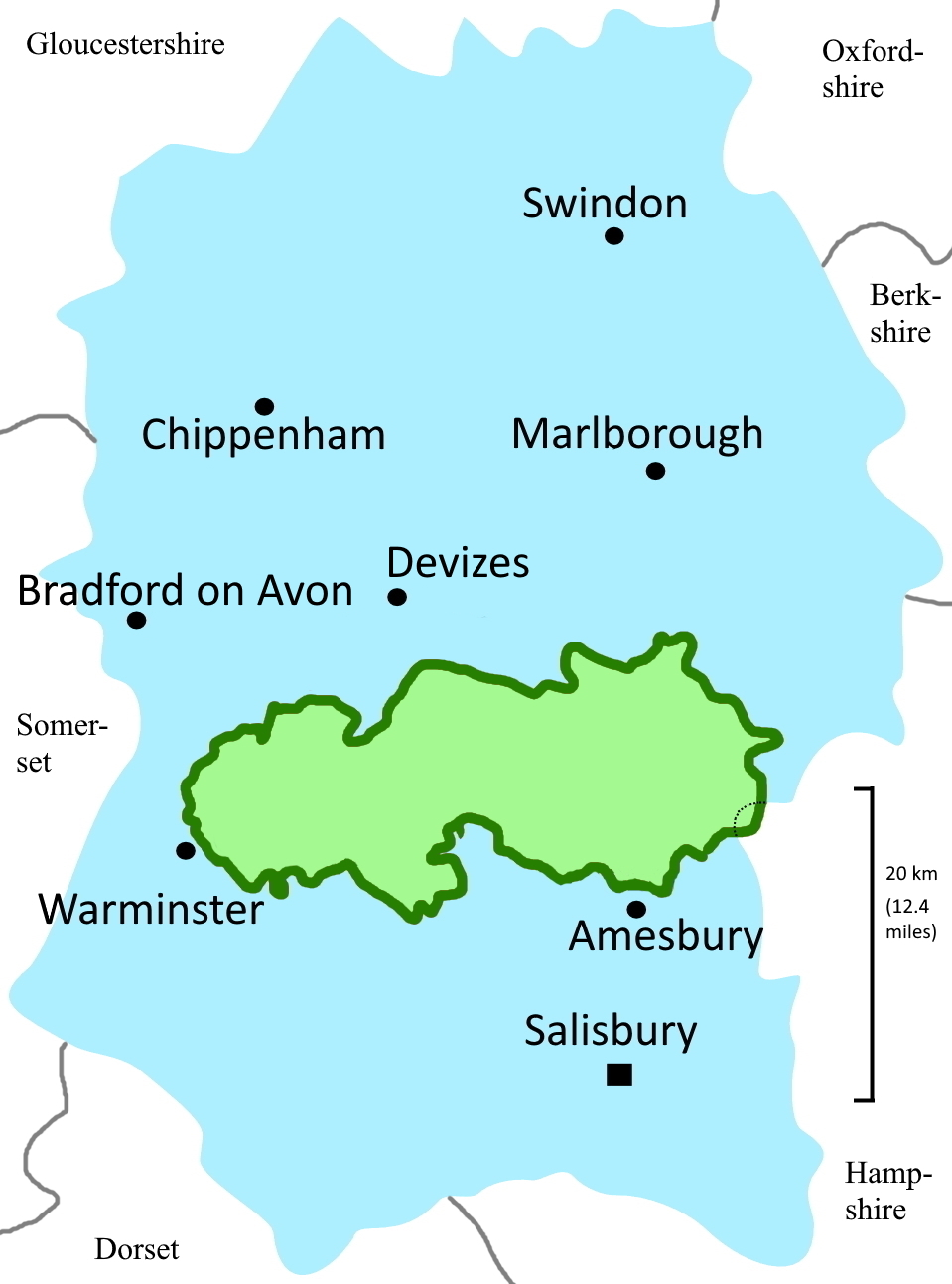
Rough map of military training area (green) on Salisbury Plain within Wiltshire (blue); it accounts for about half the area of Salisbury Plain

The British Army's Salisbury Plain Training Area covers roughly half of the plain (and makes up about 11% of Wiltshire). The army first conducted exercises on the plain in 1898. From that time, the Ministry of Defence bought up large areas of land until the Second World War. The MoD now own 150 square miles (390 km^{2}) of land, making it the largest military training area in the United Kingdom. Much of this land is let to farmers or grazed under licence, while around 47 square miles (120 km^{2}) (12,000 ha) are used for live firing, where public access is greatly restricted or permanently closed. The land and facilities are managed by the MoD's Defence Infrastructure Organisation.

The largest camps and barracks in or near the training area are at Larkhill, Bulford, Tidworth, Trenchard Lines (Upavon) and Waterloo Lines (Warminster). Copehill Down is an urban warfare training site. Several installations have been built and since removed, including the Stonehenge Aerodrome and Amesbury and Military Camp Light Railway. A grass aerodrome at Netheravon was used by the RAF until 1963, then by the Army Air Corps until 2012, and is now a tri-service installation.

The Royal School of Artillery has been based at Larkhill since 1915, and live firing is conducted on the plain for approximately 340 days of each year. In the early 2000s, military personnel from the UK and around the world spent some 600,000-man days on the plain every year.

In 1943, the village of Imber was evacuated to allow training for Operation Overlord to be conducted. The village, in an isolated position within the plain, has remained closed except for an annual church service and some bank holidays. Roads in the Imber area are also closed, as they lie within the Imber Range live firing area; it is possible to walk all 30 miles (48 km) of the perimeter of the range on public footpaths.

Keevil Airfield, a few miles north of the training area, is used by aircraft and helicopters during exercises. The training area is close to other military facilities including the Defence Science and Technology Laboratory at Porton Down (much of whose work is secret), Boscombe Down airfield, and Middle Wallop Army Air Corps Base in Hampshire, where pilots train on the Westland Apache.

BFBS Radio broadcasts from studios on Marlborough Road, Bulford, on DAB, FM and satellite channels.
