= General McQueen =

General McQueen may refer to:

- Adolph McQueen (fl. 1970s–2010s), U.S. Army major general
- John C. McQueen (1899–1985), U.S. Marine Corps lieutenant general
- Keith McQueen (1923–2000), British Army major general

== See also ==
- Thomas MacQueen (1792–1840), British Army general
