= Corran Purdon =

Irish army officer (1921–2018)

Major-General Corran Purdon CBE MC CPM
- Purdon at Merville Battery, June 2014
- Born: Corran William Brooke Purdon; 4 May 1921; Cobh, Ireland
- Died: 27 June 2018 (aged 97); Wiltshire, England
- Relatives: Terence Otway (cousin)
- Military career
- Allegiance: United Kingdom
- Branch: British Army
- Service years: 1939–1976
- Rank: Major-General
- Service number: 112917
- Units: Royal Ulster Rifles; No. 12 Commando; Sultan of Oman's Armed Forces; Hong Kong Police Force
- Commands: 1st Battalion, Royal Ulster Rifles; Sultan of Oman's Armed Forces; School of Infantry; North West District; Near East Land Forces
- Conflicts: Second World War; Indonesia–Malaysia confrontation Dhofar Rebellion
- Awards: Commander of the Order of the British Empire; Military Cross; Overseas Territories Police Medal; Colonial Police Medal; Chevalier dé la Légion d'Honneur; Médaille d’Honneur de St Nazaire

Major-General Corran William Brooke Purdon CBE MC CPM (4 May 1921 – 27 June 2018) was an Irish-born career soldier in the British Army, who took part in the raid on St Nazaire as a commando for which he was awarded the Military Cross. He was subsequently a prisoner in Colditz Castle.

== Early life ==
Purdon was born on 4 May 1921 in Rushbrooke, Cobh, near Cork, Ireland, during the Irish War of Independence. His father Major General William Purdon worked for the army as a medical officer and his mother Myrtle, from Belfast, was a homemaker. In his autobiography he referred to the family legend that they had their own Banshee which was rumoured to shriek whenever a family member was going to die. This, apparently, led to telegrams being dispatched to family members when the Banshee was heard to find out if everyone was alright.

In the early 1920s the family moved to India. In 1926, after his father completed his tour with the Indian Army, the family moved to Belfast. Purdon was educated firstly in India, then at Campbell College in Belfast and, finally, at the Royal Military Academy Sandhurst. In addition to obtaining an education at Campbell College, he also learned to play the bagpipes which he always considered an asset.

In 1939, when training in Scotland, Purdon met Patricia Petrie at a dance in Ayr. The couple were engaged within three weeks but did not marry until more than four years later.

== Career ==
=== Military career ===
Purdon was commissioned into the Royal Ulster Rifles in 1939 at the start of the Second World War. His training at Sandhurst was cut short and he was posted to the regimental depot in Armagh. Disappointed at being too young to receive an active service posting, he volunteered for No. 12 Commando which was formed in Crumlin, Northern Ireland on 5 August 1940, which the men marched to after gathering in Derry and Belfast. Following extensive training he was deployed with his unit as part of Operation Chariot on the raid on St Nazaire, for which he was awarded the Military Cross. Wounded by grenade shrapnel while trying to break out of the docks area he was captured and taken eventually to Oflag IX-A/H at Spangenberg Castle near Kassel. After a year of imprisonment, on 26 March 1943, Purdon and a comrade, Lieutenant Richard (Dick) Fuller Morgan escaped and were on the run for some days before recapture. Both were subsequently transferred (after being caught digging an escape tunnel) to Colditz Castle where they remained until 16 April 1945, when liberated by American forces. Joining one of the American sub-units both Purdon and Morgan re-joined the fighting until they were returned to Colditz for repatriation to the UK.

On his return to the UK, Purdon was persuaded to return to 1st Battalion Royal Ulster Rifles as adjutant with the rank of captain. His unit was based at Kiwi Barracks, Bulford Camp as part of the 6th Airborne Division. His friend Dick Morgan, who had transferred from the South Lancashire Regiment to the Ulster Rifles, also joined him there. 6th Airborne was then deployed to Palestine in its entirety.

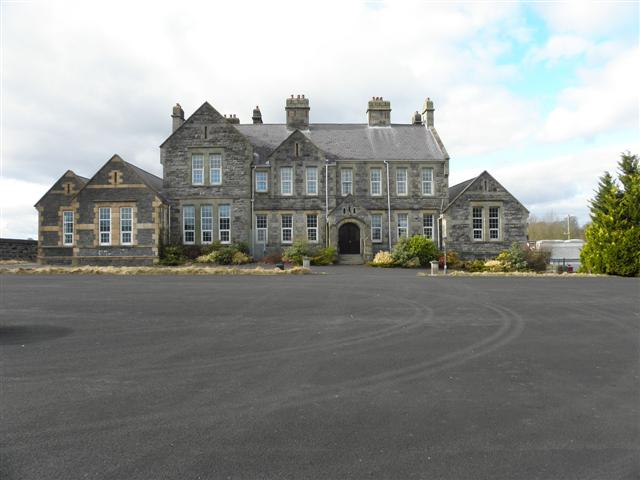
Officers Mess building at St Lucia Barracks, Omagh

In 1946, Purdon was appointed as commander, with the rank of major, of the Royal Ulster Rifles Company at the 25th Infantry Training Centre at St Lucia Barracks, Omagh, in Northern Ireland. During this time he also commanded the Royal Ulster Rifles component of the Victory Parade in London.

Purdon was posted to Egypt in late 1949 on a staff posting for two years before spending a year in Hong Kong with his own battalion, the 1st Royal Ulster Rifles who were then part of the 27th Infantry Brigade and stationed near the border with battalion headquarters at Fanling golf course. Following which he was posted to the London Irish Rifles at the Duke of York's Headquarters in Chelsea in early 1952.

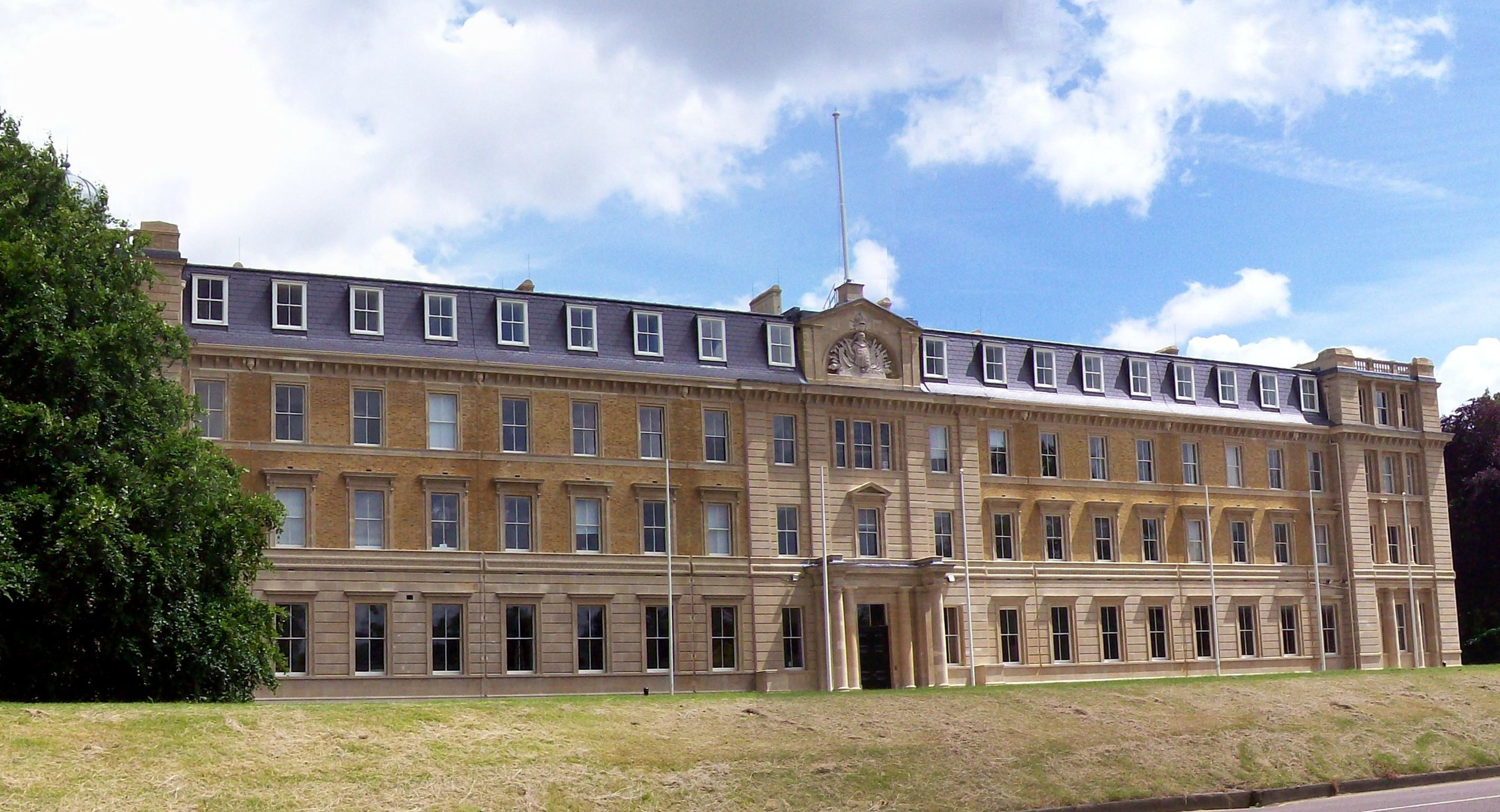
Staff College, Camberley

In 1954, he attended Staff College, Camberley and following his tuition there was posted to GHQ Far East Land Forces based in Singapore. Maintaining a hands on approach, Purdon attached himself to several units who were on active duty in the Malayan jungle as part of the counter insurgency approach to the Malayan Emergency. Following the end of his appointment in 1956, finding he had four months to spare before his next appointment, he applied to his commanding officer Lieutenant Colonel Roger Wheeler for an appointment with the Ulster Rifles and was given command of Support Company of the 1st Battalion in Cyprus who were then on deployment during the Cyprus Emergency. During this period he again involved himself heavily in operations.

Between 1958 and 1960, Purdon was in command of the Regimental Depot of the Royal Ulster Rifles at St Patrick's Barracks, Ballymena. A posting he relished as it allowed him once again to become involved in riding to hounds, fly fishing, other sporting activities and exploring Northern Ireland and parts of Ireland.

Following his stay in Ballymena, Purdon was posted to Iserlohn in West Germany as second in command of the 1st Battalion, Royal Ulster Rifles with his commanding officer being Lt Col Sam Sturgeon. The battalion at that point was part of the 5th Infantry Brigade and shared barracks with brigade headquarters at Aldershot Barracks, a former Luftwaffe Flakartillerie installation.

== Command ==
In April 1962, he became commanding officer of the 1st Battalion, Royal Ulster Rifles. The first task he set himself was to "rid the battalion" of around 30 men whom he considered to be a disruptive influence because of their aggressive behaviour and heavy drinking. He did this through military law and with the backing of the brigade commander. During this time the battalion became the first in the British Army to be equipped with the FV432 tracked, armoured personnel carrier; trialing and training in familiarisation of that vehicle was extensive. In May 1963, the battalion was posted to Carter Camp (which was then in wooden huts) in Bulford, Wiltshire as part of the 51st Gurkha Brigade and converted from a mechanised unit to airportable. Following extensive exercises in Australia, 1 RUR was deployed to Borneo during the Indonesia–Malaysia confrontation.

On relinquishing command in 1964, still as a Lieutenant Colonel, he became the Chief Instructor of the All Arms (Tactics) Battlegroup Course at the School of Infantry in Warminster, Wiltshire, preparing senior Captains and Majors to command infantry/armour Combat Teams. His tenure in this post was shortened when he received accelerated promotion to the rank of brigadier and appointed Commander, Sultan of Oman's Armed Forces and Director of Operations during the Dhofar Rebellion between 1967 and 1970. As a result of his command of the Sultan's forces, he was appointed as a Commander of the Order of the British Empire (CBE) by Elizabeth II.

During his time in Oman his regiment, the Royal Ulster Rifles ceased to exist as it, along with the other two infantry regiments of the North Irish Brigade amalgamated in July 1968 to form the Royal Irish Rangers.

Purdon became Commandant, School of Infantry in 1970 and following promotion to major general General Officer Commanding North West District in 1972. His last appointment was as General Officer Commanding, Near East Land Forces in 1974 before retiring from the army in 1976.

=== Police career ===
After retiring from the British Army, Purdon was recommended to be the Chief Constable of the Royal Ulster Constabulary. The government opted however to appoint Sir Kenneth Newman. In 1978, he was appointed Deputy Commissioner of the Royal Hong Kong Police, and held this post until his retirement in 1981 at the age of 60 when he was honoured again with the award of the Colonial Police Medal.

== Honorary posts ==
Purdon was appointed Honorary Colonel of the London Irish Rifles after his retirement from official duties and later became President of their Regimental Association.

Honorary appointments also included:

- Honorary Colonel of Queen's University Belfast Officer Training Corps, relinquished in 1978.
- Honorary Colonel D (London Irish Rifles) Company, 4th (Volunteer) Battalion The Royal Irish Rangers, relinquished in 1993.
- Knight of the most Venerable Order of the Hospital of St John of Jerusalem, 1984.

After retiring he was also involved in the Royal Humane Society and was Commander of the Wiltshire Branch of St John Ambulance. He was President of the Royal Ulster Rifles Association and was a regular at the Regimental Remembrance Pilgrimage to Normandy where, until June 2013, he led the annual tribute to honour the actions and exploits of the 1st and 2nd Battalions of The Royal Ulster Rifles during the Normandy Landings.

== Family ==
In 1945, Purdon married Maureen Patricia Purdon (née Petrie); they had two sons, Tim and Patrick (deceased) and a daughter Angela. One son followed in his father's footsteps and became a soldier, Colonel Tim Purdon, who also served with the Sultan of Oman's armed forces for two periods, and was also appointed as a Lieutenant of the Honourable Corps of Gentlemen at Arms. After the death of his first wife, Purdon at age 88 married the 74-year-old Jean Otway (née Walker). Jean was previously married to Terence Otway, Purdon's cousin.

== Death ==
Purdon died peacefully in his sleep of natural causes at his home in Devizes in the early hours on 27 June 2018 at the age of 97 with his family at his side. His son Tim said: "He really just died of old age. He was very happy on that day for everyone to be together."

The historian James Dorrian said of him: "He was extremely charming, charismatic and incredibly inspirational. He was the sort of person who you would follow into hell." He was also incredibly fit and was still doing 50 press ups a day well into his 80s. "He didn't care about money, his whole life was dedicated to service." "He was one of the most impressive men I have ever known and a true gentleman. "He will truly be missed and the world is a poorer place without him."

== Media and events ==
He published his autobiography in 1993, List the Bugle: Reminiscences of an Irish soldier.

Purdon appeared in some history-related documentaries. In March 2009, then aged 87, along with Micky Burn (1912–2010) and Dr Bill 'Tiger' Watson' (1921–2018) went to Saint-Nazaire to commemorate the raid while filming a feature-film documentary adapted from Burn's 2003 autobiography Turned Towards the Sun.

In 2007, he appeared in the BBC's documentary The Greatest Raid of All Time presented by Jeremy Clarkson.

In March 2012, then aged 90, he was made guest of honour in St Nazaire at the 70th anniversary celebratory event of the St Nazaire Raid. In June 2014, aged 93, he attended the 70th anniversary celebratory event of the D-Day Landings.

== Sources ==
- Purdon, Conran (1993). List the Bugle: Reminiscences of an Irish Soldier. Greystone Books. ISBN 978-1870157193.
- Wilson, Dare (2008). With the 6th Airborne Division in Palestine 1945–1948. Barnsley: Pen and Sword Books. ISBN 978-1-84415-771-6.

Military offices
| Preceded by James Wilson | GOC North West District; 1972−1974 | Succeeded by Keith McQueen |
