= Bulford railway station =

Served the village of Bulford in Wiltshire, England, between 1906 and 1963

Bulford
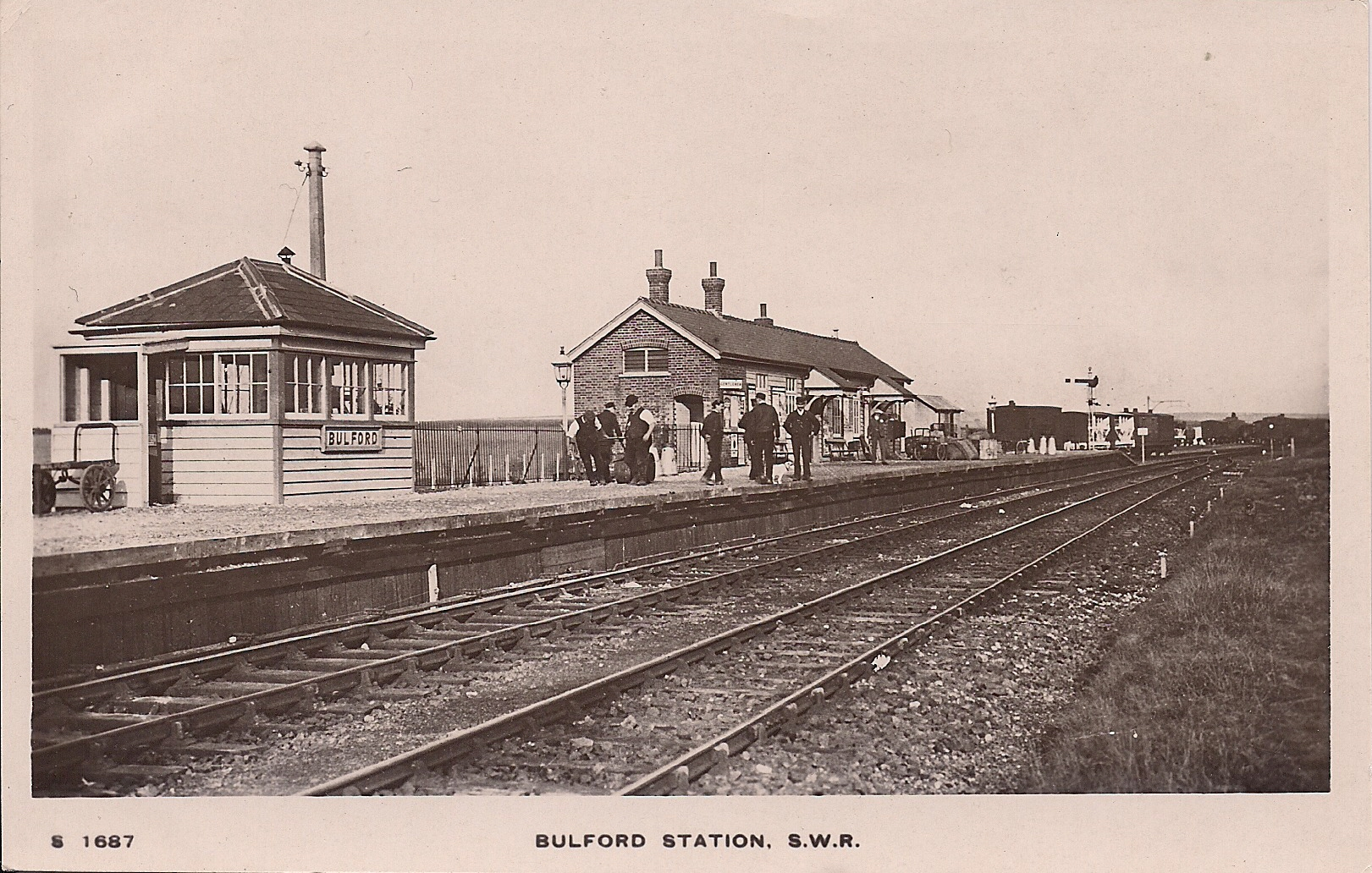
- Bulford station soon after opening

General information
- Location: Bulford; England
- Coordinates: 51.1895°N 1.7575°W
- Platforms: 1

Other information
- Status: Disused

History
- Original company: Amesbury and Military Camp Light Railway

Key dates
- 1 June 1906: station opened
- 30 June 1952: closed to passengers
- 4 March 1963: closed to goods
Location

Bulford railway station served the village of Bulford in Wiltshire, England, between 1906 and 1963.

== Extension ==
The line between Grateley and Amesbury had already opened in 1902, being operated by the London and South Western Railway. In May of that year, the War Department requested that the line be extended from its present terminus to the recently opened Bulford Camp. A new light railway order, for the Amesbury & Military Camp Light Railway (Bulford Extension) was confirmed on 10 January 1903. The War Department had an agreement with the railway company to provide financial assistance for the building of the extension. The extension was built by the LSWR's own staff. Work on the extension began in 1904.

== Design ==
Bulford was the terminus of the public passenger service; trains which continued beyond it were exclusively for military purposes. It had a single concrete-faced platform on the down side of the line, with a run-around loop and a substantial station building built from brick and timber. At some point in later years, the building was fitted with a large wooden awning which covered the platform in front of it. The station had a small signal box, though this was reduced to a ground frame in 1935. There were sidings and a large goods yard.

== Closure ==
After some years in decline, passenger service on the line was withdrawn in 1952. The stations at Amesbury and Bulford remained open for goods services and military trains until 1963. The station, together with three homes, was demolished soon after closure. The site has been occupied by offices of the Property Services Agency since 1969.

Preceding station	Disused railways	Following station
Amesbury; Line and station closed	London and South Western Railway; Bulford Camp Railway	Bulford Camp; Line and station closed

== Sources ==
- Harding, Peter A (1991). The Bulford Branch Line. Binfield Books. ISBN 9780950941479.
