= General Dunbar =

General Dunbar may refer to:

- Charles Dunbar (British Army officer) (1919–1981), British Army major general
- Claude Dunbar (1909–1971), British Army major general
- Donald P. Dunbar (fl. 1980s–2010s), Wisconsin Air National Guard major general
- Sharon K.G. Dunbar (fl. 1980s–2010s), U.S. Air Force major general
