= James Wilson (British Army officer) =

Lieutenant-General Sir James Wilson KBE MC
- Born: 13 April 1921
- Died: 17 December 2004 (aged 83)
- Military career
- Allegiance: United Kingdom
- Branch: British Army
- Service years: 1941–1977
- Rank: Lieutenant-General
- Service number: 180730
- Commands: 1st Bn, Lancashire Fusiliers; 147th Infantry Brigade; North West District; South East District
- Conflicts: World War II; Mau Mau Uprising
- Awards: Knight Commander of the Order of the British Empire; Military Cross

Lieutenant-General Sir Alexander James Wilson KBE MC (13 April 1921 – 17 December 2004) was a British Army officer who commanded South East District.

== Military career ==
Born the son of Major-General Bevil Wilson and educated at Winchester College and New College, Oxford, Wilson originally enlisted with the King's Shropshire Light Infantry and was then commissioned into the Rifle Brigade in December 1940. He served in World War II in North Africa and in Italy earning the MC for taking the village of Lusia.

After the war he served as private secretary to the Commander-in-Chief of the newly independent Pakistan Army. He served in Kenya during the Mau Mau Uprising in 1954 and became Commanding Officer of 1st Battalion the Lancashire Fusiliers in 1962. He was appointed chief of staff for the United Nations force in Cyprus in 1964, Commander of 147th Infantry Brigade in 1966 and Director of Army Recruiting at the Ministry of Defence in 1967. He went on to be General Officer Commanding North West District in 1970, Vice Adjutant-General in 1972 and General Officer Commanding South East District in 1974 before retiring in 1977.

In retirement he was given the colonelcy of the Royal Regiment of Fusiliers from 1977 to 1982. He was also chairman and then chief executive of the Tobacco Advisory Council and a Football Correspondent for The Sunday Times.

== Family ==
In 1958 he married the Hon. Jean Margaret Rankeillour, daughter of Arthur Hope, 2nd Baron Rankeillour; they had two sons, one step-son and two step-daughters.

== Works ==
- 'Unusual Undertakings: A Military Memoir' by James Wilson

Military offices
Preceded by Charles Dunbar	GOC North West District; 1970−1972	Succeeded by Corran Purdon
Preceded by Sir Terence McMeekin	GOC South East District; 1974–1977	Succeeded by Sir Anthony Farrar-Hockley
Honorary titles
Preceded by George Harris Lea	Colonel of the Royal Regiment of Fusiliers; 1977–1982	Succeeded by David Milner Woodford
