= Tony Crowfoot =

British Army general

Major-General Tony Crowfoot CB CBE
- Born: Anthony Bernard Crowfoot; 12 August 1936; Erpingham, Norfolk
- Died: 13 September 2008 (aged 72)
- Military career
- Allegiance: United Kingdom
- Branch: British Army
- Rank: Major-General
- Commands: 39th Infantry Brigade; North West District
- Conflicts: Northern Ireland
- Awards: Companion of the Order of the Bath; Commander of the Order of the British Empire

Major-General Anthony Bernard Crowfoot CB CBE (12 August 1936 – 13 September 2008) was an officer of the British Army.

== Early life ==
Born in Norfolk, he was educated at King Edward VII Grammar School, King's Lynn. When Crowfoot was six, his father was killed near Cologne while piloting an Avro Lancaster during the Second World War.

== Military career ==
Crowfoot was commissioned into the East Yorkshire Regiment in 1956. He became Commander 39th Infantry Brigade in Northern Ireland in 1980, Deputy Commander, Land Forces, Hong Kong in 1983 and Director-General, Army Manning and Recruiting in 1986. His last appointment was as General Officer Commanding North West District in 1989 before retiring in 1991.

He was appointed a Companion of the Order of the Bath in the 1991 Birthday Honours.

He was married to Bridget; they had three sons and one daughter. He died of cancer on 13 September 2008.

Military offices
Preceded by Colin Shortis	General Officer Commanding North West District; 1989–1991	Succeeded by Post abolished
