= Peter Sibbald =

British Army officer (1928–1994)

Major-General Peter Sibbald CB OBE
- Born: 24 March 1928
- Died: 5 July 1994 (aged 66)
- Military career
- Allegiance: United Kingdom
- Branch: British Army
- Rank: Major-General
- Commands: 51st Gurkha Infantry Brigade; North West District
- Conflicts: Malayan Emergency; Korean War
- Awards: Companion of the Order of the Bath; Officer of the Order of the British Empire

Major-General Peter Frank Aubrey Sibbald CB OBE (24 March 1928 – 5 July 1994) was a British Army officer.

== Military career ==
Educated at Haileybury, Sibbald was commissioned into the King's Own Yorkshire Light Infantry in 1948 and saw action during the Malayan Emergency and the Korean War. He became commanding officer of a battalion of The Light Infantry in 1968. He became Commander of 51st Gurkha Infantry Brigade in Hong Kong in 1972, Divisional Brigadier, Light Division in 1975 and General Officer Commanding North West District in 1977. His last appointment was as Director of Infantry in 1980 before retiring in 1983.

He was appointed a Companion of the Order of the Bath in the 1982 New Year Honours.

In 1958 he married Margaret Maureen Entwistle; they had one son and one daughter.

Military offices
Preceded by Keith McQueen	General Officer Commanding North West District; 1977–1980	Succeeded by Michael Hicks
