= North West District (British Army) =

- Active: 1967–1991
- Country: United Kingdom
- Branch: British Army
- Type: District Command
- Garrison/HQ: Cuerden Hall (until 1977); Fulwood Barracks (after 1977)

North West District was a district command of the British Army from 1967 and 1991.

== History ==
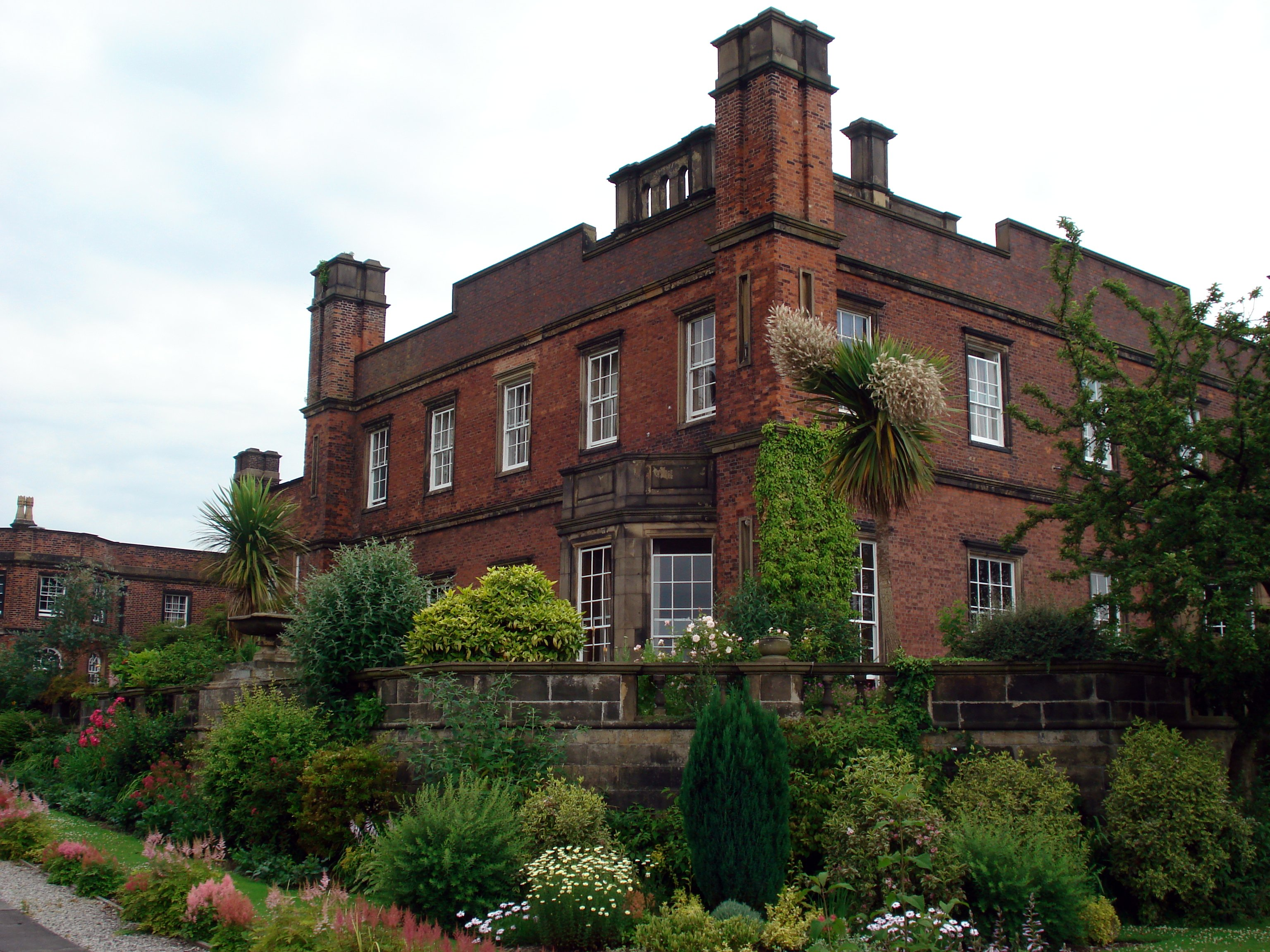
Cuerden Hall, command headquarters, 1967–1977

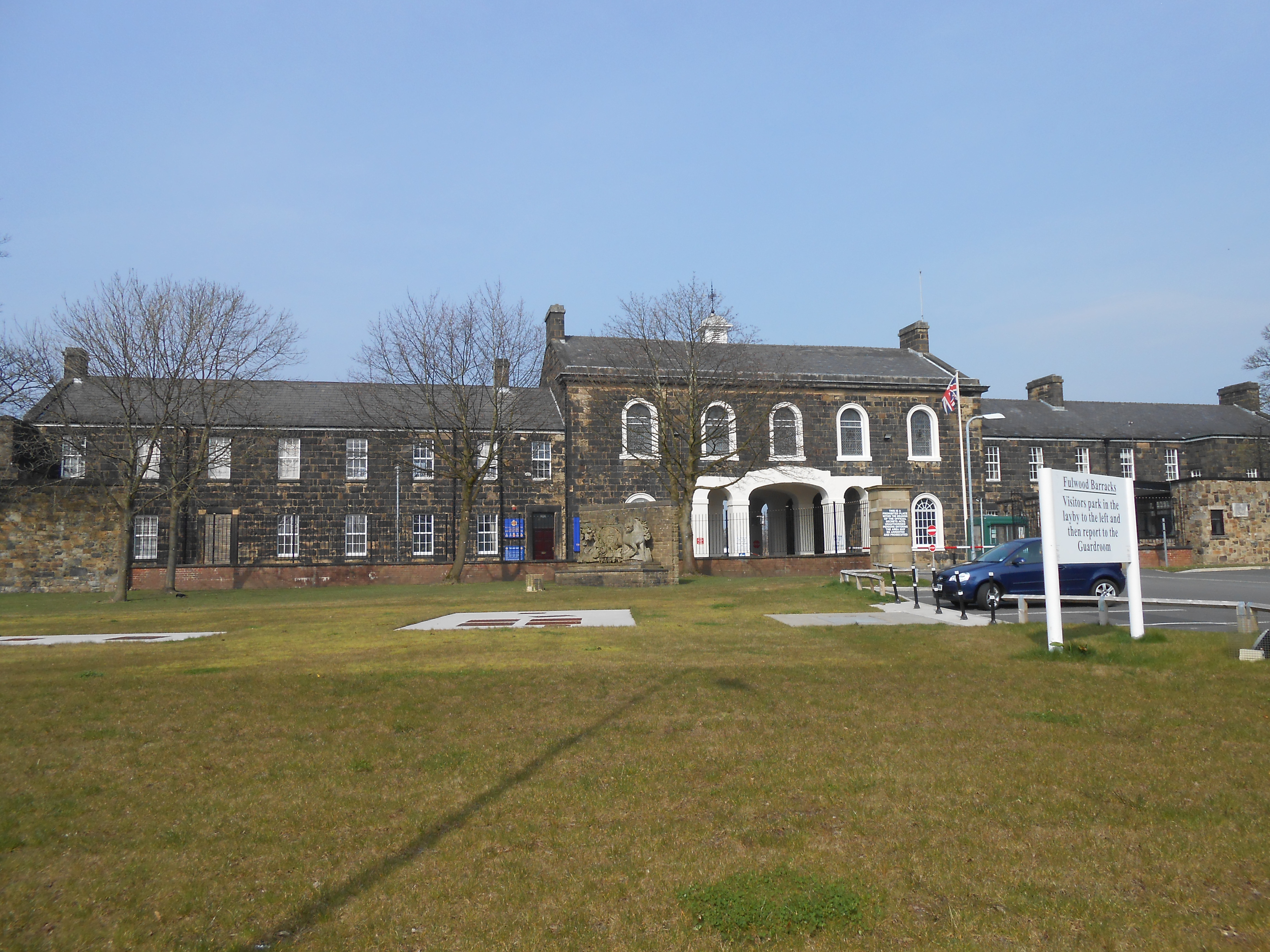
Fulwood Barracks, command headquarters, 1977–1991

The district was formed from 42nd (East Lancashire) Infantry Division as part of the Territorial Army Volunteer Reserve in 1967. It had its headquarters at Cuerden Hall, and was placed under the command of HQ UK Land Forces in 1972. In 1991, the first of the minor districts to be amalgamated were North West District, the former West Midlands District (by then Western District) and Wales, to form a new Wales and Western District.

== Commanders ==
General officers commanding included:

- 1967–1968 Major-General Bala Bredin
- 1968–1970 Major-General Charles Dunbar
- 1970–1972 Major-General James Wilson
- 1972–1974 Major-General Corran Purdon
- 1974–1977 Major-General Keith McQueen
- 1977–1980 Major-General Peter Sibbald
- 1980–1983 Major-General Michael Hicks
- 1983–1986 Major-General Philip Davies
- 1986–1989 Major-General Colin Shortis
- 1989–1991 Major-General Tony Crowfoot
