= Amesbury railway station =

Disused railway station in Amesbury, Wiltshire

Amesbury
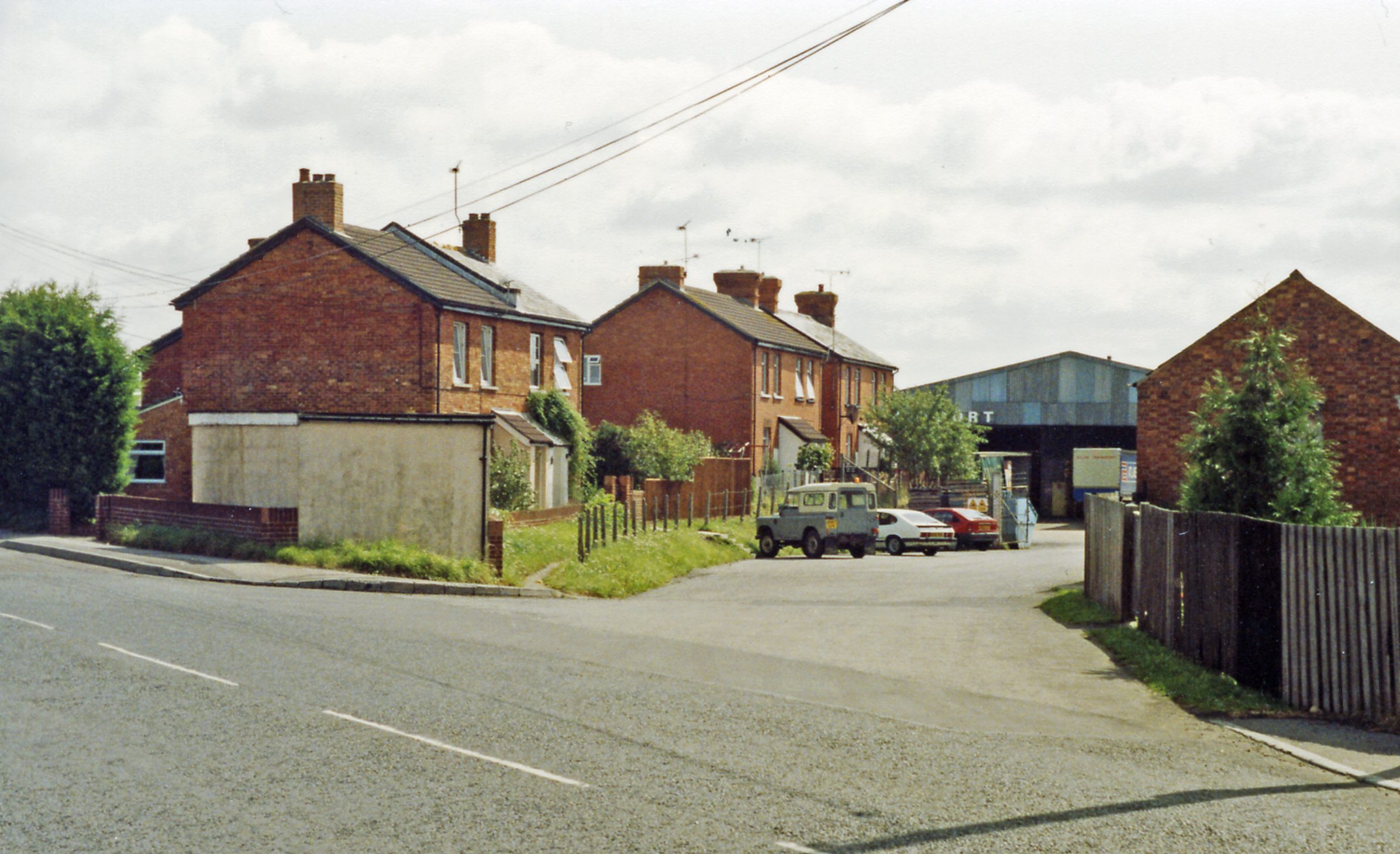
- Location of the former station (1992)

General information
- Location: Amesbury, Wiltshire; England
- Coordinates: 51.17542°N 1.76610°W
- Platforms: 2

Other information
- Status: Disused

History
- Original company: Amesbury and Military Camp Light Railway
- Pre-grouping: London and South Western Railway
- Post-grouping: Southern Railway

Key dates
- 2 June 1902: Station opened
- 30 June 1952: Station closed for passenger services
- 1963: Station closed completely
Location

Amesbury railway station was a station in the county of Wiltshire in southern England. It was located on the Bulford Camp branch line, which diverged from what is now known as the West of England Main Line at a triangular junction between Grateley and Idmiston Halt. When it was open, Amesbury was the nearest station to Stonehenge and carried a lot of traffic to the military areas in and around Salisbury Plain, particularly during the Second World War in the preparations for D-Day.

== History ==
Opened on 2 June 1902 by the Amesbury and Military Camp Light Railway, and becoming part of the London and South Western Railway, the station was absorbed by the Southern Railway during the Grouping of 1923. It then passed on to the Southern Region of British Railways on nationalisation in 1948. Passenger services were withdrawn in 1952 but goods trains and occasional military special trains used the station until 1963. After closure the station was demolished and the site covered with housing.

| Preceding station | Disused railways | Following station |
|---|---|---|
| Newton Tony; Line and station closed | London and South Western Railway; Bulford Camp Railway | Bulford; Line and station closed |
