= Garrison Church of St Alban the Martyr, Larkhill =

Garrison Church, Larkhill
- Garrison Church of St Alban the Martyr
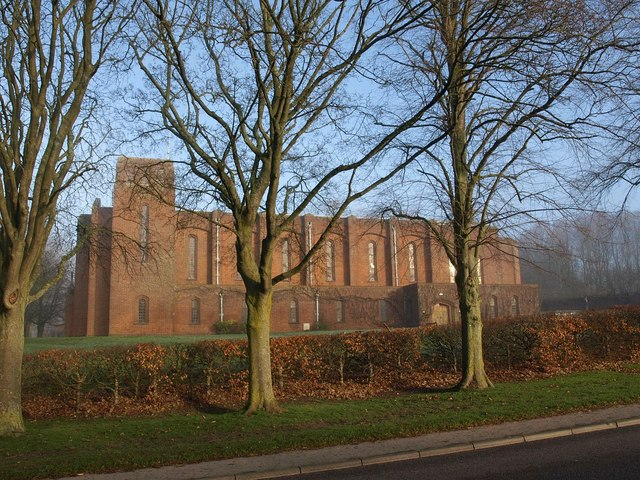

- 51.1971°N 1.8067°W
- OS grid reference: SU 13609 44234
- Location: Lawrence Road, Larkhill, Wiltshire
- Country: England
- Denomination: Church of England

Architecture
- Functional status: Active
- Heritage designation: Grade II listed
- Designated: 2015
- Architect: William A Ross
- Style: Swedish-influenced design

Specifications
- Materials: Red brick

Administration
- Diocese: Jurisdiction: Bishop to the Forces; Location: Diocese of Salisbury

Listed Building – Grade II
- Official name: Church of St Alban the Martyr
- Designated: 9 October 2015
- Reference no.: 1428757

The Garrison Church of St Alban the Martyr is a Church of England church in Larkhill, Wiltshire, England.

== History ==
The garrison church, dedicated to St Alban the Martyr and St Barbara, was built in 1937 and replaced an earlier wooden church. The architect, as for the officers' mess, was William Ross; construction is in red brick, with a short southwest tower.

In 2011 the church became the regimental church of the Royal Artillery. The regimental chapel at the Woolwich Barracks closed around the same time, and two stained glass windows were moved to the Larkhill church where they are displayed in lightboxes. One of these is by Christopher Whall, an Arts & Crafts artist.

In 2015, as part of the 300th anniversary celebrations of the Royal Artillery, an additional memorial was created outside the existing structure. Designed to look like the surviving perimeter wall and chapel of St George's Garrison Church, Woolwich, the former Royal Artillery Garrison Chapel, it is painted in the Regimental colours of red and blue. The memorial houses some of the memorial plaques from the Woolwich chapel and a memorial to those members of the Royal Artillery who have been awarded the Victoria Cross. Planned to be completed in time for the 300th anniversary in May 2016, construction was delayed due to concerns over the impact of work close to the Stonehenge World Heritage Site. Instead, Her Majesty the Queen, the Royal Artillery Captain General, laid the cornerstone during her visit to Larkhill in May 2016 and the building was completed in time for the dedication ceremony at the annual St Barbara's Day Service (the Royal Artillery's Patron Saint) on 4 December 2016.
