= Colin Shortis =

British Army general

Major-General Colin Shortis CB CBE
- Born: 18 January 1934
- Died: 8 January 2017 (aged 82); Spain
- Military career
- Allegiance: United Kingdom
- Branch: British Army
- Service years: 1951-1989
- Rank: Major-General
- Units: Royal Fusiliers; Dorset Regiment
- Commands: 1st Battalion Devonshire and Dorset Regiment; 8th Infantry Brigade; North West District
- Awards: Companion of the Order of the Bath; Commander of the Order of the British Empire

Major-General Colin Terry Shortis CB CBE (18 January 1934 – 8 January 2017) was a senior British Army officer.

== Biography ==
Born on 18 January 1934, Colin Shortis was educated at Bedford School. He enlisted in the British Army in 1951 and received his first commission in the Royal Fusiliers in 1953. He transferred to the Dorset Regiment in 1953, and served in Hong Kong, the Suez Canal Zone, with the British Army of the Rhine, in Aden, Singapore and British Guiana, between 1953 and 1963. He became commanding officer of the 1st Battalion Devonshire and Dorset Regiment in 1974. He went on to be Commander of the 8th Infantry Brigade in 1978, Commander of the British Military Advisory and Training Team in Zimbabwe in 1982 and Director of Infantry in 1983. His last appointment was as General Officer Commanding, North West District in 1986 before retiring 1989.

Shortis was appointed a Commander of the Order of the British Empire in 1980 and a Companion of the Order of the Bath in 1988.

He was given the colonelcy of the Devonshire and Dorset Regiment in 1984, holding the position until 1990.

He died on 8 January 2017 at the age of 82.

Military offices
Preceded by Philip Davies	General Officer Commanding North West District; 1986–1989	Succeeded by Tony Crowfoot
