= Royal School of Artillery =

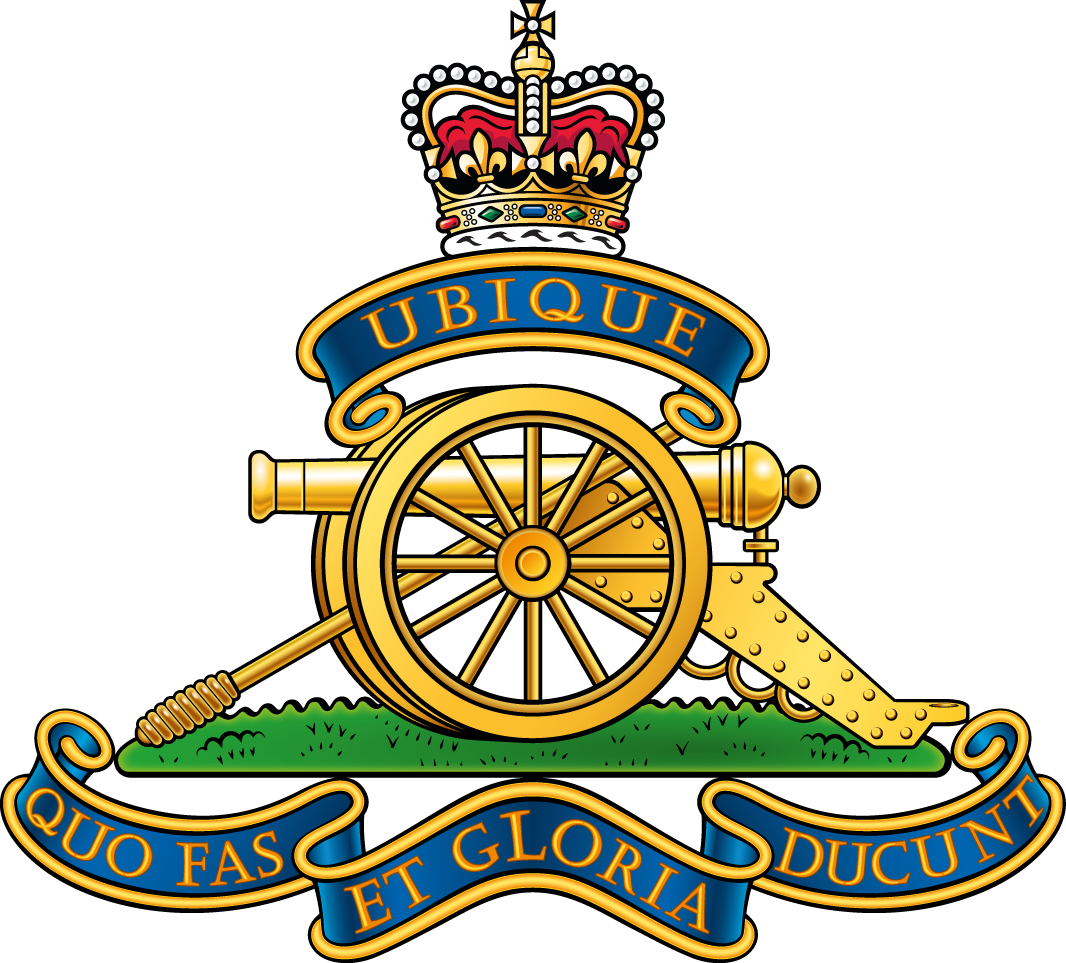
- Cap badge of the Royal Artillery
- Active: 1915 – present
- Country: United Kingdom
- Branch: British Army
- Type: Training
- Role: Artillery Training
- Part of: Army Recruiting and Training Division
- Garrison/HQ: Larkhill

Commanders
- Notable commanders: Alan Brooke, 1st Viscount Alanbrooke; Sir Henry Pownall

The Royal School of Artillery (RSA) is the principal training establishment for artillery warfare in the British Army. Established in 1915, it is based at Larkhill, Wiltshire, on the south edge of the Salisbury Plain Training Area. The school is the primary training facility for Royal Artillery recruits, and is also home to the Gunnery Training Team.

== History ==
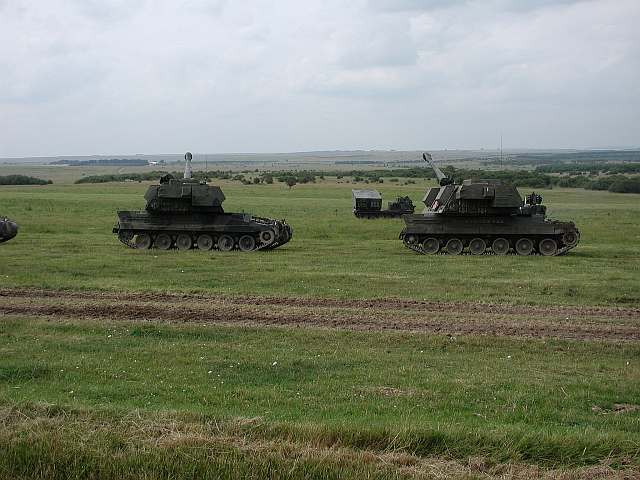
Self propelled guns at Larkhill

The Royal School of Artillery was established in 1915 as the School of Instruction for Royal Horse and Field Artillery (Larkhill), on land previously used for tented accommodation at Larkhill. The 1,200-bed Fargo hospital, which was built to the west of the School, opened around the same time to tend for wounded soldiers returning from the First World War; it closed after the war and is now the main ammunition compound for the school. The first commandant of the school was Brigadier-General Henry Newcome, after whom Newcome Hall at Larkhill is named. In 1920 it expanded to become the School of Artillery, Larkhill.

During the Second World War, the school was a hive of activity and provided a significant part of the training for over one million gunners.

In 1970, the title Royal School of Artillery was conferred on the school when the Anti-aircraft School at Manorbier was amalgamated with it. At that time the school was made up of seven 'wings': Gunnery, Air Defence, Tactics, Locating, Signals, Administrative, and REME.

In 2007 the Headquarters, Royal Artillery moved from Woolwich to Larkhill, where it is co-located with the RSA.

=== Antecedents ===
From 1778, specialist training for Artillery officers was undertaken at the Royal Military Repository in Woolwich. The Repository was based in the Royal Arsenal until 1802, when it relocated to an area of land alongside the nearby Royal Artillery Barracks. In the early 19th century, gun drill took place on the Gun Parks, manoeuvres in the Repository Grounds and target practice (using mortars and howitzers) on Woolwich Common.

Use of the common as a firing range ceased when the Regiment's first School of Artillery (then called the School of Gunnery) was established at Shoeburyness, Essex, in 1859. To ensure parity of training for the Reserve Forces, the School of Gunnery established a branch at Woolwich, which in 1874 took over responsibility for training militia and volunteer artillery; its instructors were based at the Repository, but live firing now took place on Plumstead Marshes. The Royal Military Repository closed in 1890, whereupon its staff and activities moved to Lydd, Kent, where they formed the Siege Artillery branch of the School of Gunnery; Shoeburyness continued to provide training in Field, Horse, Mountain and Garrison Artillery.

In 1915, the Field Artillery and Horse Artillery elements from Shoeburyness were transferred to Larkhill, where over 22,000 acres (8,900 ha) of Salisbury Plain had been acquired in 1897 for use as firing ranges. Chapperton Down Artillery School was established in 1916, to the west of Larkhill, to train French battery commanders; the following year it expanded to run courses for the Home Defence Artillery. Also in 1916, a training centre for heavy artillery was established at Woolwich; the following year it moved to Winchester.

In December 1919, the Army Council decided to combine the School of Instruction for Royal Horse and Field Artillery with the Chapperton Down Artillery School and the Heavy Artillery Training Centre to form an expanded School of Artillery. This took place in 1920; the following year the Siege Artillery School moved to Larkhill from Lydd and was likewise merged into the School. Shoeburyness, though, retained the Coast Artillery School of the Royal Garrison Artillery; in 1940 it moved to Great Orme near Llandudno, North Wales, where it stayed for the duration of the war, before moving again to the Royal Citadel, Plymouth (where it remained until 1956, when the UK's coastal artillery network was disbanded).

== Operations ==
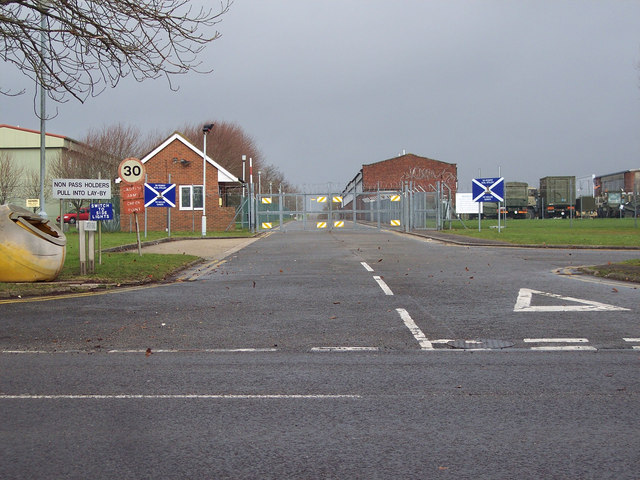
Horne Barracks, Larkhill

The school provides Phase 2 training for recruits to the Royal Artillery: this training includes gunnery, air defence, surveillance and signals. Trained officers and gunners are then posted to units worldwide, but return to the school for frequent refresher courses. The school is also the home of the Gunnery Training Team, which provides a training consultancy service to the Royal Artillery and the wider Army.

== Facilities ==
Facilities which have grown up around the school include the Royal Artillery Barracks which accommodates 14 Regiment Royal Artillery; Roberts Barracks, named after Field Marshal Lord Roberts, which accommodates 32 Regiment Royal Artillery; as well as Horne Barracks, named after General Lord Horne, which accommodates 47 Regiment Royal Artillery.

The Officers' Mess and Quarters, designed by William A Ross, Chief Architect to the War Office, and built between 1936 and 1941 is a Grade II listed building.

== Commandants ==
Commandants of the RSA have included:

- Brigadier-General Henry W. Newcome: April 1920–November 1922
- Brigadier-General William Stirling: November 1922–November 1926
- Brigadier C. Clement Armitage: November 1926–February 1929
- Brigadier Alan F. Brooke: February 1929–March 1932
- Brigadier James M.R. Harrison: March 1932–October 1934
- Brigadier Lord Douglas Malise Graham: October 1934–September 1936
- Brigadier Henry R. Pownall: September 1936–March 1938
- Brigadier Sydney R. Wason: March 1938–September 1939
- Brigadier Francis Fitzgibbon: September 1939–November 1942
- Brigadier Rowland H. Towell: November 1942–October 1945
- Brigadier Gerard W.E. Heath: October 1945–December 1947
- Brigadier Gerald G. Mears: December 1947–December 1949
- Brigadier Richard W. Goodbody: December 1949–September 1951
- Brigadier Cyril H. Colquhoun: September 1951–October 1953
- Brigadier Edward D. Howard-Vyse: October 1953–February 1956
- Brigadier Adam J.C. Block: February 1956–January 1959
- Brigadier John M. McNeill: January 1959–June 1960
- Brigadier Peter J. Glover: June 1960–September 1962
- Brigadier William D.E. Brown: September 1962–January 1964
- Brigadier John A.T. Sharp: January 1964–February 1966
- Brigadier R.S. Streatfield: February 1966–January 1969
- Brigadier Geoffrey de Egglesfield Collin: January 1969–July 1971
- Brigadier Peter B. Foster: July 1971–April 1973
- Brigadier Keith J. McQueen: April 1973–September 1974
- Brigadier John S. Badley: September 1974–July 1976
- Brigadier Richard N. Ohlenschlager: July 1976–December 1977
- Brigadier J. David W. Goodman: December 1977–December 1979
- Brigadier Derek M. Jones: December 1979–December 1982
- Brigadier John B. Bettridge: December 1982–January 1985
- Brigadier William E. Winder: January 1985–October 1987
- Brigadier Alastair J. McD. Clark: October 1987–August 1990
- Brigadier Giles G. Arnold: August 1990–October 1992
- Brigadier M. Shane Rutter-Jerome: October 1992 – 1995

=== Commandants of the School of Gunnery ===
A list of Commandants of the School of Gunnery from 1859 to 1899:

Commandant	Appointed
J. W. Michell	1 April 1859
Arthur J. Taylor	14 May 1860
F. M. Eardley-Wilmot	13 July 1864
Thomas Elwyn	1 Oct 1868
Edward H. Fisher	1 Aug 1872
F. W. Hastings	1 Oct 1877
W. A. Fox-Strangways	1 Oct 1880
C. E. Nairne	1 Apr 1885
S. J. Nicholson	3 Mar 1887
J. B. Richardson	3 Mar 1890
R. McG. Stewart	1 Mar 1894
J. F. Betty	1 Oct 1897

== Sources ==
- James, N D G (1983). Gunners at Larkhill – a history of the Royal School of Artillery. Salisbury: Griesham. ISBN 0-946095-08-6.
