= Michael Hicks (British Army officer) =

British Army officer

Major-General Michael Hicks CB OBE
- Born: 2 June 1928; Wendover, Buckinghamshire
- Died: 27 December 2008 (aged 80)
- Military career
- Allegiance: United Kingdom
- Branch: British Army
- Rank: Major-General
- Commands: 1st Battalion the Coldstream Guards; 4th Guards Armoured Brigade; North West District
- Conflicts: Northern Ireland
- Awards: Companion of the Order of the Bath; Officer of the Order of the British Empire

Major-General William Michael Ellis Hicks CB OBE (2 June 1928 – 27 December 2008) was a British Army officer.

== Military career ==
Educated at Eton College and the Royal Military Academy Sandhurst, Hicks was commissioned into the Coldstream Guards in 1948. He became commanding officer of 1st Battalion the Coldstream Guards in 1970 and was deployed to Northern Ireland during the Troubles. He was appointed an Officer of the Order of the British Empire (OBE) in the 1980 New Year Honours. He went on to be commander of the 4th Guards Armoured Brigade in Münster in 1974, Brigadier on the General Staff at UK Land Forces in 1976 and General Officer Commanding North West District in 1980 before retiring in 1983.

He was appointed a Companion of the Order of the Bath in the 1982 Birthday Honours.

In 1950 he married Jean Hilary Duncan; they had three sons. He died on 27 December 2008.

Military offices
| Preceded by Peter Sibbald | General Officer Commanding North West District; 1980–1983 | Succeeded by Philip Davies |
