= Bala Bredin =

British Army general (1916–2005)

Major-General Bala Bredin CB DSO** MC*
- Born: 28 March 1916; Peshawar, British India
- Died: 2 March 2005 (aged 88)
- Military career
- Allegiance: United Kingdom
- Branch: British Army
- Service years: 1936–1971
- Rank: Major-General
- Nickname: Bala
- Service number: 62703
- Unit: Royal Ulster Rifles
- Commands: Director of Volunteers, Territorials and Cadets; North West District; 42nd (Lancashire) Division/District; BRIXMIS; 99 Gurkha Brigade Group; 2nd Battalion, Parachute Regiment; Eastern Arab Corps; 2nd Battalion, London Irish Rifles; 6th Battalion, Royal Inniskilling Fusiliers
- Conflicts: Arab revolt in Palestine; Second World War; Palestine Emergency; Cyprus Emergency; Malayan Emergency
- Awards: Companion of the Order of the Bath; Distinguished Service Order & Two Bars; Military Cross & Bar; Mentioned in Despatches (2)

Major-General Humphrey Edgar Nicholson Bredin, CB, DSO & Two Bars, MC & Bar (28 March 1916 – 2 March 2005), known as Bala Bredin, was a British Army officer whose military service took him from 1930s Palestine via Dunkirk, North Africa and Italy to the Cold War in Germany.

== Early life ==
Bredin was born at Peshawar on the North West Frontier of British India on 28 March 1916. Bredin was the second son of Lieutenant-Colonel A. Bredin, of the Indian Army. He was educated at King's School, Canterbury, and at the Royal Military College, Sandhurst. It was at Sandhurst that Bredin acquired the nickname Bala. This was the name of a fort in Peshawar as well as a racehorse owned by the Aga Khan. After graduating from Sandhurst, Bredin was commissioned into the Royal Ulster Rifles in 1936. He deployed with the regiment to Palestine where he was quartered in a village called Bala.

== Military career ==
=== Palestine ===
During the 1936–1939 Arab revolt in Palestine Bredin was a subaltern with the 2nd Royal Ulster Rifles in Upper Galilee. The Army was charged with protecting Jewish settlements and tracking down Arab insurgents. Bredin took part in counter-insurgency with Major Orde Wingate's Special Night Squads. He was awarded the Military Cross in a clash at a notorious ambush point on the Tulkarm-Nablus road, in April 1938, and a Bar to the award a month later in a similar action. The citation recorded that, "he had already proved adept at this work which is both arduous and dangerous". He was also mentioned in dispatches for his services in Palestine.

Bredin carried out a number of atrocities during the revolt in Palestine. He killed every 15th man, three in total, in one village that failed to produce rifles. On the way to Daburiyya after the Tiberias massacre, Bredin and his men encountered a Palestinian man riding his bicycle, whom Bredin shot. At Kfar Hittim, he executed three prisoners brought to him by Jews, proclaiming:

'"In the name of the King of England, I find you guilty of murder and sentence you to death'. … He immediately ordered the English soldiers to carry out the sentence, and they shot the Arabs on the spot.' In this, Bridden [sic] was following in the practices of Wingate."

=== Second World War ===
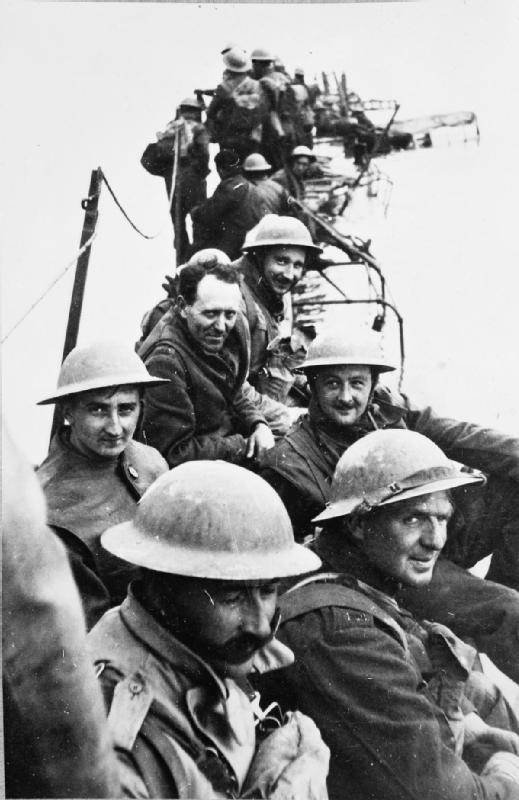
Officers of the Royal Ulster Rifles awaiting evacuation at Bray Dunes near Dunkirk, May 1940. The photograph is credited to Bredin.

Bredin participated in the Battle of France in 1940, serving with the Royal Ulster Rifles. They marched from Louvain to Dunkirk, repulsing German attacks en route, before boarding an Isle of Man steamer. While on board Bredin came across a steward and asked for a beer, to which the steward replied, "Yes, sir, but I can't serve you till we are three miles out". Bredin received his beer as they were about to land in Kent and he thought to himself, "...we can't lose the war with people like that about".

In 1944, Bredin was commanding the 6th Battalion Royal Inniskilling Fusiliers in Italy. He was tasked with breaching the Gustav Line, the German defensive position, leading the 78th Division in the engagement. A subsequent bravery citation relating to his actions of 15 May 1944 read -

Throughout this operation he commanded his battalion with the utmost skill and inspired his men by his examples of personal gallantry under heavy fire. This difficult operation was entirely successful owing to his leadership.

Two days later on 17 May 1944 he was ordered to attack Piumarola. Bredin was injured while on the start line for the attack but carried on with the engagement until loss of blood led to his fainting and he was evacuated. For his actions he was awarded the Distinguished Service Order.

After recovering from his wounds sustained in May, Bredin was placed in command of the 2nd Battalion, London Irish Rifles. The battalion were attached to the 9th Lancers and deployed in armoured personnel carriers known as Kangaroos. In this role they captured bridges over the Fossa Sabbiosola and reached the Scolo Bolognese. The action resulted in the over-running of enemy artillery position with guns destroyed and prisoners of war taken.

=== Post-war ===
After the war, Bredin served in Palestine once more before a stint as an instructor at Sandhurst. He then served as with the Sudan Defence Force between 1949 and 1953.

Bredin went on to command the 2nd Parachute Regiment at Suez and on Cyprus. It was on Cyprus that Bredin won his third DSO while carrying out counter-terrorism work. His men captured large quantities of weapons and broke up four groups. He was then posted home for two years before being sent to Malaya and Borneo where he commanded 99 Gurkha Brigade Group.

In 1962, Bredin was sent to Germany as Chief of the British Commander-in-Chief's Mission to Soviet Forces in Germany (BRIXMIS). This was a position he filled for two years. From there he was moved to command 42nd (Lancashire) Division/District of the Territorial Army in 1965. He went on to be General Officer Commanding North West District in 1967. The end of the decade saw Bredin appointed Companion of the Order of the Bath (CB) in 1969. Between 1968 and 1971 Bredin served as Director of Volunteers, Territorials and Cadets, Ministry of Defence. It was also in this period that he was the first Colonel Commandant of the King's Division. Bredin was also Colonel of the Royal Irish Rangers from 1979 to 1984.

== Retirement ==
In retirement Bredin was the Cancer Research campaign Essex and Suffolk appeals secretary. He was also a regular correspondent in The Daily Telegraph. This was the forum where he challenged defence cuts in 1991 and questioned remarks by Field Marshal Lord Carver relating to the cavalry. Bredin said that field marshals never retire; "they had to defeat the Queen's enemies in the murky future and to harass the politicians accordingly".

Bredin said of warfare that, "I've seen too much of war to like it". However, he believed that Britain should be prepared for any event and not rely on "peace in our time".

== Family ==
Bredin's first marriage, to Jacqueline Geare in 1947, was dissolved in 1961. He married Anne Hardie in 1965. He had one daughter from his first marriage and two daughters from his second.

Military offices
Preceded by Noel Thomas	GOC 42nd (Lancashire) Division/District; 1965−1967	Succeeded by Division disbanded
New title	GOC North West District; 1967−1968	Succeeded by Charles Dunbar
