= Philip Davies (British Army officer) =

Major-General Philip Davies OBE
- Born: 27 October 1932 (age 93)
- Military career
- Allegiance: United Kingdom
- Branch: British Army
- Service years: 1953-1986
- Rank: Major-General
- Commands: 1st Battalion, Royal Scots; 19th Infantry Brigade; Land Forces, Cyprus; North West District
- Conflicts: Korean War; Suez Crisis; The Troubles
- Awards: Officer of the Order of the British Empire

Major-General Philip Middleton Davies OBE (born 27 October 1932) is a former British Army officer.

== Military career ==
Educated at Charterhouse School and the Royal Military Academy Sandhurst, Davies was commissioned into the Royal Scots in 1953 and saw action during the Korean War before being deployed to the Suez Canal Zone. He became commanding officer of the 1st Battalion Royal Scots in 1973 and was deployed to Northern Ireland during the Troubles. He became commander of 19th Infantry Brigade in 1977, commander of Land Forces, Cyprus in 1981 and General Officer Commanding North West District in 1983 before retiring in 1986.

Military offices
Preceded by Michael Hicks	General Officer Commanding North West District; 1983–1986	Succeeded by Colin Shortis
