= Larkhill =

Garrison town in Wiltshire, England

Coordinates: 51.198°N 1.813°W

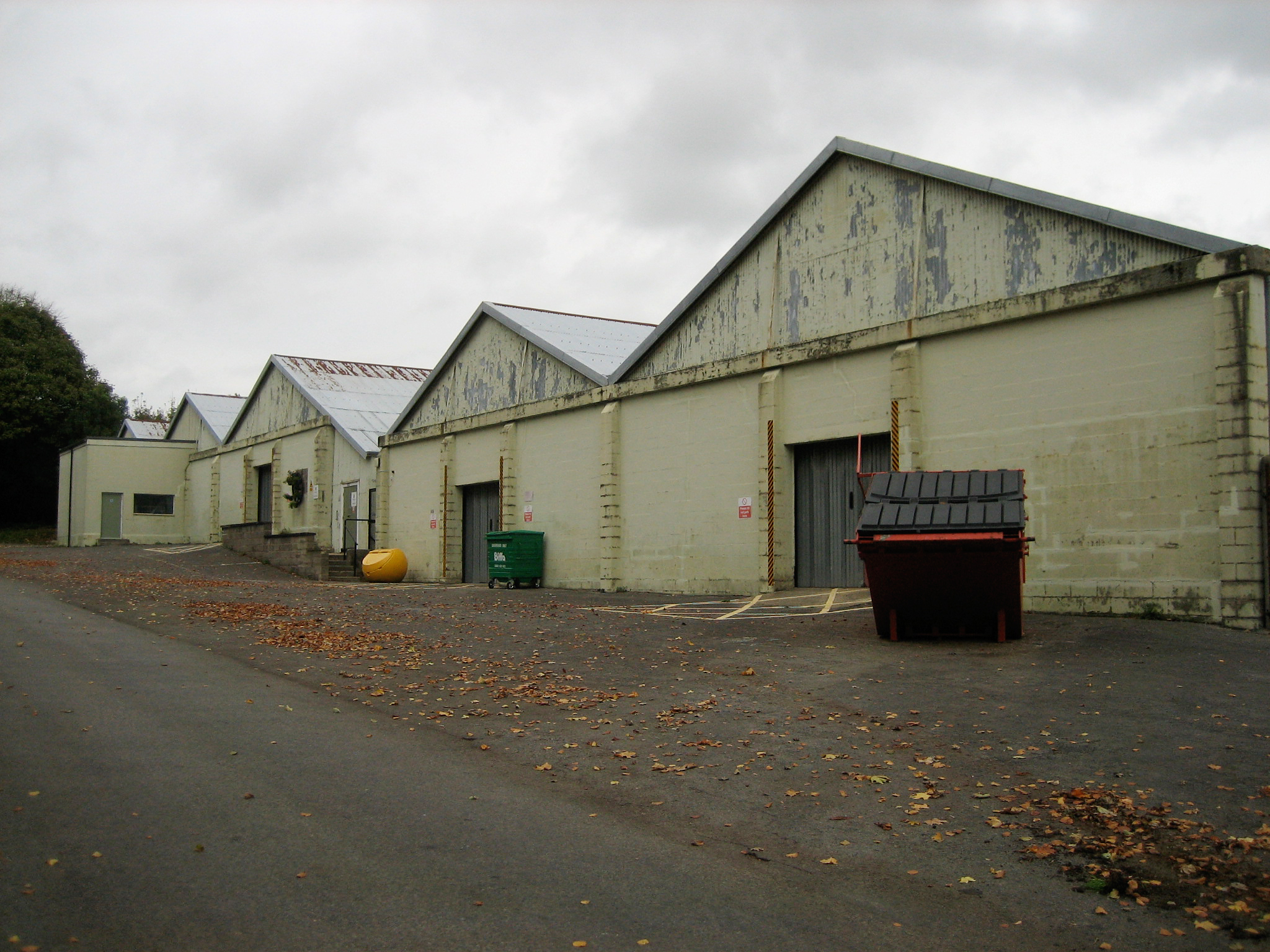
- The BCAC hangars at Larkhill, the remains of the first military aerodrome in Britain

- Location within Wiltshire
- Population: 2,733 (2021 census)
- OS grid reference: SU132443
- Civil parish: Durrington
- Unitary authority: Wiltshire
- Ceremonial county: Wiltshire
- Region: South West
- Country: England
- Sovereign state: United Kingdom
- Post town: SALISBURY
- Postcode district: SP4
- Dialling code: 01980
- Police: Wiltshire
- Fire: Dorset and Wiltshire
- Ambulance: South Western
- UK Parliament: East Wiltshire

Larkhill is a garrison town in the civil parish of Durrington, Wiltshire, England. It lies about 1 3/4 miles (2.8 km) west of the centre of Durrington village and 1 1/2 mi (2.4 km) north of the prehistoric monument of Stonehenge. It is about 10 mi (16 km) north of Salisbury.

The settlement has a long association with the British military and originally grew from military camps. It is now one of the main garrisons in the Salisbury Plain Training Area, along with Tidworth Camp, Bulford Camp, and Waterloo Lines at Warminster. The Royal School of Artillery is at Larkhill and the Royal Artillery moved its main barracks there from Woolwich in 2008.

== Etymology ==
Before the military garrison was established the area was known as Lark Hill, part of Durrington Down, owing to it being the highest point in the parish. After the first military buildings were established, it came to be known as Larkhill Camp.

== History ==
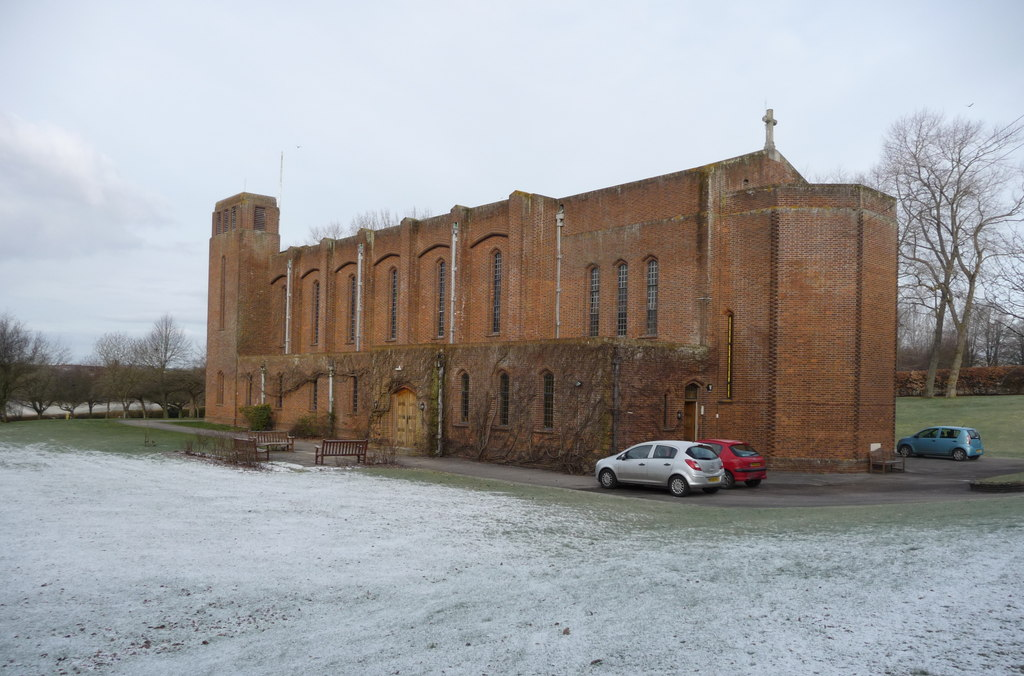
Garrison Church of St Alban the Martyr

Much of Larkhill lies within the Stonehenge World Heritage Site, an area rich in Neolithic and Bronze Age monuments. Several long barrows and round barrow groups are located within the settlement. Robin Hood's Ball, the Stonehenge Cursus and the Lesser Cursus lie close to the garrison.

The first modern settlement came in 1899, when a tented camp was established for units training on an area of Salisbury Plain that became known as Larkhill range. Units were accommodated in large official campsite areas whilst training throughout the summer. As Larkhill range was designated for artillery practice, many of the units were artillery batteries. In 1914, the first permanent huts were built on the down.

During the First World War, 34 battalion-sized hutted garrisons were built for use by all types of military forces. A light military railway line was built from the established Amesbury–Bulford line, to carry troops to Larkhill and on to Stonehenge Aerodrome and Lake Down (near Berwick St James).

After the war, the garrison became an artillery domain and in 1919 the Royal School of Artillery was established there. The light railway was lifted and the aerodromes were closed. However, several other new facilities were established in the interwar years, including a military hospital, married quarters at Strangways, a NAAFI service and military churches. The famed British Ordnance QF 25-pounder was developed by the school of artillery shortly before the outbreak of the Second World War.

The Garrison Church of St Alban the Martyr was built in 1937 and replaced an earlier wooden church.

During the Second World War War, the garrison was extended again, although primarily for artillery units. The 21st Independent Parachute Company of the 1st Airborne Division was also formed there.

After the Second World War, many of the hutted buildings were replaced with modern structures. The Royal School of Artillery's garrison was rebuilt and permanently established at the site. The Officers' Mess (built 1936–41, designed by William A Ross, Chief Architect to the War Office) is now a Grade II listed building. A new event was started in 1962 to showcase the military's artillery technology – originally named Larkhill Day, it evolved into Royal Artillery Day in 1970.

A primary school opened at Larkhill in 1962.

== Military flying ==
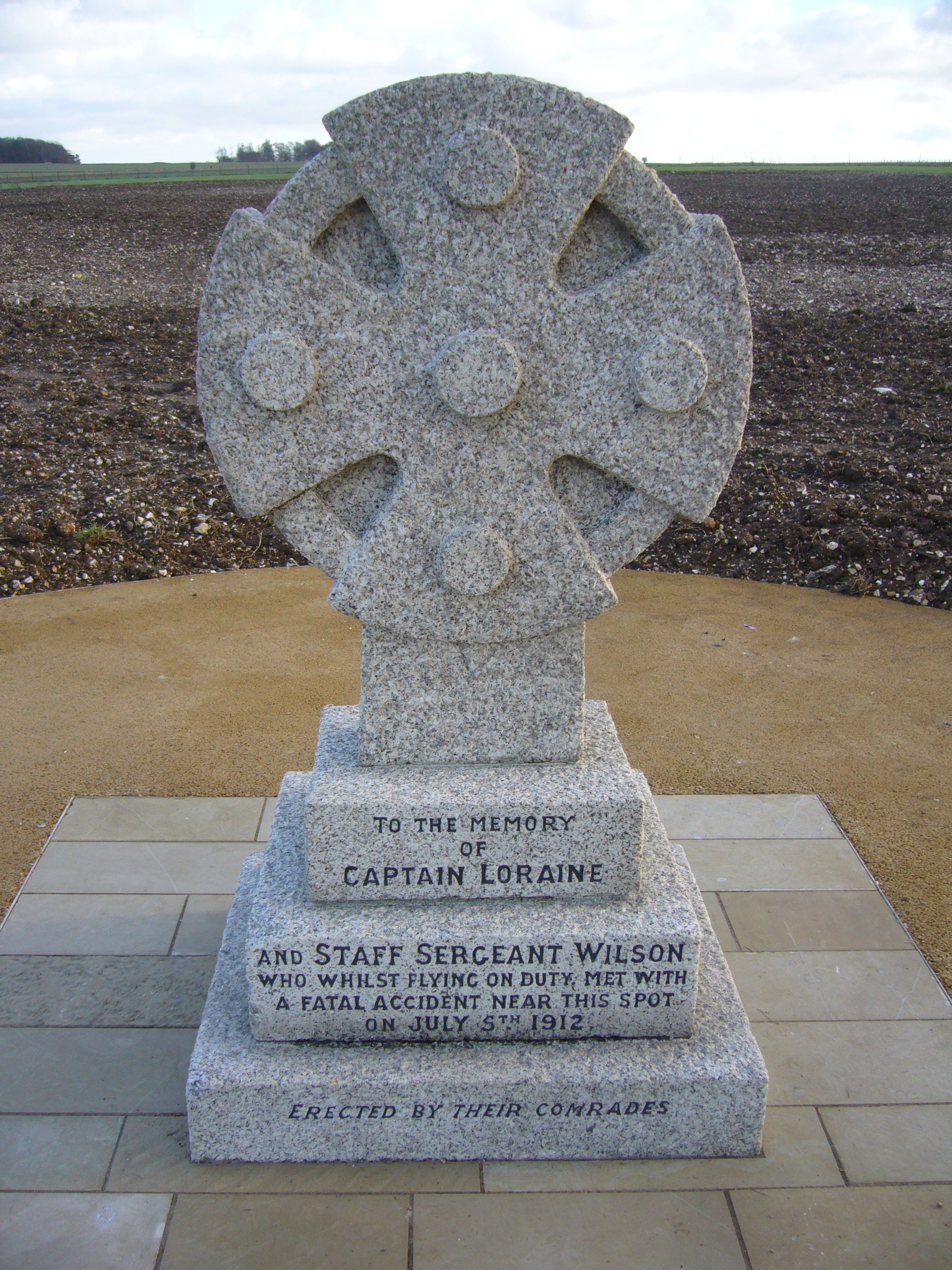
Memorial to Capt Loraine and Staff-Sgt Wilson, killed 1912, outside the Stonehenge Visitors' Centre (December 2013)

In 1909, Horatio Barber, a flying enthusiast, rented a small piece of land in Larkhill. He built a shed to house his new aeroplane, and was soon joined by more enthusiasts. Among these were George Bertram Cockburn, a pioneer aviator, and Captain John Fulton who served with an artillery brigade, and it was partly as a result of their interest that the War Office quickly realised the importance of aircraft and founded the first army aerodrome in Larkhill in 1910. Several more huts were built and a three-bay hangar was constructed by the British and Colonial Aeroplane Company, a forerunner of British Aerospace. In 1911, No. 2 Company of the Air Battalion Royal Engineers was established at Larkhill, the first flying unit of the armed forces to use aeroplanes as opposed to balloons. This evolved into No. 3 Squadron, Royal Flying Corps in May 1912, the first RFC squadron to use aeroplanes.

July 1912 saw the first fatal air crash in the RFC. Captain Eustace Loraine and his observer, Staff-Sergeant R.H.V. Wilson, were killed when they crashed west of Stonehenge after flying from Larkhill aerodrome. A memorial was erected near the A303, and moved to a site near the Stonehenge visitors' centre in 2013. The nearby junction of the A360 with the former A344 is known as Airman's Corner or Airman's Cross.

In August 1912, the first Military Aeroplane Trials were held at Larkhill aerodrome. Several aeroplanes including the Avro Type G and the Bristol Gordon England biplane were entered, and the competition was won by Samuel Franklin Cody in his Cody V aircraft.

The aerodrome was closed in 1914 and hutted garrisons were built over the airstrip. The original BCAC hangar, the oldest surviving aerodrome building in the UK, is at the corner of Woods Road and Fargo Road. It was given Grade II* listed building status in 2005.

== Larkhill Garrison ==
Larkhill Garrison is controlled by Headquarters South West based at Jellalabad Barracks, Tidworth Camp. The following units are based at the garrison:

- Royal Artillery Barracks, Larkhill
  - Headquarters, Royal Artillery
  - 221 (Wessex) Battery, Royal Artillery
  - Royal Artillery Centre for Personal Development, at Royal Artillery Barracks
  - Royal School of Artillery, at Royal Artillery Barracks
    - 14th Regiment, Royal Artillery, at Royal Artillery Barracks
- Purvis Lines
  - 26th Regiment, Royal Artillery
  - 19th Regiment, Royal Artillery
  - 1st Regiment, Royal Horse Artillery
- Roberts Barracks
  - 32nd Regiment, Royal Artillery
- Horne Barracks
  - 47th Regiment Royal, Royal Artillery
- Unknown Barracks
  - 12 Army Education Centre

== Climate ==
Climate data for Larkhill (1991–2020 normals, extremes 1921-)
Month	Jan	Feb	Mar	Apr	May	Jun	Jul	Aug	Sep	Oct	Nov	Dec	Year
Record high °C (°F)	14.8 (58.6)	17.6 (63.7)	21.1 (70.0)	26.2 (79.2)	32.4 (90.3)	35.4 (95.7)	35.7 (96.3)	33.8 (92.8)	30.8 (87.4)	26.5 (79.7)	17.2 (63.0)	14.6 (58.3)	35.7 (96.3)
Mean daily maximum °C (°F)	7.5 (45.5)	8.0 (46.4)	10.5 (50.9)	13.5 (56.3)	16.7 (62.1)	19.6 (67.3)	21.8 (71.2)	21.4 (70.5)	18.6 (65.5)	14.5 (58.1)	10.5 (50.9)	7.9 (46.2)	14.2 (57.6)
Daily mean °C (°F)	4.6 (40.3)	4.8 (40.6)	6.7 (44.1)	8.9 (48.0)	12.0 (53.6)	14.8 (58.6)	16.9 (62.4)	16.7 (62.1)	14.3 (57.7)	11.0 (51.8)	7.4 (45.3)	5.0 (41.0)	10.3 (50.5)
Mean daily minimum °C (°F)	1.7 (35.1)	1.6 (34.9)	2.9 (37.2)	4.4 (39.9)	7.3 (45.1)	10.1 (50.2)	12.1 (53.8)	12.1 (53.8)	10.0 (50.0)	7.5 (45.5)	4.3 (39.7)	2.1 (35.8)	6.4 (43.5)
Record low °C (°F)	−12.8 (9.0)	−12.2 (10.0)	−9.5 (14.9)	−5.0 (23.0)	−4.4 (24.1)	−0.6 (30.9)	3.3 (37.9)	2.8 (37.0)	−0.6 (30.9)	−6.1 (21.0)	−9.4 (15.1)	−11.3 (11.7)	−12.8 (9.0)
Average precipitation mm (inches)	83.5 (3.29)	58.0 (2.28)	54.6 (2.15)	54.1 (2.13)	50.1 (1.97)	55.1 (2.17)	57.0 (2.24)	61.1 (2.41)	60.1 (2.37)	87.7 (3.45)	89.8 (3.54)	87.8 (3.46)	798.8 (31.45)
Average precipitation days (≥ 1.0 mm)	12.7	10.6	10.1	9.6	9.0	8.9	9.1	10.2	9.1	12.2	13.2	12.7	127.4
Source 1: Met Office
Source 2: Starlings Roost Weather

== In popular culture ==
In May 1965, a scene from the Beatles' feature film Help! was filmed at Knighton Down, near the Larkhill army base. The scene included troops of Royal Artillery.

Both the 1982-85 comic book V for Vendetta and its 2005 film adaptation feature a fictional detention centre at Larkhill, where minorities and enemies of the fascist state were eliminated. The writer, Alan Moore, said he chose Larkhill because of the obvious military connections, but also because of a particularly unpleasant hitchhiking trip he had around the area.

== See also ==
- Early Birds of Aviation
- No. 3 Squadron RAF
- Royal Flying Corps

== Bibliography ==
- Crowley, D.A.; Pugh, R.B.; Stevenson, J.H. (1995). A history of Amesbury, Bulford, and Durrington. Trowbridge: Wiltshire County Council. ISBN 0-86080-444-5.
- James, N.D.G. (1987). Plain Soldiering. Salisbury: HobNob Press. ISBN 0-946418-03-9.
- Clarke-Smith, E. (1969). "Salisbury Plain: An historical introduction". Drumbeat. Archived from the original on 7 September 2008.
