= Keith McQueen =

British Army general

Major-General Keith McQueen
- Born: 17 June 1923
- Died: 2 June 2000 (aged 76)
- Military career
- Allegiance: United Kingdom
- Branch: British Army
- Rank: Major-General
- Service number: 331598
- Commands: Royal School of Artillery; North West District
- Conflicts: Second World War

Major-General Keith John McQueen (17 June 1923 – 2 June 2000) was a British Army officer.

== Military career ==
McQueen was commissioned into the Royal Artillery in August 1944 during the Second World War. He became Commander, Royal Artillery for 3rd Infantry Division in 1968, Commandant, Royal School of Artillery in 1973 and General Officer Commanding North West District in 1974 before retiring in 1977.

Military offices
Preceded by Peter Foster	Commandant of the Royal School of Artillery; 1973–1974	Succeeded by John Badley
Preceded by Corran Purdon	GOC North West District; 1974–1977	Succeeded by Peter Sibbald
