= Stonehenge Aerodrome =

Coordinates: 51.177°N 1.833°W

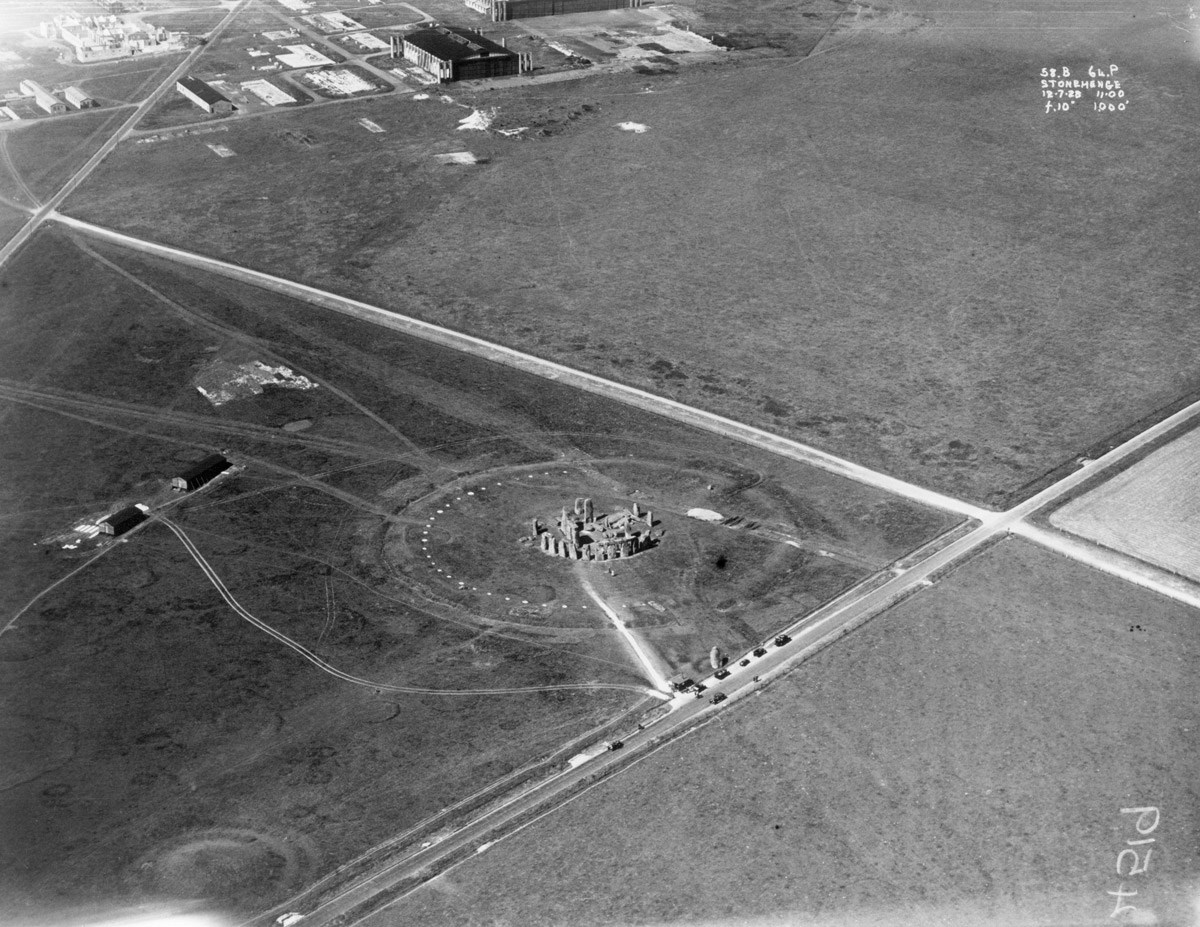
1928 image of Stonehenge with the remains of the aerodrome site in the background

Stonehenge Aerodrome or Stonehenge Airfield was a short-lived military airfield of the Royal Flying Corps on Salisbury Plain in Wiltshire, England, in use from 1917 to 1921. It was built around 300 metres (980 ft) south-west of Stonehenge on the site of existing cottages, and spanned both sides of the New Direct Road turnpike (later designated as the A303). The base was opened in November 1917, construction having started earlier in that year, as part of the scaling up of military flying capability for World War I. The aerodrome was not complete when the war ended, but construction continued past the end of the war.

The airfield closed in 1921, and was fully demolished by the early 1930s as part of a concerted effort to restore the natural landscape around Stonehenge.

== Military use ==
The airfield was used for the training of bomber pilots at the No 1 School of Aerial Navigation and Bomb Dropping. The establishment has been described as a "finishing school" for bomber pilots and navigators, and provided both day and night training. At the height of its activity in mid-1918, 60 day crews and 60 night crews were trained each month. The biography of David Clendon Hale, an American airman attached to the RAF, states that he completed a 32-day course as an observer at the night flying school at Stonehenge in May 1918.

There was also a presence of the Royal Naval Air Service with Handley Page heavy bombers. The No. 108 Squadron RAF unit was formed at Stonehenge (or possibly the nearby Lake Down Aerodrome) in November 1917, and was equipped with Airco DH.9 bombers.

The site was closely linked to Larkhill military camp, and from 1917 the two sites were connected through spurs of the Larkhill Military Light Railway.

In 1919, a flight sergeant from the base was charged with stealing six gallons of petrol and selling it to the local bus company.

=== Closure ===
The Under-secretary of State to the Air Ministry George Tryon was asked in Parliament in early 1920 if the aerodrome was to be pulled down to remove the visual impact on Stonehenge, to which he replied "The retention of the aerodrome at Stonehenge has been the subject of very careful consideration, as the Air Council are in full sympathy with the desire that existing disfigurements in the neighbourhood of Stonehenge should be removed at the earliest moment possible. The station is, however, of great importance to the Royal Air Force owing to its proximity to Larkhill and other artillery camps, and until an alternative arrangement can be found the aerodrome will have to remain".

Flying operations were stopped in 1920, leading to formal closure in 1921, when the last units transferred to the School of Army Co-operation at Old Sarum Airfield. Disused huts and equipment were disposed of by auction.

== After decommissioning ==
=== Return to agriculture ===
After closure of the site, it was reverted to the previous owners, who then sold the site for use as a pig farm. It therefore appears on 1920s maps as the "Pedigree Stock Farm".

In 1921, the Wiltshire Times reported that the derelict site was different to other decommissioned military installations locally, having at least six "huge solidly-built hangars" which they estimated to be 240 feet (73 m) by 190 feet (58 m) in size and built in stone and brick.

=== Restoration ===
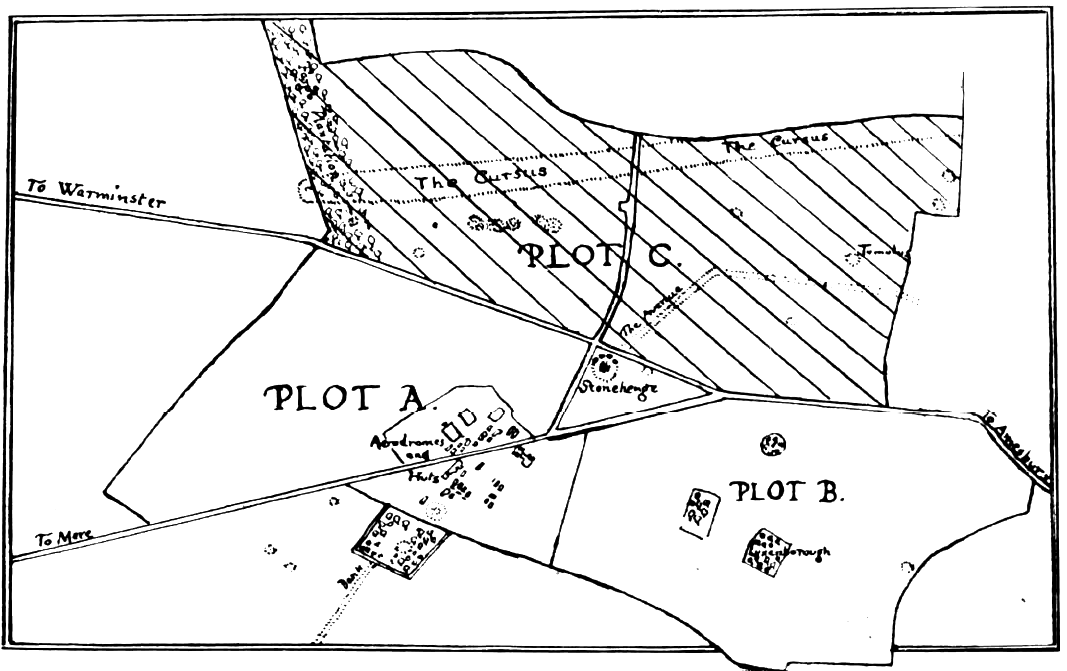
Map showing the three proposed development plots around Stonehenge from 1927, including the former aerodrome

The former aerodrome, now pig farm, was one of the main targets for campaigners who wanted to restore the landscape around Stonehenge to a more natural setting, and the airfield and Amesbury and Military Camp Light Railway were high priorities for removal after the National Trust took possession of the Stonehenge land in 1923.

In 1927 the aerodrome site was put up for sale by the pig farmer, with interest from developers. As a result, a fundraising effort was launched in August 1927 to raise enough money to demolish the aerodrome buildings and buy the land within the "Stonehenge skyline". The subscription target for this was £35,000 and the first £8,000 – with the King as the lead subscriber – was enough to start the demolition in October 1927. The fund continued for a number of years to secure the remaining land around the henge for the nation.

Demolition of buildings took place from 1927, and in 1928 a labourer was killed falling through a roof of one the buildings being demolished. The last of the three largest hangars was demolished in August 1930, and the remaining buildings were cleared from the site in the early 1930s.

The buried iron and concrete from the demolition and levelling of the site can still be seen in magnetometer surveys of the Stonehenge landscape.
