= Thomas MacQueen =

British Army officer

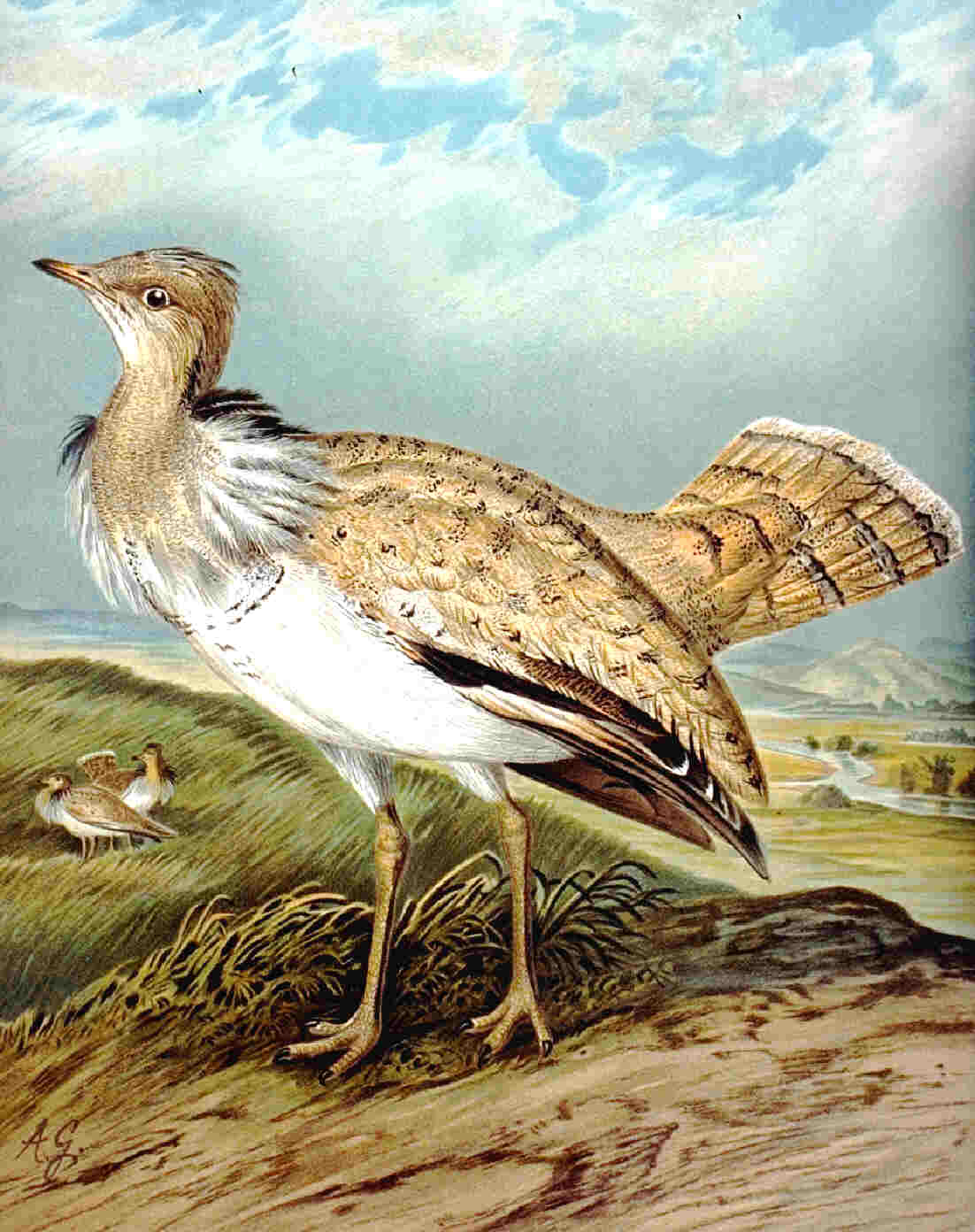
MacQueen's bustard

General Thomas R. MacQueen (c. 1792–1840) was a British Army officer in the 45th Bengal Native Infantry regiment of the British East India Company's Bengal Army.

MacQueen collected natural history specimens in the Himalayas and northwest India. While a major of the 45th, MacQueen presented a specimen of a bustard species he had shot to the British Museum (Natural History) and in 1832 the bird was named for him as the MacQueen's bustard, Chlamydotis macqueenii, by J. E. Gray.
