= Charles Dunbar (British Army officer) =

British Army general

Major-General Charles Dunbar CBE
- Born: 1919
- Died: 1981 (aged 61–62)
- Military career
- Allegiance: United Kingdom
- Branch: British Army
- Service years: 1940−1973
- Rank: Major-General
- Service number: 121519
- Unit: Royal Northumberland Fusiliers
- Commands: North West District
- Conflicts: Second World War
- Awards: Commander of the Order of the British Empire

Major-General Charles Whish Dunbar CBE (1919–1981) was a British Army officer.

== Military career ==
Educated at Glasgow High School and the University of Glasgow, Dunbar was commissioned into the Royal Northumberland Fusiliers 1940 and served with his regiment in North West Europe during the Second World War. He became commanding officer of 1st Battalion Royal Highland Fusiliers in Aden in 1960, commander of 6th Infantry Brigade in West Germany in September 1962 and brigadier on the general staff at Headquarters, Middle East Land Forces in December 1966. He went on to be General Officer Commanding North West District in February 1968 and Director of Infantry at the Ministry of Defence in September 1970 before retiring in December 1973.

He was honorary colonel of the Royal Highland Fusiliers from 1969 to 1979.

Military offices
Preceded by Bala Bredin	GOC North West District; 1968–1970	Succeeded by James Wilson
