= Headquarters South West (United Kingdom) =

- Headquarters South West formation badge (Note: The badge adopted by Headquarters South West was that of the 43rd (Wessex) Infantry Division, and later 43rd (Wessex) Brigade. This badge comprises a yellow 'Wessex Wyvern' superimposed on-top of a blue square.)
- Active: 2014 – present
- Country: United Kingdom
- Branch: British Army
- Type: Regional Point of Command
- Size: Colonel's Command
- Part of: Regional Command
- HQ Location: Jellalabad Barracks, Tidworth Camp

Commanders
- Notable commanders: Colonel Neville Holmes

Headquarters South West (HQ South West) is a Colonel's command of the British Army formed to oversee the area of South West England.

== Background ==
Prior to 2012, the 43rd (Wessex) Brigade had overseen all army units and was the Regional Point of Command (RPC) of the British Army in South West England. However, in 2014, under the Army 2020 programme, 43rd (Wessex) Brigade was absorbed into 1st Artillery Brigade, which had been based at the Airfield Camp, Netheravon since 2005. 43rd Brigade therefore became an integral part of the newly redesignated 1st Artillery Brigade and Headquarters South West. Following this reorganisation, Headquarters South West was established under the command of the Chief of Staff (2nd in command) of 1st Artillery Brigade & HQ South West.

== Formation ==
In 2014, the new command was stood up and established its headquarters at Jellalabad Barracks, Tidworth Camp alongside the new brigade's location. The new headquarters oversaw the region overseen by 43rd (W) Brigade prior to its redesignation, which included the following: City and County of Bristol, Channel Islands, Cornwall, Devonshire, Dorset, Gloucestershire, Somerset, and Wiltshire. In addition to the counties which were overseen by the headquarters, some of the Army's largest garrisons form part of the region, including Blandford Garrison; Tidworth, Netheravon, and Bulford Garrison; Corsham Station; and Wyvern Station.

Following a reorganisation of Force Troops Command in August 2019, the 1st Artillery Brigade dropped its regional responsibilities and joined 3rd (United Kingdom) Division. Thenceforth, Headquarters South West became an independent formation under control of Regional Command.

== Service ==
The commander who holds the title of 'Commander, Headquarters South West' is also designated as 'Director Ten Tors', which is an annual hike held in Dartmoor, Devonshire.

On 16 October 2020, Headquarters South West was awarded the Firmin Sword of Peace by HM Queen Elizabeth II and Prince William, Duke of Cambridge following its support to the City of Salisbury after the poisoning of Sergei and Yulia Skripal in March 2018.

== Organisation ==
The administrative organisation of the headquarters is as follows:

- Headquarters South West, at Jellalabad Barracks, Tidworth Camp
  - Headquarters South West Personnel Recovery Unit, at Wyvern Barracks, Exeter
  - Headquarters South West Cadet Training Team, at Airfield Camp, Netheravon
  - City and County of Bristol Army Cadet Force, in Keynsham
  - Cornwall Army Cadet Force, in Bodmin
  - Devon Army Cadet Force, in Exeter
  - Dorset Army Cadet Force, in Dorchester
  - Gloucestershire Army Cadet Force, in Cheltenham
  - Somerset Army Cadet Force, at Jellalabad Barracks, Taunton
  - Wiltshire Army Cadet Force, at Le Marchant Barracks, Devizes
