= Amesbury and Military Camp Light Railway =

The Amesbury and Military Camp Light Railway (also known as the Bulford Camp Railway) was a branch line in Wiltshire, England, constructed under a light railway order, the Amesbury and Military Camp Light Railway Order 1898, dated 24 September 1898. It was opened for military traffic from Amesbury to the east-facing Newton Tony Junction (on the London and South Western Railway main line from Andover to Salisbury, part of the West of England line) on 1 October 1901. A west-facing junction, Amesbury Junction, where the branch burrowed under the main line, opened on 2 June 1902. The line closed in 1963.

== Previous proposals ==
Although the line did not open until the early 1900s, various other proposals had been put forward, but none had succeeded in being built. Before the Bulford Camp branch opened, all nearby railway routes had skirted Salisbury Plain, but none led through it.

=== Bristol and London and South Western Junction Railway ===
This was a proposal by the London and South Western Railway (LSWR) which was designed, essentially, to poach traffic from the Great Western Railway. A bill was deposited in Parliament in November 1882, for a line to branch away from the LSWR between Salisbury and Basingstoke at a point around two miles west of Grateley railway station. It would cross the plain via Amesbury and Shrewton to Westbury and then on to Bristol via either the Somerset and Dorset Joint Railway or the North Somerset Railway. The Great Western Railway was bitterly opposed to this plan and succeeded in defeating it in 1883.

=== Pewsey and Salisbury Railway ===
Pewsey and Salisbury Railway Act 1883 (Note: Section 1.)
- Act of Parliament
- Parliament of the United Kingdom
- Long title: An Act to authorise the making of a Railway in Wiltshire to be called the Pewsey and Salisbury Railway.
- Citation: 46 & 47 Vict. c. cxiii
- Territorial extent: United Kingdom

Dates
- Royal assent: 16 July 1883
- Commencement: 16 July 1883 (Note: The Acts of Parliament (Commencement) Act 1793.)
- Repealed: 11 May 1891

Other legislation
- Repealed by: Pewsey and Salisbury Railway (Abandonment) Act 1891

Status: Repealed

Pewsey and Salisbury Railway (Extension of Time) Act 1886
- Act of Parliament
- Parliament of the United Kingdom
- Long title: An Act to confer further Powers on the Pewsey and Salisbury Railway Company.
- Citation: 49 & 50 Vict. c. xxviii
- Territorial extent: United Kingdom

Dates
- Royal assent: 4 June 1886
- Commencement: 4 June 1886
- Repealed: 11 May 1891

Other legislation
- Repealed by: Pewsey and Salisbury Railway (Abandonment) Act 1891

Status: Repealed

Text of statute as originally enacted

Pewsey and Salisbury Railway (Abandonment) Act 1891
- Act of Parliament
- Parliament of the United Kingdom
- Long title: An Act for the abandonment of the Pewsey and Salisbury Railway.
- Citation: 54 & 55 Vict. c. x
- Territorial extent: United Kingdom

Dates
- Royal assent: 11 May 1891
- Commencement: 11 May 1891
- Repealed: 31 January 2013

Other legislation
- Repeals/revokes: Pewsey and Salisbury Railway Act 1883; Pewsey and Salisbury Railway (Extension of Time) Act 1886
- Repealed by: Statute Law (Repeals) Act 2013

Status: Repealed

Text of statute as originally enacted

Having defeated the scheme of the LSWR, the Great Western Railway then put forward a scheme of its own. This proposed a route from Pewsey railway station on their main line, leading south over the Plain and then onward to Southampton. However, Southampton was considered to be within LSWR territory, and the encroachment was opposed in much the same way as the B&L&SWJR had been. Although a section between Pewsey and Salisbury was authorised on 16 January 1883, this was never built.

=== Light railways ===
No more schemes were proposed until the passing of the Light Railways Act 1896 (59 & 60 Vict. c. 48). The Great Western Railway swiftly saw the advantages of this approach and proposed a route which was very similar to their failed scheme of 1883. This light railway was to run up the Avon valley from Bemerton (near Salisbury) to Amesbury via Stratford, Woodford, Durnford and Wilsford. From Amesbury, the line was to continue to follow the Avon upstream to Pewsey via Durrington, Netheravon, Upavon and Manningford. The line was authorised by the Great Western Railway (Pewsey and Salisbury) Light Railway Order 1898 on 6 August 1898.

In the meantime, the War Office had been purchasing large areas of Salisbury Plain, and had already commenced negotiations with the LSWR for a light railway, very like the 1882 scheme. This would run from Grateley station and over the Plain, via Newton Tony and Amesbury, to a terminus just east of Shrewton, making the line 10 miles and 62 chains long. It was intended to serve both the new military camps and the agricultural community. This line was authorised as the Amesbury and Military Camp Light Railway. Of the two proposals, this scheme won out because the Great Western Railway's proposal involved crossing over four miles of land owned by the War Office, which was supporting the LSWR.

== Construction ==
The LSWR awarded the contract for the railway to Joseph Firbank, who was already involved with other work in the area, principally the Basingstoke and Alton Light Railway. He is also believed to have been the contractor who worked on the Charnwood Forest Railway. Although the line was officially a light railway, it was built to far more substantial standards, with heavy engineering works required. The way was laid with steel bullhead rails weighing 87lbs (heavier than some ordinary railways) and land had been obtained for double tracks, which was unusual for a light railway. In the event, the track was doubled.

== Opening ==
The line opened to goods on 26 April 1902 and passenger traffic commenced on 2 June 1902. From the outset, the line was worked by the L&SWR. When passenger services commenced, the first train to arrive at Amesbury brought the newspapers announcing the end of the South African War.

== Operation ==
Traffic consisted of six passenger trains and one goods train per day. The line was extended to Bulford on 1 June 1906 and, at some stage, under the Amesbury and Military Camp Light Railway (Bulford Extension) Order 1903, to Bulford Camp.

== World War I extensions ==
Further extensions were constructed during World War I, consisting of lines from Amesbury to Larkhill Military Camp, and then westward to Rollestone Camp where there was a balloon school. A further extension was added south-east from Rollestone to Fargo, where there was a military hospital; this line then dividing with one branch going south to Druid's Lodge and one to Stonehenge Aerodrome. Aircraft hangars existed at both these locations. These extensions were operated by the R.O.D. (Railway Operating Division) of the Royal Engineers and they remained in use until about 1923.

== Closure ==
The stations closed in 1952 along with Amesbury junction. The branch as a whole (including Newton Tony junction) ceased goods traffic in 1963. Part of its route became the Winterbourne Downs nature reserve, owned by the Royal Society for the Protection of Birds. Although there has been significant development in the region since the closure, it is still possible to trace the original route that the railway took from aerial photographs. In many places, the railway trackbed now forms footpaths and bridlepaths, and elsewhere it is possible to identify the route in agricultural fields. The platform at Sling Camp remains in undergrowth behind a building housing the Sling borehole on Tidworth Road. An old railway signal can be found in Bulford, at the junction between Double Hedges and Newmans Way.
