= Bulford =

Village and civil parish in Wiltshire, England, close to Salisbury Plain

Coordinates: 51.190°N 1.761°W

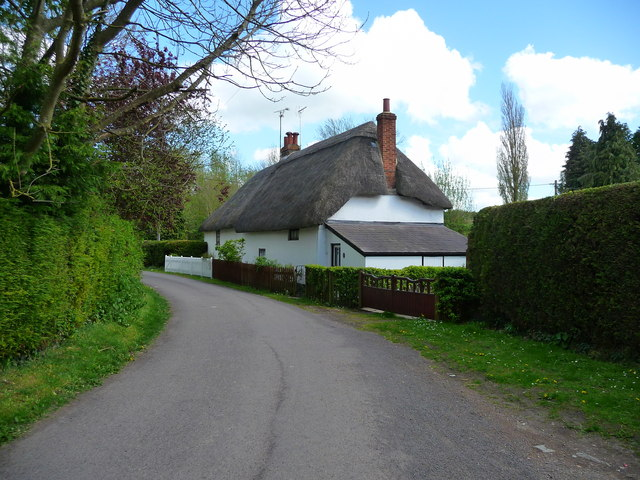
- Old Coach Road, Bulford

- Location within Wiltshire
- Population: 5,388 (in 2021)
- OS grid reference: SU168434
- Civil parish: Bulford
- Unitary authority: Wiltshire
- Ceremonial county: Wiltshire
- Region: South West
- Country: England
- Sovereign state: United Kingdom
- Post town: Salisbury
- Postcode district: SP4
- Dialling code: 01980
- Police: Wiltshire
- Fire: Dorset and Wiltshire
- Ambulance: South Western
- UK Parliament: East Wiltshire
- Website: Parish Council

Bulford is a village and civil parish in Wiltshire, England, near Salisbury Plain. The village is close to Durrington and about 1.5 miles (2.4 km) north of the town of Amesbury. The Bulford Camp army base is separate from the village but within the parish.

The Salisbury Avon forms the western boundary of the parish, and the village is near the confluence of the Nine Mile River with the Avon.

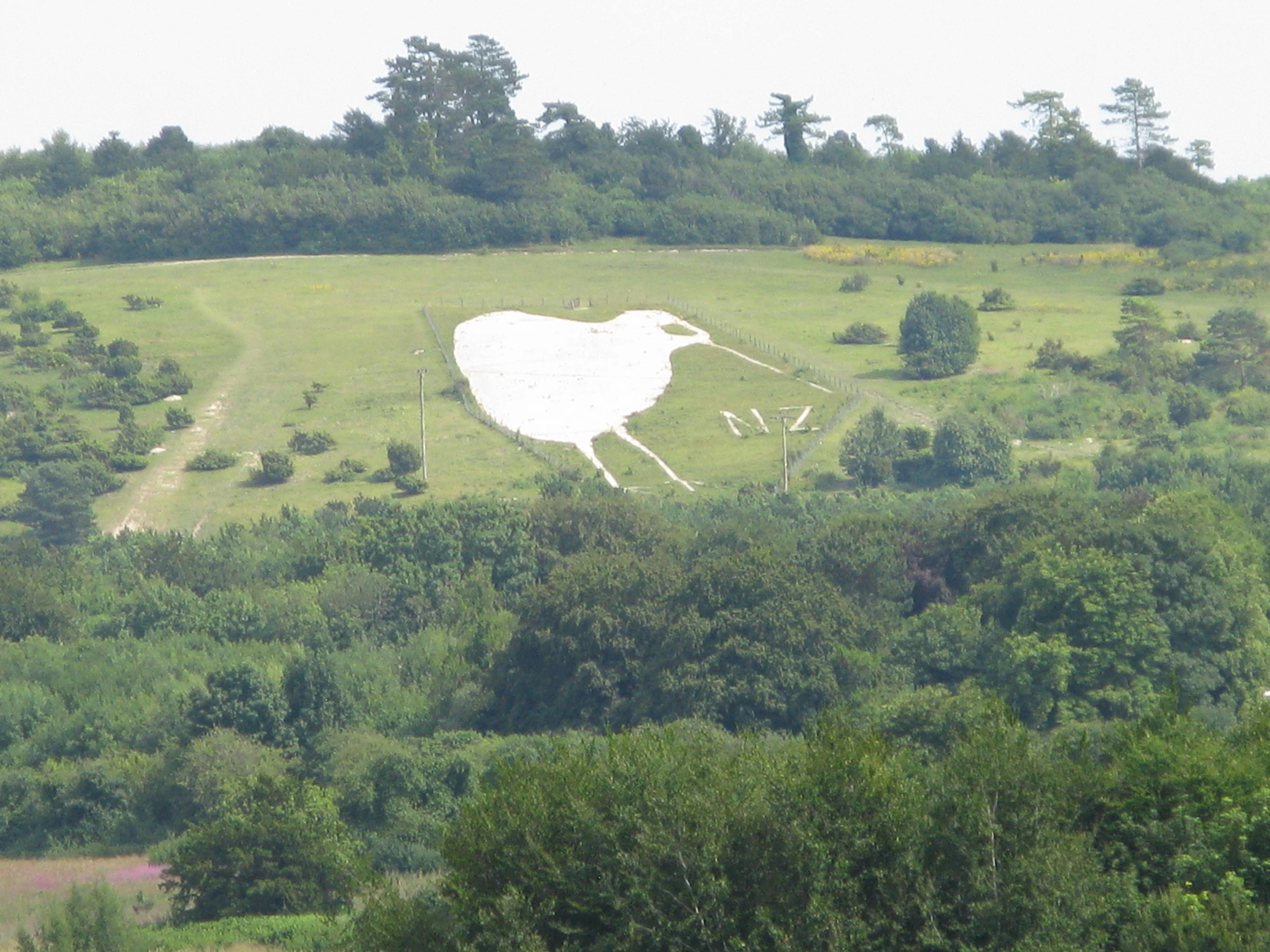
The Bulford Kiwi

The Bulford Kiwi – a large chalk representation of a kiwi – is on a hill above the village.

== History ==
Evidence of occupation of the area in the late Neolithic era is provided by many round barrows on the downs. A Bronze Age boundary ditch is in the northeast of the parish. The Bulford solar alignment, possibly a prototype for nearby Stonehenge, is located within the modern village.

The 1086 Domesday Book recorded 39 households at Bulford, within an estate of Amesbury Abbey.

The name is derived from the Old English bulut ieg ford meaning 'ragged robin island ford'. It is recorded in the Wiltshire Charter Rolls of 1199 as Bultiford and as Bultesforda in 1270. It is then recorded as Bulteforde in the Ecclesiastical Tax Records of 1291.

From 1897, land east of Bulford began to be used by the Army as Bulford Camp. In 1906 the Amesbury and Military Camp Light Railway was extended from Amesbury into the camp and a station was provided at Bulford, on the southern edge of the village where the line crossed the road which is now the A3028. The line closed to passengers in 1952 but goods services continued until 1963.

== Governance ==
The civil parish elects a parish council. It is in the area of Wiltshire Council, a unitary authority which is responsible for most local government functions. The Amesbury East & Bulford electoral division covers the east side of Amesbury as well as Bulford parish, and elects one member to Wiltshire Council.

== Religious sites ==
=== Parish church ===
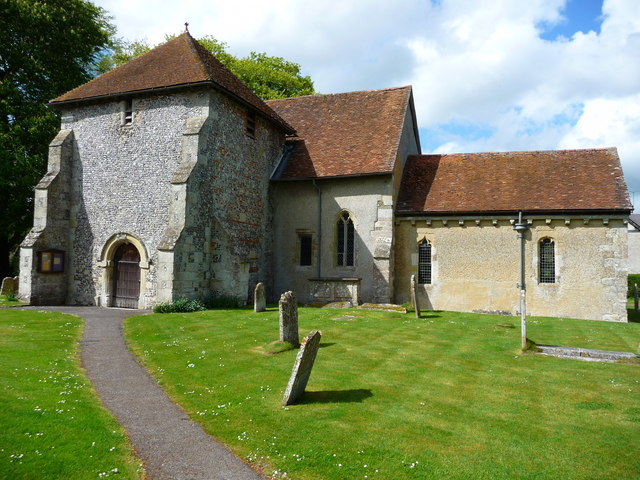
Parish church

The Church of England parish church of St Leonard, to the west of the village near the Avon, is from the late 12th century and is a Grade I listed building. Alterations were made in the 13th century (probably including the addition of the tower), and again in the 14th and 16th. The foundations of the tower proved to be inadequate and its height was reduced, probably in the 16th century. In the 19th century a north transept was added. Restoration in 1902–11 was directed by C.E. Ponting.

Today the church is part of the Avon River team ministry.

=== Independent chapel ===
Bulford Independent Congregational Chapel was built towards the south of the village in 1828 to replace an earlier meeting house. As of 2016 the chapel is still in use and the congregation is associated with the Evangelical Fellowship of Congregational Churches.

=== Bulford Camp ===
Bulford Camp has an Anglican church, St George's (1920s) and a Catholic church, Our Lady Queen of Peace (1960s).

== Schools ==
Bulford St Leonard's CE (VA) Primary School serves the village. An elementary school was built on the High Street in 1874, replacing a school founded in 1758 which was housed in a cottage near the church. Following the expansion of the village in the 1960s, the present building was opened in 1971 on a new site towards the northeast of the village.

Avondale School is an independent preparatory school for children aged 2–11. The school was founded in Amesbury and has been on Bulford's High Street since 1957.

Bulford Camp has a primary school called Kiwi Primary School.
