= Tidworth Camp =

Military installation at Tidworth in Wiltshire, England

- Tidworth
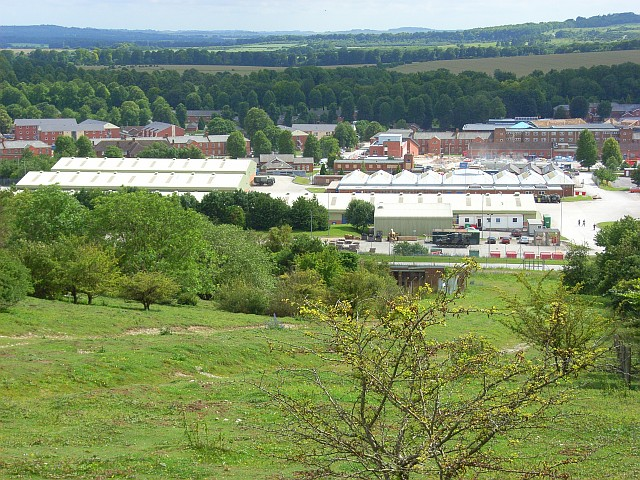
- Tidworth camp from Clarendon Hill.

Site information
- Type: Barracks
- Owner: Ministry of Defence
- Operator: British Army

Location
- Location within Wiltshire
- Coordinates: 51.23217°N 1.67451°W

Site history
- Built: 1897
- Built for: War Office
- In use: 1897–present

Garrison information
- Occupants: Various

Tidworth Camp is a military installation at Tidworth in Wiltshire, England. It forms part of the Tidworth, Netheravon and Bulford (TidNBul) Garrison.

== History ==
The Camp was established when the War Office acquired a 19th-century mansion – Tedworth House – and large tracts of land to its north in 1897. Headquarters Southern Command was established at Tidworth Camp in 1905.

Lucknow Barracks and Mooltan Barracks were completed in 1905, Tidworth Military Hospital was finished in 1907. Aliwal Barracks, Assaye Barracks, Bhurtpore Barracks, Candahar Barracks, Delhi Barracks and Jellalabad Barracks were added later, and a Royal Ordnance depot was established during the First World War. The barracks are named for battles in India and Afghanistan: Aliwal, Assaye, Bhurtpore, Candahar, Delhi, Jellalabad, Lucknow and Mooltan. (Jellalabad Barracks should not be confused with the former barracks of the same name in Taunton, Somerset).

There was also an army hospital during the First World War. A description of it, including actions taken to address a suspected meningitis outbreak, is provided by Arthur Bullock, who spent around a week there in 1918.

In the Second World War, the Camp was home from 1942 to 1944 to various formations of the United States Army including 7th Armored Division (14 June to 7 August 1944), 9th Armored Division, and 8th Armored Division. HQ Southern Command left the Camp and moved to Erskine Barracks near Fugglestone St Peter in 1949. The military hospital closed in March 1977.

Extensive reconstruction at the Camp involving 160 new or refurbished buildings was carried out under Project Allenby Connaught between 2006 and 2014.

Tedworth House had various military uses, including providing accommodation for nurses; from 1977 to 2011 it was the Officers' Mess for the Camp. It is now a recovery centre operated by the Help for Heroes charity.

== Military cemetery ==
Tidworth Military Cemetery, north of the Camp and surrounded by farmland, is under the care of the Commonwealth War Graves Commission. 417 First World War burials from Tidworth, and from Fargo Military Hospital near Larkhill, include many of Australian or New Zealand servicemen. There are also 106 graves of the Second World War and 40 of other nationalities.

== Former branch railway ==
A branch from the Midland and South Western Junction Railway at Ludgershall was built in 1901 and opened to passengers in 1902. Goods tracks known as Tidworth Military Railway continued west from Tidworth station into the military area. The branch returned to military control in 1955 and was closed in 1963.

== Barracks ==
The barracks which encompass the camp include:

- Aliwal Barracks
  - King's Royal Hussars
  - Royal Tank Regiment
- Assaye Barracks
  - Queen's Royal Hussars
  - 2nd Medical Regiment, Royal Army Medical Service
  - 3rd Armoured Close Support Battalion, Royal Electrical and Mechanical Engineers
- Bhurtpore Barracks
  - 1st Medical Regiment, Royal Army Medical Service
- Candahar Barracks
  - 10 Army Education Centre Group, Adjutant General's Corps
- Delhi Barracks
  - Headquarters, 3rd Deep Reconnaissance Strike Brigade
  - 6th Armoured Close Support Battalion, Royal Electrical and Mechanical Engineers
- Jellalabad Barracks
  - Headquarters South West
  - 4th Armoured Close Support Battalion, Royal Electrical and Mechanical Engineers
- Lucknow Barracks
  - 1st Battalion, Royal Welsh
  - British Army Bands Tidworth
    - Band of the Royal Artillery
    - Band of the Corps of Royal Engineers
    - Band of the Adjutant General's Corps
- Mooltan Barracks
  - 1st Battalion, Royal Regiment of Fusiliers
