= Bulford Camp =

Military camp on Salisbury Plain in Wiltshire, England

- Bulford
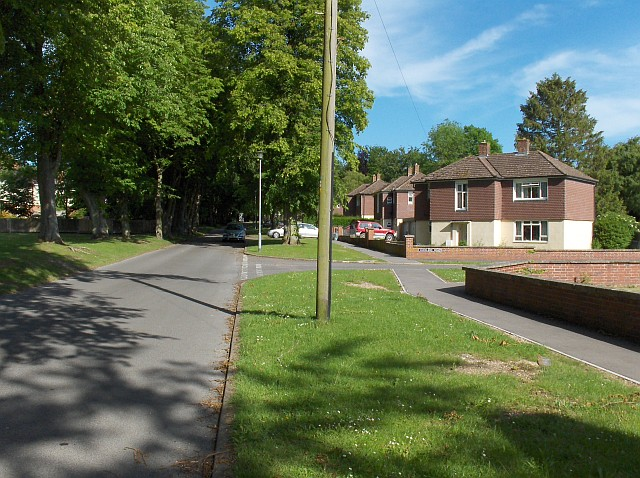
- Gaza Road, Bulford Camp

Site information
- Type: Military Base
- Owner: Ministry of Defence
- Operator: British Army
- Controlled by: Headquarters South West

Location
- Location within Wiltshire
- Coordinates: 51°11′28″N 1°44′03″W

Site history
- Built: 1897
- Built for: War Office
- In use: 1897–present

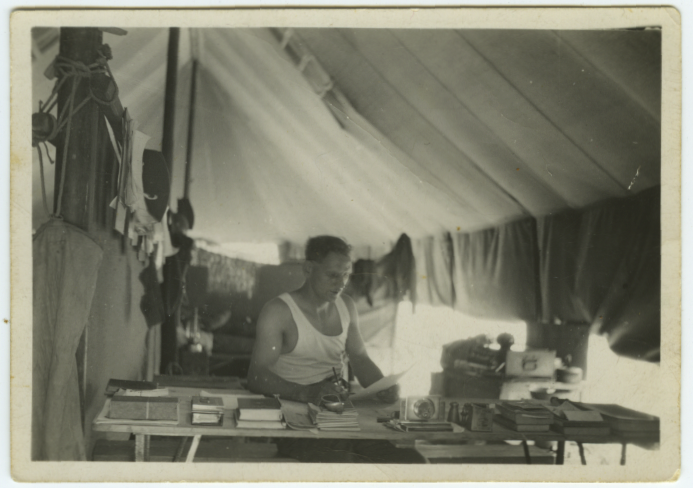
Cpl. O'Sullivan at Bulford Camp

Bulford Camp is a military camp on Salisbury Plain in Wiltshire, England. Established in 1897, the site continues in use as a large British Army base. The camp is close to the village of Bulford and is about 2 1/4 miles (3.6 km) north-east of the town of Amesbury. The camp forms part of the Tidworth, Netheravon and Bulford (TidNBul) Garrison.

== History ==
The camp was built as a mixture of tents and huts in 1897. The section called Sling Camp was occupied by soldiers of the New Zealand Expeditionary Force during the First World War. At the end of the war, the overcrowded camp was the site of the Battle of Bulford, when New Zealand troops staged a brief mutiny. Later, New Zealanders awaiting demobilization left their mark by creating the Bulford Kiwi, a large chalk figure on the hillside overlooking the camp.

Permanent barracks were built during the inter-war years: the current names were applied in 1931. Carter Barracks, a hutted camp north of Bulford Droveway, beyond the northern boundary of the present site, were built in 1939-40 and demolished in 1978.

Headquarters South West District was established at the camp in 1967, but was disbanded on the formation of HQ Land Command in 1995.

== Today ==
The modern-day Bulford Camp is on two sites, separated by Marlborough Road, altogether about 290 acres (116 ha). The eastern area contains Picton Barracks which since 1992 has housed the headquarters of 3rd (UK) Division and its Signals Regiment. Kiwi Barracks, where many of the streets are named after New Zealand towns, houses 3rd Regiment Royal Military Police. 5th Battalion The Rifles moved to Bulford Camp from Germany in 2016.

The western side contains Ward Barracks which houses the headquarters of 12th Armoured Infantry Brigade. The headquarters of the former Special Investigation Branch of the Royal Military Police was housed at Campion Lines, until it was disbanded in 2022.

The Household Cavalry Regiment moved from Combermere Barracks to Bulford Camp in May 2019.

For administrative reasons, the camp falls under the command of Headquarters South West, based at Tidworth Camp.

The camp forms part of the Salisbury Plain 'Super Garrison'.

== Composition ==
The current camp includes the following units (separated by barracks/lines):

- Kiwi Barracks
  - Headquarters, 3rd Regiment, Royal Military Police
    - 158 Provost Company, Royal Military Police
- Picton Barracks
  - Headquarters, 3rd (United Kingdom) Division
  - Headquarters, 25 (Close Support) Engineer Group
  - 3rd (United Kingdom) Divisional Signal Regiment, Royal Corps of Signals
  - 1st Battalion, Mercian Regiment
- Ward Barracks
  - Headquarters, 12th Armoured Infantry Brigade
  - 4 Military Intelligence Battalion, Intelligence Corps
  - 5th Battalion, The Rifles
  - 6 Platoon, B Company, 7th Battalion, The Rifles (Army Reserve)
  - 19 Tank Transporter Squadron, 27 Regiment, Royal Logistic Corps
- Wing Barracks
  - Headquarters, 20th Armoured Infantry Brigade
- Powle Lines
  - Household Cavalry Regiment
- Campion Lines
  - Defence Serious Crime Unit (DSCU)

== Churches ==
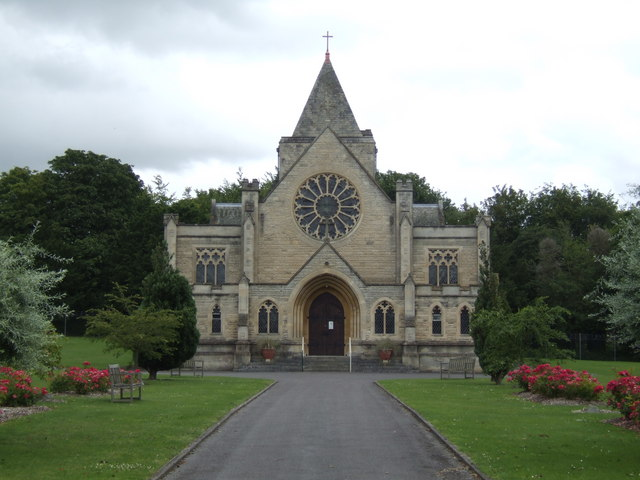
Church of St George, Bulford Camp

The garrison church of St George was built in 1920–1927. Pevsner describes it as "large, Perpendicular, spick and span and smug".

The Catholic church of Our Lady Queen of Peace was built in 1968, replacing a church of Our Lady of Victories which was opened in 1925. The 1968 church was demolished in 2025 owing to its poor structural condition.

== Schools ==
Kiwi Primary School, under County Council control since 1948, serves the garrison from a building which was opened in 1965.

The first school at the camp was opened in Wing Barracks before 1915, then transferred to the County Council in 1948 and renamed Wing County Junior School in 1955. In 1963 this school was combined with Kiwi Infants' County School to form the present Kiwi School. Until 1997 there was a second primary school, Haig County Primary School.

== Former railway ==
In 1906 the Amesbury and Military Camp Light Railway was extended from Amesbury into the garrison. The station within the garrison was the terminus for personnel while a goods track extended into Sling Camp. This extension was removed in 1933; the whole line closed to passengers in 1952 but goods services continued until 1963.
