= Grade II* listed buildings in Wiltshire (A–G) =

Wiltshire shown in England

There are over 20,000 Grade II* listed buildings in England. This article comprises a list of these buildings in the county of Wiltshire.

== List ==
Name	Location	Type	Completed (Note: The date given is the date used by Historic England as significant for the initial building or that of an important part in the structure's description.)	Date designated	Grid ref. (Note: The grid reference is based on the British national grid reference system, sometimes known as OSGB36, used by the Ordnance Survey.) Geo-coordinates	Entry number (Note: The "List Entry Number" is a unique number assigned to each listed building and scheduled monument by Historic England.)	Image
Abbey House, Annexe to rear of Abbey House	Bradford-on-Avon, Wiltshire	House	16th century	18 April 1952	ST8245960941; 51°20′50″N 2°15′12″W	1364543	Abbey House, Annexe to rear of Abbey House More images
Adam House	The Green, Calne, Wiltshire	House	17th century	19 May 1950	SU0002370794; 51°26′10″N 2°00′04″W	1247413	Upload Photo
Alderbury House	Alderbury, Wiltshire	Country House	Late 18th century	23 March 1960	SU1813426818; 51°02′26″N 1°44′34″W	1023788	Upload Photo
Alexander House	Corsham, Wiltshire	House	Early 18th century	20 December 1960	ST8720170389; 51°25′56″N 2°11′08″W	1183086	Alexander House More images
Angel Hotel and Motel and Stables attached to the Rear	Chippenham, Wiltshire	Hotel	17th century	25 April 1950	ST9213573194; 51°27′28″N 2°06′53″W	1268061	Angel Hotel and Motel and Stables attached to the Rear More images
Applegarth	Ogbourne St George, Wiltshire	House	17th century	2 September 1986	SU1969774526; 51°28′10″N 1°43′04″W	1033826	Upload Photo
Arch in Garden to South of Abbey House	Malmesbury, Wiltshire	Arch	12th century	1 July 1976	ST9334787345; 51°35′06″N 2°05′51″W	1269285	Upload Photo
Arlington House	Trowbridge, Wiltshire	Town House	Early 18th century	29 December 1950	ST8544858050; 51°19′17″N 2°12′37″W	1364231	Arlington House
Arundells	Salisbury, Wiltshire	Clergy House	Rebuilt in the late 17th century	28 February 1952	SU1411629644; 51°03′57″N 1°48′00″W	1254399	Arundells More images
Ashton House	Steeple Ashton, Wiltshire	House	16th century	11 September 1968	ST9066356884; 51°18′40″N 2°08′07″W	1252656	Upload Photo
Avon House and attached Walls, Piers and Railings	Malmesbury, Wiltshire	House	17th century	18 January 1949	ST9314687368; 51°35′06″N 2°06′01″W	1269554	Avon House and attached Walls, Piers and Railings More images
Baluster Bridge and Gate Piers	Grounds of Amesbury Abbey, Amesbury	Gate	1775	10 January 1953	SU1495341888; 51°10′34″N 1°47′15″W	1131082	Baluster Bridge and Gate Piers
Bank House, later Marlborough House	Westbury, Wiltshire	House	Early 18th century	29 December 1950	ST8733651556; 51°15′47″N 2°10′58″W	1036306	Bank House, later Marlborough House More images
Baptist Chapel	Bratton, Wiltshire	Church School	1734	11 September 1968	ST9138752553; 51°16′19″N 2°07′29″W	1036507	Upload Photo
Barford House	Devizes, Wiltshire	House	18th century	7 September 1970	SU0042261384; 51°21′06″N 1°59′43″W	1252314	Barford House More images
Barn at Church Farm	Atworth, Wiltshire	Barn	16th century	29 January 1988	ST8587765704; 51°23′25″N 2°12′16″W	1250764	Upload Photo
Barn at Manor Farm	Kingston Deverill, Wiltshire	Barn	Early 19th century	1 July 1986	ST8474937125; 51°07′59″N 2°13′10″W	1364330	Upload Photo
Barn at Old Manor Farm	Winterslow, Wiltshire	Timber Framed Barn	C16-C17	29 May 1987	SU2321032248; 51°05′21″N 1°40′12″W	1130775	Upload Photo
Barn at Roche Old Court	Winterslow, Wiltshire	Aisled Barn	16th century or early 17th century	23 March 1960	SU2462534059; 51°06′19″N 1°38′59″W	1130772	Barn at Roche Old Court
Barn at Wick Farm	Lacock, Wiltshire	Cruck Barn	15th century	20 December 1960	ST9022167894; 51°24′36″N 2°08′31″W	1022204	Upload Photo
Barn South East of Farmhouse, Church Farm	West Dean, Wiltshire	Barn	early-mid 17th century	23 March 1960	SU2559427317; 51°02′41″N 1°38′11″W	1313136	Upload Photo
Barn to the South West of Manor Farmhouse	Crudwell, Wiltshire	Barn	Medieval	16 July 1987	ST9564292844; 51°38′04″N 2°03′52″W	1181760	Upload Photo
Barn, Granary and Cowshed to the South East of Manor Farmhouse	Hankerton, Wiltshire	Barn	16th century	2 May 1977	ST9774990895; 51°37′01″N 2°02′02″W	1022243	Upload Photo
Barton Bridge	Bradford-on-Avon, Wiltshire	Bridge	14th century	18 April 1952	ST8225660549; 51°20′37″N 2°15′22″W	1364494	Barton Bridge More images
Bathampton House	Steeple Langford, Wiltshire	Country House	1694	23 March 1960	SU0170938030; 51°08′30″N 1°58′37″W	1146200	Upload Photo
Battle House	Bromham, Wiltshire	House	c. 1740	19 March 1962	ST9627965286; 51°23′12″N 2°03′17″W	1033892	Upload Photo
Baverstock Manor	Dinton, Wiltshire	Cross Passage House	16th century	23 March 1960	SU0276732145; 51°05′19″N 1°57′43″W	1318738	Baverstock Manor More images
Beanacre Manor with Dairy	Beanacre, Melksham Without, Wiltshire	House	Circa 1595-1600	13 February 1985	ST9008265734; 51°23′26″N 2°08′38″W	1364152	Upload Photo
Bell and Crown Inn (now The Cloisters)	Salisbury, Wiltshire	House	18th century	28 February 1952	SU1456529771; 51°04′02″N 1°47′37″W	1355827	Bell and Crown Inn (now The Cloisters) More images
Bemerton Rectory	Salisbury, Wiltshire	Vicarage	1470 origins	28 February 1952	SU1185930717; 51°04′32″N 1°49′56″W	1065774	Bemerton Rectory More images
Black Barn Cottage	Steeple Ashton, Wiltshire	House	16th century	11 September 1968	ST9067656789; 51°18′36″N 2°08′07″W	1262168	Upload Photo
Blue Boar Inn (medieval building to rear of Nos 41 and 44 (consecutive))	Salisbury, Wiltshire	Inn	Dated by document 1444	6 May 1959	SU1442830111; 51°04′13″N 1°47′44″W	1039141	Blue Boar Inn (medieval building to rear of Nos 41 and 44 (consecutive))
Bolehyde Manor	Allington, Chippenham Without, Wiltshire	House	Mid 17th century	1 June 1952	ST8926375620; 51°28′46″N 2°09′22″W	1283450	Bolehyde Manor More images
Bonham Cottage & Bonham House	Stourton, Wiltshire	House	Late 19th century	17 December 1954	ST7726733210; 51°05′52″N 2°19′34″W	1131128	Upload Photo
Boundary Wall to front of Heathcote House	Devizes, Wiltshire	Gate Pier		19 September 1972	SU0081861184; 51°20′59″N 1°59′23″W	1252377	Upload Photo
Bratton House	Bratton, Wiltshire	Detached House	1715	11 September 1968	ST9161852513; 51°16′18″N 2°07′18″W	1036520	Bratton House More images
Brimslade Farmhouse	Wootton Rivers, Wiltshire	Farmhouse	C16-C17	30 October 1987	SU2095963389; 51°22′09″N 1°42′01″W	1035724	Upload Photo
British Rail Engineering Limited Swindon Works, No 13 Shop (old L2 Shop)	Swindon	Crane	1876	18 May 1984	SU1403084977; 51°33′49″N 1°47′56″W	1023520	Upload Photo
British Rail Engineering Limited: Swindon Works, No 12 Shop (v Shop), O and E Shop (32, 33 and 35 Shops)	Swindon, Swindon	Boiler Shop	1874	18 May 1984	SU1409284876; 51°33′45″N 1°47′53″W	1199356	Upload Photo
Brunton House	Brunton, Wiltshire	House	Late C17-Early 18th century	4 June 1952	SU2426456118; 51°18′13″N 1°39′12″W	1364551	Brunton House More images
Buildings 455 and 456 (five Aircraft Hangars), Durrington Camp	Larkhill, Durrington, Wiltshire	Aircraft Hangar	1910	1 December 2005	SU1430243583; 51°11′29″N 1°47′48″W	1391475	Buildings 455 and 456 (five Aircraft Hangars), Durrington Camp
Burderop Park	Chiseldon, Swindon	House	Early-Mid 17th century	21 January 1955	SU1667480133; 51°31′12″N 1°45′40″W	1023307	Burderop Park More images
Byne House	Warminster, Wiltshire	House	1755	28 April 1952	ST8690945257; 51°12′23″N 2°11′20″W	1286013	Byne House More images
Camellia House and Garden Walls, at Wardour Castle	Wardour Park, Tisbury, Wiltshire	House	1769	6 January 1966	ST9291027138; 51°02′37″N 2°06′09″W	1146006	Upload Photo
Cantax House and Front Garden Wall	Lacock, Wiltshire	House	1866	20 December 1960	ST9148668597; 51°24′59″N 2°07′26″W	1022139	Cantax House and Front Garden Wall More images
Catherine Wheel Public House	Salisbury, Wiltshire	House	16th century	12 October 1972	SU1467429952; 51°04′07″N 1°47′31″W	1259777	Catherine Wheel Public House
Chain Test House	Swindon	Chain Proving House	1873	18 May 1984	SU1433885048; 51°33′51″N 1°47′40″W	1355879	Upload Photo
Chalcot House	Chalcot Park, Dilton Marsh, Wiltshire	Country House	Late 17th century	11 September 1968	ST8429448824; 51°14′18″N 2°13′35″W	1021468	Upload Photo
Chancel End	Devizes, Wiltshire	House	1733	9 April 1954	SU0050861249; 51°21′01″N 1°59′39″W	1262363	Upload Photo
Chapel immediately north of Pythouse	Pythouse Park, West Tisbury, Wiltshire	Private Chapel	c. 1827	22 January 1990	ST9066228677; 51°03′26″N 2°08′05″W	1131162	Upload Photo
Chapel of St Mary	Chitterne, Wiltshire	Church	c. 1450	11 September 1968	ST9895743893; 51°11′39″N 2°00′59″W	1180966	Chapel of St Mary More images
Chapel to Somerset Hospital	Froxfield, Wiltshire	Chapel	1813	22 August 1966	SU3000268069; 51°24′39″N 1°34′12″W	1034077	Chapel to Somerset Hospital More images
Chapel to South East of Sheldon Manor	Sheldon Manor, Chippenham Without, Wiltshire	Chapel	15th century	20 December 1960	ST8867874143; 51°27′58″N 2°09′52″W	1022908	Chapel to South East of Sheldon Manor
Cheyney Court	Ditteridge, Wiltshire	House	Early to mid 17th century	20 December 1960	ST8163769410; 51°25′24″N 2°15′56″W	1285230	Upload Photo
Chicksgrove Manor	Lower Chicksgrove, Sutton Mandeville, Wiltshire	Cross Passage House	Late 14th century	6 January 1966	ST9703730022; 51°04′10″N 2°02′37″W	1146012	Chicksgrove Manor More images
Chinese Temple	Grounds of Amesbury Abbey, Amesbury	Chinese garden feature	1772	10 January 1953	SU1478241797; 51°10′31″N 1°47′24″W	1131080	Upload Photo
Chisenbury Priory	Enford, Wiltshire	House	Late 17th century	4 June 1952	SU1396952557; 51°16′19″N 1°48′04″W	1183864	Upload Photo
Cholderton House	Cholderton, Wiltshire	House	1690	10 January 1953	SU2266442625; 51°10′57″N 1°40′38″W	1023942	Upload Photo
Christ Church	Swindon	Anglican Church	1851	2 October 1951	SU1574483897; 51°33′13″N 1°46′28″W	1283770	Christ Church More images
Christ Church	Bradford-on-Avon, Wiltshire	Church	1843	18 April 1952	ST8275561357; 51°21′04″N 2°14′56″W	1036077	Christ Church More images
Christ Church	Shaw, Wiltshire	Anglican Church	1837	13 February 1985	ST8886365720; 51°23′25″N 2°09′41″W	1194686	Christ Church More images
Christ Church	Fosbury, Tidcombe and Fosbury, Wiltshire	Anglican Church	1856	10 July 1978	SU3142158609; 51°19′33″N 1°33′02″W	1365505	Christ Church More images
Church Cottage, Manse, Moravian Church	East Tytherton, Bremhill, Wiltshire	House	1792-4	20 December 1960	ST9655874966; 51°28′25″N 2°03′03″W	1363796	Church Cottage, Manse, Moravian Church More images
Church Farmhouse	Inglesham, Swindon	Farmhouse	19th century	20 September 1979	SU2047098433; 51°41′03″N 1°42′19″W	1023392	Upload Photo
Church House	Bradford-on-Avon, Wiltshire	House	18th century	18 April 1952	ST8253361002; 51°20′52″N 2°15′08″W	1200315	Church House More images
Church of All Saints	All Cannings, Wiltshire	Anglican Church	16th century	19 March 1962	SU0696861566; 51°21′11″N 1°54′05″W	1365955	Church of All Saints More images
Church of All Saints	Alton Priors, Alton, Wiltshire	Redundant Anglican Church	18th century	27 May 1964	SU1091962117; 51°21′29″N 1°50′40″W	1364710	Church of All Saints More images
Church of All Saints	Eastcourt, Burbage, Wiltshire	Anglican Church	1854	27 May 1964	SU2332461427; 51°21′05″N 1°39′59″W	1035909	Church of All Saints More images
Church of All Saints	Chitterne, Wiltshire	Anglican Church	1863	11 September 1968	ST9920644054; 51°11′45″N 2°00′46″W	1036441	Church of All Saints More images
Church of All Saints	Durrington, Wiltshire	Anglican Church	19th century	18 February 1958	SU1570144861; 51°12′10″N 1°46′36″W	1131017	Church of All Saints More images
Church of All Saints	Fittleton, Wiltshire	Anglican Church	1903	27 May 1964	SU1462449538; 51°14′41″N 1°47′31″W	1365539	Church of All Saints More images
Church of All Saints	Froxfield, Wiltshire	Church	1892	22 August 1966	SU2957768028; 51°24′38″N 1°34′34″W	1034080	Church of All Saints More images
Church of All Saints	Littleton Drew, Grittleton, Wiltshire	Anglican Church	1856	29 February 1988	ST8313980189; 51°31′13″N 2°14′40″W	1022294	Church of All Saints More images
Church of All Saints	Leigh, Wiltshire	Anglican Church	1896	17 January 1955	SU0624492159; 51°37′42″N 1°54′40″W	1356042	Church of All Saints More images
Church of All Saints	Lydiard Millicent, Wiltshire	Anglican Church	19th century	17 January 1955	SU0933886002; 51°34′22″N 1°52′00″W	1356045	Church of All Saints More images
Church of All Saints	Corston, Wiltshire	Anglican Church	1881	28 October 1959	ST9256383952; 51°33′16″N 2°06′31″W	1363872	Church of All Saints More images
Church of All Saints	Sutton Benger, Wiltshire	Anglican Church	1851	20 December 1960	ST9472078722; 51°30′27″N 2°04′39″W	1022403	Church of All Saints More images
Church of All Saints	Sutton Mandeville, Wiltshire	Anglican Church	1862	6 January 1966	ST9859528854; 51°03′32″N 2°01′17″W	1318693	Church of All Saints More images
Church of All Saints	Whiteparish, Wiltshire	Church	1870	23 March 1960	SU2461823594; 51°00′40″N 1°39′02″W	1300179	Church of All Saints More images
Church of All Saints	Winterslow, Wiltshire	Anglican Church	1866	23 March 1960	SU2290332511; 51°05′29″N 1°40′28″W	1299950	Church of All Saints More images
Church of Holy Trinity	Bowerchalke, Wiltshire	Anglican Church	16th century	23 March 1960	SU0187023006; 51°00′23″N 1°58′29″W	1198318	Church of Holy Trinity More images
Church of Holy Trinity	Dilton Marsh, Wiltshire	Anglican Church	1844	11 September 1968	ST8494949813; 51°14′50″N 2°13′01″W	1021473	Church of Holy Trinity More images
Church of Holy Trinity	Fonthill Gifford, Wiltshire	Church	1748	6 July 1987	ST9297131248; 51°04′50″N 2°06′06″W	1146055	Church of Holy Trinity More images
Church of St Aldheim	Bishopstrow, Wiltshire	Anglican Church	1757	17 August 1981	ST8951143764; 51°11′35″N 2°09′05″W	1284263	Church of St Aldheim More images
Church of St Andrew	Blunsdon St Andrew, Blunsdon, Swindon	Wall	Medieval	26 January 1955	SU1361289696; 51°36′21″N 1°48′17″W	1184208	Church of St Andrew More images
Church of St Andrew	Chippenham, Wiltshire	Parish Church	12th century	25 April 1950	ST9228173214; 51°27′28″N 2°06′45″W	1268018	Church of St Andrew More images
Church of St Andrew	Collingbourne Ducis, Wiltshire	Anglican Church	1856	27 May 1964	SU2421853667; 51°16′54″N 1°39′15″W	1035950	Church of St Andrew More images
Church of St Andrew	Donhead St Andrew, Wiltshire	Anglican Church	1826	6 January 1966	ST9145624839; 51°01′22″N 2°07′23″W	1146099	Church of St Andrew More images
Church of St Andrew	Etchilhampton, Wiltshire	Anglican Church	1866	19 March 1962	SU0457160256; 51°20′29″N 1°56′09″W	1193615	Church of St Andrew More images
Church of St Andrew	Heddington, Wiltshire	Church	16th century	20 December 1960	ST9992866205; 51°23′42″N 2°00′09″W	1261202	Church of St Andrew More images
Church of St Andrew	Landford, Wiltshire	Church	1858	23 March 1960	SU2614720165; 50°58′49″N 1°37′44″W	1184023	Church of St Andrew More images
Church of St Andrew	Nunton, Odstock, Wiltshire	Church	12th century	23 March 1960	SU1593226044; 51°02′01″N 1°46′27″W	1181836	Church of St Andrew More images
Church of St Andrew	Bemerton, Salisbury, Wiltshire	Church	Restored 1890	28 February 1952	SU1233730538; 51°04′27″N 1°49′31″W	1023696	Church of St Andrew More images
Church of St Andrew	Rollestone, Shrewton, Wiltshire	Church	1845	18 February 1952	SU0734943115; 51°11′14″N 1°53′46″W	1181917	Church of St Andrew More images
Church of St Andrew	Wootton Rivers, Wiltshire	Anglican Church	1861	27 May 1964	SU1967962948; 51°21′55″N 1°43′07″W	1193633	Church of St Andrew More images
Church of St Bartholomew and All Saints	Royal Wootton Bassett, Wiltshire	Church	C10-11	17 January 1955	SU0661282516; 51°32′29″N 1°54′22″W	1183969	Church of St Bartholomew and All Saints More images
Church of St Edith of Wilton	Dinton, Wiltshire	Anglican Church	1880-93 restored	23 March 1960	SU0287331585; 51°05′01″N 1°57′37″W	1283631	Church of St Edith of Wilton More images
Church of St Edward	Teffont, Wiltshire	Cross	Saxon	6 January 1966	ST9891632368; 51°05′26″N 2°01′01″W	1251111	Church of St Edward More images
Church of St George	Fovant, Wiltshire	Anglican Church	19th century	23 March 1960	ST9961929558; 51°03′55″N 2°00′25″W	1146126	Church of St George More images
Church of St George	Manton, Wiltshire	Church	12th century	18 July 1949	SU1798268574; 51°24′57″N 1°44′34″W	1243100	Church of St George More images
Church of St George	Ogbourne St George, Wiltshire	Anglican Church	19th century	27 February 1958	SU1955374692; 51°28′15″N 1°43′12″W	1284521	Church of St George More images
Church of St George	Orcheston St George, Orcheston, Wiltshire	Anglican Church	1833	4 July 1985	SU0598144894; 51°12′12″N 1°54′57″W	1024021	Church of St George More images
Church of St George	West Harnham, Salisbury, Wiltshire	Church	Norman	28 February 1952	SU1343229266; 51°03′45″N 1°48′35″W	1242798	Church of St George More images
Church of St Giles	Great Wishford, Great Wishford, Wiltshire	Anglican Church	1863-4	23 March 1960	SU0805535503; 51°07′08″N 1°53′11″W	1182616	Church of St Giles More images
Church of St Giles	Alderton, Wiltshire	Anglican Church	1844-5	28 October 1959	ST8418483054; 51°32′46″N 2°13′46″W	1022362	Church of St Giles More images
Church of St Giles	Upper Stanton, Stanton St Quintin, Wiltshire	Anglican Church	19th century	20 December 1960	ST9058079882; 51°31′04″N 2°08′14″W	1200437	Church of St Giles More images
Church of St Giles	Tockenham, Wiltshire	Church	13th century	17 January 1955	SU0400279332; 51°30′46″N 1°56′37″W	1200200	Church of St Giles More images
Church of St James	Bratton, Wiltshire	Church	15th century	11 September 1968	ST9141651930; 51°15′59″N 2°07′28″W	1036509	Church of St James More images
Church of St James	Cherhill, Wiltshire	Anglican Church	1863	20 December 1960	SU0384470286; 51°25′54″N 1°56′46″W	1022456	Church of St James More images
Church of St James	Devizes, Wiltshire	Church	15th century	9 April 1954	SU0108361517; 51°21′10″N 1°59′09″W	1263715	Church of St James More images
Church of St James	Tytherington Chapel, Heytesbury, Wiltshire	Anglican Church	16th century	11 September 1968	ST9164541143; 51°10′10″N 2°07′15″W	1036375	Church of St James More images
Church of St James	Marston Meysey, Wiltshire	Anglican Church	1874-6	17 April 1986	SU1275597197; 51°40′24″N 1°49′01″W	1023152	Church of St James More images
Church of St James	North Newnton, Wiltshire	Anglican Church	19th century	27 May 1964	SU1305757673; 51°19′05″N 1°48′51″W	1365549	Church of St James More images
Church of St James	South Wraxall, Wiltshire	Anglican Church	1832	13 November 1962	ST8326264782; 51°22′55″N 2°14′31″W	1021864	Church of St James More images
Church of St James	Draycot Cerne, Sutton Benger, Wiltshire	Church	1767	20 December 1960	ST9350678584; 51°30′22″N 2°05′42″W	1200500	Church of St James More images
Church of St John	West Grimstead, Grimstead, Wiltshire	Anglican Church	13th century to 18th century	23 March 1960	SU2113826596; 51°02′18″N 1°42′00″W	1284888	Church of St John More images
Church of St John	Bemerton, Salisbury, Wiltshire	Church	1860	28 February 1952	SU1207430603; 51°04′29″N 1°49′45″W	1374113	Church of St John More images
Church of St John Baptist	Brokenborough, Wiltshire	Church	1883	28 October 1959	ST9172689270; 51°36′08″N 2°07′15″W	1198567	Church of St John Baptist More images
Church of St John Baptist	Charlton, Wiltshire	Anglican Church	Mid 17th century	28 October 1959	ST9590588956; 51°35′58″N 2°03′38″W	1181631	Church of St John Baptist More images
Church of St John the Baptist	Hannington, Wiltshire	Parish Church	Late 12th century	26 January 1955	SU1816692794; 51°38′01″N 1°44′20″W	1023330	Church of St John the Baptist More images
Church of St John the Baptist	Foxham, Wiltshire	Anglican Church	1878-81	25 November 1987	ST9767577233; 51°29′39″N 2°02′06″W	1283495	Church of St John the Baptist More images
Church of St John the Baptist	Burcombe, Burcombe Without, Wiltshire	Church	1667	23 March 1960	SU0730431166; 51°04′47″N 1°53′50″W	1198542	Church of St John the Baptist More images
Church of St John the Baptist	Ebbesbourne Wake, Wiltshire	Anglican Church	17th century	23 March 1960	ST9915524175; 51°01′01″N 2°00′48″W	1318690	Church of St John the Baptist More images
Church of St John the Baptist	Horningsham, Wiltshire	Anglican Church	1844	11 September 1968	ST8206641414; 51°10′18″N 2°15′28″W	1364356	Church of St John the Baptist More images
Church of St John the Evangelist	Warminster, Wiltshire	Church	1872-74	31 March 1978	ST8848444601; 51°12′02″N 2°09′58″W	1193567	Church of St John the Evangelist More images
Church of St Katherine	Great Bedwyn, Wiltshire	Anglican Church	1861	22 August 1966	SU2519464913; 51°22′58″N 1°38′22″W	1183857	Church of St Katherine More images
Church of St Katherine	Holt, Wiltshire	Anglican Church	1891	13 November 1962	ST8606561603; 51°21′12″N 2°12′05″W	1021796	Church of St Katherine More images
Church of St Katherine	Sedgehill and Semley, Wiltshire	Anglican Church	17th century	6 January 1966	ST8664528255; 51°03′13″N 2°11′31″W	1198667	Church of St Katherine More images
Church of St Leonard	Broad Blunsdon, Blunsdon, Swindon	Church	Probably 13th century	26 January 1955	SU1529590753; 51°36′55″N 1°46′50″W	1023286	Church of St Leonard More images
Church of St Leonard	Berwick St Leonard, Wiltshire	Church	1860	6 January 1966	ST9237833142; 51°05′51″N 2°06′37″W	1318783	Church of St Leonard More images
Church of St Leonard	Keevil, Wiltshire	Church	15th century	11 September 1968	ST9176557982; 51°19′15″N 2°07′10″W	1262746	Church of St Leonard More images
Church of St Margaret	Leigh Delamere, Grittleton, Wiltshire	Anglican Church	1846	20 December 1960	ST8845379276; 51°30′44″N 2°10′04″W	1022289	Church of St Margaret More images
Church of St Margaret of Antioch	Chilmark, Wiltshire	Anglican Church	18th century	6 January 1966	ST9699032791; 51°05′40″N 2°02′40″W	1318662	Church of St Margaret of Antioch More images
Church of St Martin	Fifield Bavant, Ebbesborne Wake, Wiltshire	Anglican Church	17th century	27 July 1985	SU0182725084; 51°01′30″N 1°58′31″W	1250374	Church of St Martin More images
Church of St Martin	Zeals, Wiltshire	Anglican Church	1842-1846	6 January 1966	ST7807831774; 51°05′05″N 2°18′52″W	1131078	Church of St Martin More images
Church of St Mary	Alvediston, Wiltshire	Anglican Church	17th century	6 January 1966	ST9767823948; 51°00′54″N 2°02′04″W	1318670	Church of St Mary More images
Church of St Mary	Chilton Foliat, Wiltshire	Anglican Church	Early 17th century	22 August 1966	SU3191170550; 51°25′59″N 1°32′32″W	1034139	Church of St Mary More images
Church of St Mary	Chute Forest, Wiltshire	Parish Church	1875	8 May 1972	SU3089152060; 51°16′01″N 1°33′31″W	1364574	Church of St Mary More images
Church of St Mary	Codford, Wiltshire	Anglican Church	1863	11 September 1968	ST9749139768; 51°09′26″N 2°02′14″W	1285186	Church of St Mary More images
Church of St Mary	Collingbourne Kingston, Wiltshire	Anglican Church	1861	27 May 1964	SU2391355840; 51°18′04″N 1°39′30″W	1285324	Church of St Mary More images
Church of St Mary	Cricklade, Wiltshire	Church	1822	17 January 1955	SU1013493862; 51°38′36″N 1°51′18″W	1183154	Church of St Mary More images
Church of St Mary	Grittleton, Wiltshire	Anglican Church	1836-1837	20 December 1960	ST8601180019; 51°31′08″N 2°12′11″W	1198617	Church of St Mary More images
Church of St Mary	Whaddon, Hilperton, Wiltshire	Church	14th century	29 January 1988	ST8807361473; 51°21′08″N 2°10′22″W	1262296	Church of St Mary More images
Church of St Mary	Kilmington, Wiltshire	Anglican Church	1864	6 January 1966	ST7719736593; 51°07′41″N 2°19′38″W	1318459	Church of St Mary More images
Church of St Mary	Kingston Deverill, Wiltshire	Anglican Church	1846	11 September 1968	ST8458437062; 51°07′57″N 2°13′18″W	1364367	Church of St Mary More images
Church of St Mary	Limpley Stoke, Wiltshire	Anglican Church	19th century	13 November 1962	ST7836160343; 51°20′30″N 2°18′43″W	1364104	Church of St Mary More images
Church of St Mary	Milston, Wiltshire	Church	1786	18 February 1958	SU1621445205; 51°12′21″N 1°46′09″W	1183149	Church of St Mary More images
Church of St Mary	West Kington, Nettleton, Wiltshire	Anglican Church	1856	20 December 1960	ST8128877569; 51°29′48″N 2°16′15″W	1022974	Church of St Mary More images
Church of St Mary	Odstock, Wiltshire	Anglican Church	1870	23 March 1960	SU1515426102; 51°02′03″N 1°47′07″W	1023844	Church of St Mary More images
Church of St Mary	Orcheston St Mary, Orcheston, Wiltshire	Anglican Church	1833	4 July 1985	SU0589345646; 51°12′36″N 1°55′01″W	1181876	Church of St Mary More images
Church of St Mary	Shrewton, Wiltshire	Anglican Church	1603	18 February 1958	SU0670843773; 51°11′35″N 1°54′19″W	1023959	Church of St Mary More images
Church of St Mary	Sopworth, Wiltshire	Anglican Church	1871	28 October 1959	ST8279086280; 51°34′30″N 2°14′59″W	1283124	Church of St Mary More images
Church of St Mary	Wilton, Wiltshire	Anglican Church	Medieval	4 August 1951	SU0970631239; 51°04′49″N 1°51′46″W	1355781	Church of St Mary More images
Church of St Mary	Wingfield, Wiltshire	Anglican Church	18th century	13 November 1962	ST8263156774; 51°18′35″N 2°15′02″W	1285304	Church of St Mary More images
Church of St Mary	Wylye, Wiltshire	Anglican Church	1846	23 March 1960	SU0080737732; 51°08′20″N 1°59′23″W	1146203	Church of St Mary More images
Church of St Mary the Virgin	Homington Village, Coombe Bissett, Wiltshire	Anglican Church	Early 17th century	23 March 1960	SU1226325995; 51°01′59″N 1°49′35″W	1023807	Church of St Mary the Virgin More images
Church of St Mary the Virgin	Shrewton, Shrewton, Wiltshire	Anglican Church	1855	18 February 1958	SU0698844339; 51°11′54″N 1°54′05″W	1023996	Church of St Mary the Virgin More images
Church of St Mary the Virgin	Upton Scudamore Village, Upton Scudamore, Wiltshire	Anglican Church	18th century	11 September 1968	ST8647247674; 51°13′41″N 2°11′42″W	1181692	Church of St Mary the Virgin More images
Church of St Mary the Virgin	West Knoyle, Wiltshire	Anglican Church	1767	6 January 1966	ST8596432684; 51°05′36″N 2°12′06″W	1199597	Church of St Mary the Virgin More images
Church of St Matthew	Rowde, Wiltshire	Anglican Church	1832-3	19 March 1962	ST9779862648; 51°21′46″N 2°01′59″W	1272866	Church of St Matthew More images
Church of St Matthew	Rushall, Wiltshire	Anglican Church	1812	27 May 1964	SU1286655852; 51°18′06″N 1°49′01″W	1365552	Church of St Matthew More images
Church of St Michael	Compton Chamberlayne Village, Compton Chamberlayne, Wiltshire	Anglican Church	19th century	23 March 1960	SU0291030076; 51°04′12″N 1°57′35″W	1198624	Church of St Michael More images
Church of St Michael	Kington St Michael Village, Kington St. Michael, Wiltshire	Parish Church	12th century	20 December 1960	ST9038377196; 51°29′37″N 2°08′24″W	1283509	Church of St Michael More images
Church of St Michael	Melksham, Wiltshire	Church	Medieval	29 September 1950	ST9028863732; 51°22′21″N 2°08′27″W	1021707	Church of St Michael More images
Church of St Michael	Tidcombe, Tidcombe and Fosbury, Wiltshire	Tower	17th century	22 August 1966	SU2900558252; 51°19′21″N 1°35′07″W	1299891	Church of St Michael More images
Church of St Michael	West Overton, Wiltshire	Anglican Church	1877-8	27 February 1958	SU1338268135; 51°24′43″N 1°48′32″W	1033801	Church of St Michael More images
Church of St Michael	Wilsford, Wilsford cum Lake, Wiltshire	Anglican Church	1852	18 February 1958	SU1347839802; 51°09′26″N 1°48′31″W	1284143	Church of St Michael More images
Church of St Michael and All Angels	Atworth, Wiltshire	Church	1832	13 November 1962	ST8588865780; 51°23′27″N 2°12′15″W	1250853	Church of St Michael and All Angels More images
Church of St Michael and All Angels	Figheldean, Figheldean, Wiltshire	Anglican Church	1679	18 February 1958	SU1527447491; 51°13′35″N 1°46′58″W	1131027	Church of St Michael and All Angels More images
Church of St Michael and All Angels	Shalbourne, Wiltshire	Anglican Church	1871-73	22 August 1966	SU3157063511; 51°22′11″N 1°32′52″W	1184401	Church of St Michael and All Angels More images
Church of St Michael and All Angels	Teffont Evias, Teffont, Wiltshire	Anglican Church	16th century	6 January 1966	ST9915131186; 51°04′48″N 2°00′49″W	1146266	Church of St Michael and All Angels More images
Church of St Michael the Archangel	Brixton Deverill Village, Brixton Deverill, Wiltshire	Anglican Church	1730	11 September 1968	ST8639538710; 51°08′51″N 2°11′45″W	1364380	Church of St Michael the Archangel More images
Church of St Nicholas	Baydon, Wiltshire	Wall	19th century	22 August 1966	SU2813378068; 51°30′03″N 1°35′46″W	1034135	Church of St Nicholas More images
Church of St Nicholas	Berwick Bassett, Wiltshire	Parish Church	15th century	27 February 1958	SU0985573546; 51°27′39″N 1°51′34″W	1365565	Church of St Nicholas More images
Church of St Nicholas	Slaughterford, Biddestone, Wiltshire	Anglican Church	1823	20 December 1960	ST8395873994; 51°27′53″N 2°13′56″W	1363574	Church of St Nicholas More images
Church of St Nicholas	Tytherton Lucas, Bremhill, Wiltshire	Anglican Church	1802	25 November 1987	ST9466474288; 51°28′03″N 2°04′42″W	1022442	Church of St Nicholas More images
Church of St Nicholas	Chippenham, Wiltshire	Parish Church	c. 1779	22 June 1978	ST9096674748; 51°28′18″N 2°07′53″W	1268098	Church of St Nicholas More images
Church of St Nicholas	Cholderton, Wiltshire	Warehouse	1841-50	18 February 1958	SU2270642488; 51°10′52″N 1°40′36″W	1023940	Church of St Nicholas More images
Church of St Nicholas	Fyfield, Wiltshire	Anglican Church	Mid 19th century	27 February 1958	SU1484368693; 51°25′01″N 1°47′17″W	1182200	Church of St Nicholas More images
Church of St Nicholas	East Grafton, Grafton, Wiltshire	Anglican Church	1844	30 July 1986	SU2574460325; 51°20′29″N 1°37′54″W	1365521	Church of St Nicholas More images
Church of St Nicholas	North Bradley, Wiltshire	Church	1777	11 September 1968	ST8546054903; 51°17′35″N 2°12′36″W	1181520	Church of St Nicholas More images
Church of St Nicholas	Wilsford, Wiltshire	Anglican Church	1864	27 May 1964	SU1022457225; 51°18′51″N 1°51′17″W	1320070	Church of St Nicholas More images
Church of St Nicholas	Fisherton Delamere, Wylye, Wiltshire	Church	19th century	23 March 1960	SU0009338524; 51°08′46″N 2°00′00″W	1183381	Church of St Nicholas More images
Church of St Nicholas of Mira	Little Langford, Steeple Langford, Wiltshire	Church	C20	23 March 1960	SU0478336620; 51°07′44″N 1°55′59″W	1284230	Church of St Nicholas of Mira More images
Church of St Paul and attached Walls, Gates and Piers	Chippenham, Wiltshire	Gate	1853-1861	22 June 1978	ST9192173990; 51°27′53″N 2°07′04″W	1268096	Church of St Paul and attached Walls, Gates and Piers More images
Church of St Peter	Blackland, Calne Without, Wiltshire	Church	19th century	20 December 1960	SU0125369426; 51°25′26″N 1°59′00″W	1261936	Church of St Peter More images
Church of St Peter	Charlton St. Peter, Charlton, Wiltshire	Anglican Church	19th century	27 May 1964	SU1172356057; 51°18′13″N 1°50′00″W	1365532	Church of St Peter More images
Church of St Peter	Codford St Peter, Codford, Wiltshire	Cross	C9	11 September 1968	ST9658039933; 51°09′31″N 2°03′01″W	1036461	Church of St Peter More images
Church of St Peter	Everleigh, Wiltshire	Anglican Church	1813	27 May 1964	SU1982654160; 51°17′10″N 1°43′02″W	1035994	Church of St Peter More images
Church of St Peter	Milton Lilbourne, Wiltshire	Anglican Church	1875	27 May 1964	SU1899060444; 51°20′34″N 1°43′44″W	1364687	Church of St Peter More images
Church of St Peter	Monkton Farleigh Village, Monkton Farleigh, Wiltshire	Sunday School	1829	13 November 1962	ST8061365269; 51°23′10″N 2°16′48″W	1285556	Church of St Peter More images
Church of St Peter	Pitton, Pitton and Farley, Wiltshire	Anglican Church	1878-1880	23 March 1960	SU2125331569; 51°04′59″N 1°41′53″W	1135702	Church of St Peter More images
Church of St Peter	Townsend, Poulshot, Wiltshire	Anglican Church	19th century	19 March 1962	ST9642058812; 51°19′42″N 2°03′10″W	1272991	Church of St Peter More images
Church of St Peter	Swallowcliffe, Wiltshire	Anglican Church	1842-43	6 January 1966	ST9636827115; 51°02′36″N 2°03′11″W	1263108	Church of St Peter More images
Church of St Peter	Fugglestone, Wilton, Wiltshire	Church	13th century	4 August 1951	SU1022231364; 51°04′53″N 1°51′20″W	1365906	Church of St Peter More images
Church of St Peter	Winterbourne Stoke, Winterbourne Stoke, Wiltshire	Anglican Church	Early 19th century	10 February 1988	SU0768840651; 51°09′54″N 1°53′29″W	1130975	Church of St Peter More images
Church of St Peter Ad Vincula	Tollard Royal Village, Tollard Royal, Wiltshire	Anglican Church	1882	6 January 1966	ST9440517717; 50°57′32″N 2°04′52″W	1146278	Church of St Peter Ad Vincula More images
Church of St Peter and St Paul	Longbridge Deverill, Wiltshire	Anglican Church	19th century	11 September 1968	ST8664341369; 51°10′17″N 2°11′33″W	1200661	Church of St Peter and St Paul More images
Church of St Peter and St Paul	Centre Island, Marlborough, Wiltshire	Former Church/Art centre	Mid or late 15th century	18 July 1949	SU1857968793; 51°25′04″N 1°44′03″W	1034258	Church of St Peter and St Paul More images
Church of the Holy Cross	Hankerton, Wiltshire	Parish Church	Late 12th century	28 October 1959	ST9725090759; 51°36′56″N 2°02′28″W	1022241	Church of the Holy Cross More images
Church of the Holy Cross	Wilcot, Wiltshire	Anglican Church	1718	27 May 1964	SU1400560792; 51°20′46″N 1°48′01″W	1364663	Church of the Holy Cross More images
Church of the Holy Rood	Rodbourne, St. Paul Malmesbury Without, Wiltshire	Anglican Church	1849	28 October 1959	ST9340283393; 51°32′58″N 2°05′48″W	1363874	Church of the Holy Rood More images
Church of the Holy Trinity	Easton Royal, Easton, Wiltshire	Anglican Church	1591	13 June 1988	SU2069760398; 51°20′32″N 1°42′15″W	1364554	Church of the Holy Trinity More images
Church of the Holy Trinity	Tidworth, Wiltshire	Anglican Church	Late 14th century	13 June 1988	SU2344749017; 51°14′23″N 1°39′56″W	1036009	Church of the Holy Trinity More images
Church of the Holy Trinity	Trowbridge, Wiltshire	Church	1837	26 November 1976	ST8513457769; 51°19′08″N 2°12′53″W	1283596	Church of the Holy Trinity More images
Churchyard Cross	Inglesham, Inglesham, Swindon	Cross	15th century	20 September 1979	SU2053298419; 51°41′03″N 1°42′16″W	1355932	Churchyard Cross More images
Churchyard Cross	Great Bedwyn, Wiltshire	Church	18th century	22 August 1966	SU2773064288; 51°22′37″N 1°36′11″W	1034045	Churchyard Cross More images
Clatford Hall	Clatford, Preshute, Wiltshire	House	Early and mid 19th century	27 February 1958	SU1565068600; 51°24′58″N 1°46′35″W	1284448	Clatford Hall
Close Gate	Salisbury, Wiltshire	House	Mid 18th century	28 February 1952	SU1429729774; 51°04′02″N 1°47′50″W	1260032	Upload Photo
Clouds House	Milton, East Knoyle, Wiltshire	Country House	1881-1891	6 January 1966	ST8763531004; 51°04′42″N 2°10′40″W	1131142	Clouds House More images
Cole Park	Cole Park, St Paul Malmesbury Without, Wiltshire	Country House	1951	12 December 1951	ST9404985261; 51°33′58″N 2°05′14″W	1022270	Cole Park More images
Coles Farmhouse	Alcombe, Box, Wiltshire	House	1648	20 December 1960	ST8111369201; 51°25′17″N 2°16′23″W	1022715	Upload Photo
College Farmhouse	Purton, Wiltshire	Farmhouse	Early 17th century	17 January 1955	SU0910387622; 51°35′15″N 1°52′12″W	1198361	Upload Photo
College of Sarum St Michael the Old Deanery	Salisbury, Wiltshire	Deanery	13th century	12 October 1972	SU1409829557; 51°03′55″N 1°48′01″W	1254416	College of Sarum St Michael the Old Deanery More images
Columns to South East and South West of Orangery	Wilton House, Wilton, Wiltshire	Column	17th century	8 June 1978	SU0978831004; 51°04′42″N 1°51′42″W	1023767	Upload Photo
Conholt Park	Chute, Wiltshire	House	17th century	4 June 1952	SU3244355004; 51°17′36″N 1°32′10″W	1035931	Upload Photo
Conock Manor	Conock, Chirton, Wiltshire	Manor House	c. 1700	19 March 1962	SU0683057412; 51°18′57″N 1°54′12″W	1182202	Upload Photo
Conservative Club	Devizes, Wiltshire	House	Mid 18th century	9 April 1954	SU0064061112; 51°20′57″N 1°59′32″W	1263548	Conservative Club More images
Converted Coach House to North East, Wren House	Warminster, Wiltshire	House	circa 1720 or 1730	28 April 1952	ST8674445087; 51°12′17″N 2°11′28″W	1036254	Upload Photo
Council House	Salisbury, Wiltshire	House	16th century	28 February 1952	SU1473630355; 51°04′20″N 1°47′28″W	1023544	Council House More images
Court House	Sherston, Wiltshire	House	1951	12 December 1951	ST8522785960; 51°34′20″N 2°12′52″W	1023232	Upload Photo
Court House at Manor House	Great Cheverell, Wiltshire	Game Larder	c. 1690	19 March 1962	ST9802054284; 51°17′16″N 2°01′47″W	1035788	Upload Photo
Courtfield House (Roundstone Preparatory School)	Trowbridge, Wiltshire	House/School	c. 1754	29 December 1950	ST8597557832; 51°19′10″N 2°12′09″W	1021635	Courtfield House (Roundstone Preparatory School) More images
Craddock House, Friars Cottage, Friary Cottage, Friary Court	Salisbury, Wiltshire	House	1600	28 February 1952	SU1464729590; 51°03′56″N 1°47′32″W	1355799	Craddock House, Friars Cottage, Friary Cottage, Friary Court More images
Craven House and Wrought Iron Screen to Street	Warminster, Wiltshire	House	17th century and early 18th century	28 April 1952	ST8696945108; 51°12′18″N 2°11′16″W	1036246	Craven House and Wrought Iron Screen to Street More images
Cross Hayes House and attached Wall, Railings and Gate Posts	Malmesbury, Wiltshire	House	1728	18 January 1949	ST9341687123; 51°34′59″N 2°05′47″W	1269514	Cross Hayes House and attached Wall, Railings and Gate Posts More images
Crown and Anchor Inn	Salisbury, Wiltshire	Timber Framed House	16th century	28 February 1952	SU1454729419; 51°03′50″N 1°47′38″W	1023660	Upload Photo
Crowood House	Ramsbury, Wiltshire	Country House	Late 17th century	27 August 1966	SU2811673017; 51°27′20″N 1°35′48″W	1365471	Upload Photo
Culver House	Malmesbury, Wiltshire	House	C16-C16	18 January 1949	ST9347686995; 51°34′54″N 2°05′44″W	1269487	Upload Photo
Dairy Bridge	Wilton Park, Wilton, Wiltshire	Grille	1822	8 June 1978	SU1063130786; 51°04′35″N 1°50′59″W	1355749	Upload Photo
Daubenys	Colerne, Wiltshire	Farmhouse	c. 1400	20 December 1960	ST8175571066; 51°26′18″N 2°15′50″W	1363531	Upload Photo
Dauntsey House	Dauntsey, Wiltshire	Country House	14th century	12 December 1951	ST9796982514; 51°32′29″N 2°01′50″W	1199975	Dauntsey House More images
David Ricardo Monument in Churchyard of Church of St Nicholas	Chippenham, Wiltshire	Commemorative Monument	1823	22 June 1978	ST9097974758; 51°28′18″N 2°07′53″W	1268099	David Ricardo Monument in Churchyard of Church of St Nicholas More images
De Vaux House	Salisbury, Wiltshire	House	C17-C18	28 February 1952	SU1436029213; 51°03′43″N 1°47′47″W	1259073	De Vaux House More images
Dean House (including West Wing, which is in Wiltshire)	West Dean, Wiltshire	House	1986	29 May 1957	SU2575427279; 51°02′39″N 1°38′02″W	1093674	Upload Photo
Dewes House	Mere, Wiltshire	House	mid-late 17th century	6 January 1966	ST8139632401; 51°05′26″N 2°16′01″W	1200209	Upload Photo
Dial House	West Lavington, Wiltshire	House	1691	19 March 1962	SU0077052874; 51°16′30″N 1°59′25″W	1035898	Dial House More images
Diana's House	Amesbury, Wiltshire	Gatehouse	1600	10 January 1953	SU1534641854; 51°10′33″N 1°46′55″W	1131053	Diana's House More images
Diocesan Registry	Salisbury, Wiltshire	Register Office	Earlier	28 February 1952	SU1442329579; 51°03′55″N 1°47′44″W	1355832	Diocesan Registry More images
Donhead Hall with attached Walls and Terraces	Donhead St Mary, Wiltshire	Country House	Early 18th century	6 January 1966	ST9047423764; 51°00′47″N 2°08′14″W	1146082	Upload Photo
Dovecote at Avebury Manor	Avebury, Wiltshire	Dovecote	Mid 16th century	22 August 1966	SU0998470001; 51°25′44″N 1°51′28″W	1286437	Dovecote at Avebury Manor More images
Dovecote at Easton House	Easton, Corsham, Wiltshire	Dovecote	Circa late 17th century or early 18th century	20 December 1960	ST8895470432; 51°25′58″N 2°09′37″W	1022020	Upload Photo
Dovecote at Faulston House	Bishopstone, Wiltshire	Dovecote	Early 17th century	23 March 1960	SU0728925631; 51°01′48″N 1°53′51″W	1146160	Dovecote at Faulston House More images
Dove's House	Ham, Wiltshire	House	Late C16-Early 17th century	30 July 1986	SU3305963098; 51°21′58″N 1°31′35″W	1184229	Dove's House More images
Drewett's Mill	Box, Wiltshire	Corn Mill	Mid 18th century	20 December 1960	ST8323569874; 51°25′39″N 2°14′33″W	1181097	Upload Photo
Druce's Hill House	Bradford-on-Avon, Wiltshire	House	early to mid 19th century	18 April 1952	ST8248960992; 51°20′52″N 2°15′10″W	1200313	Druce's Hill House More images
East Gate and Lodges to Ramsbury Manor	Ramsbury, Wiltshire	Gate Lodge	c. 1680	22 August 1966	SU2633271245; 51°26′23″N 1°37′21″W	1365500	East Gate and Lodges to Ramsbury Manor More images
East Portal of Middlehill Tunnel	Middlehill, Box, Wiltshire	Tunnel	1840	24 July 1985	ST8211768759; 51°25′03″N 2°15′31″W	1022802	Upload Photo
Eastcott Manor	Easterton, Wiltshire	Farmhouse	c. 1600	19 March 1962	SU0236255603; 51°17′58″N 1°58′03″W	1284568	Upload Photo
Eastcourt House	Eastcourt, Crudwell, Wiltshire	Country House	1658	12 December 1951	ST9796191906; 51°37′33″N 2°01′51″W	1363892	Upload Photo
Easton House	Easton, Corsham, Wiltshire	House	16th century	20 December 1960	ST8900070440; 51°25′58″N 2°09′35″W	1022018	Upload Photo
Edgar House	Westbury, Wiltshire	House	Early 18th century	29 December 1950	ST8732951198; 51°15′35″N 2°10′59″W	1180474	Upload Photo
Fieldways, Highfield	Trowbridge, Wiltshire	House	c. 1858	26 November 1976	ST8681558739; 51°19′39″N 2°11′26″W	1197993	Upload Photo
Fisherton Mill	Salisbury, Wiltshire	House	Late 18th century	28 February 1952	SU1374429918; 51°04′06″N 1°48′19″W	1258197	Fisherton Mill More images
Flue to Crofton Pumping Station	Crofton, Great Bedwyn, Wiltshire	Pumping Station	1802-09	30 July 1986	SU2613962278; 51°21′32″N 1°37′34″W	1300317	Flue to Crofton Pumping Station
Forecourt and Railings of Manor House	Bradford-on-Avon, Wiltshire	House	17th century	18 April 1952	ST8277761102; 51°20′55″N 2°14′55″W	1036145	Upload Photo
Former Church of St Edmund	Salisbury	Arts Centre	c.1407; adapted 1975, extended 2003–2005	28 February 1952	SU1468530344; 51°04′20″N 1°47′30″W	1355852	Former Church of St Edmund More images
Former Hangar at north-east corner of former Airfield	RAF Yatesbury, Cherhill, Wiltshire	Aircraft Hangar	1916	25 November 1987	SU0569771428; 51°26′31″N 1°55′10″W	1363784	Upload Photo
Former Methodist Chapel to rear of No 29, Town Club	Bradford-on-Avon, Wiltshire	House	18th century	23 August 1974	ST8259961042; 51°20′53″N 2°15′04″W	1036071	Former Methodist Chapel to rear of No 29, Town Club More images
Former School and School House	Sevington, Grittleton, Wiltshire	School and Schoolhouse	1848	29 February 1988	ST8711678814; 51°30′29″N 2°11′13″W	1022297	Former School and School House More images
Swan Hotel	Bradford-on-Avon, Wiltshire	Hotel	18th century	18 April 1952	ST8261260986; 51°20′52″N 2°15′04″W	1200184	Swan Hotel More images
Former Stable Block, now Garage of No 56a and 56b	Salisbury, Wiltshire	Garage	1972	12 October 1972	SU1419029758; 51°04′01″N 1°47′56″W	1023619	Upload Photo
Former Wesleyan Methodist Church	Bradford-on-Avon, Wiltshire	Steps	1818	18 April 1952	ST8267361129; 51°20′56″N 2°15′01″W	1036046	Former Wesleyan Methodist Church More images
Front Gateway to Idmiston Manor and abutting Walls	Idmiston, Wiltshire	Gate	C16-C17	29 May 1987	SU1980137347; 51°08′06″N 1°43′06″W	1183901	Front Gateway to Idmiston Manor and abutting Walls More images
Frowds Almshouses	Salisbury, Wiltshire	Almshouse	1750	28 February 1952	SU1458030259; 51°04′17″N 1°47′36″W	1023534	Frowds Almshouses More images
Garden Folly in Tottenham House Deerpark	Great Bedwyn, Wiltshire	Game Larder	1720-1730	22 August 1966	SU2448663381; 51°22′08″N 1°38′59″W	1300392	Garden Folly in Tottenham House Deerpark More images
Garden Ornament near South West Corner of House	Little Durnford, Durnford, Wiltshire	Vase	1780-90	10 October 1988	SU1246734226; 51°06′26″N 1°49′24″W	1182955	Upload Photo
Garden Pavilion to the South East of Hillworth House	Devizes, Wiltshire	Pavilion	Early 18th century	9 April 1954	SU0046160913; 51°20′50″N 1°59′41″W	1249833	Upload Photo
Garsdon Manor	Garsdon, Lea and Cleverton, Wiltshire	Manor House	Early 17th century	12 December 1951	ST9634587653; 51°35′16″N 2°03′15″W	1022252	Upload Photo
Gaston Manor	Tisbury, Wiltshire	Detached House	Late 14th century	6 January 1966	ST9444029492; 51°03′53″N 2°04′51″W	1318826	Gaston Manor
Gate Piers and Gates to Amesbury Abbey, with Flanking Walls	Amesbury, Wiltshire	Gate	C20	10 October 1988	SU1517741374; 51°10′17″N 1°47′03″W	1131088	Gate Piers and Gates to Amesbury Abbey, with Flanking Walls More images
Gate Piers to Lord's Walk, to Amesbury Abbey, with Flanking Estate Boundary Walls	Amesbury, Wiltshire	Gate	Mid 17th century	10 January 1953	SU1539341742; 51°10′29″N 1°46′52″W	1182498	Upload Photo
Gatehouse and Bridge over Moat at Southwick Court Farmhouse	Southwick Court, Southwick, Wiltshire	Moat	18th century	11 September 1968	ST8450755824; 51°18′05″N 2°13′25″W	1021848	Gatehouse and Bridge over Moat at Southwick Court Farmhouse
Gatepiers at North East Entrance to Corsham Park	Corsham Court, Corsham, Wiltshire	Gate Pier	Early 18th century	20 December 1960	ST8905971591; 51°26′36″N 2°09′32″W	1181798	Gatepiers at North East Entrance to Corsham Park
Gay's Cave and Diamond	Amesbury Abbey, Wiltshire	Garden feature	Late 18th century	10 January 1953	SU1473741692; 51°10′27″N 1°47′26″W	1131081	Upload Photo
Gazebo to Rear of No 36 (parkside)	Corsham, Wiltshire	Gazebo	Early 18th century	20 December 1960	ST8726070356; 51°25′55″N 2°11′05″W	1182957	Upload Photo
George and Dragon Public House	Salisbury, Wiltshire	House	Early 19th century	28 February 1952	SU1436230340; 51°04′20″N 1°47′47″W	1355860	George and Dragon Public House More images
Gifford Hall	The Common (north side), Broughton Gifford, Wiltshire	House	17th century	13 November 1962	ST8745564422; 51°22′43″N 2°10′54″W	1262897	Gifford Hall More images
Granary at the Manor House	Steeple Ashton, Wiltshire	Granary	Late 17th century	11 September 1968	ST9071657161; 51°18′49″N 2°08′05″W	1252494	Upload Photo
Great Barn to the South West of Brokenborough Farmhouse	Brokenborough, Wiltshire	Barn	Medieval	12 December 1951	ST9174488963; 51°35′58″N 2°07′14″W	1283777	Upload Photo
Great Porch House	Devizes, Wiltshire	House	19th century	9 April 1954	SU0062161523; 51°21′10″N 1°59′33″W	1250885	Great Porch House More images
Greenhill House, Westhill	Westwood, Wiltshire	House	17th century	13 November 1962	ST8049259590; 51°20′06″N 2°16′53″W	1021886	Upload Photo

== See also ==
- Grade I listed buildings in Wiltshire
- Grade II* listed buildings in Wiltshire
