= Listed buildings in Avebury (village) =

Buildings in Avebury, Wiltshire, England

Avebury is a village and civil parish in Wiltshire, England. It contains 76 listed buildings that are recorded in the National Heritage List for England. Of these three are grade I, one is grade II* and 72 are grade II.

This list is based on the information retrieved online from Historic England.

== Key ==
Grade	Criteria
I	Buildings that are of exceptional interest
II*	Particularly important buildings of more than special interest
II	Buildings that are of special interest

== Listing ==
Name	Grade	Location	Type	Completed (Note: The date given is the date used by Historic England as significant for the initial building or that of an important part in the structure's description.)	Date designated	Grid ref. (Note: The grid reference is based on the British national grid reference system, sometimes known as OSGB36, used by the Ordnance Survey.) Geo-coordinates	Notes	Entry number (Note: The "List Entry Number" is a unique number assigned to each listed building and scheduled monument by Historic England.)	Image	Wikidata
Avebury Manor	I	Avebury Manor			27 February 1958	SU0988969997; 51°25′44″N 1°51′33″W		1033785	Avebury Manor More images	Q662918
North Wall of West Garden of Avebury Manor	II	Avebury Manor			29 April 1987	SU0982370007; 51°25′44″N 1°51′36″W		1033788	North Wall of West Garden of Avebury Manor More images	Q26285286
Racquets Court	II	Avebury Manor			29 April 1987	SU0979670031; 51°25′45″N 1°51′38″W		1033789	Racquets Court More images	Q26285287
Garden Gate East of Avebury Manor	II	Avebury Manor			29 April 1987	SU0994769997; 51°25′44″N 1°51′30″W		1192783	Garden Gate East of Avebury Manor More images	Q26487456
Gatepiers and Gates on North Side of East Garden	II	Avebury Manor			29 April 1987	SU0990670021; 51°25′45″N 1°51′32″W		1192798	Upload Photo	Q26487470
West Wall of South Garden of Avebury Manor	II	Avebury Manor			29 April 1987	SU0986769958; 51°25′43″N 1°51′34″W		1192822	West Wall of South Garden of Avebury Manor More images	Q26487492
Garden Figure at South End of West Walk	II	Avebury Manor			29 April 1987	SU0980469908; 51°25′41″N 1°51′37″W		1192841	Upload Photo	Q26487510
Wall and Gates South of Avebury Manor	II	Avebury Manor			29 April 1987	SU0989969933; 51°25′42″N 1°51′32″W		1365923	Upload Photo	Q26647563
North Screen to Topiary Garden	II	Avebury Manor			29 April 1987	SU0985870022; 51°25′45″N 1°51′35″W		1365924	North Screen to Topiary Garden More images	Q26647564
Dovecote at Avebury Manor	II*	Avebury Manor			22 August 1966	SU0998570001; 51°25′44″N 1°51′28″W		1286437	Dovecote at Avebury Manor More images	Q17643390
Walls to Rose Garden, South East Of Avebury Manor	II	Avebury Manor			29 April 1987	SU0993569962; 51°25′43″N 1°51′31″W		1192810	Upload Photo	Q26487483
Brow Cottage	II	Avebury Trusloe			29 April 1987	SU0950469456; 51°25′27″N 1°51′53″W		1192935	Upload Photo	Q26487605
Stables with Chapel Corner Cottages	II	Avebury Trusloe			29 April 1987	SU0953469609; 51°25′31″N 1°51′51″W		1365945	Upload Photo	Q26647585
Chapel Corner Cottages	II	1, Avebury Trusloe			21 February 1979	SU0957869624; 51°25′32″N 1°51′49″W		1033756	Upload Photo	Q26285251
Milestone Approximately 0.75 Miles West of the Beckhampton Roundabout	II	A4, Beckhampton			29 April 1987	SU0772969216; 51°25′19″N 1°53′25″W		1033750	Milestone Approximately 0.75 Miles West of the Beckhampton Roundabout More images	Q26285243
Waggon and Horses Public House	II	A4, Beckhampton			29 April 1987	SU0905068904; 51°25′09″N 1°52′16″W		1033751	Upload Photo	Q26285244
Gates at Beckhampton House	II	Beckhampton			29 April 1987	SU0875268947; 51°25′10″N 1°52′32″W		1033759	Upload Photo	Q26285254
Milestone Approximately 580 Metres South of Beckhampton Roundabout	II	A361, Beckhampton			29 April 1987	SU0831368748; 51°25′04″N 1°52′55″W		1033791	Upload Photo	Q26285289
Milestone Approximately 460 Metres North of Beckhampton Roundabout	II	A361, Beckhampton			29 April 1987	SU0920169133; 51°25′16″N 1°52′09″W		1192891	Upload Photo	Q26487560
Galtee More Farmhouse	II	Beckhampton			29 April 1987	SU0902468730; 51°25′03″N 1°52′18″W		1192954	Upload Photo	Q26487623
Beckhampton House	II	Beckhampton			29 April 1987	SU0875268938; 51°25′10″N 1°52′32″W		1286385	Upload Photo	Q26574987
Milestone Approximately 480 Metres East of Beckhampton Roundabout	II	A4, Beckhampton			29 April 1987	SU0924468754; 51°25′04″N 1°52′06″W		1286399	Upload Photo	Q26575000
Butlers Cottage	II	Beckhampton			29 April 1987	SU0876868794; 51°25′05″N 1°52′31″W		1365947	Upload Photo	Q26647587
Westbrook Farmhouse	II	Bray Street, Avebury Trusloe			22 August 1966	SU0931869887; 51°25′40″N 1°52′03″W		1033757	Upload Photo	Q26285252
Trusloe Manor	II	Bray Street, Avebury Trusloe			22 August 1966	SU0962969858; 51°25′40″N 1°51′46″W		1033758	Upload Photo	Q26285253
Little Acre	II	Bray Street, Avebury Trusloe			29 April 1987	SU0938569906; 51°25′41″N 1°51′59″W		1192939	Upload Photo	Q26487609
Banning's Farmhouse	II	Bray Street, Avebury Trusloe			22 August 1966	SU0953469926; 51°25′42″N 1°51′51″W		1365946	Upload Photo	Q26647586
Walls and Gates and Gatepiers to Stable Yard	II	East Of Alexander Keiller Museum			22 August 1966	SU0996470003; 51°25′44″N 1°51′29″W		1033786	Upload Photo	Q26285283
Trusloe Farm Cottages	II	1 and 2, Frog Lane, Avebury Trusloe			22 August 1966	SU0956969528; 51°25′29″N 1°51′50″W		1192963	Upload Photo	Q26487632
Silbury House	II	Green Street			29 April 1987	SU1024369977; 51°25′43″N 1°51′15″W		1033760	Silbury House More images	Q26285255
Perry's Cottage	II	Green Street			29 April 1987	SU1023869944; 51°25′42″N 1°51′15″W		1033761	Perry's Cottage More images	Q26285256
United Reformed Chapel	II	Green Street			2 November 1977	SU1025869935; 51°25′42″N 1°51′14″W		1192973	Upload Photo	Q26487641
Carpenter's Cottage	II	Green Street			29 April 1987	SU1031569966; 51°25′43″N 1°51′11″W		1192984	Carpenter's Cottage More images	Q26487651
Norris Farm Stable	II	Green Street			29 April 1987	SU1028770003; 51°25′44″N 1°51′12″W		1286353	Upload Photo	Q26574960
High Street Cottages	II	6, Green Street			29 April 1987	SU1027769959; 51°25′43″N 1°51′13″W		1365948	Upload Photo	Q26647588
Manor Farm House	II	Gunsite Road, West Kennett			29 April 1987	SU1095268290; 51°24′49″N 1°50′38″W		1033762	Upload Photo	Q26285257
K6 Telephone Kiosk, Adjoining The Post Office	II	High Street			12 February 1987	SU1012969924; 51°25′42″N 1°51′21″W		1033729	K6 Telephone Kiosk, Adjoining The Post Office More images	Q26285219
Wentworth Monument In Churchyard 17 Metres South Of South Porch, Church Of St James	II	High Street			29 April 1987	SU0996969945; 51°25′42″N 1°51′29″W		1193152	Upload Photo	Q26487813
Nalder Monument 15 Metres South of South Aisle, Church Of St James	II	High Street			29 April 1987	SU0998169948; 51°25′42″N 1°51′28″W		1366110	Upload Photo	Q26647740
Manor Farmhouse and Front Garden Railings	II	High Street			29 April 1987	SU1008869932; 51°25′42″N 1°51′23″W		1033763	Manor Farmhouse and Front Garden Railings More images	Q26285258
Lychgate	II	High Street			29 April 1987	SU1000369902; 51°25′41″N 1°51′27″W		1033764	Upload Photo	Q26285259
The Old Bakery	II	High Street			29 April 1987	SU0997869894; 51°25′41″N 1°51′28″W		1033767	The Old Bakery More images	Q26285263
Surgery	II	High Street			29 April 1987	SU0994069880; 51°25′40″N 1°51′30″W		1033768	Upload Photo	Q26285264
Henge Shop	II	High Street			29 April 1987	SU1011969916; 51°25′41″N 1°51′21″W		1033769	Henge Shop More images	Q26285265
Red Lion Public House	II	High Street			22 August 1966	SU1019669969; 51°25′43″N 1°51′17″W		1192990	Red Lion Public House More images	Q26487657
Front Gate to the Lodge	II	High Street			29 April 1987	SU1016269944; 51°25′42″N 1°51′19″W		1192997	Upload Photo	Q26487663
Church of St James	I	High Street			22 August 1966	SU0997669968; 51°25′43″N 1°51′28″W		1193084	Church of St James More images	Q17529602
Churchyard Cottages	II	High Street			29 April 1987	SU0995669905; 51°25′41″N 1°51′29″W		1193174	Churchyard Cottages More images	Q26487832
Rose Cottage	II	High Street			29 April 1987	SU0994669885; 51°25′40″N 1°51′30″W		1193191	Upload Photo	Q26487847
Pearce's Cottage	II	High Street			21 April 1976	SU1000769886; 51°25′40″N 1°51′27″W		1193249	Upload Photo	Q26487903
Hollis Cottage	II	High Street			29 April 1987	SU0992969879; 51°25′40″N 1°51′31″W		1286265	Upload Photo	Q26574879
Gates and Gateposts to Driveway to Avebury Manor	II	High Street			29 April 1987	SU1003669917; 51°25′41″N 1°51′25″W		1286327	Gates and Gateposts to Driveway to Avebury Manor More images	Q26574936
The Lodge	II	High Street, SN8 1RF			29 April 1987	SU1015669965; 51°25′43″N 1°51′19″W		1365949	The Lodge More images	Q26647589
Leaside Cottage The Forge	II	High Street			29 April 1987	SU0990569872; 51°25′40″N 1°51′32″W		1365953	Upload Photo	Q26647593
Ashdown House and Front Railings	II	High Street			29 April 1987	SU0998069877; 51°25′40″N 1°51′28″W		1365954	Upload Photo	Q26647594
Hawkins Monument in Churchyard, 4 Metres South Of Chancel, Church Of St James	II	High Street			29 April 1987	SU0998469959; 51°25′43″N 1°51′28″W		1033765	Upload Photo	Q26285260
Unidentified Monument in Churchyard, 4 Metres South Of South Aisle, Church Of St James	II	High Street			29 April 1987	SU0997869955; 51°25′43″N 1°51′28″W		1365951	Unidentified Monument in Churchyard, 4 Metres South Of South Aisle, Church Of St James More images	Q26647591
Unidentified Monument in Churchyard, 4 Metres South West Of West Tower, Church Of St James	II	High Street			29 April 1987	SU0996169959; 51°25′43″N 1°51′29″W		1365952	Unidentified Monument in Churchyard, 4 Metres South West Of West Tower, Church Of St James More images	Q26647592
Unidentified Monument in Churchyard, 8 Metres South Of West Tower, Church Of St James	II	High Street			29 April 1987	SU0996269954; 51°25′43″N 1°51′29″W		1193168	Upload Photo	Q26487827
Unidentified Monument in Churchyard,11 Metres South West Of South Aisle, Church Of St James	II	High Street			29 April 1987	SU0996069950; 51°25′42″N 1°51′29″W		1033766	Upload Photo	Q26285261
110-113, High Street	II	110-113, High Street			29 April 1987	SU1005569928; 51°25′42″N 1°51′24″W		1365950	Upload Photo	Q26647590
Vine Cottage	II	South Street, Avebury Truslow			15 February 2001	SU0944669470; 51°25′27″N 1°51′56″W		1271212	Upload Photo	Q26561184
Front Railings and Gates to West Kennett House	II	A4, West Kennett			29 April 1987	SU1132768350; 51°24′51″N 1°50′19″W		1033752	Upload Photo	Q26285245
Cartshed at West Kennett Farm	II	A4, West Kennett			29 April 1987	SU1117368340; 51°24′50″N 1°50′27″W		1033753	Upload Photo	Q26285246
Barns at West Kennett Farm	II	A4, West Kennett			29 April 1987	SU1112368292; 51°24′49″N 1°50′29″W		1033754	Upload Photo	Q26285247
Dovecote at West Kennett Farm	II	A4, West Kennett			29 April 1987	SU1109768253; 51°24′47″N 1°50′31″W		1033755	Upload Photo	Q26285249
West Kennet Farmhouse	II	A4, West Kennett			30 May 1989	SU1118468294; 51°24′49″N 1°50′26″W		1035671	Upload Photo	Q26287248
Jasmine Cottage	II	A4, West Kennett			29 April 1987	SU1109668372; 51°24′51″N 1°50′31″W		1251315	Upload Photo	Q26543287
West Kennett House	II	A4, West Kennett			22 August 1966	SU1133168370; 51°24′51″N 1°50′18″W		1251318	Upload Photo	Q26543290
Wall North of Former Farmyard of Manor Farm House	II	A4, West Kennett			29 April 1987	SU1099268360; 51°24′51″N 1°50′36″W		1365944	Upload Photo	Q26647584
West Boundary Wall of Churchyard	II				29 April 1987	SU0995469962; 51°25′43″N 1°51′30″W		1033787	Upload Photo	Q26285284
Stones Restaurant	II				29 April 1987	SU1004770015; 51°25′45″N 1°51′25″W		1033790	Stones Restaurant More images	Q26285288
National Trust Shop	II				29 April 1987	SU1004269984; 51°25′44″N 1°51′25″W		1192886	National Trust Shop More images	Q26487554
Great Barn	I				22 August 1966	SU1003470034; 51°25′45″N 1°51′25″W		1286423	Great Barn More images	Q17529919
Eastern Gates to Avebury Manor	II	A361			29 April 1987	SU1012970162; 51°25′49″N 1°51′20″W		1365925	Upload Photo	Q26647565
Alexander Keiller Museum	II				29 April 1987	SU0995070010; 51°25′44″N 1°51′30″W		1365961	Alexander Keiller Museum More images	Q26647600

== See also ==
- Grade I listed buildings in Wiltshire
- Grade II* listed buildings in Wiltshire

== Sources ==
- Orbach, Julian; Pevsner, Nikolaus; Cherry, Bridget (2021), Wiltshire, The Buildings of England, New Haven and London: Yale University Press, ISBN 978-0-300-25120-3
