= Appleford School =

Location
- Shrewton, Wiltshire, SP3 4HL; England; 51.2032°N 1.9042°W

Information
- Type: Independent; Coeducational
- Motto: "A unique path to success"
- Established: 1988
- Founder: Peter Gardner and Gerald Trump
- Department for Education URN: 126535 Tables
- Head: David King
- Gender: Mixed
- Age: 7 to 16
- Enrolment: Approx 156
- Colour
- Website: www.applefordschool.org

Appleford School is a private specialist dyslexia school near Shrewton in Wiltshire, England.

== History ==
Appleford was founded in 1988 by Dr Peter Gardner, a chartered educational psychologist, a chartered forensic psychologist and a chartered counselling psychologist of the British Psychological Society, and Gerald Trump. Zoë Wanamaker later became patron of Appleford. It was originally a prep school for pupils aged 7 to 13, and later expanded to take pupils up to 18 years old, studying BTECs and GCSEs.

Appleford specialises in teaching pupils with dyslexia, dyscalculia and dyspraxia. The school is accredited by the Council for the Registration of Schools Teaching Dyslexic Pupils (CReSTeD).

In 2012, 2015 and 2023 the Independent Schools Inspectorate rated the school "excellent" in all areas, and in 2018 all standards were met in the Regulatory Compliance inspection. In the Independent School Awards, Appleford was shortlisted in 2014 and 2015 in two categories, won the Award for Outstanding Sport (Small School) in 2018, and was shortlisted in 2019 for the Outstanding Provision for Learning Support Award. In 2021 Appleford won the Bronze Lockdown Hero Award for Learner and Community Support in the Pearson National Teaching Awards, and in 2021 and 2022 was shortlisted for the Small Independent School of the Year in the Independent School of the Year Awards.

== General information ==
The school has a maximum of 10 pupils per class. It employs a range of staff, including specialist teachers and therapists. The school gives access to qualifications including GCSEs (with options at Year 8) and BTEC Vocational and Functional Skills Certificates. It takes pupils on a day, week or full board basis.

== Houses ==
The school is split into five houses: Maddington House, Willow House, Elm House, The Beeches and Oak House. All boarding houses are on the main school site, except Maddington House which is in the nearby village of Shrewton.
