= St Andrew's Church, Rollestone =

Coordinates: 51.1872°N 1.8962°W

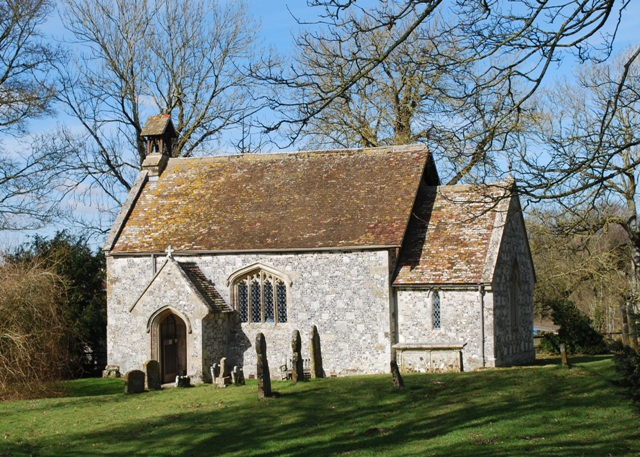
- St Andrew's Church, Rollestone, from the south

- Location in Wiltshire
- OS grid reference: SU 074 431
- Location: Rollestone, Shrewton, Wiltshire
- Country: England
- Denomination: Anglican
- Website: Churches Conservation Trust

Architecture
- Functional status: Redundant
- Heritage designation: Grade II*
- Designated: 18 February 1952
- Architectural type: Church

Specifications
- Materials: Flint and stone

St Andrew's Church is in Rollestone Road, Rollestone, Wiltshire, England. It is a redundant Anglican church in the care of the Churches Conservation Trust. It was declared redundant on 1 July 1993, and was vested in the Trust on 8 February 1995. The church is recorded in the National Heritage List for England as a designated Grade II* listed building.

St Andrew's was built in the early 13th century. For the early part of its history, until the Dissolution of the Monasteries, the church was a possession of the Knights Hospitaller. It has been suggested that Jane Seymour was baptised at the church in the early 16th century around 1508, however this may be a confusion with another child of the same name.

It is constructed in flint and stone in a chequerwork pattern. The church consists of a chancel and nave which was given a new roof in the 16th century. The nave is 32 feet (9.8 m) by 15 feet (4.6 m) while the chancel is 9 feet 8 inches (2.95 m) by 9 feet 6 inches (2.90 m). Rebuilding work on the chancel and chancel arch were undertaken in 1845. The church has two large Perpendicular windows. The stained glass is 17th century. The font dating from the 13th century and has a 17th-century cover. The oak benches were brought from the redundant church of St Catherine's at Haydon, Dorset in 1981.

Rollestone became part of the parish of Shrewton in the early 20th century. The parish now includes St Mary's Church, Maddington as well.

== See also ==
- List of churches preserved by the Churches Conservation Trust in Southwest England
