= George Bancroft (translator) =

English clergyman and translator

George Bancroft, also known as George Bancrafte (died 1573?) was an English clergyman and translator.

== Life ==
He was rector of Grittleton, Wiltshire, and chaplain to William Parr, 1st Marquess of Northampton, in the 1540s. Under Mary I of England Bancroft was sheltered by the patronage of Andrew Baynton, having a living at Bromham when he lost that at Grittleton. Under Elizabeth I of England his position then improved.

== Works ==
Bancroft translated into English as The answere that the preachers of the gospel at Basile made (1548) the Latin Protestant polemic Responsio Prædicatorum Basileensium in defensionem rectæ Administrationis Cœnee Dominicæ, defending the Reformation at Basel, and attacking Catholic views of the Eucharist.
