= Grittleton =

Village in Wiltshire, England

Coordinates: 51.519°N 2.203°W

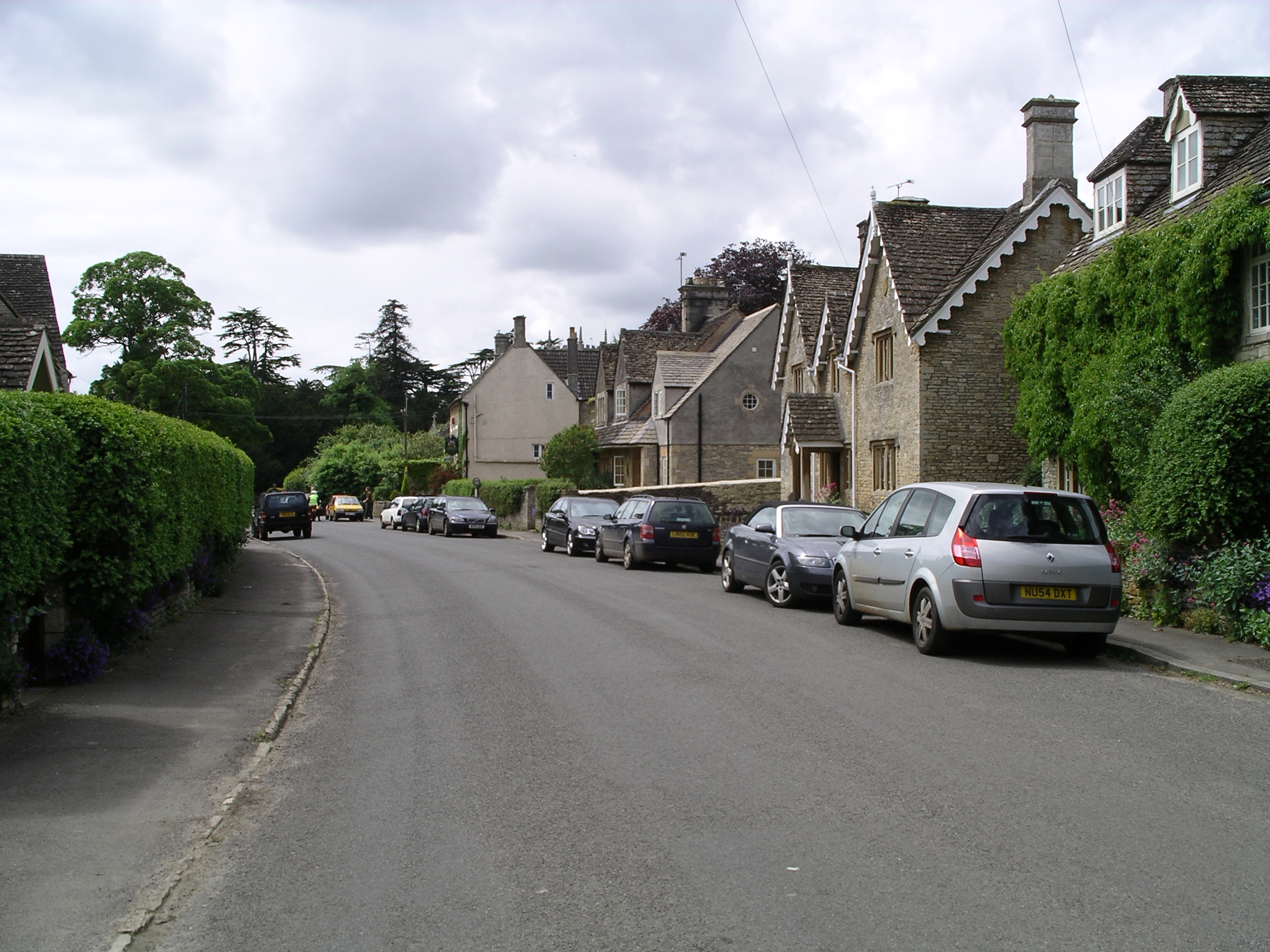
- Grittleton village (westwards)

- Location within Wiltshire
- Population: 539 (in 2011)
- OS grid reference: ST860800
- Civil parish: Grittleton
- Unitary authority: Wiltshire
- Ceremonial county: Wiltshire
- Region: South West
- Country: England
- Sovereign state: United Kingdom
- Post town: Chippenham
- Postcode district: SN14
- Dialling code: 01249
- Police: Wiltshire
- Fire: Dorset and Wiltshire
- Ambulance: South Western
- UK Parliament: South Cotswolds
- Website: Community site

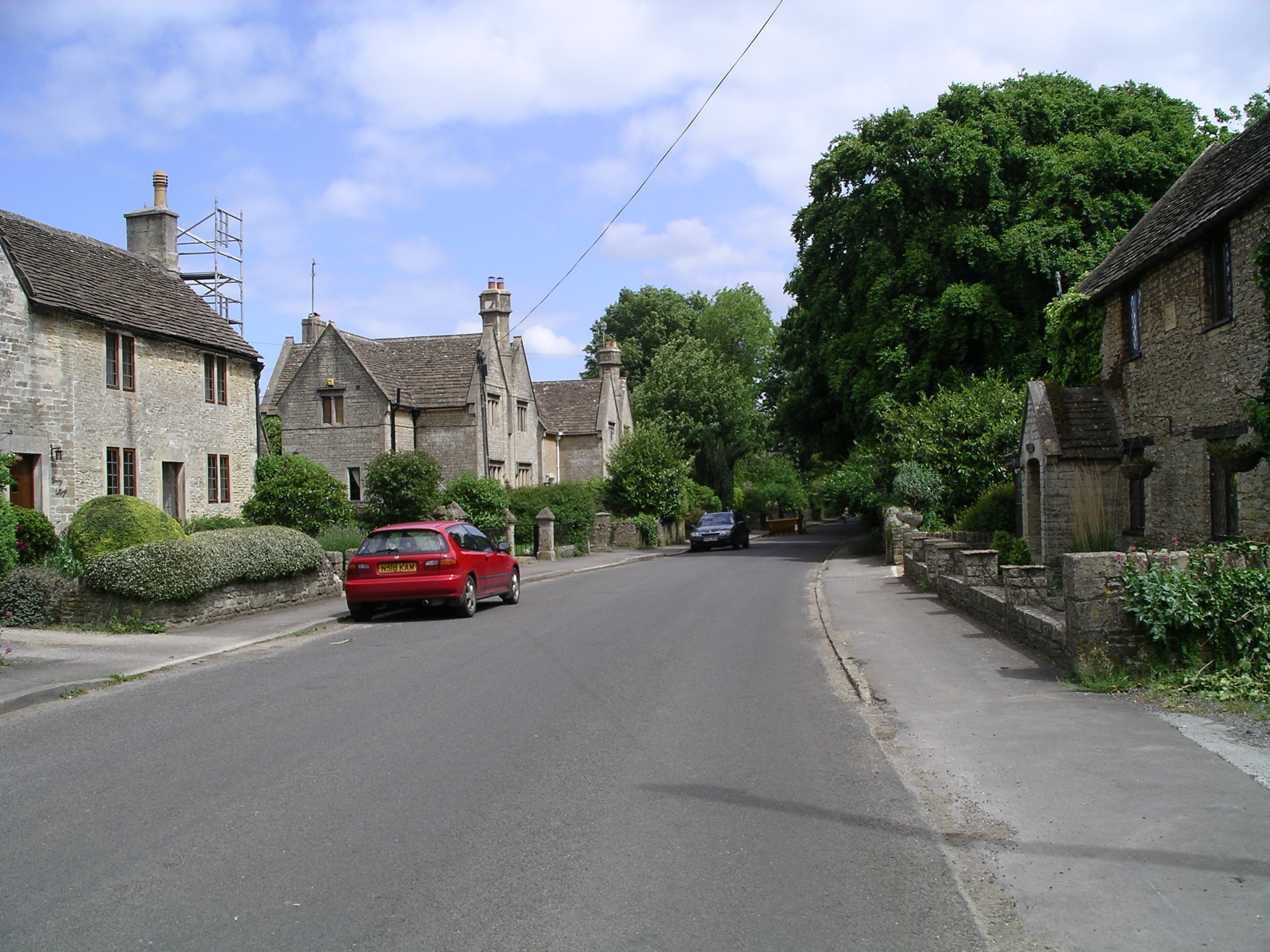
Grittleton village (eastwards)

Grittleton is a village and civil parish in Wiltshire, England, 6 miles (10 km) northwest of Chippenham. The parish includes the hamlets of Foscote, Leigh Delamere, Littleton Drew and Sevington, and part of the hamlet of The Gibb.

The Gauze Brook, a small tributary of the Avon, rises near Littleton Drew and flows east across the parish. The M4 motorway was opened in 1971 across the south of the parish, passing close to The Gibb, Foscote, Sevington and Leigh Delamere.

== History ==
The Fosse Way Roman road crosses the parish from north to southwest. The Domesday Book of 1086 recorded settlements of 23 households at Gretelintone, 15 at Sevamentone (Sevington) and 16 at Liteltone (Littleton Drew).

The Grittleton estate was bought in 1828 by Joseph Neeld, a London lawyer who had inherited a considerable sum. Over time he replaced the manor house with a much larger building, and built lodges and extensive stables. His philanthropy in the parish included the rebuilding of the near-derelict church at Leigh Delamere and construction of a row of six almshouses nearby; farms were improved and houses were built for estate workers, together with a small private school at Sevington. After Joseph's death in 1856 the estate passed to his brother John.

Schools were built at Grittleton in 1858 (closed 1975) and Littleton Drew in 1850 (closed 1926).

== Notable buildings ==
Grittleton House, a large Grade II* listed country house across the road from St Mary's Church, was built between 1832 and 1856 for Joseph Neeld, replacing a 17th-century house. Architects were James Thomson and (later) Henry Clutton. Neeld also built lodges and an extensive stables complex (c. 1835). Between 1951 and 2016 the house was the home of an independent school.

In 1848, Joseph Neeld built a small private school for the children of estate workers at Sevington. Thomson was again the architect, and he re-used stonework, including the bell tower, from the Church of St Margaret of Antioch at Leigh Delamere, which had been rebuilt in 1846. The school closed in 1913 but the schoolroom remained largely unchanged; the schoolroom and schoolteacher's house were designated as Grade II* listed in 1988. Since 1991 the schoolroom has been used as a re-enactment centre for primary school children.

== Religious sites ==
=== Church of England ===
All three Church of England parish churches within the modern civil parish are Grade II* listed.

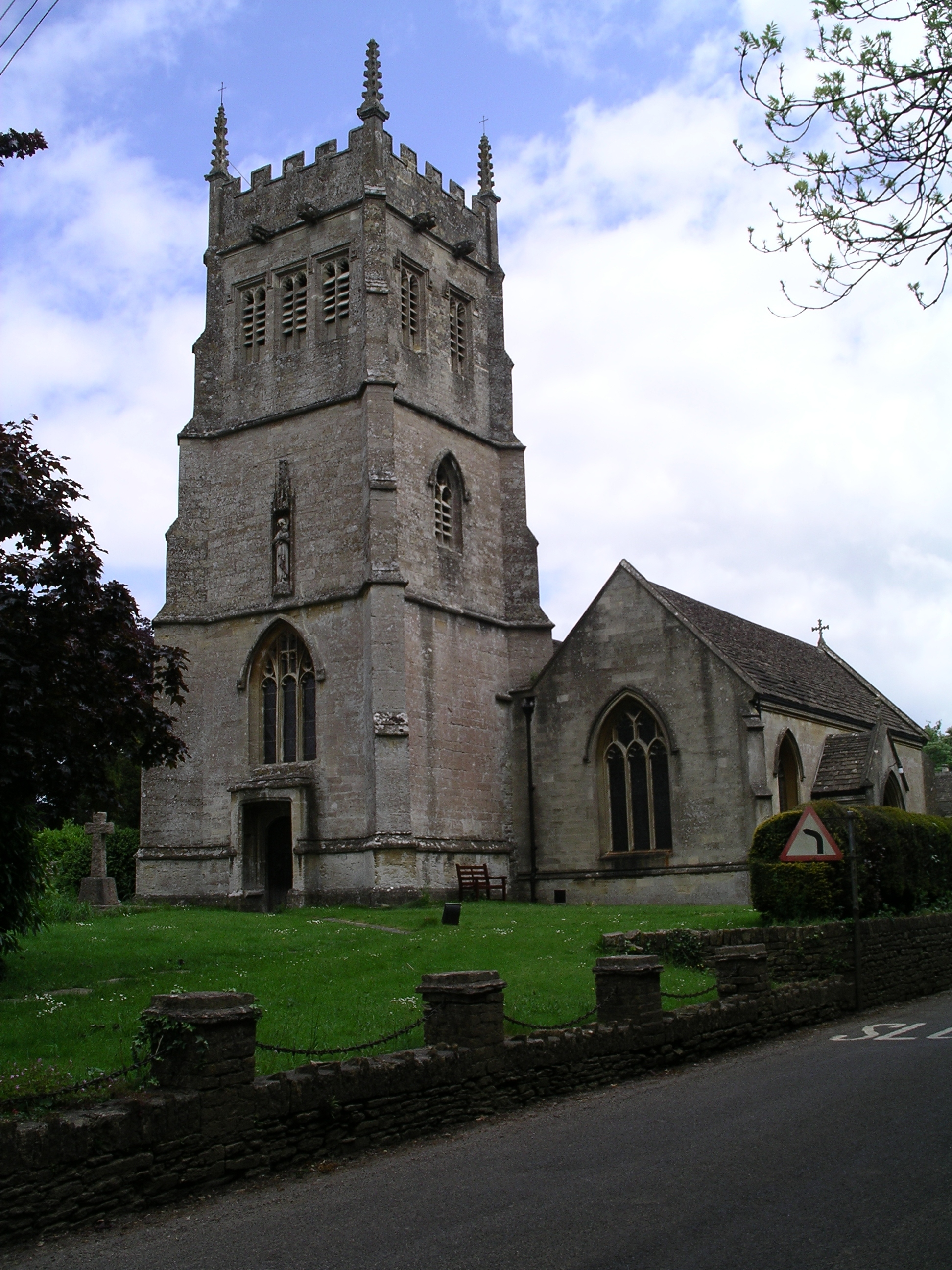
St Mary's Church, Grittleton

Lands in the Grittleton area were owned in Anglo-Saxon times, as recorded by the Domesday Book of 1086. The church of St Mary the Virgin, Grittleton, originates from c. 1200 and the four-bay north arcade survives from that date. The three-stage tower is from the 15th century. Much work was carried out in the 19th century: in 1835-6 the Neeld family added a large pew; in 1836 the south aisle was added by John Pinch the younger; and the church was heavily restored by A.W. Blomfield in 1865–7 at the expense of the Neelds. Work later in the century included re-roofing, replacement of windows and addition of memorials to members of the Neeld family.

The tower has six bells, two of them from the late 15th century. Today the church is part of the Bybrook Team Ministry.

All Saints' Church, Littleton Drew, was rebuilt (except for its 15th-century central tower) by T.H. Wyatt in 1856. The date of the previous church is uncertain; the font is from the 13th century and an incumbent was recorded in 1318. The three bells in the tower are from the late 15th and early 16th centuries. A medieval stone cross, found in the church in 1848, was restored and erected in the churchyard north of the church. Stained glass in the east window, 1856, is by C. and A. Gibbs. The benefice of Littleton Drew was united with Nettleton in 1960; today the church is part of the Bybrook Team Ministry.

St Margaret's Church, Leigh Delamere, was built in 1846 at the expense of Joseph Neeld on the site of a 12th-century church; the architect was James Thompson. The benefices of Leigh Delamere and Grittleton were united in 1924. The church was declared redundant in 1992 and is now in the care of the Churches Conservation Trust.

=== Non-conformist ===
Littleton Drew had a Congregational chapel, a single-storey building from the early 19th century. Records exist for 1817–1910.

A Baptist chapel was built at Grittleton c. 1720 and is Grade II* listed. The chapel closed in 1982 and was acquired by the Historic Chapels Trust in 2011.

== Local government ==
The civil parish elects a parish council. It is in the area of Wiltshire Council unitary authority, which is responsible for all significant local government functions.

Leigh Delamere and Littleton Drew were separate civil parishes until 1934; at the 1841 census their populations were 113 and 251. The parishes included the hamlets of Sevington and The Gibb respectively.

== Notable people ==
Catherine Stepney, novelist, was born here in 1778. Notable rectors include George Bancroft (translator, 16th century); and Thomas Tully (theologian and writer, 1620–1676).

== Amenities ==
Grittleton has a pub, the Neeld Arms, a 19th-century building with a 17th-century core. The Salutation Inn at The Gibb is immediately outside the parish boundary.

Grittleton village hall is a modern building. The small school at Littleton Drew, once used as a village hall, is now a private house.
