= Adam House, Calne =

House in Calne, Wiltshire, England

Coordinates: 51°26′10″N 2°00′04″W

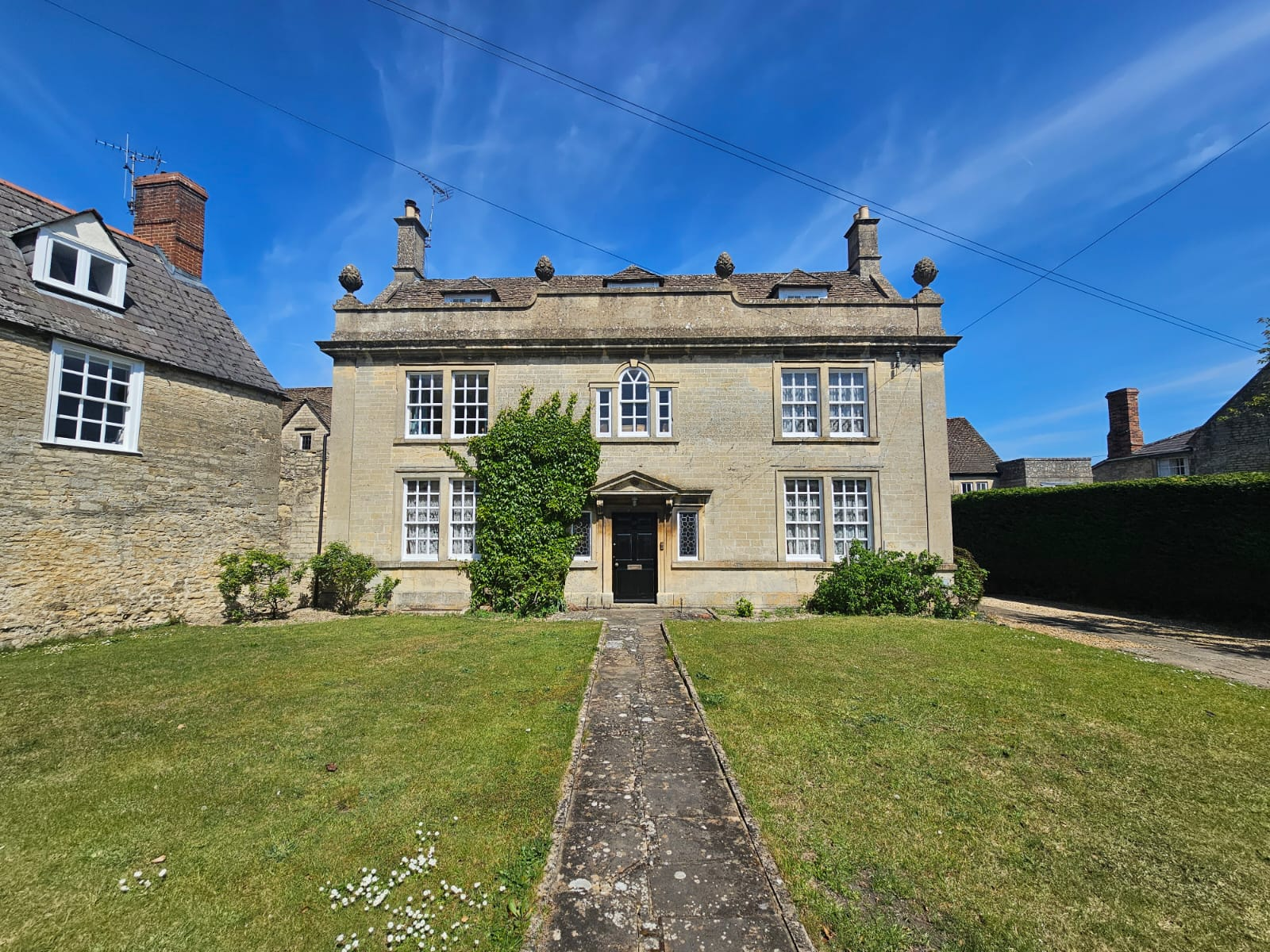
Adam House in 2025

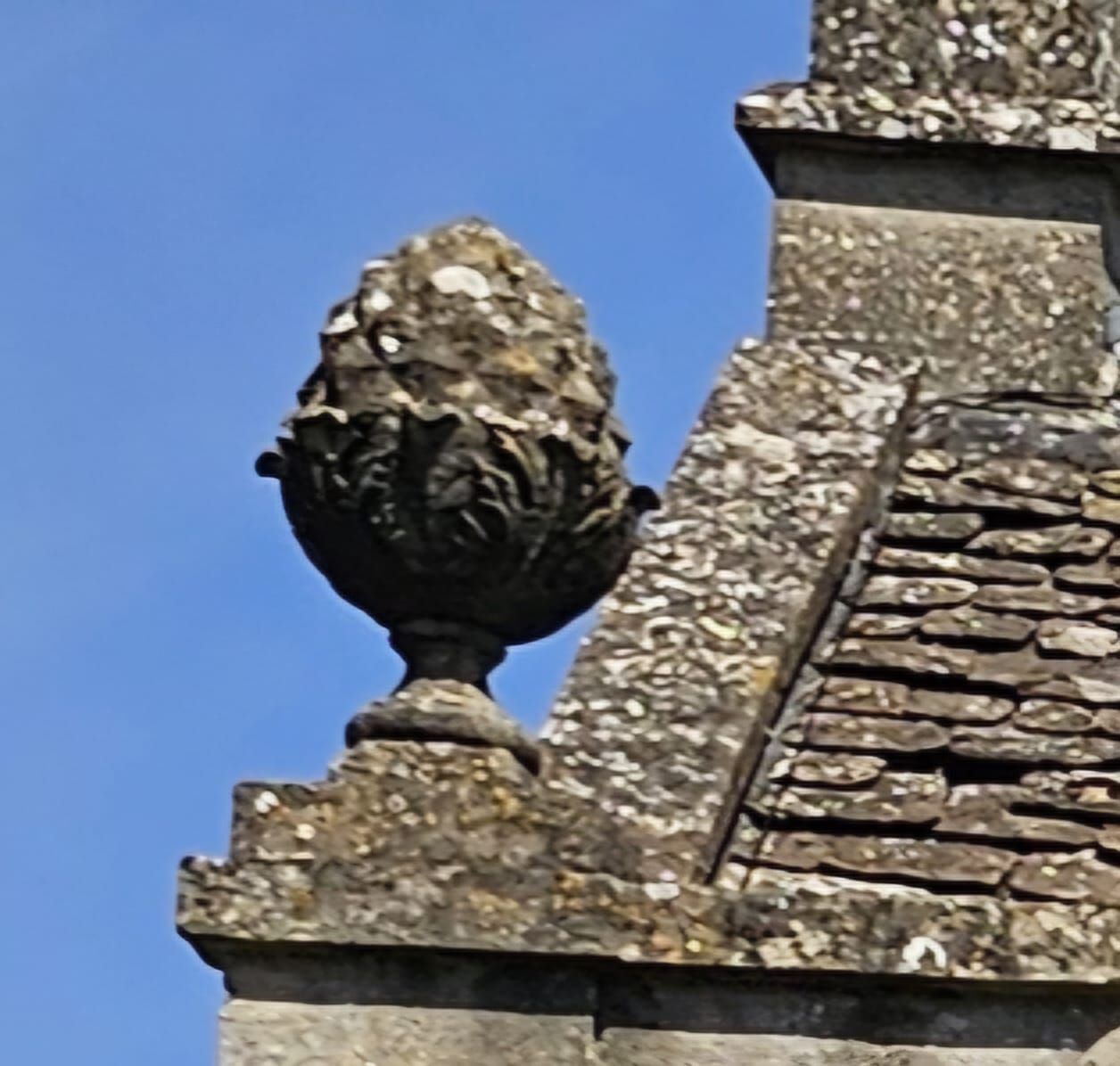
The left-most stone pineapple

Adam House is a 17th-century house at 13 The Green, Calne, Wiltshire, England. An example of Georgian architecture, it has been Grade II* listed since 1950.

It is a six/seven bedroom, L-shaped house that dates from the 17th century, and was refaced using limestone ashlar in c.1740 (Historic England) or the 1760s (Julian Orbach). There are 19th and 20th century interior and rear additions.

The house was originally timber framed. There is coursed rubblestone to the rear, and the stone slate roof has coped gables and moulded chimney stacks to the gable ends. The three-bay front has a central door, with a small Venetian window above it. The parapet is ramped higher in the centre and is adorned with four stone pineapples.

It was said by Lord Shelbourne to be named after the architect Robert Adam, who lived there while working on Bowood House.
