= Angel Hotel, Chippenham =

Hotel in Chippenham, Wiltshire, England

Coordinates: 51.4577°N 2.1146°W

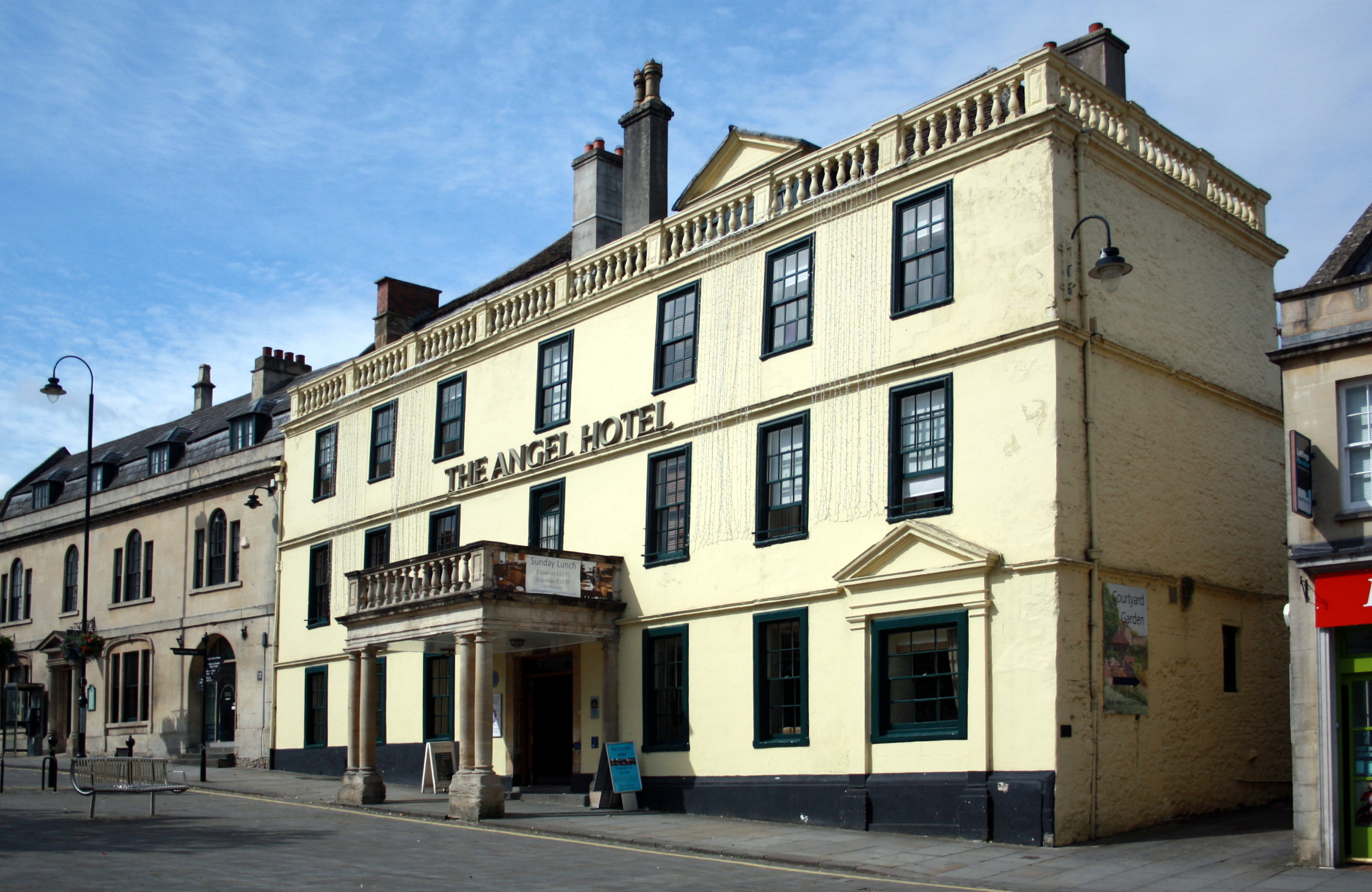
The Angel Hotel

The Angel Hotel is a grade II* listed hotel in Chippenham, Wiltshire, England.

There was an inn called the Bull on this site, on the west side of the town's market place, in 1613; by 1747 it was known as the Angel. The buildings were remodelled and refronted in the early 18th century when the inn expanded into the adjacent house; the frontage has seven bays and three storeys.
