= Grade II* listed buildings in Wiltshire =

Wiltshire shown within England

There are over 20,000 Grade II* listed buildings in England. As the county of Wiltshire contains 727 of these sites they have been split into alphabetical order.

- Grade II* listed buildings in Wiltshire (A–G)
- Grade II* listed buildings in Wiltshire (H–O)
- Grade II* listed buildings in Wiltshire (P–Z)

== See also ==
- Grade I listed buildings in Wiltshire
