= Cantax House =

House in Lacock, Wiltshire, England

Coordinates: 51°24′59″N 2°07′26″W

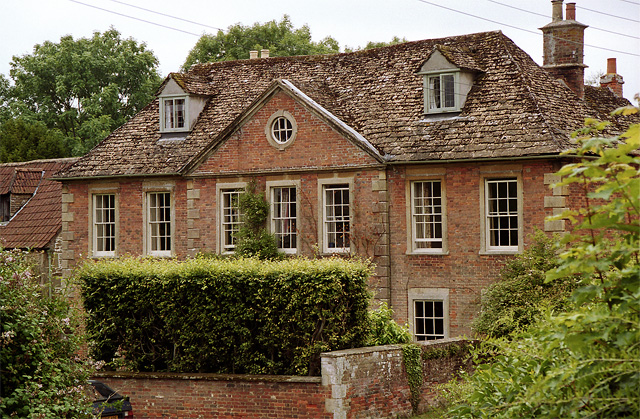
Cantax House

Cantax House is a grade II* listed house in Cantax Hill, Lacock, Wiltshire, England. It dates from around 1700 and is of red brick with ashlar dressings and a hipped stone slate roof. It was used as the Lacock vicarage until 1866. Part of the garden wall is also listed.

In 2007, scenes for the film Harry Potter and the Half-Blood Prince were shot outside the house.
