= Frowds Almshouses =

Almshouses in Salisbury, Wiltshire, England

Coordinates: 51°04′17″N 1°47′36″W

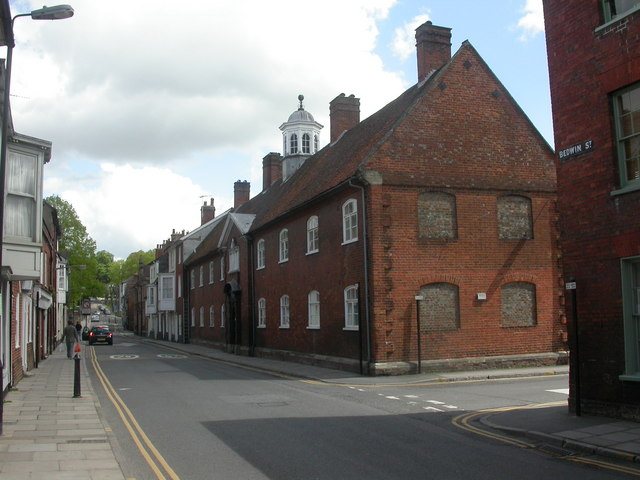
Frowd's Almshouses

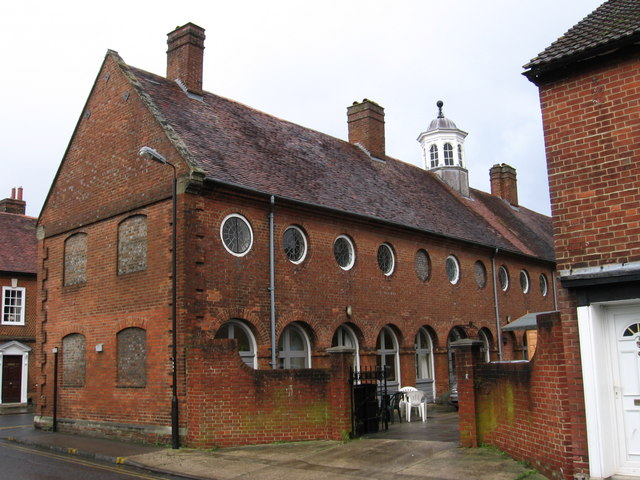
Rear view

Frowds Almshouses are Grade II* listed almshouses at 1–12 Bedwin Street in Salisbury, Wiltshire, England. An inscribed stone above the original entrance reads: "Built and Endow'd by the Liberality of Mr EDWARD FROWD Merch[an]t late of this City. 1750."

The building was constructed under the terms of the will of wealthy merchant Edward Frowd (d. 1720), who directed that a sum of £8,000 from his estate was to be invested to provide an annual income for his sister Lydia Guest and that upon her death (which occurred in 1745) £7,500 of that sum should be used to build 24 almshouses near to St Edmund's Church in Salisbury. They were to be "built after a husbandly manner but to have little gardens to each house and so built that the poor people may have a comfortable living therein…" Land at the corner of Bedwin Street and Rollestone Street was bought in 1749 and the almshouses were built there. Frowd's will directed that the almshouses should be for twelve poor men and twelve poor women from the parish of St Edmund’s, unless any of his own relations were in need, and that a pew be made for them to sit together in the church.
