= St Peter's Church, Everleigh =

St Peter's Church
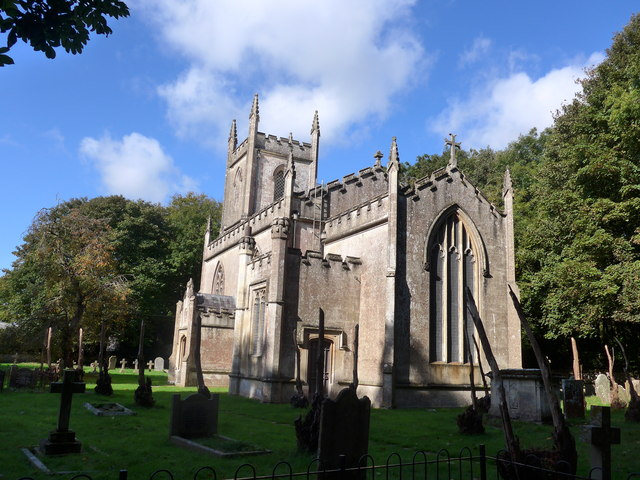

- Location within Wiltshire
- 51°17′11″N 1°43′02″W
- Location: Everleigh, Wiltshire, England

Listed Building – Grade II*
- Designated: 27 May 1964
- Reference no.: 1035994

St Peter's Church, in Everleigh, Wiltshire, England was built in 1813 by John Morlidge for F.D. Astley. It is recorded in the National Heritage List for England as a Grade II* listed building, and is now a redundant church in the care of the Churches Conservation Trust.

Everleigh had a parish church by 1228, when it was granted to the Benedictine Wherwell Abbey in Hampshire. The advowson was held by the abbey until the Dissolution of the Monasteries after which is passed to Thomas Wriothesley and his descendants. The mediaeval parish church was demolished in 1814 and the present Church of England parish church of Saint Peter was consecrated on a site about 0.5 miles (800 m) north-west of it. The present church was designed by the architect John Morlidge in a Georgian Gothic Revival style for Sir Francis Dugdale Astley.

The church is built of Bath stone. It consists of a nave with the south porch attached, chancel with a south chapel, and a west tower. The nave is 41 feet 6 inches (12.65 m) by 26 feet (7.9 m), while the chancel is 16 feet (4.9 m) long and 14 feet (4.3 m) wide. The tower holds six bells cast by James Wells of Aldbourne.

The interior contains the bowl of the Norman font from the old church, on a later base and shaft. The bowl is decorated with scallop shaped decorations separated by inverted "V" shapes. There are many memorials to the Astley family. There is a large gallery above the west end of the nave, which when it was built held a barrel organ. The organ was replaced by one in the vestry in 1879.

The church was declared redundant on 18 April 1974, and was vested in the Trust on 22 October 1975. It is open to visitors every day; the key is held locally.

== See also ==
- List of churches preserved by the Churches Conservation Trust in South West England
