= St Mary's Church, Chute Forest =

St Mary's Church
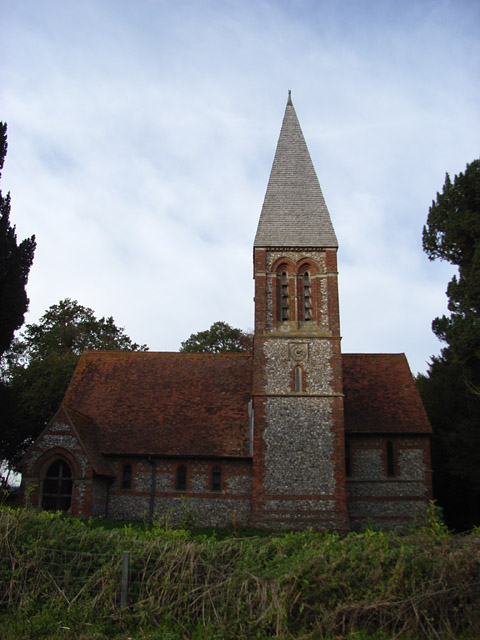

- Location within Wiltshire
- 51°16′01″N 1°33′30″W
- Location: Chute Forest, Wiltshire, England

History
- Built: 1870-1871

Site notes
- Architect: John Loughborough Pearson

Listed Building – Grade II*
- Official name: Church of St Mary
- Designated: 8 May 1972
- Reference no.: 1364574

St Mary's Church in Chute Forest, Wiltshire, England, was built between 1870 and 1871 and consecrated in 1875. It is recorded in the National Heritage List for England as a designated Grade II* listed building, and is now a redundant church in the care of the Churches Conservation Trust. It was declared redundant on 23 August 1972, and was vested in the Trust on 26 March 1974.

The church was built of knapped flint, brick and tile with a pyramid spire, by John Loughborough Pearson for the Fowle family. At the time there were 188 parishioners. It was consecrated by the Bishop of Salisbury on 15 August 1872. The nave and aisles are spanned by a single roof. There are encaustic tiles on the raised floor of the chancel.

The roof is of open trussed timber rafters. There is a three-stage tower topped with the spire which is a highly visible from the surrounding area. The church had six bells cast in 1871 by Mears & Stainbank of Whitechapel Bell Foundry. In 1976 these were removed and rehung in the Church of St Nicholas in Chute. The west window includes stained glass by Clayton and Bell a partnership of John Richard Clayton (London, 1827–1913) and Alfred Bell (Silton, Dorset, 1832–95). The west window has glass also from 1914 but in a different style. There is a wall tablet to Frank G. Fowle who died in 1942.

The parish was merged with that of Chute in 1954. The Chute Forest church closed in 1972. An annual service is still held at the church.

== See also ==
- List of churches preserved by the Churches Conservation Trust in Southwest England
- List of new ecclesiastical buildings by J. L. Pearson
