= Dauntsey Park House =

Country house in Dauntsey, Wiltshire, England

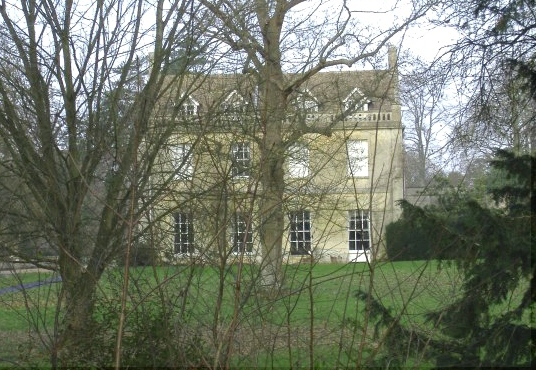
- Dauntsey Park House

- Location within Wiltshire

General information
- Location: Wiltshire, South West England
- Coordinates: 51.5413°N 2.0309°W
- Renovated: c.1800
- Client: Henry Meux

Design and construction
- Designations: Grade II* listed building

Dauntsey Park House is a Grade II* listed country house in Dauntsey, Wiltshire, England. It is based on a 14th-century manor, remodelled in the late 17th century or early 18th, and altered again c.1800 when it was recased in ashlar.
