= Alexander House, Corsham =

House in Corsham, Wiltshire, England

Coordinates: 51°25′56″N 2°11′08″W

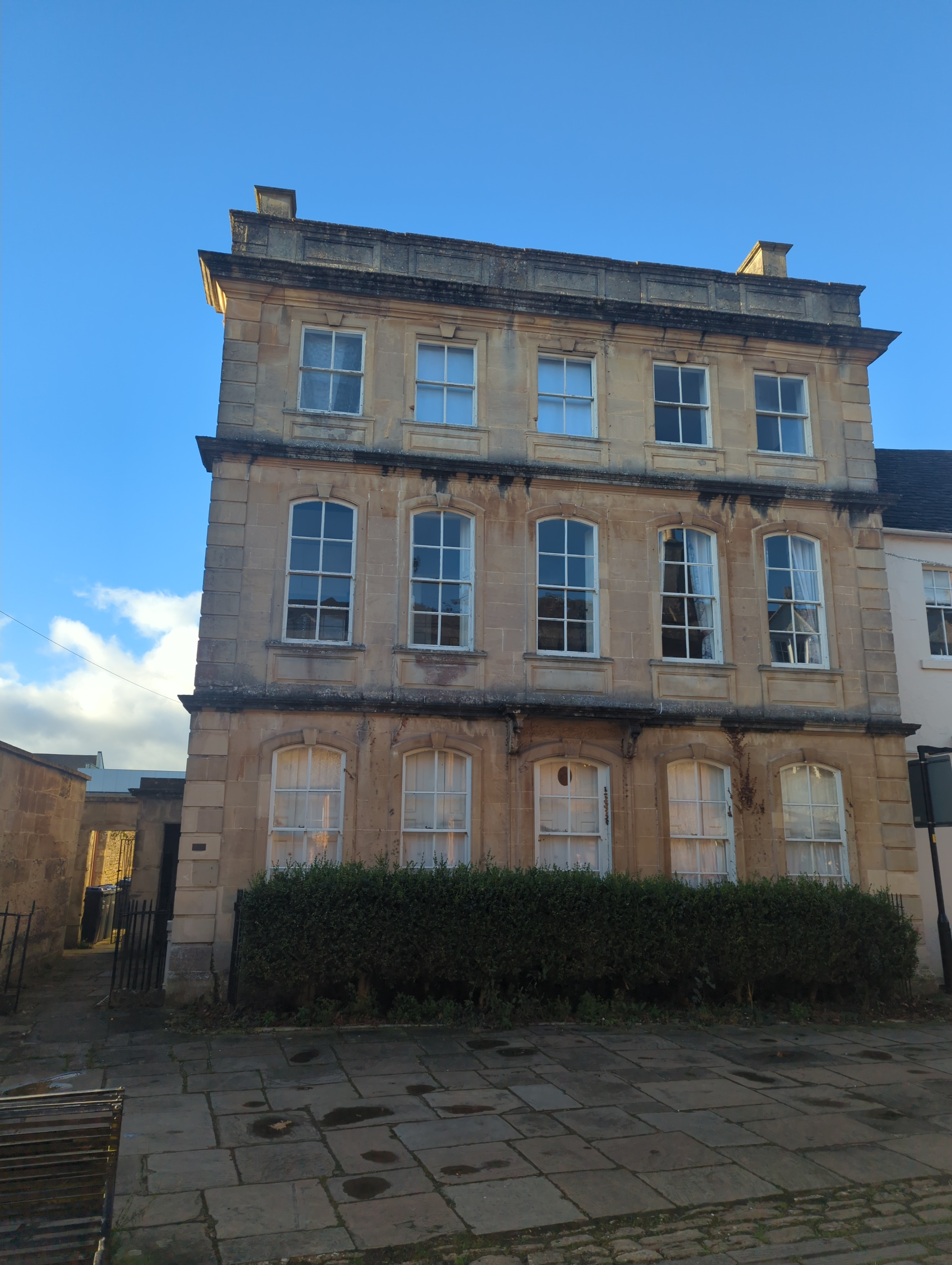

Alexander House is a Grade II* listed house at High Street, Corsham, in Wiltshire, England. It dates from the early eighteenth century and is ashlar fronted with stone tiled roofs. The building was the Corsham maternity home from about 1913 to 1950.
