= Sevington Victorian School =

Building in Grittleton, Wiltshire, England

Coordinates: 51.5080°N 2.1871°W

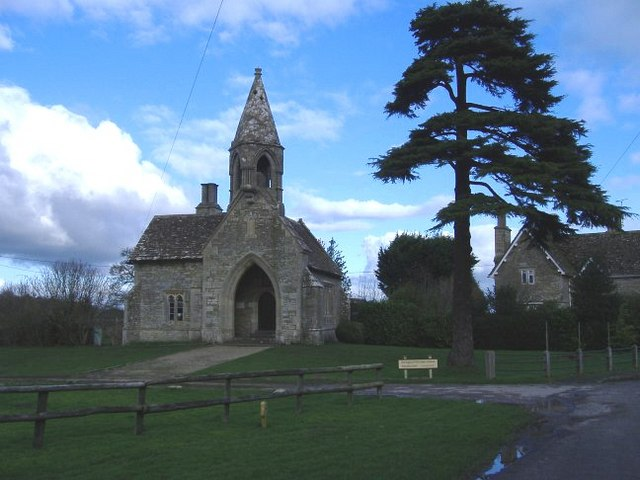
Sevington School

Sevington School, near the village of Grittleton, Wiltshire, England, was built in 1848 by Joseph Neeld, a landowner, for the children of his estate workers. It was built in the fashionable Neo-Gothic style and included a schoolroom and teacher’s house with parlour, kitchen and two bedrooms. The curriculum of the private school was narrow and designed to fit pupils for their station in life, either in service or as farm labourers on the Neeld estates. In 1860 Miss Elizabeth Squire was engaged as schoolteacher and she remained in charge until the school closed in 1913. Today it is used as a re-enactment centre for primary school children, and is open to the public during the summer. The building is Grade II* listed by Historic England.

== Building ==
The earliest reference to Sevington School occurs in a census of Wiltshire schools, undertaken in 1859. The recorder describes "a very picturesque school and teacher’s house with boarded floor ‘en parquet’ and wall desks. It is supported by the lord of the manor, who pays the mistress’s stipend, the school pence being applied to other purposes."

More than a century later, Nikolaus Pevsner endorsed this judgment, describing the schoolroom as "an outstanding example of a very small village school of the mid C19 with original furnishing, edge-grain and wood-block floor and fireplace" in his series The Buildings of England. The school was built at the height of the Gothic Revival and the architect, James Thomson, seems to have been aiming for a picturesque effect. Thomson had rebuilt the derelict Church of St Margaret of Antioch at nearby Leigh Delamere in 1846, also at Joseph Neeld's expense. Material from the church was incorporated into the school building, including the massive bell tower, doorway arch and 15th century reredos.

Today both the schoolroom and schoolhouse are Grade II* listed buildings for their architectural and historical significance, and the unusual floor in the school room continues to attract the interest of visitors.

== Teachers ==
When the school opened in 1849, the first teacher was probably Mary Wilmot. She appears in the 1851 census for Sevington, aged 45 and with the occupation of schoolteacher. Her son, Nathaniel Wilmot is listed in the school register for 1858. According to local memory, her husband, John Wilmot, a road mender, was also involved with the school. A former pupil, interviewed by the Wiltshire Gazette many years later, describes him as the schoolmaster, adding that "We used to pay so much a week and my father always took the money down but I was not there for very long for I left at seven and went bird-scaring, earning a shilling or two a week. I was the eldest of nine and went out early to help the home."

In 1860 Miss Elisabeth Squire took up the post of schoolmistress, recording in a memorandum written towards the end of her life that "I came here in April 1860. 19 years old." She is shown staying with Sarah Westcott, the school mistress of Grittleton House School on the night of the 1861 census. Sarah Westcott was older than Miss Squire, but they both gave their place of origin as Martock, Somerset, so it may be that Mrs Westcott recommended the younger woman to the Neeld family. The appointment must have been a success as Miss Squire remained in post until 1913, when declining numbers and her advancing years led to the closure of the school. She stayed on in the schoolhouse until her death in 1927. The schoolhouse was then rented out to a series of tenants but the schoolroom remained more or less untouched.

== The Victorian experience ==
The school was built for twenty-two pupils, the sons and daughters of agricultural labourers who worked on the Neeld estates. It seems from the register that most boys had left school by the time they were ten. Even before that, attendance for some families was sporadic with boys taking time off school to earn a little money by pig keeping and bird scaring. Attendance in late July was generally very low, presumably because it was harvest time. In common with many rural schools of the period, girls tended to stay on longer than boys.

Leavers had an opportunity to continue their education by attending the Sunday School which Miss Squire offered to her former pupils. The register shows eleven boys and two girls on her register for 1862. By June, one of the girls was left and was shown as going into service. She was twelve. It is not clear whether the Sunday pupils paid for their schooling but the register shows that day pupils were expected to pay a penny a week. The money went towards oil for the lamps, coal for the schoolroom and supplemented Miss Squire’s salary. She kept a careful record of who had paid and totted it up at the end of each term. Some families seem to have struggled and certain pupils, often in large family are marked as paying a ha’pence. Even then, a period of half payment was sometimes followed by a prolonged absence.

Former pupils remembered Miss Squire as a tall, vigorous woman who loved her garden and maintained excellent discipline without the need for corporal punishment. By the end of her time there she seems to have been earning £50 a year and living rent free in the school house next door. There was always someone to keep house and chaperone her – first her mother, then her niece and finally her sister Hannah.

Because Sevington was a private school, there is no logbook or details of the curriculum. It is safe to assume that the education was very basic, with an emphasis on religion, reading, writing and arithmetic. Many of the schoolbooks, maps and charts used by Miss Squire still survive and demonstrate a strong emphasis on the Victorian virtues of piety, thrift, hard work and patriotism. A small collection of samplers showing both functional and decorative work suggests that needlework was an important part of the curriculum for the girls.

Sevington School was not state-funded and Miss Squire was spared the visits of Her Majesty’s inspectors but it is clear that there were regular visits by the Diocesan inspector, who was tasked by the Bishop of Salisbury with assessing the religious knowledge of her pupils. In 1895 he wrote "This pleasant little school is being well taught and trained and the children have again passed a very satisfactory Examination in the Elementary Subjects in which they have been instructed."

== Today ==
When the school closed in 1913, the contents of the schoolroom were left untouched. Miss Squire’s reading books, Bibles and sets of psalters were still in the cupboard and the desks and benches, blackboard and pointer remained just where she had left them. Two of the girls’ straw bonnets, donated by the Neeld family, hung on a peg by the door and the inkwells were arranged on the side, awaiting the attention of the ink monitor.

In 1987, the owner, Mr Ralph Neeld approached the local education authority to discuss the possibility of renting the property for use as a history resource. A charity, the Sevington School Project, was set up in 1991 and signed a 21-year repairing lease. When this expired in 2012, the charity bought the school with the help of a grant from the Heritage Lottery Fund. Today, more than a thousand school children visit the school in the course of each year, to take part in re-enactments of a Victorian school day.

The building is open to members of the public in the summer months and attracts many community groups and societies.
