= Shrewton =

Village in Wiltshire, England

Coordinates: 51.194°N 1.904°W

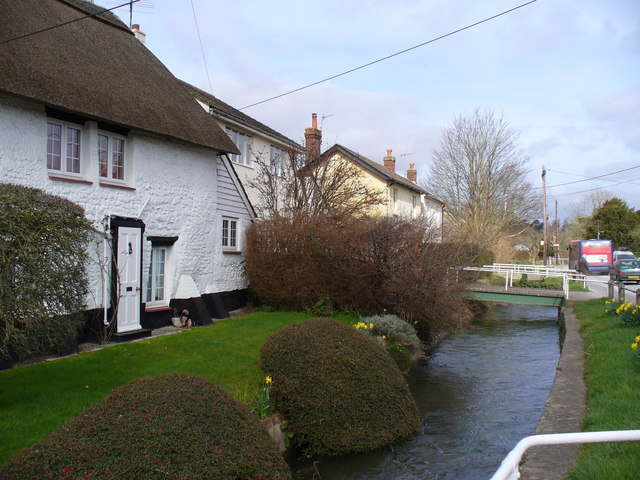
- High Street and River Till

- Location within Wiltshire
- Population: 1,724 (in 2021)
- OS grid reference: SU068439
- Civil parish: Shrewton
- Unitary authority: Wiltshire
- Ceremonial county: Wiltshire
- Region: South West
- Country: England
- Sovereign state: United Kingdom
- Post town: Salisbury
- Postcode district: SP3
- Dialling code: 01980
- Police: Wiltshire
- Fire: Dorset and Wiltshire
- Ambulance: South Western
- UK Parliament: East Wiltshire
- Website: Parish Council

Shrewton is a village and civil parish on Salisbury Plain in Wiltshire, England, around 6 miles (9.7 km) west of Amesbury and 14 miles (23 km) north of Salisbury. It lies on the A360 road between Stonehenge and Tilshead. It is close to the source of the River Till, which flows south to Stapleford.

== History ==
The Domesday Book of 1086 recorded three estates held by Edward of Salisbury at Wintreburne, in all with 43 households. The name Shrewton came into use from 1236 and is derived from the Old English scīr-rēfa tūn, meaning 'sheriff's farm or settlement'.

Addeston was a village of medieval origin, which now forms an integral part of the modern village of Shrewton. The place name survives in Addestone Farm (grid reference SU 0655 4300) and Addestone Manor (SU 0673 4330).

A village or hamlet called Netton lay in the east of the parish, but dwindled away by the 19th century; the name survives in Nett Road and Net Down.

In 1934 the civil parish of Shrewton was enlarged by the addition of the parishes of Maddington (to the south and west) and Rollestone (south and east).

RAF Shrewton, a Second World War Royal Air Force airfield with grass runways, was to the north of village. It closed in 1946 and its site returned to farmland.

== Governance ==
The parish elects a parish council. It is in the area of Wiltshire Council, a unitary authority, which is responsible for all significant local government functions.

== Churches ==
=== Parish church ===
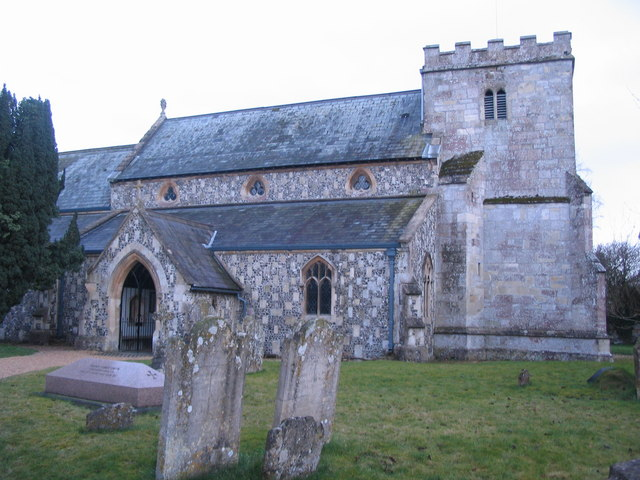
St Mary's Church, Shrewton

The Church of England parish church of St Mary, on the High Street, was built in the late 12th or early 13th century and has a 16th-century west tower. During restoration and enlargement in 1855 by T. H. Wyatt, the north porch was added, and the chancel, nave arcades and south aisle rebuilt; fragments of 12th-century work survive in some of the arcade pillars. Wyatt also replaced the nave roof, raising it with a clerestory, which is criticised by Pevsner as having "dwarfed the tower".

Three of the six bells were cast in 1619. The Romanesque-style font by Wyatt is described as "especially good" by Historic England. The building, in flint and limestone ashlar, was recorded as Grade II* listed in 1958.

The benefices of Shrewton and Maddington were united in 1869 and Rollestone was added in 1923, but the three parishes remained distinct until 1970. Today the church is part of the Salisbury Plain Benefice.

=== Maddington ===
St Mary's Church in the Maddington part of the parish was built in the late 12th century. It is also Grade II* listed and is now in the care of the Churches Conservation Trust. The church has Norman origins, belonging to Amesbury Priory in 1179, with the earliest parts of the existing building dating from the late 12th and early 13th century, although there have been several alterations since, including the renewal of the roof of the nave in 1603. Sir Stephen Fox became the lord of the manor in the late 17th century and paid for the rebuilding of the chancel and redecoration. In 1853 the chancel was rebuilt and the whole church restored by T. H. Wyatt, including the erection of the gabled porch. The walls of the nave and chancel have a chequerboard pattern of flint and sandstone. There is a low west tower. The interior includes a large plaster cartouche of strapwork enclosing the date 1637, which may the date of construction of a gallery which has since been demolished. The stained glass includes work by Alexander Gibbs in the south aisle. The church was declared redundant in 1975 and passed to the Redundant Churches Fund in 1979 which later became the Churches Conservation Trust.

=== Rollestone ===
St Andrew's Church in the Rollestone settlement was built in the early 13th century. A Grade II* listed building, it is now in the care of the Churches Conservation Trust. The church is built of flint and stone in a chequerwork pattern. It has two large Perpendicular windows, and a font from the 13th century. The oak benches were brought from the redundant church of St Catherine’s at Haydon, Dorset in 1981.

== Other buildings ==
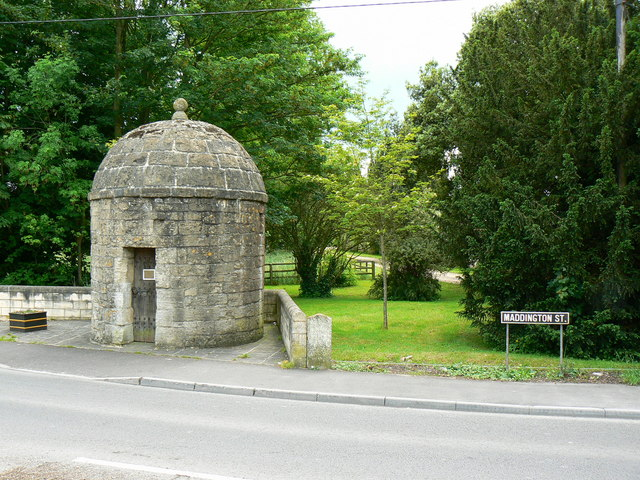
The Blind House, the village lock-up; to its right is an 18th-century milestone

Shrewton Manor, on the High Street, is a 17th-century house in limestone and flint, with extensions built in the early 19th and early 20th centuries. Next to the bridge over the Till is a domed village lock-up called The Blind House, dressed limestone, built around 1700. The sign on it reads "The Blind House. Village criminals were kept in this 18th Century prison".

Shrewton House, northeast of the village, is a country house of c.1830.

== Amenities ==
The village has a primary school, Shrewton CE VC Primary School. Appleford School, an independent specialist dyslexia school, is near the village.

The whole length of the River Till is a Site of Special Scientific Interest.

Shrewton has a Non-League football club, Shrewton United F.C., who play at the Recreation Ground. The village also has a cricket club who play in the Hampshire League.

== Notable people ==
Cecil Chubb (1876–1934), barrister and landowner who in 1918 donated Stonehenge to the nation, was born at Shrewton.
