= Byne House =

House in Warminster, Wiltshire, England

Coordinates: 51°12′23″N 2°11′20″W

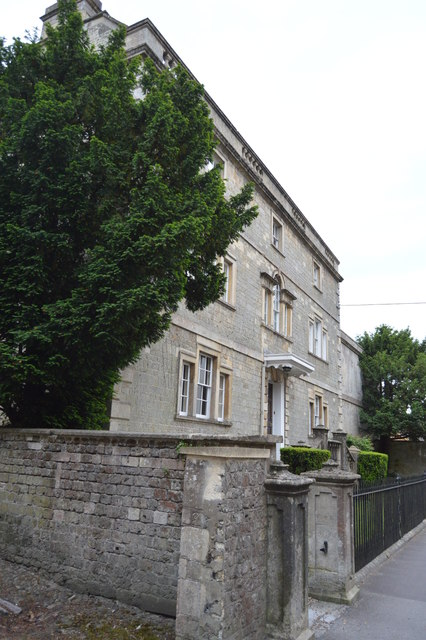

Byne House is a Grade II* listed house at 40 Church Street, Warminster, Wiltshire, England. It was built in 1755 for the clothier John Wansey, and is an example of the wealth that accrued to the area from the wool industry. It was later the home of the headmaster of Warminster School. The house was badly damaged by fire in 2007. The 19th-century railings outside the house are Grade II listed.
