= Rollestone =

Village in Wiltshire, England

Coordinates: 51.188°N 1.901°W

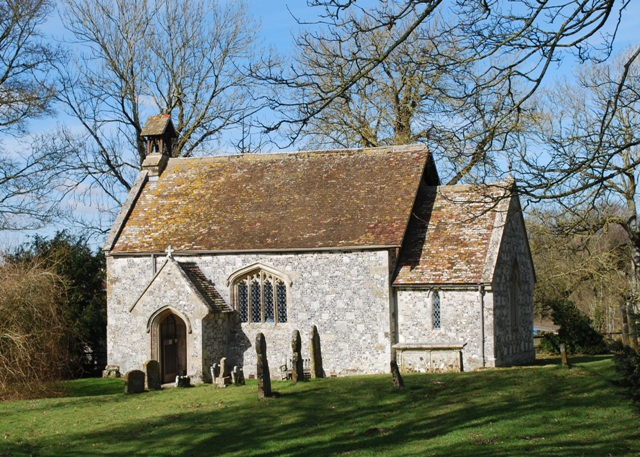
- St Andrew's Church, Rollestone

- Location within Wiltshire
- OS grid reference: SU072432
- Civil parish: Shrewton
- Unitary authority: Wiltshire
- Ceremonial county: Wiltshire
- Region: South West
- Country: England
- Sovereign state: United Kingdom
- Post town: SALISBURY
- Postcode district: SP3
- Dialling code: 01980
- Police: Wiltshire
- Fire: Dorset and Wiltshire
- Ambulance: South Western
- UK Parliament: East Wiltshire

Rollestone is a small village and former civil parish, now in the parish of Shrewton, on Salisbury Plain, in Wiltshire, England. It is near the River Till. Its nearest town is Amesbury, about 5 miles (8.0 km) away to the east.

In 1931 the parish had a population of 189. On 1 April 1934 the parish was abolished and merged with Shrewton.

== History ==
The name Rollestone was first used in the 13th century.

In 1947 the Ordnance Survey map showed Rollestone as a hamlet south of the A360 Devizes to Salisbury road, about 0.5 miles (0.80 km) southeast of Shrewton. As Shrewton expanded in the 20th century, Rollestone became an area of Shrewton.

Rollestone Manor was built in the 18th century and is Grade II listed. As of 2015 it is a privately owned hotel and restaurant.

== Church ==
The small 13th-century Anglican Church of St Andrew is Grade II* listed. It was declared redundant and is in the care of the Churches Conservation Trust.

Near the church is the former rectory, a mid-17th-century building altered in the 19th century.

== Rollestone Camp ==
Military usage of land to the northeast of Rollestone began in the early 20th century, as artillery firing ranges which were later used by the Royal School of Artillery at Larkhill Camp.

Rollestone Camp was established in 1916 by the Royal Flying Corps for observation balloon training. Situated in an upland area of Wiltshire, it was described by one soldier stationed there as 'a bit bleak', especially for Australians used to a warmer climate. The water froze around Christmas time, and one night the troops' corrugated iron cinema was blown away.

Around this time the Amesbury and Military Camp Light Railway was extended from Larkhill to Rollestone and beyond; this extension remained in use until about 1923. Balloon-related usage of Rollestone Camp continued until 1939 when the site became a Royal Air Force Anti-Gas School, which closed in 1945.

For several months in 1980–1981 the camp was used as a temporary prison (HMP Rollestone Camp) during industrial action by prison officers.

For eight months in 1988, the camp became HMP Rollestone once more when it was used to relieve overcrowding in civilian prisons. The prison housed 360 category C prisoners. The prison governor was a HMP graded officer, the wing commanders were Military Provost staff (from Colchester military prison) and the wing staff were Royal Military Police NCOs, provided by the local Provost companies in nearby Tidworth and Bulford.

The camp continues in use as part of the Salisbury Plain Training Area.
