= Leigh Delamere =

Village in Wiltshire, England

Coordinates: 51.512°N 2.168°W

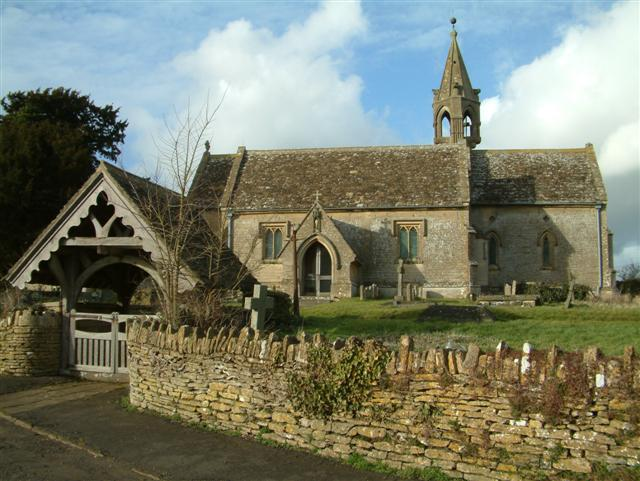
- St Margaret of Antioch Church

- Location within Wiltshire
- Civil parish: Grittleton
- Unitary authority: Wiltshire
- Ceremonial county: Wiltshire
- Region: South West
- Country: England
- Sovereign state: United Kingdom
- Post town: Chippenham
- Postcode district: SN14
- Dialling code: 01249
- Police: Wiltshire
- Fire: Dorset and Wiltshire
- Ambulance: South Western
- UK Parliament: South Cotswolds

Leigh Delamere is a small village in the civil parish of Grittleton in the English county of Wiltshire, about 4 miles (6 km) northwest of the town of Chippenham. The M4 motorway passes some 250 metres to the south, and the motorway's Leigh Delamere services lie to the east of the village.

The civil parish of Leigh Delamere (which included the hamlet of Sevington, about one mile southwest of the village) was absorbed by Grittleton parish on 1 April 1934. In 1931 the parish had a population of 96.

== Buildings ==
The village comprises a church, a former farm, eight almshouses and eight houses.

The rebuilding of the church (1846) and the construction of the Tudor-style row of almshouses (1848) were at the expense of Joseph Neeld, who bought the Grittleton estate in 1828 after inheriting a large sum. In both cases the architect was James Thomson, who also worked on the rectory (1846, also in Tudor style) and Grittleton House (from 1832).

Manor Farmhouse is from the 17th century, with alterations for Neeld in 1842. A separate large barn is from the 18th or early 19th century.

== St Margaret's Church ==
St Margaret's Church was built on the site of a previous 12th-century church in 1846 and dedicated to Margaret the Virgin. It has been designated as a Grade II* listed building and is now in the care of the Churches Conservation Trust.

== Bybrook benefice ==
The benefices of Leigh Delamere and Grittleton were united in 1924. In the 1990s the benefices of Biddestone with Slaughterford, Castle Combe, Grittleton and Leigh Delamere, Nettleton and Burton with Littleton Drew, West Kington and Yatton Keynell were united to form the Bybrook benefice; North Wraxall joined at a later date. The benefice is part of the Chippenham Deanery in the Diocese of Bristol.
