= George and Dragon, Salisbury =

Pub in Salisbury, Wiltshire, England

Coordinates: 51°04′20″N 1°47′47″W

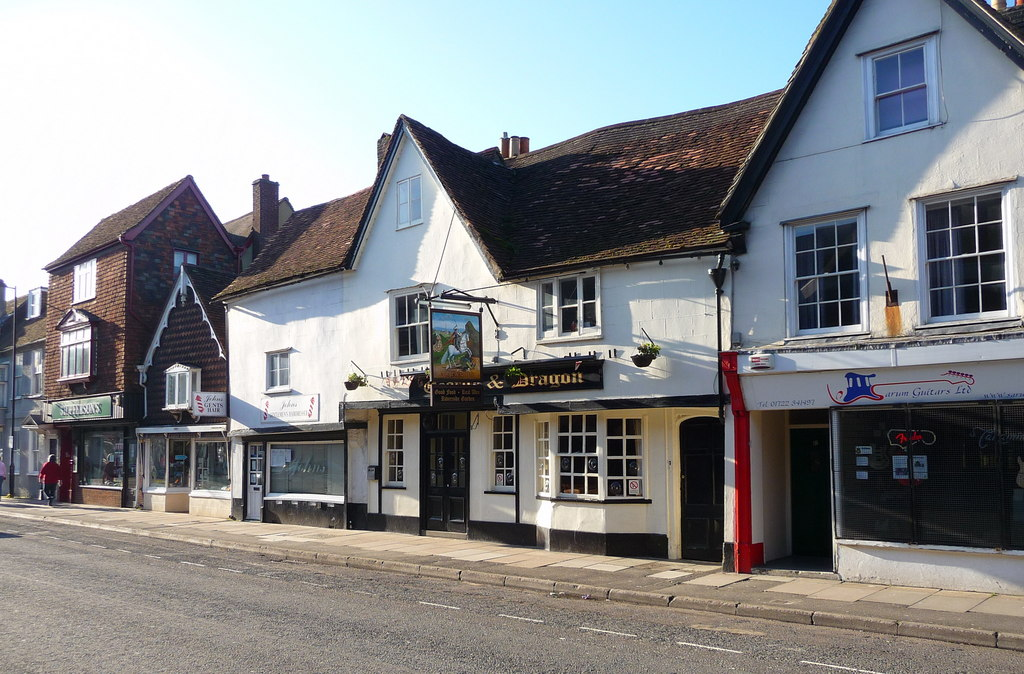
The George and Dragon

The George and Dragon is a Grade II* listed public house in Castle Street, Salisbury, Wiltshire, England, which dates from the sixteenth century.
