= St Mary's Church, Maddington =

St Mary's Church
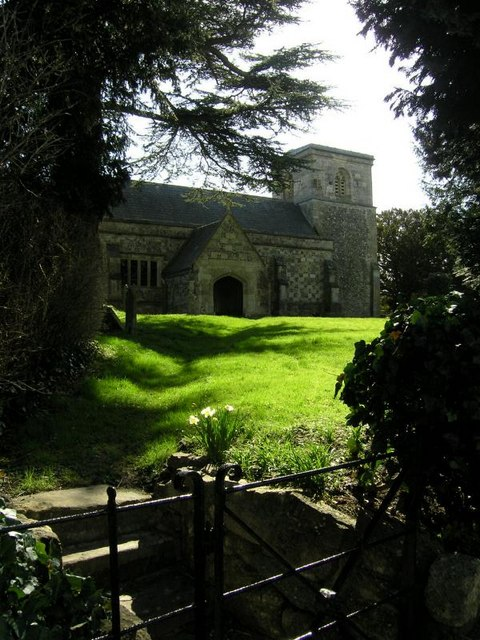

- Location within Wiltshire
- 51.1932°N 1.9055°W
- Location: Maddington, Shrewton, Wiltshire, England

History
- Built: late 12th century

Listed Building – Grade II*
- Official name: Church of St Mary the Virgin
- Designated: 18 February 1958
- Reference no.: 1023996

St Mary's Church in the Maddington area of Shrewton, Wiltshire, in the west of England, was built in the late 12th century. It is recorded in the National Heritage List for England as a designated Grade II* listed building, and is now a redundant church in the care of the Churches Conservation Trust. It was declared redundant on 29 December 1975, and was vested in the Trust on 26 July 1979.

The church has Norman origins, belonging to Amesbury Priory in 1179, with the earliest parts of the existing building dating from the late 12th and early 13th century. Later alterations included the renewal of the roof of the nave in 1603, funded by Giles Tooker. Sir Stephen Fox became the lord of the manor in the late 17th century and paid for the rebuilding of the chancel and redecoration. A gallery was added in 1637 but has since been removed. In 1853 the chancel was rebuilt and the whole church restored by Thomas Henry Wyatt, including the erection of the gabled porch.

The walls of the nave and chancel have a chequerboard pattern of flint and sandstone. There is a low west three-stage tower, which was added in the 16th century and is supported by diagonal buttresses. The three bells are dated c.1499, 1587 and 1699 and are currently unringable. The interior includes a large plaster cartouche of strapwork enclosing the date 1637, which may be the date of construction of the gallery which has since been demolished. The stained glass includes work by Alexander Gibbs in the south aisle and another by Lavers, Barraud and Westlake in the chancel.

Part of a flint and limestone wall, northwest of the church, is from the 17th century. The churchyard has an extension west of the main churchyard, across a footpath, which contains Commonwealth war graves of a Canadian Army soldier of World War I and a Dorsetshire Regiment soldier of World War II. Also here is the grave of Vladimir Pasechnik (1937–2001), a Soviet scientist who worked on biological weapons before defecting to the UK in 1989.

== See also ==
- List of churches preserved by the Churches Conservation Trust in Southwest England
