= St Margaret of Antioch Church, Leigh Delamere =

Church in Wiltshire, England

St Margaret of Antioch Church
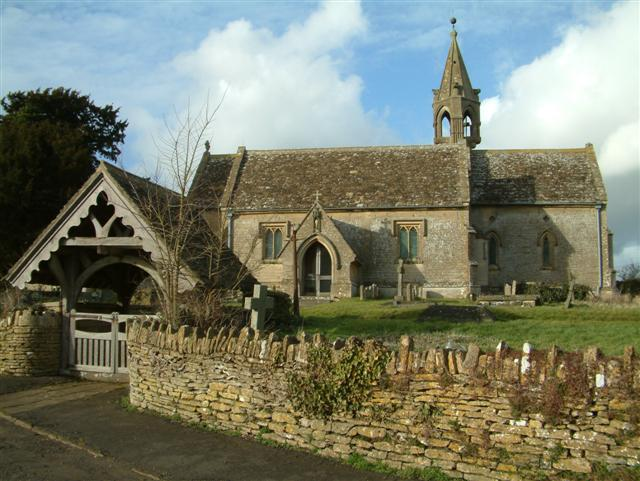

- Location within Wiltshire
- 51°30′44″N 2°10′04″W
- Location: Leigh Delamere, Wiltshire, England

History
- Built: 1846

Site notes
- Architect: James Thomson
- Architectural style: Gothic revival

Listed Building – Grade II*
- Official name: Church of St Margaret
- Designated: 20 December 1960
- Reference no.: 1022289

St Margaret of Antioch Church in Leigh Delamere, Wiltshire, England was built on the site of a previous 12th-century church in 1846 and dedicated to Margaret the Virgin. It is recorded in the National Heritage List for England as a Grade II* listed building, and is now a redundant church in the care of the Churches Conservation Trust. It was declared redundant on 1 November 1992, and was vested in the Trust on 16 December 1993.

The previous church had been built around 1190, in an Early English style with Norman features. In 1301 the patron of the church was John De la Mare. By 1846 the church was in a dilapidated condition and it would have cost more to repair than rebuild. The new church was commissioned by Joseph Neeld and designed by James Thomson, who also designed the nearby Grittleton House. Stonework from the earlier church, including the bell tower, was reused by Thomson to build Sevington School.

The Gothic chancel includes a reredos which is carved and decorated in many colours. The west window has stained glass by Thomas Wilmshurst. There are many memorials including those to the Neeld Baronets.

A new organ was installed in 1896, and electricity supplied in 1949, although attendance by this time was very low. The building was designated as Grade II* listed in 1960, and the roadside lychgate as Grade II in 1988. In the 21st century a 15th-century stone rood which had been hidden under the pews was restored by Minerva Conservation and placed in the chancel.

In 2016 the church was used as a venue for "pop-up" opera with a performance of The Barber of Seville.

== See also ==
- List of churches preserved by the Churches Conservation Trust in South West England
