= Yarnbury =

Yarnbury may refer to:

- The location of a hillfort with outworks called Yarnbury Castle, near Steeple Langford in Wiltshire, England
- Yarnbury Lead Mines, to the north of Grassington in North Yorkshire, England
- Yarnbury, a life peerage of the United Kingdom held by several members of the Bonham Carter family
