= Ground crew =

Personnel that service aircraft while on the ground

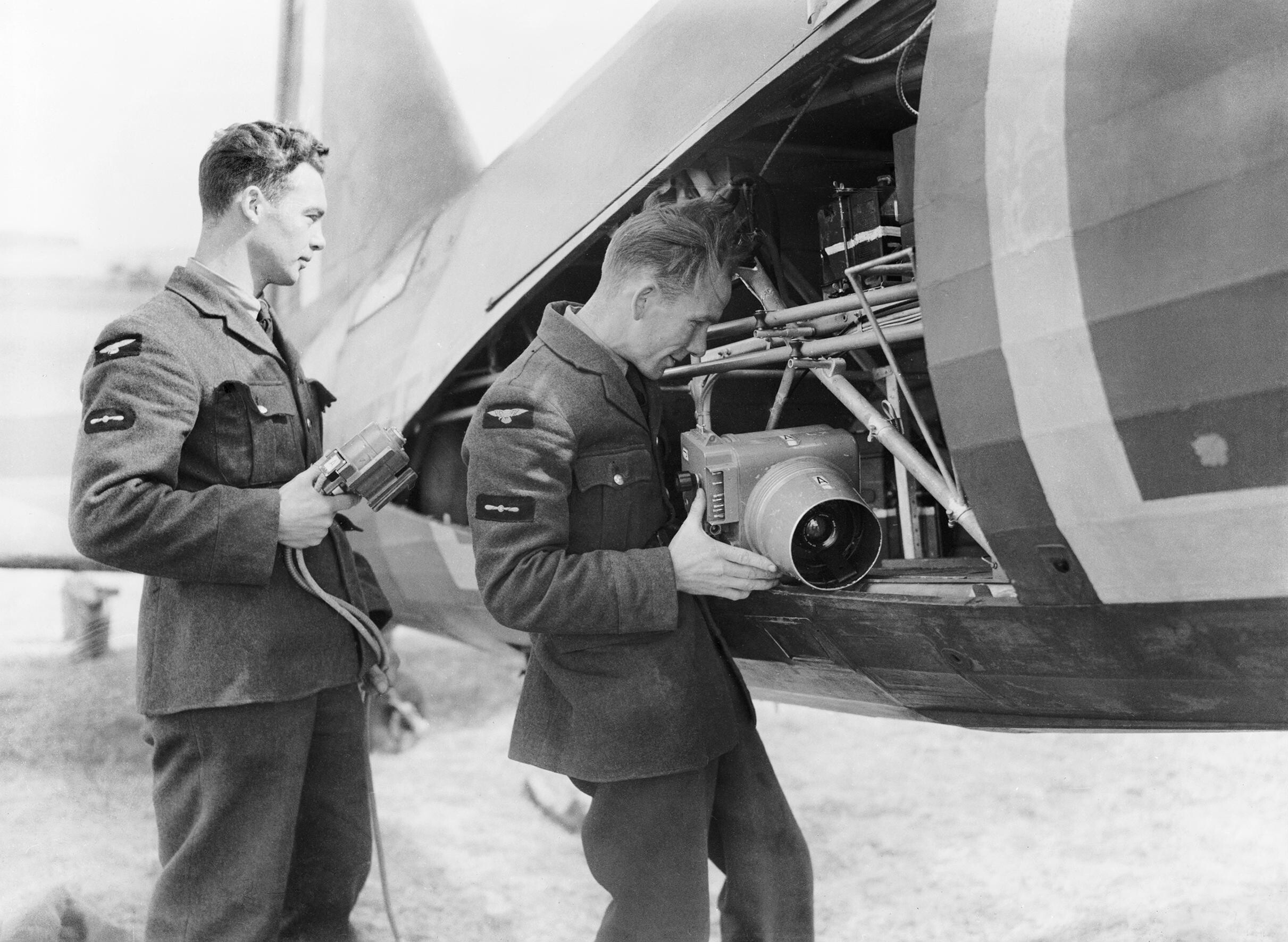
Two Royal Air Force ground crew installing a camera into a Westland Lysander Mk II of No. 225 Squadron at RAF Tilshead, Wiltshire, September 1940. Both men, of leading aircraftman rank, wear parade dress, which suggests the photo was taken during an official station inspection. More typically, ground crew would wear heavy duty working dress.

In all forms of aviation, ground crew (also known as ground operations in civilian aviation) are personnel that service aircraft while on the ground, during routine turn-around; as opposed to aircrew, who operate all aspects of an aircraft whilst in flight. The term ground crew is used by both civilian commercial airlines and in military aviation.

== Aircraft ground crew ==
Dependent on the type of aircraft being operated, airline ground crew members typically include: airframe technicians, engine technicians, avionics technicians.

=== Military aircraft ===
Military aircraft equipped with either weapons and / or an ejector seat will also require a dedicated weapons technician ground crew member.

=== Non-powered flight ===
Ground crew required for non-powered flight, such as gliders will include people who manually handle the glider aircraft from their storage location, such as an aircraft hangar, to their respective launch site, and then return them at the end of flying. Aero-towed launched gliders will require ground crew commensurate with supporting the tow aircraft, which are typically single piston-engined general aviation (GA) small lightweight utility variants, often Cessna.

For winch-launched gliders, ground crew will also include the winch-launch operator(s), and also a pay-out vehicle operator whose purpose is to draw or pay-out the winch launch cables (usually two cables per launch vehicle) which will be located at the far end of the upwind side of the airfield, to the gliders awaiting their turn to launch at the opposite end of the airfield.

=== Non-controlled flight ===
Hot-air balloons require particularly unique ground crew. Their roles include preparing the passenger basket (or gondola) with the correct amount of pressurized gas for the burners, testing of the burners, calculating the total mass of the balloon pilot and all passengers, calculating and applying appropriate ballast weight (fixed internal and releasable external). Then the assembly of the passenger basket to its lift balloon envelope, laying out the balloon envelope fabric in a manner that facilitates efficient inflation.

Prior to launch, it will require personnel to 'waft' the balloon envelope during horizontal burner operation, to ensure an efficient fill. When the balloon envelope is itself airborne, but still not able to lift the basket with its pilot and any passengers, the ground crew will be required to hold ground tug ropes, to maintain the correct position of the balloon over the now vertically firing burner, and to prevent the basket from being uncontrollably dragged along the ground, until the balloon is totally full and capable of launch.

Once in flight, the hot air balloon ground crew drive one or more 'chase vehicles', initially to follow the progress and trajectory of the balloon in flight as best it can. Most hot air balloons have zero aviation-specific navigation aids, though modern pilots will typically utilize satellite navigation features found on many smartphones, along with the mobile voice telephony to maintain contact with the chase vehicle. The final task of the chase vehicle will be to locate and attend the balloon landing site, to repatriate any passengers back to their respective location, and to thoroughly deflate the balloon envelope, then correctly fold and stow away the envelope, along with the basket, and deliver all balloon equipment and its pilot back to their preferred location.

== Airport ground crew ==
Time-lapse (tilt-shifted) of airport ground crew operating ground support equipment at Osaka International Airport.

Ground crew who are employed by the individual airport include personnel who are tasked to do the following operations: aircraft fueling suppliers, toilet effluent tank extraction operatives, interior cabin cleaners, aircraft exterior de-icing operatives, on-board food delivery suppliers (for crew and passengers), baggage, cargo and / or freight handlers (for loading and offloading into the lower hold), ramp agents and boarding gate operatives, flight dispatchers, and even customer service agents, may also loosely be described as ground crew.

Other typical airport ground crew include personnel who are responsible for regular routine sweeping of all operational runways, runway exits and hold points, taxiways, hardstanding (parking) areas, and passenger terminal areas, including sky-bridges or gates; for clearing of any general and typical debris or garbage. Most commonly collected on runways is tyre debris, and wind-blown dirt, sand, earth, grass, from ambient winds, and from the vortices generated by the aerodynamic elements of an aircraft at speed, along with engine induction and jet exhaust thrust. This is absolutely critical to safe airport operations, as it the major process used to prevent foreign object damage (FOD), whereby a foreign object could sucked into an aircraft engine, or cut and puncture aircraft tyres.

On military facilities, ground crew members are tasked with daily FOD walks, or 'FOD plods', whereby a team of people will fan out in a line across the entire width of the runway, and walk the length of the entire active runway, to visually inspect the runway surface, and its immediate environs, to look for and removes any items or 'foreign objects' found; this is typically done in the morning, prior to the first despatch of an aircraft for that day.

Virtually all airports which cater for large aircraft will have a fleet of pushback tugs. Other possible classifications of airport ground crews may include airport shuttle bus drivers, airport firefighters, first aid and qualified medical services, police (often armed in these days of high risks of potential terrorist attacks), and general guard and security services. Airports with international connections will also have passport control agents, border, customs and immigration force officers.

Many airports also have a live animal reception centre, staffed by vets, veterinary nurses, and administrators; for the purposes of checking animal health and welfare, along with correct documentation such as permits to fly, pet passports, etc., and will also be responsible for the prevention of importing any illegal, prohibited, or endangered species of animal.

Dependent on geographic location, airport ground crew may employ winter service vehicles, specifically snow clearance vehicles, including fleets of multiple sweepers, ploughs, and snow blowers. Ground de-icing operatives may be used, whereby one or more vehicles, similar to an agricultural crop sprayer with fold-out extendible boom arms is used to spray a non-corrosive aircraft-safe de-icing fluid onto all operational hard surfaces, to melt any existing surface ice, and prevent the formation of new ice during the certified operating hours of the airport. Teams of avian dispersal agents, commonly known as 'bird scarers' will be utilised to clear any birds, especially along the entire length runway, and also on the runway approach glide-paths, and runway departure paths.

=== Military airport ===
For military airbases which operate (or may be required to operate) armed aircraft, i.e., those aircraft capable of carrying explosive ordnance, or rapid-fire canons; an extremely specific ground crew role is the weapons technician.

== Chemical exposures of ground crew ==
=== Fuel exposure ===
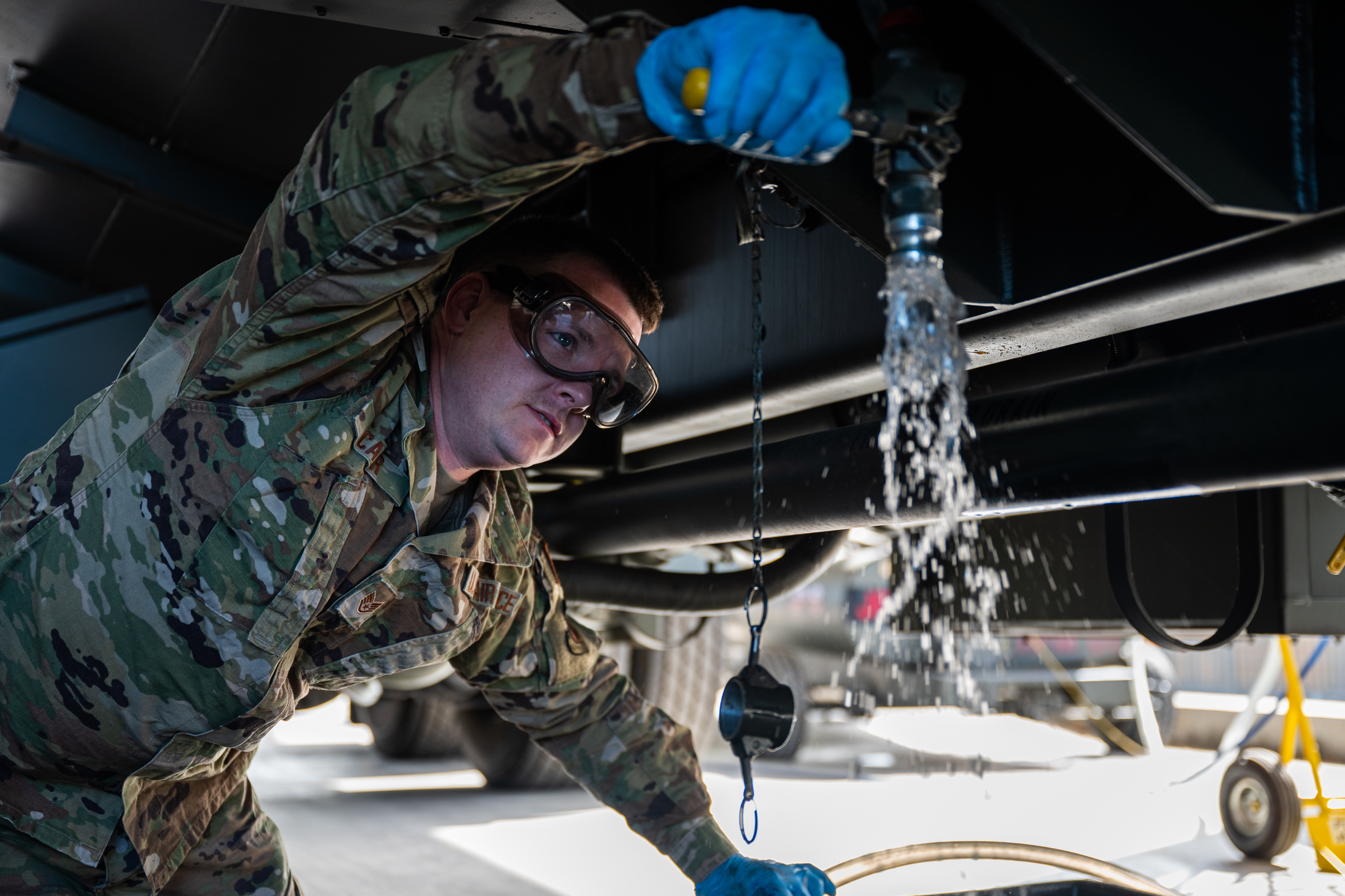
United States Airforce Airman defueling an aircraft refueling truck.

While only certain airport ground crew are responsible for the refueling of aircraft, other tasks that involve working near aircraft can expose ground crew workers to chemicals produced by fuels used in airports. These fuels include jet fuel used in commercial (Jet-A-A1 fuels) or military (JP-8 fuel) aircraft, as well as diesel and gasoline fuels used for other airport vehicles, such as baggage trolleys and runway shuttles. The combustion and vapors of these fuels can increase exposures to chemical mixtures including several polycyclic aromatic hydrocarbons (PAHs) such as naphthalene, fluoranthene, and pyrene.

While occupational exposure of ground crew workers to these chemicals is generally below permissible limits identified by the US Occupational Safety and Health Administration (OSHA) for similar compounds, these toxicants can still pose health risks to workers if proper safety precautions are not taken. Ground crew responsible for fuel and maintenance in airports may be exposed to jet fuels through the skin if not wearing chemical-resistant personal protective equipment (PPE) such as eyewear, footwear, gloves, and clothes; as well as through inhalation of aircraft exhaust or vapors.

Prolonged exposure of JP-8 can result in sensitization, contact dermatitis, and eye and respiratory tract irritation. In-vitro studies on the effects of Jet-A fuel exposure have shown it to be DNA-damaging, a neurotoxin and immunotoxin, as well as a respiratory irritant.

=== Aerosol and vapor exposure ===
Certain ground crew may also be responsible for aircraft maintenance. This may include tasks such as repairing and maintaining aircraft hydraulic systems and engines, and replacing turbine and hydraulic oils. Ground crew may be exposed to harmful compounds and chemicals present in hydraulic oils and lubricants, especially when performing maintenance tasks near heated and pressurized systems with a higher potential to generate hazardous oil aerosols and vapors, as most of these mineral and synthetic oils contain additives such as organophosphates.

Ground crew handling luggage in close proximity to aircraft may also be exposed to turbine oil aerosols, vapors, and leaks from engine tail pipes. Organophosphate exposure has been associated with several neurological, psychiatric, and neurobehavioral syndromes. While the levels of organophosphate exposures during these tasks is generally low, higher exposures may occur during outstanding circumstances such as leaks.

=== Prevention and control methods ===
In terms of mitigating exposures to the various chemicals used by airport ground crew, workplaces may utilize NIOSH's hierarchy of controls, which establishes the most to least effective actions to take to control workplace hazards. While the most effective action taken to control chemical hazards is to eliminate the hazard entirely, it may not be realistic to entirely eliminate the use of certain jet fuels and other chemicals used in the aviation industry, as they are widely used and readily available.

Therefore, reducing exposures to chemicals for ground crew may rely more on actions such as engineering controls or personal protective equipment (PPE), which can include wearing chemical-resistant PPE such as eyewear, footwear, gloves, and clothes, or installing adequate ventilation in enclosed working spaces such as maintenance hangars to improve air flow and supply when working with certain chemicals.

== Physical hazards of ground crew ==
Airport ground crew covers a wide variety of tasks, from baggage carrying, to refueling, to food restocking, to docking and guiding planes in taxi, to managing jet bridges and cleaning the interior of planes. The responsibilities of ground crew can cause a wide variety of work-related musculoskeletal disorders, or WMSDs. Ground crew WMSDs account for a large portion of Washington state's WMSDs, and resulted in 870 cases between 2018 and 2022. The rate for work-related musculoskeletal disorders among ground crew is 10 times the rate of the state average for WMSDs across all occupational fields in the state.

=== Musculoskeletal hazards ===
Injuries in this field most often happen due to overexertion and repetitive movement. Regular lifting of heavy baggage using the same muscles can result in muscle strain, joint and tendon damage, carpal tunnel syndrome, dislocations, and rheumatism in the back. Ground crew are expected to bend down, crawl, twist into tight spaces, and stand for long periods of time.

=== Physical and environmental hazards ===
There are a variety of physical and environmental hazards. Burn injuries can occur due to exposure to heat and electrical sources. Moving parts throughout the tarmac can cause tripping hazards. Unsecured equipment can come loose and cause crush injuries to ground crew. Weather heat can pose a risk to heat stroke, sunburn, and dehydration. Freezing temperatures in the winter months may increase slipping hazards and frostbite.

=== Prevention and control methods ===
Prevention of the variety of occupational hazards ground crews face requires continuous proper training, safety features, and proper PPE. When it comes to managing occupational hazards, NIOSH established the hierarchy of controls, a framework to mediate the dangers based on what is most to least effective. In order of most to least effective, the order of things is elimination, substitution, engineering controls, administrative controls, and lastly personal protective equipment. This puts the responsibility for safety on people higher up rather than the worker, in addition to decreasing the likelihood for human error.

At the elimination level, Washington State recently launched a new ergonomics law in 2024 to develop new safety measures and requirements. Lawmakers evaluated data on the rates of injuries among ground crew. A replacement method to minimize occupation hazards for people lifting and moving baggage includes vacuum lifting. Vacuum lifting assist on baggage carriers can reduce weight by 90% and a 63% percent reduction in compressive lower back force.

== Hearing loss in ground crew ==
=== Risks of hearing disorders ===
The duties of the ground crew include an array of tasks ranging from handling and transportation of cargo to maintenance of aircraft mechanics, including pushback and towing, ramp alignment, connection to power, and overall ground support, allowing for smooth, safe flight operations. Because their work requires them to spend extended periods of time on the tarmac, exposed to loud equipment and large aircraft, ground crew are at a higher risk of Noise-Induced Hearing Loss (NIHL).

NIHL can manifest either immediately or over long periods of time as noise exposure accumulates, and can affect one's ears to various severities. Symptoms of NIHL include, but are not limited to, ear pressure or a feeling of fullness, occluded or distorted speech recognition and comprehension, and trouble hearing sounds above certain pitches, often between 3000 and 6000 hertz (Hz).

=== Common risk factors ===
Ground crew members face several common risk factors that may increase their likelihood of developing NIHL.

The Occupational Safety and Health Administration (OSHA) sets an 85 decibel (dB) standard for the levels of noise that an individual can be exposed to over the course of 8 hours a day over the 40-hour standard workweek. This is known as the time-weighted average (TWA), which must lie within the permissible exposure limit (PEL), or the highest level of exposure with negligible, negative health impacts, which can be dangerous if exceeded.

During takeoff and landing procedures, and other engine-related malfunctions, noise levels can reach up to 140 dB(A). A dB(A) is the weighted measurement used to determine human perception of a decibel, and at 140 dB(A), pain can be intense, as it is past the 120 dB unweighted threshold for experienced ear pain.

Long-term exposure to intense noise, without hearing protection, can lead to adverse health outcomes such as auditory disruptions through limited or lost hearing in certain ranges, ringing in the ear known as tinnitus, and even impaired speech. In severe cases, there have been associations between prolonged exposure to loud noise and its impact on cardiovascular health. Since prolonged and repeated exposure to sound levels over the set 85 dB threshold is dangerous, it is understood that noise exposure is a major occupational hazard for airline ground crew. This risk of adverse auditory effects is especially heightened when coupled with cumulative exposure, such as repeatedly experiencing unsafe decibels, and when individuals do not adhere to proper use of hearing protection devices (HPDs), such as earplugs, earmuffs, and headphones.

=== Prevention and control methods ===
When it comes to the prevention of NIHL in the workplace, employers play a major role in reducing noise exposure through the hierarchy of controls.

Employers and managers can ensure thorough equipment maintenance to minimize unnecessary noise, limit loud machinery usage when possible, and redesign workflows to reduce employee time spent with major sources of noise. Additionally, under OSHA's hearing protection program, it is necessary that employers provide annual hearing assessments and personal protective equipment (PPE) to employees experiencing excessive noise exposure.

At a personal level, one of the best measures employees can individually take to prevent or mitigate NIHL is to appropriately wear properly fitting HPDs. When it comes to wearing HPDs, a proper fit and selection of the device are critical to their efficacy, as their noise reduction properties decrease due to an ill fit. The National Institute for Occupational Health and Safety (NIOSH) recommends individualized testing, aimed to quantitatively adjust HPD performance to each employee's hearing threshold, delivering them a personal attenuation rating (PAR) to decipher their device's efficacy. Proper-fitting HPDs, coupled with regular hearing tests for early detection of hearing loss, are essential, as timely intervention can be implemented before permanent damage occurs.

== See also ==
- Ground support equipment
- Aircraft maintenance
- Aircraft maintenance checks
- Aircraft maintenance engineer
- Aircraft maintenance technician
- Airworthiness
