= River Till, Wiltshire =

River in Wiltshire, England

River Till
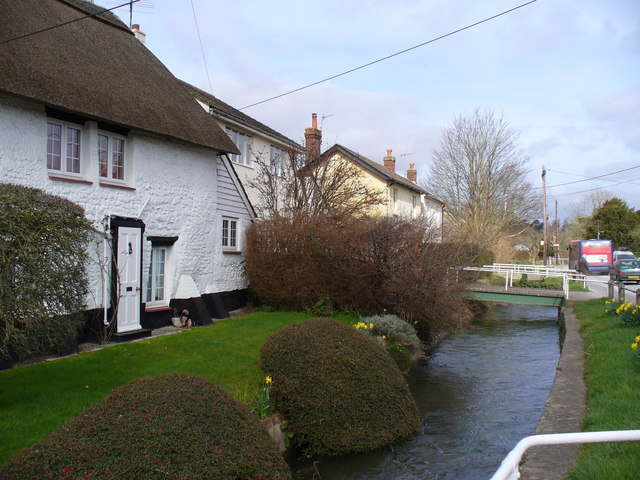
- River Till at Shrewton

Location
- Country: United Kingdom
- Country within the UK: England
- Counties: Wiltshire

Physical characteristics
- Source
  - location: Tilshead
  - coordinates: 51°13′49″N 1°57′21″W
- Mouth
  - location: Stapleford, Wiltshire
  - coordinates: 51°08′09″N 1°54′07″W
- Length: 14 km (8.7 mi)

The River Till is a chalk stream that rises near Tilshead on Salisbury Plain in the English county of Wiltshire. It flows for about 14 km (9 miles) south and south-east, through Orcheston, Maddington, Shrewton, Winterbourne Stoke, Berwick St James and Stapleford, to join the River Wylye.

The upper part of the river is a winterbourne, flowing only in winter and early spring. The whole length of the Till has been designated as a Site of Special Scientific Interest, as its vegetation includes water crowfoot which provides habitat for fish and snails.

Although Tilshead village appears to be named from the river, the opposite applies. The village name was first used in the 16th century, and comes from older names based on "Theodwulf's hide" (recorded in Domesday Book as Tidolthide). The river was called the Winterbourne until around the start of the 20th century, when the name River Till began to be used on Ordnance Survey maps.

== Water quality ==
The Environment Agency measures the water quality of the river systems in England. Each is given an overall ecological status, which may be one of five levels: high, good, moderate, poor and bad. There are several components that are used to determine this, including biological status, which looks at the quantity and varieties of invertebrates, angiosperms and fish. Chemical status, which compares the concentrations of various chemicals against known safe concentrations, is rated good or fail.

Water quality of the River Till in 2019:

| Section | Ecological Status | Chemical Status | Overall Status | Length | Catchment | Channel |
|---|---|---|---|---|---|---|
| Till (Hampshire Avon) | Good | Fail | Moderate | 13.993 km (8.695 mi) | 127.785 km^{2} (49.338 sq mi) | |
