= Scratchbury Camp =

Iron Age hillfort in Wiltshire, England

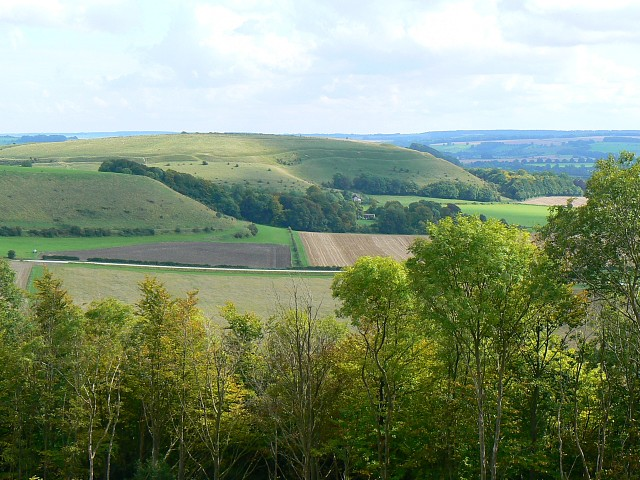
- Scratchbury Camp, viewed from Battlesbury Hill

- Location within Wiltshire
- 51.1973°N 2.1274°W
- Type: Univallate hillfort
- Periods: Bronze Age, Iron Age
- Associated with: Belgae
- Location: Wiltshire
- Region: Southern England

Site notes
- Material: Chalk
- Area: 37 acres (15 ha)
- Excavation dates: 1810, 1930, 1957, 1991
- Archaeologists: E.C.Curwen; W.F.Grimes; William Cunnington; Sir Richard Colt Hoare
- Condition: good
- Public access: footpaths

Identifiers
- NHLE: 1010213

Scheduled monument
- Official name: Scratchbury Hill Monuments

Scratchbury Camp is the site of an Iron Age univallate hillfort on Scratchbury Hill, overlooking the Wylye valley about 1 km northeast of the village of Norton Bavant in Wiltshire, England. The fort covers an area of 37 acres (15 ha) and occupies the summit of the hill on the edge of Salisbury Plain, with its four-sided shape largely following the natural contours of the hill.

The Iron Age hillfort dates to around 100 BC, but contains the remains of an earlier and smaller D-shaped enclosure or camp. The age of this earlier earthwork is currently subject to debate, and has been variously interpreted due to the inconclusive and incomplete nature of previous and differing excavation records; it may be early Iron Age dating to around 250 BC, but it has also been interpreted as being Bronze Age, dating to around 2000 BC.

There are seven tumuli located within the enclosure of the fort, which were excavated in the 19th century by Sir Richard Colt Hoare and William Cunnington. Finds from excavations at that time included relics of bone, pottery, flint, brass, and amber jewellery, most of which can be seen today at the Wiltshire Museum in Devizes. Other items of interest have been found in and around the site including Roman artefacts and neolithic flint and jade axe heads.

The site is listed on Wiltshire Council's Sites and Monuments Record with number ST94SW200, and is also a scheduled monument number SM10213. The hillfort falls within a biological Site of Special Scientific Interest, designated as Scratchbury & Cotley Hills SSSI, which encompasses a total of 53.5 hectares (132 acres), being first SSSI notified in 1951.

== Etymology ==
The name of the hill could be derived from a number of old English words and meanings, the etymology of which are ambiguous and open to interpretation, given the differing sources. One possibility is that the name is derived from the words scratch, an old West Country word for the Devil; and bury, from the Old English word beorg, meaning a mound or hill, or sometimes a defense; although it could also be derived from Crech or Crechen meaning a hill, and burh, meaning a fortified town or a defended site.

== Description ==
=== Iron Age hillfort ===
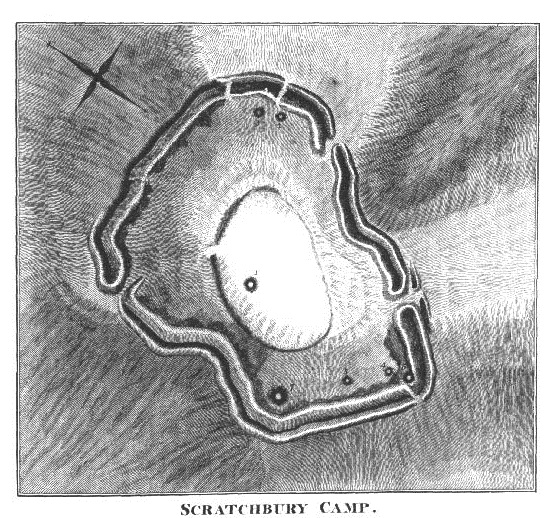
Pencil sketch of Scratchbury camp by Sir Richard Colt-Hoare, 1810. The seven tumuli within the hill fort are also shown.

The steeply contoured sides of Scratchbury Hill form natural defences to the north, west and southwestern sides, and in part to a small area of the eastern flank. Elsewhere on the hill the contours are less steep and afford easier access, with the southeastern boundary merging into the adjacent Cotley Hill with only a small change in level. The Iron Age fortifications at Scratchbury Camp consist of a single large ditch and rampart to the most steeply contoured flanks, with some secondary counterscarps to the more accessible sides. The fort, as measured from the ramparts, has a circumference of 1,846 yd (1,688 m)

The inner earthworks are typical of a "quarry-ditch" formation, whereby the material excavated from the inner ditch is used to create the rampart. Within the quarry ditch numerous curvilinear and circular depressions may represent remains of structures. The fortifications are best preserved on the western side of the hill where the ditch is between 5 and 8 metres (16 and 26 ft) wide and up to 1 metre (3.3 ft) deep. The banks and ditches are generally uneven in height and depth, which is thought to be evidence for a 'gang dug' construction of the earthworks. Elsewhere, the enclosure is defined by a bank 3 to 6 metres (9.8 to 19.7 ft) in height above the ditch bottom, the ditch being 4 to 6 metres (13 to 20 ft) wide and up to 0.5 metres (1.6 ft) deep. On parts of the eastern side of the fort the ditch is absent and is replaced by a ledge of between 3 and 8 metres (9.8 and 26.2 ft) wide. There are two original entrances to the fort on the eastern side, and a possible third on the northwest side. The southeastern entrance has earthwork marks representing possible outer fortifications, and is approached from the adjacent Cotley Hill by a narrow ridge of land referred to as Burberry

Much of the north and west areas of the interior appear to have been densely settled, as demonstrated by the traces of approximately 100 probable structures. These survive mainly as shallow circular hollows of between 5 and 10 metres (16 and 33 ft) in diameter and up to 0.6 metres (2.0 ft) deep. The best preserved is a rectangular platform immediately within the southern terminal of the western entrance. The location and unusual morphology suggests a special function for this structure, and it is perhaps plausible that a 'guard chamber' or sentry was positioned here.

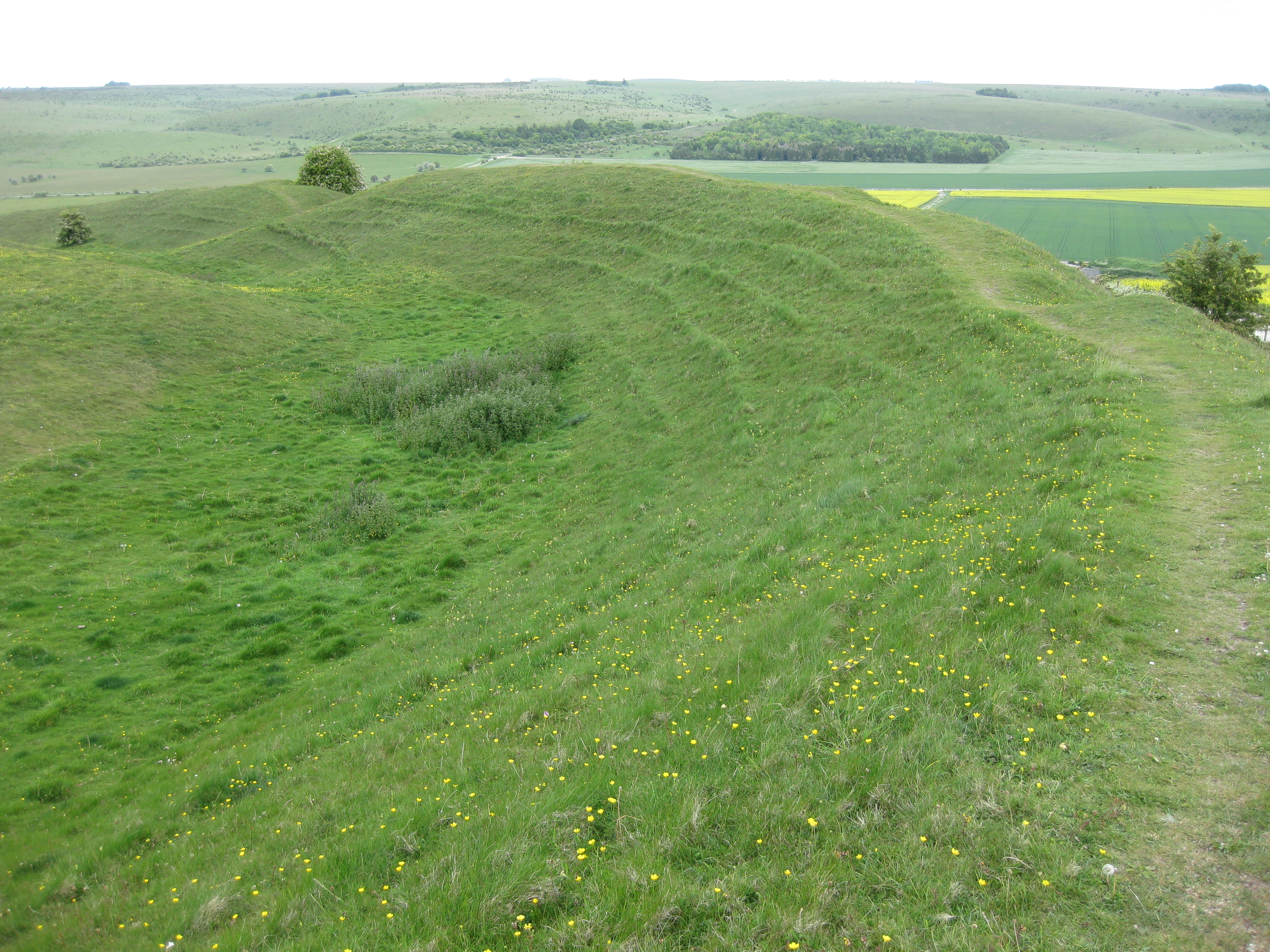
Detail of the northeast flank earthwork defences at Scratchbury Camp

=== Earlier enclosure ===
Within the centre of the hillfort lies the remains of an earlier and smaller D-shaped inner earthwork enclosure of circa 3.5 hectares (8.6 acres), and excavated by E.C.Curwen in 1930. Today, all that really remains of this enclosure is one well defined lynchet of approximately 0.5 metres (1.6 ft) high along the southern section. This feature bears a resemblance to a similar such enclosure at Yarnbury Castle, and was originally interpreted by Curwen to be a Neolithic causewayed enclosure due to its interrupted nature, and the discovery at the site of jade and flint axes.

Subsequent excavations by Grimes in 1957 re-interpreted this feature to be an earlier Iron Age enclosure dating to approximately 250 BC, with Iron Age pottery found within the primary fill. It was therefore speculated that the visible interruptions have been made by post Medieval ploughing. Faint traces of a remnant bank survive along the north and west sections, and an adjoining ditch has a causewayed nature, and survives in short segments varying between 30 and 50 metres (98 and 164 ft) in length. There is also evidence of a single original west facing entrance currently discernible as a 15 metres (49 ft) wide gap in the enclosure boundary. The straight southeastern side of the enclosure is formed by a ditch that is truncated by the main hillfort boundary, and this again has been interpreted as further evidence that the linear ditch and contiguous enclosure pre-date the main hillfort.

However, more recent aerial and photographic surveys have meant that W.F.Grimes' re-interpretation may have been in error. A detailed survey undertaken between 1994 and 1995 by the field survey teams of the Royal Commission on the Historical Monuments of England have suggested that the feature is in fact more likely to be a Neolithic causewayed enclosure as originally interpreted by E.C.Curwen. One possible explanation for the apparent confusion in dating this feature is that Grimes may not have excavated fully to the primary fill. The surveys suggest that the feature clearly has causeways, and low winter sun photography shows that the enclosure continues beyond what was previously believed to be its eastern edge, to form a sub-circular rather than D-shaped enclosure feature. The 'crop mark' visible on aerial photographs shows a continuation of the curve to the southeast of the straight side, thus roughly completing a circle. This feature has also been interpreted as a possible base for a palisaded enclosure. There is also a probable link between the likely neolithic causewayed enclosure and the surrounding barrow cemetery, which would have followed later.

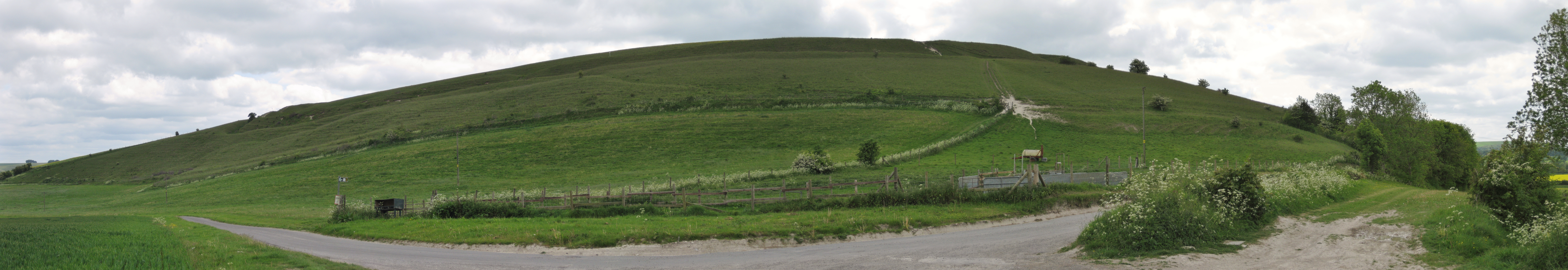
Panoramic view of Scratchbury Hill, as viewed from the northwest. The hillfort earthworks are clearly visible crowning the hill.

=== Later features ===
There is also a Romano-British or later ditch, running east to west, which turns south sharply at the southwest corner of the hillfort, and which partly overlies the earlier Iron Age earthworks. The main ramparts appear to have been built in the 1st century BC.

=== Construction phases ===
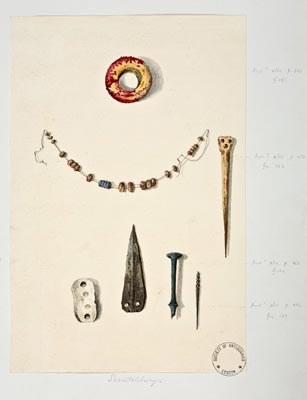
Drawing of finds from the Scratchbury Grave Group, 1869; William Pilsbury after Richard Colt-Hoare (1758–1838); Watercolour on paper, 26.7 x 17.8 (cm); located at the Society of Antiquaries of London

The archaeological evidence suggests that Scratchbury Camp was built in at least two but perhaps three phases. It is generally well accepted that the first phase of construction is defined by the curvilinear portion of the interior D-shaped enclosure, but whether there were distinct second and third Iron Age phases, or merely a re-alignment in the second phase, it is unclear. The scarp subdividing the early fort is a possible indication of a second phase, but this may have been the setting out for a bank that was never utilised. In its third and final phase it seems possible that the fort, having been 'laid out' to include the large barrow, was then further extended to encompass the whole of the top of the hill, to make full defensive use of the natural slopes and resulting in the present day configuration.

== Archaeology ==
Excavations at the site have revealed many items from Neolithic, Bronze Age, Iron Age, and Romano-British periods. Most of the finds are now preserved at the Wiltshire Museum in Devizes. Most recently, Professor William Francis Grimes partially excavated the inner earthworks on the site in the 1950s. Finds included Iron Age pottery. In 1880 two Bronze Age axes were apparently found on or near Scratchbury Camp. Both are in private collection; one is a socketed type axe and the other resembles a late North European (Montelius 6) type.

Sir Richard Colt Hoare also records the discoveries of a neolithic jade axe and a ground flint axe, along with various 'British and Roman' pottery inside the camp, as excavated by William Cunnington in 1802. The jade axe is described by the archaeologist Kenneth Oakley as resembling Australian Aboriginal implements. The flint axe is of polished white flint, with the end re-chipped, and was found at the entrance to Scratchbury Camp. It measures 86 mm (3.4 in) long, by 63 mm (2.5 in) wide, and 25 mm (0.98 in) high.

The hillfort also contains seven bowl barrow tumuli within its boundaries, and a possible eighth just outside it, referenced as the Scratchbury Grave group, or the Scratchbury Hill Group, and which were excavated between 1802 and 1804 by Sir Richard Colt Hoare and William Cunnington. However, as the three-age system had not been introduced at that time, they were unable to date their finds and therefore were at a disadvantage when trying to interpret them. The tumuli were re-recorded in the 1957 surveys by W.F. Grimes. Descriptions from the reports and writings of Sir Richard Colt-Hoare and William Cunnington are given in the table below.

A record of the Scratchbury Grave Group bowl barrow tumuli located within Scratchbury Camp, and associated finds
| WM ref no. (Note: WM = Wiltshire Museum references) | RCH^{*} ref no. (Note: RCH = Original Sir Richard Colt-Hoare numbering) | SHG^{*} ref no. (Note: SHG = Scratchbury Hill Group numbering) | Dia. | Height | Images | Description |
|---|---|---|---|---|---|---|
| Norton Bavant Tumuli G1 | 1 | SH-05 | 81 ft (25 m) | 3 ft (0.91 m) | | Found to contain a cist within which was an interment of burned bones. Found amongst these were several finds including a small lance head or dagger of brass, a large amber ring, a piece of brass two to three inches long with ribbing and resembling a screw, a brass pin with twists, and more than fifty amber beads (identified as belonging to amber class 2 or 3). Also located next to the cist was a pile of ashes intermixed with fragments of smaller burned bones. The ribbed piece of brass is broken in the shank, just after a pronounced bulge in the shaft, it is decorated with an incised criss-cross decoration on top of the head, and the ribbing around the shaft appears to cease just before the break. The twisted pin shank is of a similar date, showing similarities with Tumulus culture pins found in Central Europe |
| Norton Bavant Tumuli G2 | 2 | SH-06 | 45 ft (14 m) | 3.5 ft (1.1 m) | | Found to contain burned bones and some articles fashioned from bone, one of which is 64 mm (2.5 in) long by 20 mm (0.79 in) wide, and flat, with two holes at one end and with rough ridges across the surface. A second similar bone item, and a third bone item either a pin or arrow head, 97 mm (3.8 in) long, neatly polished to a very sharp point. The bone pin was possibly designed to be worn in the hair, whilst the holes in the bone plate suggest that it could have been designed for attachment to another material, or used for holding cords of material together. Sir Richard Colt Hoare's original interpretation as being a possible wristguard seems unlikely as the material would have been too brittle for this purpose. |
| Norton Bavant Tumuli G3 | 3 | SH-07 | 36 ft (11 m) | 2 ft (0.61 m) | | No recorded finds. |
| Norton Bavant Tumuli G4 | 7 | SH-04 | 100 ft (30 m) | 10 ft (3.0 m) | | The largest tumuli on the site and very conspicuous from the road below. It contained finds of fragments of antlers, boar's teeth, charcoal and large numbers of burnt stones, but no interment. The large quantity of stones that had undergone the action of fire seems to indicate that this was a sepulchral barrow, in which the ceremony of cremation was performed. |
| Norton Bavant Tumuli G4a | 6 | SH-03 | not recorded | not recorded | | No recorded finds. |
| Norton Bavant Tumuli G4b | 4 | SH-01 | 15 ft (4.6 m) | 0.25 ft (0.076 m) | | No recorded finds. |
| Norton Bavant Tumuli G4c | 5 | SH-02 | 30 ft (9.1 m) | 1.5 ft (0.46 m) | | Found to contain a few burned bones at some distance from the centre. |
| N/A | N/A | SH-08 | not recorded | not recorded | | Plotted in 1995 by the Royal Commission on the Historical Monuments of England (now English Heritage). Located outside of the hill-fort on the eastern slope of the hill. Identified as a circular crop mark visible in aerial photographs, but not investigated further. Could be another tumuli associated with the grave group. |

Notes on reference numbers/letters:

=== Nearby ===
There are numerous other tumuli and long barrows in the area surrounding Scratchbury Camp, including some located on the adjacent and co-joined Cotley Hill to the southeast, and on Middle Hill to the west. On the crown of Cotley Hill is a further Bronze Age tumulus surrounded by an Iron Age enclosure. Nearby to the northwest, on the side of Middle Hill, is the site of the deserted medieval village of Middleton, whose surviving earthworks consist of building platforms cut into lynchets and enclosed by a boundary bank and ditch, and a hollow-way. There are also signs of strip lynchets immediately to the north of Scratchbury Camp on the side of the hill. A Roman bronze spoon was found on or near Scratchbury Camp in 1804, and a Roman urn was found in the surrounding area before 1856

== Geography ==
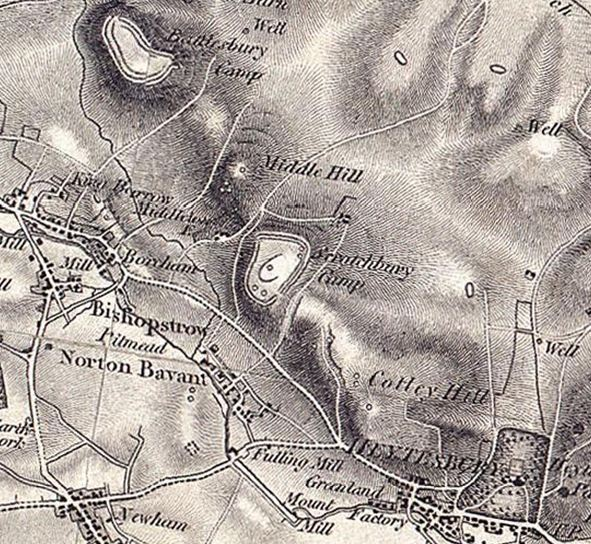
1817 Ordnance Survey Map of Scratchbury Camp

Scratchbury is on the edge of the chalk plateau of Salisbury Plain, and within the area of Norton Bavant Chalk Downland Edge, as described by the West Wiltshire Landscape Character Assessment. The hill has extensive views overlooking the Wylye valley to the south.

The Salisbury Plain chalk massif is part of a system of chalk downlands throughout eastern and southern England formed by the rocks of the Chalk Group; the landscape is underlain by a combination of Lower, Middle and Upper Chalk supporting shallow well drained calcareous silty soils over chalk on slopes and crests. Escarpments are often formed where layers of chalk have been compressed to form a fold, or where the chalk has been faulted, resulting in accelerated erosion along the line of the weakness.

For the Norton Bavant Chalk Downland Edge, the 'character' of this area encompasses three distinctive, steeply sloping hills (Middle Hill, Scratchbury Hill, and Cotley Hill), which form a distinct and somewhat isolated unit of Chalk Downland Edge. The hills are covered with long fields, which are predominantly arable, with occasional patches of rough remnant chalk grassland and scrub on the tops of the hills. Many chalk grassland slopes in England show the mark of centuries of grazing by sheep, the slopes bearing a stepped or striped appearance formed by a mixture of soil creep and sheep paths, and such erosion is visible on the slopes of Scratchbury Hill. Regular patches and belts of mixed woodland populate parts of the lower slopes. Imber military range perimeter paths run across the top of the hills, providing public access to the area.

== Ecology ==
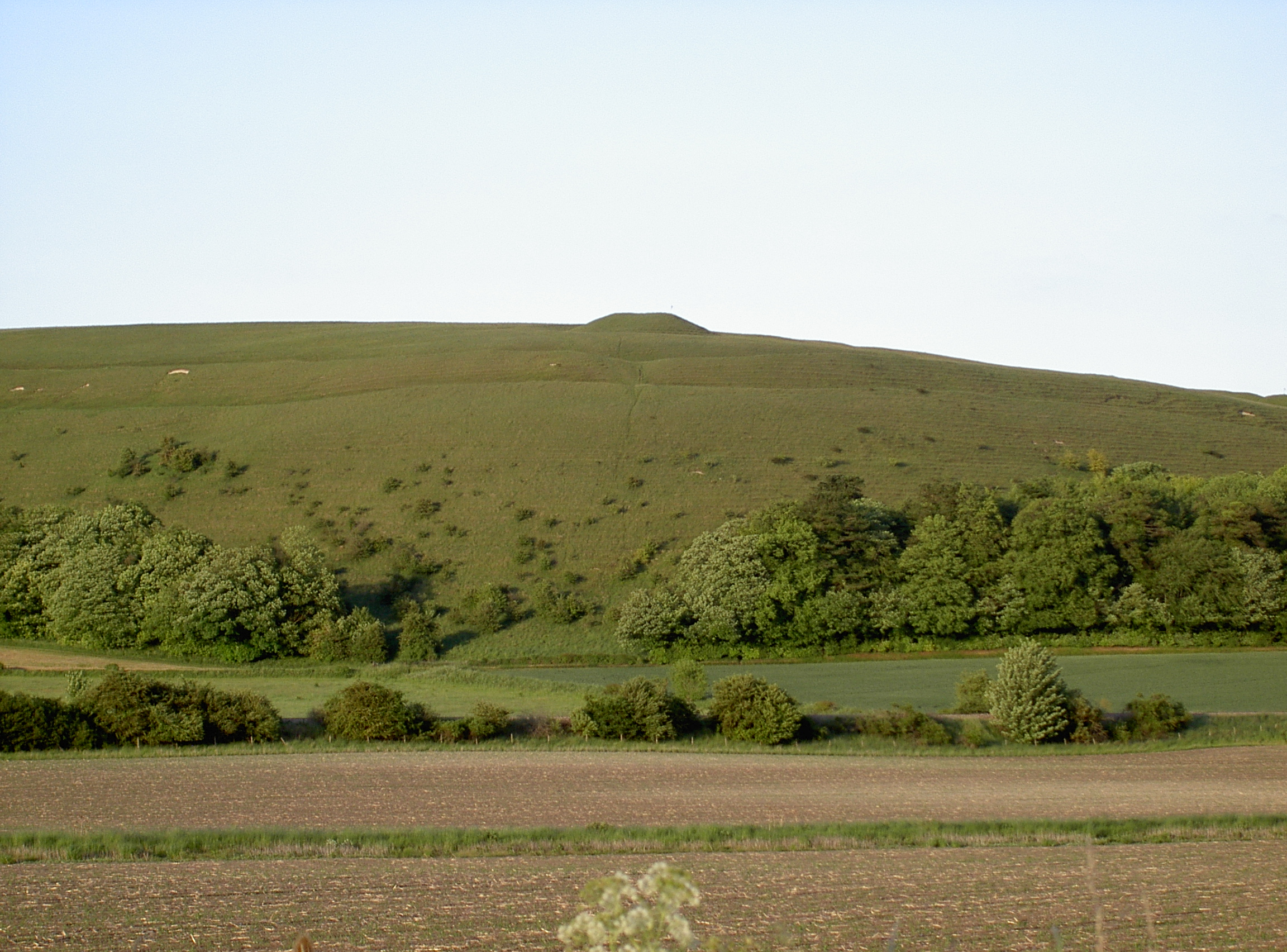
Scratchbury Camp as viewed from the southwest: the distinctive features of Scratchbury Hill, including the ramparts of the hill fort and one of the taller barrows, are clearly defined

Scratchbury is within an area of unimproved grassland on the edge of Salisbury Plain, which is the largest remaining area of calcareous grassland in north-west Europe. The local area supports a rich and diverse grassland flora along with an important associated butterfly fauna, and this led to it being notified as a biological Site of Special Scientific Interest in 1951. Designated as Scratchbury & Cotley Hills SSSI, the site encompasses a total of 53.5 hectares (132 acres). The ecology and historical agricultural use of the site is such that regular grazing by sheep is required to maintain the balance of the flora, and to control the growth of shrubs.

The grassland is generally dominated by sheep's fescue (Festuca ovina), red fescue (Festuca rubra), and upright brome (Bromus erectus). There are also several varieties of herbs, characteristic to the Wiltshire downland, including for devil's bit scabious (Succisa pratensis), saw-wort (Serratula tinctoria), and chalk milkwort (Polygala calcarea). There are also many other native and site specific plants, including orchids, meadow grasses, nettles, and other flora. On the steep slopes horseshoe vetch (Hippocrepis comosa), Thymus, and Asperula is plentiful

Within the hillfort, a more mesotrophic grassland is present, most probably reflecting past agricultural use and improvement. There are also small areas of hawthorn (Crataegus monogyna), and elder (Sambucus) scrub, particularly along the lower slopes of the downland and on the earthworks. These provide valuable shelter for invertebrates on an otherwise open and exposed site.

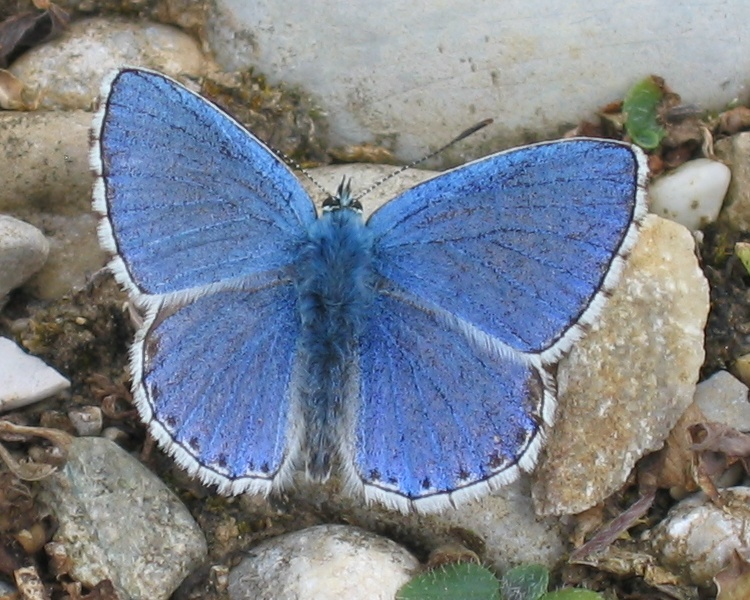
The Adonis blue butterfly can be found on and around Scratchbury Camp

The site is of high entomological interest, with 29 varieties of resident breeding species of butterfly recorded. The horseshoe vetch (Hippocrepis comosa) is locally plentiful and supports both the chalkhill blue (Lysandra coridon) and the Adonis blue (Lysandra bellargus) butterflies. Other butterfly species to be found on and around the site include the Duke of Burgundy (Hamearis lucina), the grizzled skipper (Pyrgus malvae), the dark green fritillary (Speyeria aglaja), and the small blue (Cupido minimus).

Other insect groups on the site are less well surveyed, but several rare species have been recorded, including six species of weevil (Curculionoidea), eight species of plant bugs (Hemiptera), and two species of chrysomelid beetle, Aphthona herbigrada and Mantura matthewsii; both of which feed on the rock rose (Helianthemum). Day-flying moths recorded include the wood tiger (Parasemia plantaginis), and the rare forester moth (Jordanita globulariae). Small mammals such as rabbits (Oryctolagus cuniculus) and badgers (Meles meles) are common to the site and the surrounding area.

== Poetry ==
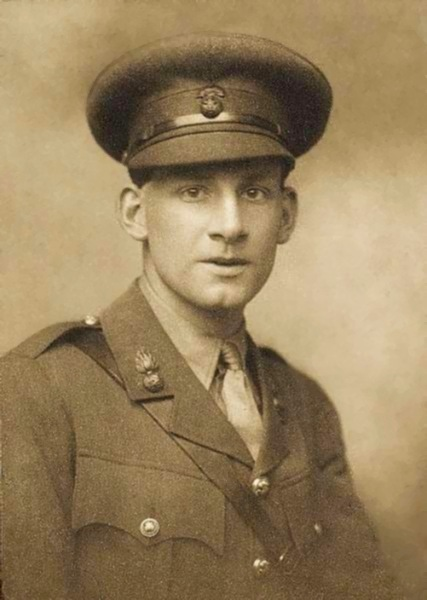
Siegfried Sassoon

The English poet and author Siegfried Sassoon (1886–1967), who lived nearby at Heytesbury House, wrote about Scratchbury Camp on a June day in 1942, capturing the ambience of the Wiltshire Downs on a summer's day, whilst touching on the pervasive military presence of that age and the historical timelessness of the area.

Along the grave green downs, this idle afternoon,
shadows of loitering silver clouds, becalmed in blue,
bring, like unfoldment of a flower, the best of June.

Shadows outspread in spacious movement, always you
have dappled the downs and valleys at this time of year,
while larks, ascending shrill, praised freedom as they flew.

Now, through that song, a fighter squadron's drone I hear
from Scratchbury Camp, whose turfed and cowslip'd rampart seems
more hill than history, ageless and oblivion-blurred.

I walk the fosse, once manned by bronze and flint head spear;
on war's imperious wing the shafted sun ray gleams:
one with the warm sweet air of summer stoops the bird.

Cloud shadows, drifting slow like heedless daylight dreams,
dwell and dissolve; uncircumstanced they pause and pass.
I watch them go. My horse, contented, crops the grass.

— Siegfried Sassoon, On Scratchbury Camp, as published in 'The Best Poems of 1943'.

== Location ==
The site is located at grid reference ST912442, to the east of the town of Warminster and to the north of the village of Norton Bavant, in the county of Wiltshire. The hill has a summit of 197 m (646 ft) AOD. Nearby to the northwest lies Middle Hill, and further northwest the hillfort of Battlesbury Camp, on Battlesbury Hill. To the southeast lies Cotley Hill. The site and surrounding downs are easily accessible by public footpath: the Wessex Ridgeway and the Imber Range perimeter path follow the northern ramparts of the fort, however care must be taken not to stray into the military firing ranges of Salisbury Plain immediately to the northeast. Cranborne Chase and West Wiltshire Downs Area of Outstanding Natural Beauty lies to the south.

== See also ==
- List of hillforts in England
