= Leslie Gibson =

Leslie Gibson may refer to:

- Leslie Gibson (judge)
- Leslie Gibson (artist)
