= Norton Bavant =

Village in Wiltshire, England

Coordinates: 51.187°N 2.131°W

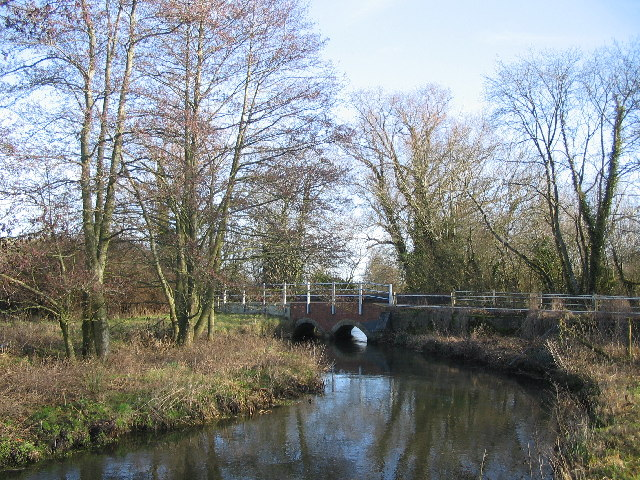
- River Wylye at Norton Bavant

- Location within Wiltshire
- Population: 116 (in 2011)
- OS grid reference: ST909431
- Civil parish: Norton Bavant
- Unitary authority: Wiltshire
- Ceremonial county: Wiltshire
- Region: South West
- Country: England
- Sovereign state: United Kingdom
- Post town: Warminster
- Postcode district: BA12
- Dialling code: 01985
- Police: Wiltshire
- Fire: Dorset and Wiltshire
- Ambulance: South Western
- UK Parliament: South West Wiltshire
- Website: Norton Bavant

Norton Bavant is a small village and civil parish in Wiltshire, England, 2 miles (3.2 km) southeast of Warminster.

== Geography ==
The village is on the River Wylye and at the edge of Salisbury Plain. To the north lies Scratchbury and Cotley Hills Site of Special Scientific Interest, and the Iron Age hillfort of Scratchbury Camp.

The A36 road to Salisbury bypasses the village to the south, on the other side of the river. The earlier direct route of the road, just north of the village, is now the B3414.

The Wessex Main Line railway between Warminster and Salisbury, opened 1856, follows the river valley and crosses the parish to the north and east of the village. The local station at Heytesbury was closed in 1955.

== History ==
Domesday Book of 1086 recorded a settlement with 22 households at Nortone.

John Marius Wilson's Imperial Gazetteer of England and Wales (1870–1872) described Norton Bavant as follows:

NORTON-BAVANT, a village and a parish in Warminster district, Wilts. The village stands on the river Wiley, adjacent to the Salisbury and Westbury railway, 1¼ mile N W of Heytesbury r. station, and 2¾ S E by E of Warminster. The parish includes a detached portion, separated from the main body by Warminster parish. Post-town, Warminster. Acres, 2,165. Real property, £3,549. Pop., 261. Houses, 61. The property is divided among a few. Norton House is a chief residence. The living is a vicarage in the diocese of Salisbury. Value, £250. Patron, the Lord Chancellor. The church was recently rebuilt. There are a parochial school, and charities £4.

Norton Bavant Manor was built in the late 17th century and is Grade II* listed.

== Parish church ==
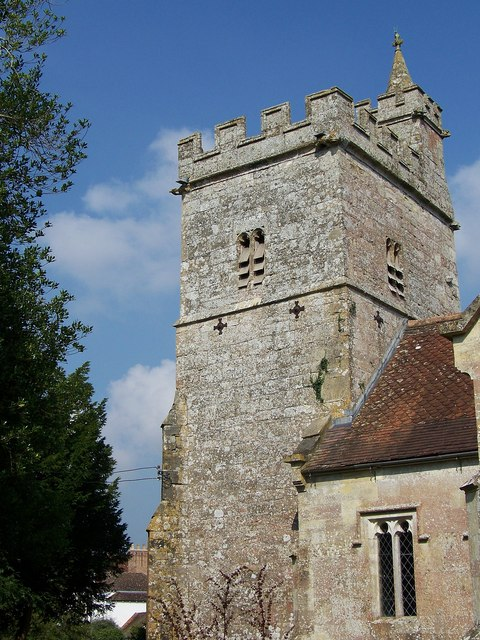
Tower of All Saints Church

A priest was mentioned at Norton in the mid-12th century. The present parish church of All Saints, which now stands in the grounds of Norton Bavant House, has a tower from the 14th and 15th centuries; the Benett chapel is also from the 14th. The body of the church was rebuilt in 1838–40 using limestone ashlar, on the footprint of the earlier church. There was further restoration in 1853 and 1894.

The five bells in the tower are said to be unringable. One is from the late 14th century while others are dated 1656, 1711 and 1894. A lychgate in timber with a tiled roof was erected in 1893.

In 1976 the parish was united with the parishes of Heytesbury with Tytherington and Knook, and Sutton Veny. The parish is now part of the Upper Wylye Valley group.

== Local government ==
Norton Bavant is considered to be too small to elect a parish council, and instead has a Parish Meeting, at which all electors for the parish are able to speak and vote. Local government services are provided by Wiltshire Council, which has its offices in Trowbridge. The village is represented in Parliament by the MP for South West Wiltshire, Andrew Murrison, and in Wiltshire Council by Christopher Newbury.

== Notable people ==
- Etheldred Benett (1776–1845), later called the 'first lady geologist', lived in the village; a memorial board commemorating her achievements is in the churchyard of All Saints Parish Church
- Sir John Jardine Paterson (1920–2000), Scottish businessman, lived at the Manor House in retirement

== See also ==
- Fifield Bavant – for etymology of Bavant
