= River Till SSSI, Wiltshire =

Protected area in Wiltshire, England

Coordinates: 51.20599°N 1.92838°W

The River Till SSSI (grid reference SU051452) is a 32.07 hectares (79.2 acres) biological Site of Special Scientific Interest in Wiltshire, England, notified in 2000.

The notification applies to the whole length of the River Till, from its source near Orcheston (on Salisbury Plain between Tilshead and Shrewton) to its confluence with the River Wylye. It is significant because its vegetation includes water crowfoot, which provides habitat for fish and snails.
