= Berwick St James =

Village and civil parish on the River Till in Wiltshire, England

Coordinates: 51.153°N 1.899°W

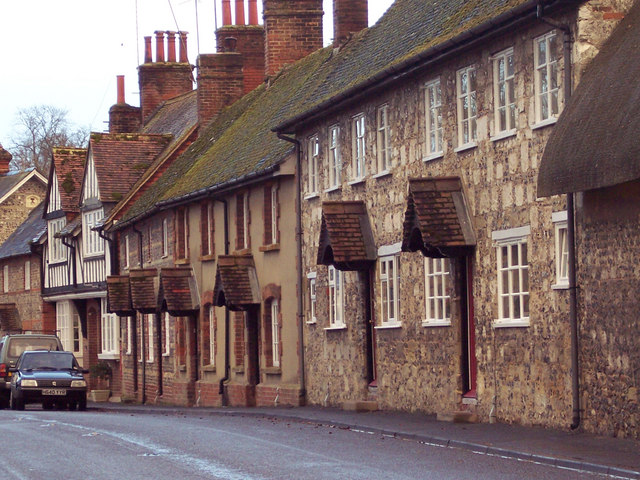

- Location within Wiltshire
- Population: 137 (in 2021)
- OS grid reference: SU072393
- Civil parish: Berwick St James
- Unitary authority: Wiltshire
- Ceremonial county: Wiltshire
- Region: South West
- Country: England
- Sovereign state: United Kingdom
- Post town: Salisbury
- Postcode district: SP3
- Dialling code: 01722
- Police: Wiltshire
- Fire: Dorset and Wiltshire
- Ambulance: South Western
- UK Parliament: East Wiltshire
- Website: Village

Berwick St James is a village and civil parish on the River Till in Wiltshire, England, about 7 miles (11 km) northwest of Salisbury, on the southern edge of Salisbury Plain. The parish includes the hamlet of Asserton. At the 2021 census the parish had a population of 137.

The village High Street is the B3083 road which follows the river: south to Stapleford and the A36 Warminster-Salisbury road, and north to Winterbourne Stoke and the A303 trunk road, which cuts across the north-west of the parish.

== History ==
Yarnbury Castle, an Iron Age hillfort, is partly within the parish. In the Domesday Book of 1086, estates at Berwick and Asserton were part of Winterbourne Stoke; by the 12th century the village had its present name. The name Berwick derives from the Old English berewīc meaning 'barley farm'. Stapleford Castle, a medieval ringwork castle, was just south of the parish at Stapleford. In 1377, Berwick St. James had 80 poll-tax payers and there were 27 at Asserton.

Berwick St James manor was held by the Chaworth family from the late 11th century, and was brought to the earls of Lancaster after Maud Chaworth (1282–1322) married Henry, a grandson of Henry III who became 3rd Earl of Lancaster. The manor passed to the Crown in 1399 when Lancaster's Henry Bolingbroke was declared Henry IV. The Wiltshire Victoria County History traces the later owners.

Manor Farmhouse, on the village High Street, is late 16th century; Berwick House, to the west of the High Street, is early 19th century.

In the 1920s the High Street was part of the A360 Devizes-Salisbury road, which followed the Bourne valley. Sometime before 1958 the main road was redirected onto higher ground further east.

=== Assserton ===
In medieval times, Asserton was a village or hamlet with its own church or chapel, on the east bank of the river, opposite Berwick. In the 14th and 15th centuries it was a separate tithing. In 1557 Asserton manor was granted to James Basset, a courtier to Queen Mary. Asserton House was built in the late 18th century and rebuilt early in the 19th.

=== Lake Down Aerodrome ===
Between 1917 and 1919, downland in the east of the parish on both sides of the A360 was the site of Lake Down Aerodrome, one of several Training Depot Stations created in the area to support the rapid expansion of the Royal Flying Corps. An extension of the Amesbury and Military Camp Light Railway connected the site to Larkhill Camp, further north. The airfield's six hangars and other buildings were removed and the railway was dismantled, but a water tower, engine shed and workshop survive.

== Parish church ==
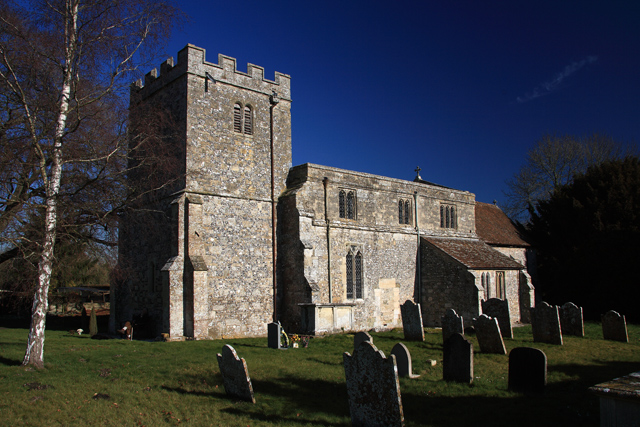
St James' Church

There was a church in the mid 12th century, and by c.1191 it was dedicated to St James. It was appropriated in 1406 or 1407 by Mottisfont Priory (Hampshire). The flint and limestone building, described by Orbach as an "endearing church of disparate parts", was designated as Grade I listed in 1960.

Its oldest feature is the Norman (12th-century) north doorway, flanked by columns, with shallow decoration to the lintel and chevron carving in the arch. The tympanum has undecorated blocks, as if some painted or carved decoration is missing.

The chancel with its lancet windows is mid-13th century, although the chancel arch and tower arch are probably a century later. The early north chapel was rebuilt in the 15th century, and around then or in the next century, work to the nave included the addition of a clerestory and a south porch, and the rebuilding of the south chapel. The squat west tower fell c.1655 and was rebuilt in 1670, in a plain style similar to Stapleford. The church was restored in 1871; the chancel roof was replaced and the three-bay nave roof, probably 16th-century, was restored.

The font, a plain cylindrical bowl, is 12th-century. The 15th-century stone pulpit is a rare survival. The four bells are from the 17th and 18th centuries and are said to be unringable.

The benefice was united with that of Stapleford in 1924, and in 1992 the parish became part of the Lower Wylye and Till Valley benefice, which today covers eight rural churches.

== Local government ==
The civil parish does not elect a parish council. Instead the first tier of local government is a parish meeting, which all electors are entitled to attend. The parish is in the area of Wiltshire Council unitary authority, which is responsible for all significant local government functions.

== Amenities ==
The village has a pub, the Boot Inn, which is a 17th-century building altered in the 1890s.

A National School was built north-west of the church in 1856 and was in use until 1936 when a new school was built in Stapleford parish to serve both parishes; this school closed in 1992.
