= Tilshead =

Village and civil parish in Wiltshire, England

Coordinates: 51.230°N 1.951°W

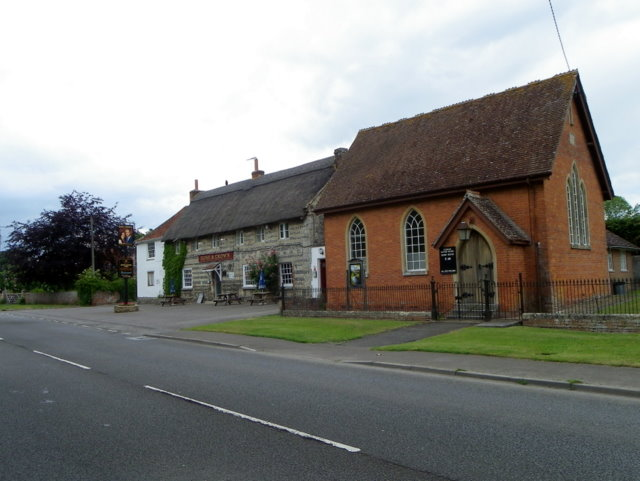
- The Rose and Crown public house and Tilshead Baptist Chapel, Tilshead

- Location within Wiltshire
- Population: 358 (in 2011)
- OS grid reference: SU035379
- Unitary authority: Wiltshire
- Ceremonial county: Wiltshire
- Region: South West
- Country: England
- Sovereign state: United Kingdom
- Post town: Salisbury
- Postcode district: SP3
- Dialling code: 01980
- Police: Wiltshire
- Fire: Dorset and Wiltshire
- Ambulance: South Western
- UK Parliament: East Wiltshire
- Website: Parish Council

Tilshead (/ˈtɪlshɛd/) is a village and civil parish in the county of Wiltshire in Southern England, about 9 miles (14 km) northwest of the town of Amesbury. It is close to the geographical centre of Salisbury Plain, on the A360 road approximately midway between the villages of Shrewton and West Lavington and is near the source of the River Till. Its population in 2011 was 358, down from a peak of 989 inhabitants in 1951.

== History ==
Salisbury Plain has much evidence of prehistoric activity. One kilometre south of Tilshead village, under the ridge of Copehill Down, is the White Barrow, a large Neolithic long barrow. To the southwest and southeast are ancient boundary ditches, partly followed by the parish boundary; the ditch in the southeast has a long barrow next to it.

The name of the settlement derives from "Theodwulf's hide". In 1086, Tydolveshyde or Tidolthide was a borough and large royal estate, with a relatively large population of 164 households and nine mills. The tithing of South Tilshead was a manor of Romsey Abbey until the dissolution of the monasteries, and came to be a detached part of the hundred of Whorwellsdown.

The name Tilshead came into use in the 16th century. The river was called the Winterbourne until around the start of the 20th century, when the name River Till began to be used on Ordnance Survey maps.

The village has houses from the 17th and 18th centuries, some thatched. Tilshead House, on the High Street, is a three-storey house of the early 19th century, in red brick.

Tilshead Lodge was built in the early 18th century to the southwest of the village, then rebuilt c. 1800. The estate was used for racehorse training in the early 19th and early 20th centuries, then was sold to the War Office in 1911 and 1933. The house was demolished sometime after 1957.

== Local government ==
The civil parish elects a parish council. It is in the area of Wiltshire Council, a unitary authority which is responsible for all significant local government functions.

== Religious sites ==
=== Parish church ===
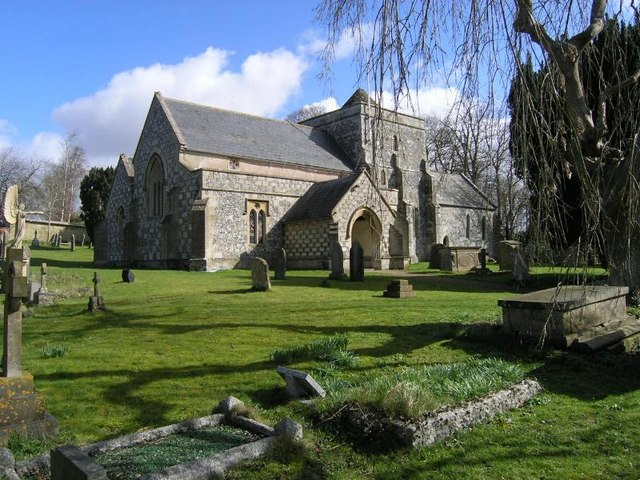
Church of St Thomas à Becket

There was a church at Tilshead in the early 12th century, possibly since Saxon times. The three-bay north and south arcades with their square piers are from that period, and the font bowl is also from that century.

The chancel was rebuilt in the mid-13th century, and were renovations in the 17th and 18th centuries included re-roofing it. T.H. Wyatt and D. Brandon directed restoration in 1845-6 which added the south porch and north vestry, and there was further work in 1904. The church is built in flint and limestone, partly chequered, and has a low central tower with a small conical roof; it was recorded as Grade I listed in 1958. The three bells were cast in 1764 by Thomas Bilbie I.

Income from the church went to Ivychurch Priory near Salisbury from 1317. The dedication to St Thomas is first recorded in 1763; it may come from the link with Ivychurch, as it is thought that the saint stayed at the priory during the Council of Clarendon in 1164.

A plain-fronted vicarage was built in red brick to the west of the church in 1818, and sold c.1972. In 1971 the benefice was united with those of Chitterne and Orcheston. Today the parish forms part of the Salisbury Plain benefice, which also encompasses the churches at Shrewton.

=== Others ===
A small redbrick Baptist chapel was built next to the main road in 1882 and closed in 2015.

== Amenities ==
Tilshead has a primary school, St Thomas à Becket C of E (Aided) Primary School, which was built next to the church in 1905.

There is a pub – the Rose and Crown, a 17th-century building – and a village hall.

The whole length of the River Till (which is a winterbourne, dry for much of the year) is a biological Site of Special Scientific Interest.

== Military land ==
Much of Salisbury Plain is used by the Ministry of Defence for military training. Westdown Camp, 0.4 miles (0.64 km) to the east of the village, is an accommodation centre for the Salisbury Plain Training Area.

RAF Tilshead, to the southwest of the village, was in use from 1925 to 1941. Its land is currently used as part of Salisbury Plain Training Area.
