= Battlesbury Camp =

Iron Age hillfort in Wiltshire, England

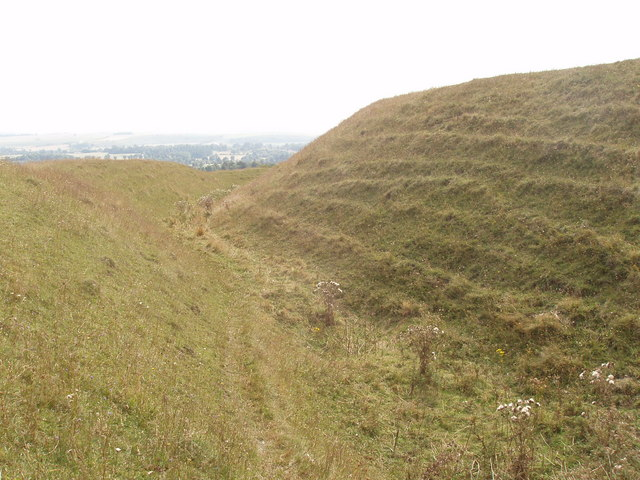
- Iron age earth walls and ditch, at the eastern edge of Battlesbury Hillfort

- Location within Wiltshire
- 51.2095°N 2.1474°W
- Periods: Bronze Age, Iron Age
- Location: Wiltshire

Site notes
- Area: 23.5 acres (9.5 ha)
- Excavation dates: yes
- Condition: good
- Public access: yes

Battlesbury Camp is the site of an Iron Age bivallate hill fort on Battlesbury Hill near the town of Warminster in Wiltshire, South West England. Excavations and surveys at the site have uncovered various finds and archaeological evidence.

== Background ==
Hill forts developed in the Late Bronze and Early Iron Age, roughly the start of the first millennium BC. The reason for their emergence in Britain, and their purpose, has been a subject of debate. It has been argued that they could have been military sites constructed in response to invasion from continental Europe, sites built by invaders, or a military reaction to social tensions caused by an increasing population and consequent pressure on agriculture. The dominant view since the 1960s has been that the increasing use of iron led to social changes in Britain. Deposits of iron ore were located in different places to the tin and copper ore necessary to make bronze, and as a result trading patterns shifted and the old elites lost their economic and social status. Power passed into the hands of a new group of people. Archaeologist Barry Cunliffe believes that population increase still played a role and has stated "[the forts] provided defensive possibilities for the community at those times when the stress [of an increasing population] burst out into open warfare. But I wouldn't see them as having been built because there was a state of war. They would be functional as defensive strongholds when there were tensions and undoubtedly some of them were attacked and destroyed, but this was not the only, or even the most significant, factor in their construction".

== Description ==
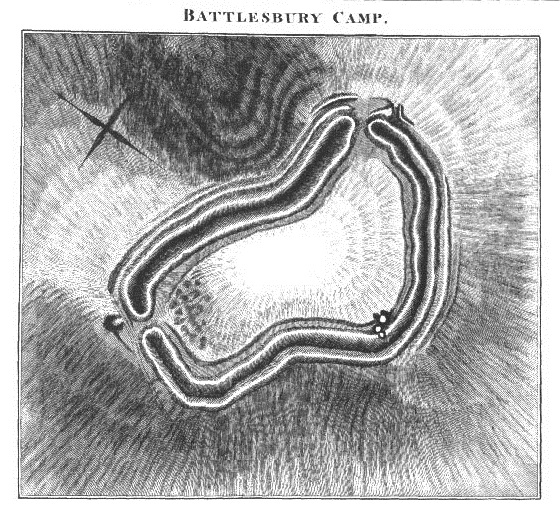
Pencil sketch of Battlesbury Camp, from The Ancient History of Wiltshire by Sir Richard Colt Hoare, 1810

Battlesbury occupies the summit of an irregular point of down, with its defences following the natural contours of the hill; by nature of the site it is almost inaccessible on the west and northeast sides. It has triple ditches and ramparts for the most part, doubled on the southeast side. The site encloses 23.5 acres in all. There are entrances at the northeast and northwest corners.

Pits found within the fortifications contained late Iron Age pottery, the hub of a chariot wheel, an iron carpenter's saw, a latch-lifter for a hut door, querns, whetstones, sling stones, and animal bones. These all indicate a permanent occupation and date from the 1st century BC. A group of graves containing men, women and children outside the east entrance has been interpreted as war burials, possibly from the Roman conquest.

The southwest area of the hill fort is apparently built over and around preceding Bronze Age burial mounds or tumuli. Part of the inner ditch is occupied by a large circular barrow, which was excavated, but was found empty. A few feet further to the west are two other barrows, over which the great inner rampart passes; these on opening, proved to be sepulchral: in the largest was found a cist containing burned human bones at the depth of two feet; and in the smallest, two skeletons were found, lying from south to north, the head of the smallest reclining on the breast of the other. On the breast of the largest skeleton there was a small ring or bead of stone, which was probably worn as an amulet.

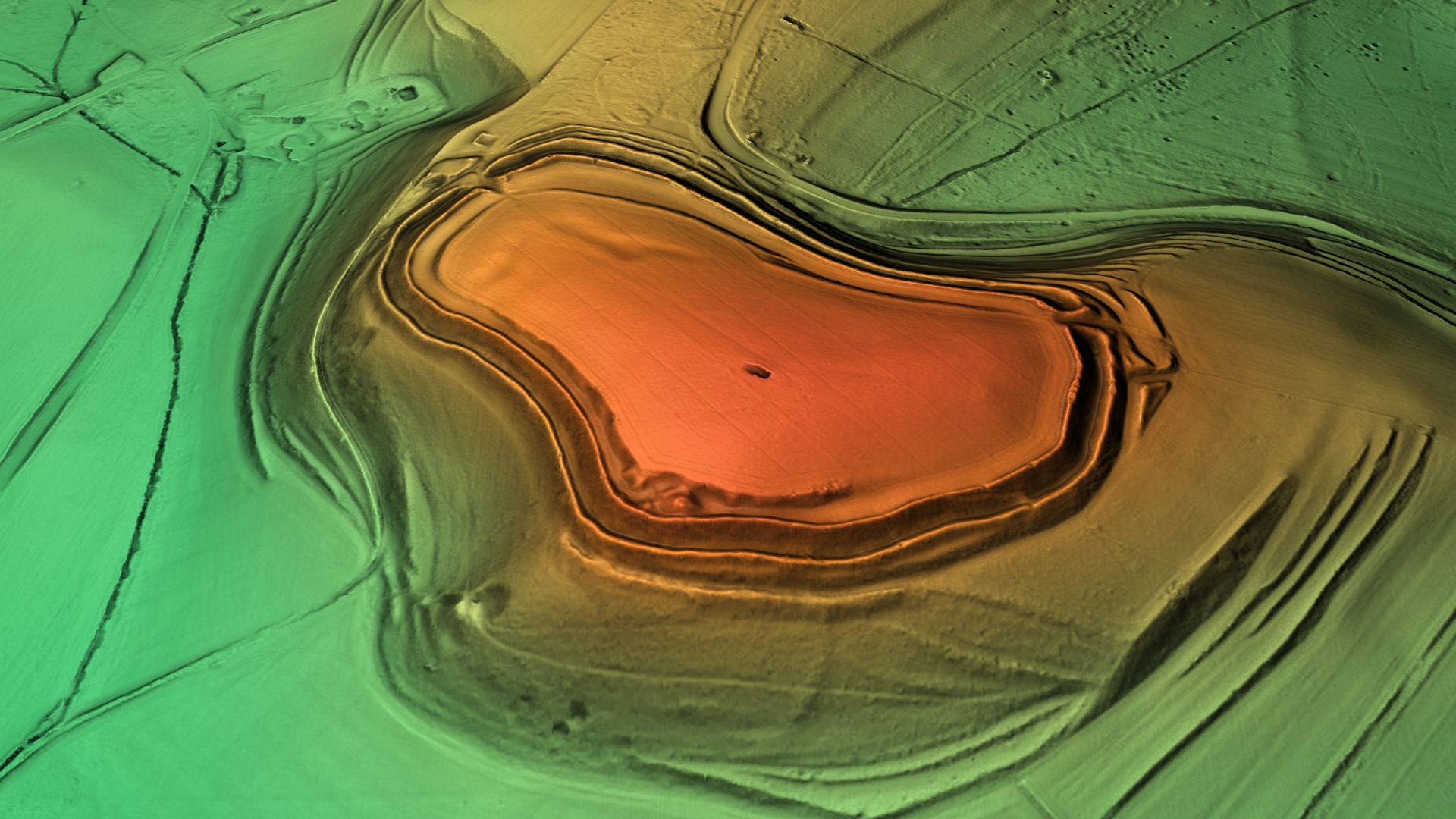
3D view of the digital terrain model

Later excavations and surveys adjacent to Battlesbury Camp hill fort in 1998 have also uncovered late Bronze Age to middle Iron Age settlement activity including ditches, roundhouses, four-post structures and many pits. Some of the pits contained human burials, and other deposits of artefacts and animal bones which appear to have been formally placed.

== Name ==
The name "Battlesbury" has been interpreted as referring to a battle fought on the hill, but Jordan suggests it derives from a personal name, Paettel: Paettel's burh.

== Location ==
The site is at grid reference ST898455, to the east of the town of Warminster, in the county of Wiltshire. The hill has a summit of 208m AOD and is marked by an Ordnance Survey triangulation station. Nearby to the southeast lies the hill fort of Scratchbury Camp on Scratchbury hill. The site and surrounding downs are easily accessible by public footpath; however, care must be taken not to stray into the military firing ranges of Salisbury Plain immediately to the northeast.

== See also ==
- List of hillforts in England
