= Tilshead Lodge =

Coordinates: 51.2261°N 1.965°W

Tilshead Lodge (now demolished) was a large 18th-century country house, southwest of Tilshead in Wiltshire, England, and about 13 miles (21 km) northwest of Salisbury.

== History ==
Tilshead Lodge was built in the early 18th century, probably as a sporting lodge. By 1760 there were formal gardens to the south of the house, which was rebuilt around 1800.

For most of its life the estate was a training establishment which, until the 19th century, was known as Tilshead Buildings. It is said by local tradition that Charles II stabled his horses there. The Andrews and Dury maps of Wiltshire in 1773 and 1810 show a racing circuit called "Tylshead Race" a mile south of the house, although this was probably built as a training circuit rather than for use in competitive races.

The estate was bought by the War Office in two lots, in 1911 and 1933, in order to extend the Salisbury Plain Training Area. During World War II the house and grounds were used as an army base. An Ordnance Survey map published in 1958 shows the house and outbuildings, with extensive military buildings on the chalk downs immediately to its west. The house was demolished in the 1950s and the military buildings had gone by 1982. Several trees remain near the site of the house, including a cedar and an avenue of limes.

== Owners and residents ==
William, Duke of Cumberland, who from the early 1750s till his death in 1765 took a major interest in horse-racing, is known to have resided there, and it is probable that two other members of the 18th-century racing elite, the 2nd Earl of Godolphin and the 2nd Earl of Portmore, both trained their horses at Tilshead Lodge. Richard Colt Hoare is recorded as an owner, and he also mentions the Earl of Godolphin and the Duke of Montrose as residing there. It was amongst the extensive estates owned by Walter Long in 1760.

Other records indicate it was bought in 1802 and rebuilt in 1808 by Gorges Lowther. John Long of Monkton Farleigh purchased it in 1819. At that time the estate consisted of "the Capital and elegant Mansion, lawns, plantations, farms and other appendages, and above 1,050 acres (4.2 km^{2}) of land". John Long sold it in 1830 to George Watson of Erlestoke who died in 1841, and he passed it to his son Simon Watson who still owned it when he died in 1902.

Among others recorded as living there are Robert Fettiplace, Montague Gore, John Parham, Robert Farquharson and Lady Violet Bonham Carter. Its use as racing stables continued into the 20th century, as it was a training establishment in 1907 when the Tilshead Lodge Estate was auctioned as part of the Erlestoke estate, and as late as 1937 it was being rented by the horse trainer Richmond Chartres Sturdy of Elston House.
