= Scratchbury and Cotley Hills SSSI =

Protected area in Wiltshire, England

Coordinates: 51.19246°N 2.12302°W

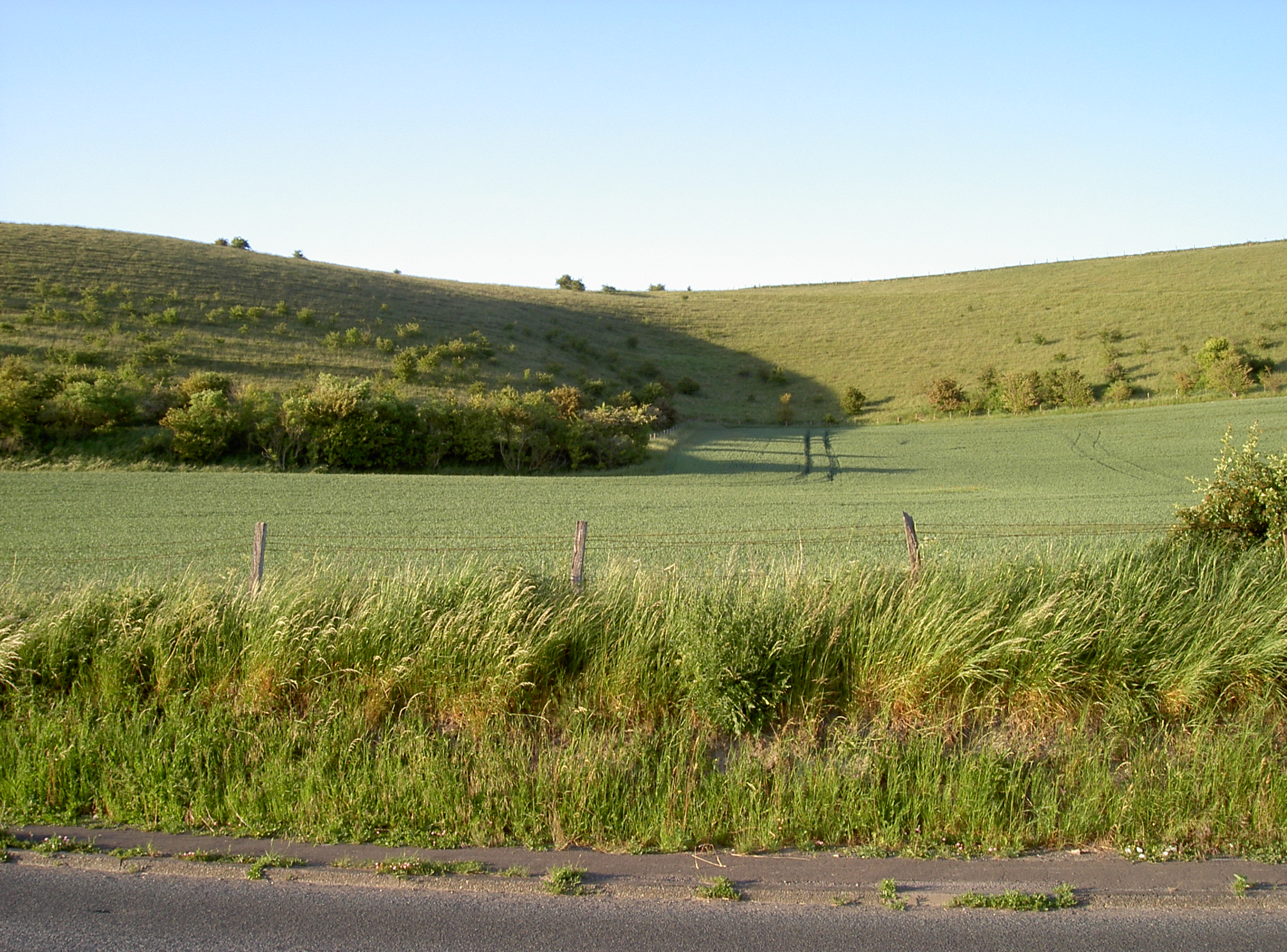
Cotley Hill

Scratchbury & Cotley Hills SSSI (grid reference ST915437) is a 53.5 hectare biological Site of Special Scientific Interest at Norton Bavant in Wiltshire, England, notified in 1951. The Iron Age hillfort of Scratchbury Camp occupies the summit of the hill.

The site is protected because of the chalk grassland that supports a large number of species of plants and butterflies. A butterfly species called the Duke of Burgundy has been recorded here.

== Sources ==
- Natural England citation sheet for the site (accessed 25 May 2023)
