= Stapleford, Wiltshire =

Village in Wiltshire, England

Coordinates: 51.136°N 1.902°W

Stapleford
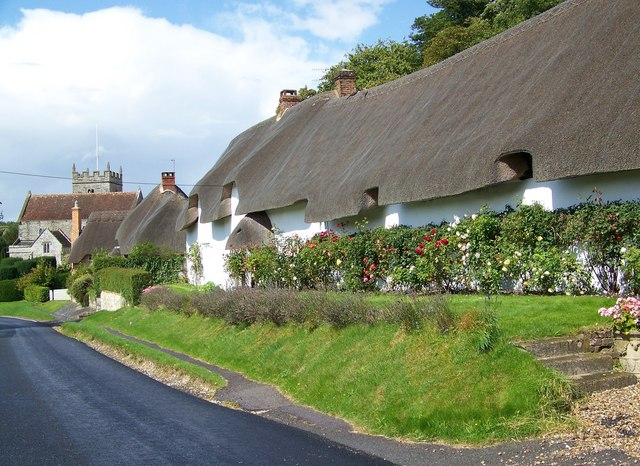
- Cottages in Stapleford, church in left background

- Location within Wiltshire
- Population: 264 (in 2011)
- OS grid reference: SU070374
- Civil parish: Stapleford
- Unitary authority: Wiltshire
- Ceremonial county: Wiltshire
- Region: South West
- Country: England
- Sovereign state: United Kingdom
- Post town: Salisbury
- Postcode district: SP3
- Dialling code: 01722
- Police: Wiltshire
- Fire: Dorset and Wiltshire
- Ambulance: South Western
- UK Parliament: East Wiltshire
- Website: Parish Council

Stapleford is a village and civil parish about 4 miles (6.4 km) north of Wilton, Wiltshire, England. The village is on the River Till, just above its confluence with the River Wylye.

The village is on the B3083 road, which joins the A36 at the southern end of the village. The parish includes the hamlet of Serrington, on the A36 0.25 miles (400 m) west of the B3083 junction.

== History ==
The Domesday survey of 1086 recorded an estate held by Swein at Stapleford, with 28 households. The manor passed to the Hussey family; in part, from the late 14th century the Sturmy family and then the Seymours, including John Seymour (1474–1536), father of Jane Seymour, Henry VIII's third wife. Land remained in Seymour ownership until the 1940s. Other land passed to the Giffards in the 14th century, and through the Mautravers, in 1405 to the Earls of Arundel, then from 1580 various owners including Sir Richard Howe, 2nd Baronet, the Barons Chedworth and (from 1808 until c. 1896) the Barons Ashburton.

By the Till to the north are the earthwork remains of Stapleford Castle, a medieval ringwork and bailey castle. Until at least the 1890s, two more settlement names were shown on maps of the parish. Over Street, on the opposite bank from Stapleford, is now considered part of the village; Uppington, on the east bank to the north, now has only a small number of houses.

The parish population peaked in the 19th century, with 337 recorded at the 1831 census; from 1861 to 2011, census returns have not exceeded 300.

== Parish church ==
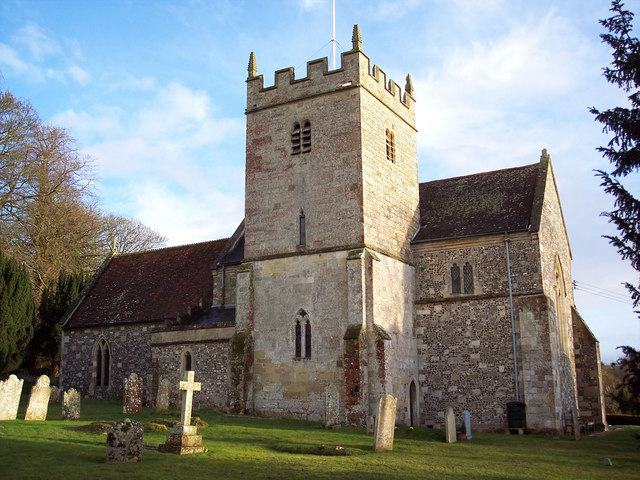
St Mary's Church

There was a church at Stapleford in the early 12th century, belonging to Salisbury Cathedral. The parish church of St Mary is built in chalk ashlar and flint, and 12th-century work is found in the north and west walls of the nave, the south arcade, and the west wall of the aisle. The chancel was rebuilt in the 13th century and the north tower was added c. 1300. There is a 13th-century north chapel and 14th-century south chapel. The clerestory was inserted in the 15th century, and the upper stage of the tower was rebuilt in 1675; a plaque on the south east side of the tower carries this date and gives the names of the then churchwardens.

Two of the six bells in the tower were cast in 1655. Restoration in 1861 by William Slater included partial rebuilding of the nave; stained glass by Clayton and Bell was installed in the tower in 1862. The chancel was restored in 1869.

The church was recorded as Grade I listed in 1960. Pevsner writes: "The Norman contributions make the church memorable, especially the tremendous round piers of the south arcade. They are nearly 3ft in diameter." The stone font is also 12th-century, though on a later base.

The benefice was united with that of Berwick St James in 1924, and in 1992 the parish became part of the Lower Wylye and Till Valley benefice, which today covers eight rural churches.

== Amenities ==
There is a village hall and a pub/restaurant, the Pelican Inn on the A36 at Serrington. The Monarch's Way long-distance footpath crosses Chain Hill, east of the village.

== Notable people ==
Henry Bennett pioneered rose hybridisation at Manor Farm, Stapleford between 1865 and 1880.

Harold Ridley (1906–2001), eye surgeon and inventor of the plastic lens to treat cataracts, lived in the village later in life.

The artist Leslie Gibson lived and worked at Stapleford from 1950 until his death in 1969.

Peter Chalke (born 1944), a Conservative politician, retired to live in Stapleford.
