= RAF Tilshead =

Former RAF station in Wiltshire, England

RAF Tilshead
- Tilshead, Wiltshire in England

Site information
- Type: Royal Air Force station
- Owner: Air Ministry
- Operator: Royal Air Force

Location
- Shown within Wiltshire
- Coordinates: 51°13′40″N 001°58′13″W

Site history
- Built: 1925
- In use: 1925-1941

Airfield information
- Elevation: 124 metres (407 ft) AMSL
Runways
Direction	Length and surface
00/00	Concrete
00/00	Concrete
00/00	Concrete

Royal Air Force Tilshead or more simply RAF Tilshead is a former Royal Air Force station west of Tilshead, Wiltshire, England and 9 miles (14 km) east of Warminster.

The unpaved airfield was open from 1925 until 1941. Nearby at Shrewton, a relief landing ground controlled by No. 38 Wing RAF was open from 1940 to 1946.

== Based units ==
No. 16 Squadron RAF flew the Westland Lysander as a detachment for RAF Weston Zoyland between 15 August 1940 and 8 September 1941, conducting reconnaissance protecting the country from the planned invasion and looking for enemy movements.

No. 225 (Army Co-operation) Squadron RAF also flew the Lysander before moving to RAF Thruxton.

The airfield also provided initial training period for the Glider Pilot Regiment providing basic flying training.

== Current use ==
The site is currently used by the British Army as part of the Salisbury Plain training area and there is nothing left of the airfield.
