= Yarnbury Castle =

Archaeological site in Wiltshire, England

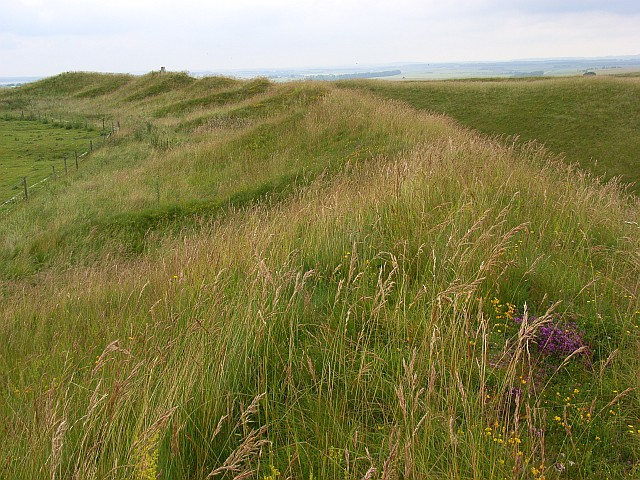
- The earthwork ramparts and ditches of Yarnbury Castle

- Location within Wiltshire
- 51.163°N 1.951°W
- Type: hillfort
- Location: Wiltshire
- Region: Southern England

History
- Built: Iron Age

Site notes
- Material: Chalk
- Height: 167 m (548 ft)
- Area: 28.5 acres (11.5 ha)
- Excavation dates: 1932, 1987
- Public access: No

Yarnbury Castle is the site of a multiphase, multivallate Iron Age hillfort near the village of Steeple Langford, Wiltshire, England. The site covers an area of 28.5 acres (11.5 ha), and was extensively surveyed and investigated by the Royal Commission on the Historical Monuments of England in 1991, with finds of Iron Age and Romano-British pottery, Iron Age and Roman coins, and burials of human remains. There is much evidence of prolonged and extensive settlement of the site, including evidence of around 130 structures of various sizes, most probably representing a mix of round houses, pits, and other features. It was designated as a scheduled monument in 1925.

The earthworks of Yarnbury Castle are also a biological Site of Special Scientific Interest (SSSI) first notified in 1951.

The site is on private land and has no public access.

== Location ==
Yarnbury Castle is about 1.9 miles (3 km) north of Steeple Langford village, and straddles the boundary between Steeple Langford and Berwick St James civil parishes. The A303 primary route runs close to the southern edge of the site, which by this road is about 2.5 miles (4 km) west of Winterbourne Stoke village.

== Archaeology ==
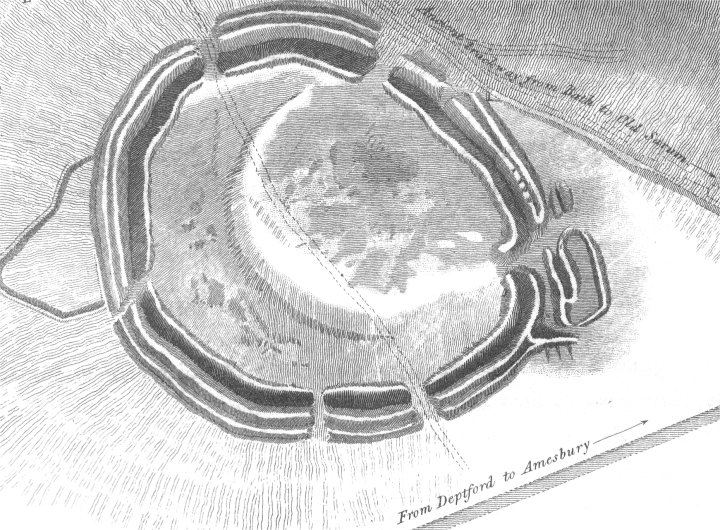
Pencil sketch of Yarnbury Castle by Sir Richard Colt-Hoare, 1810, from The Ancient History of Wiltshire

The earthworks at Yarnbury consist of three ramparts with outer ditches. The outer ramparts measure up to 3.5 m (11 ft) high, and the ditches a further 1.7 m (5.6 ft) deep, and are encroached upon by the centre rampart in places, suggesting that the inner and centre rampart are a later feature. The overall width of the earthworks is generally uniform at around 17 m (56 ft). The earthworks are generally well preserved, except in the northeastern side where the outermost ditch has been lost due to the encroachment of a downland driveway. In the centre of the hillfort lies an earlier and smaller single banked enclosure of 5.2 ha (13 acres) in area, and with an entrance in the western side of the earthwork.

The main earthworks are thought to date from around 100 BC, with the earlier inner circuit being from about 300 BC, according to pottery finds from early Iron Age through to Romano-British, including Samian of around 160 AD. The main entrance to the hillfort lies on the eastern side of the site, with a complex of earthwork fortifications. There is a further entrance at the northern end, possibly a later addition, with the entrance to the western side thought to be non-original or later so serve a smaller sub-rectangular Romano-British enclosure on that side of the fort.

Within the fort there is much evidence for many structures, mainly circular in plan, and within compounds with low earth banks. The structures vary between 7 m (23 ft) and 15 m (49 ft) in diameter, and up to 1.0 m (3.3 ft) deep. In particular, in the north and east of the site, and between the earlier enclosure and the inner rampart, there are a number of large compounds containing structures clearly visible, many with evidence for possible stone footings. It is also evident that a number of them overlap and indicate a prolonged and varied occupation of the site.

There have been numerous inhumations found at the site including two within pits, and isolated human bones found in other pits. Nine complete or partial remains of newly born and young infants have been found in the bottom of the earthwork ditches. Archaeological finds include pottery sherds, flint flakes, iron slag, Celtic coins, and bronze brooches. From later periods finds also include much Roman items, such as pottery, tiles, coins and three burials in graves.

== Sheep fairs ==
The Winterbourne Stoke sheep fair was held on the site from the 18th century until 1916, when the area was commandeered by the British Army. There are several prominent features associated with this former use, including several sheep folds to the south eastern corner of the hillfort. These are grouped in two blocks of 8, with low mounded earthworks clearly visible and covering an area of 120 m (390 ft) by 90 m (300 ft). They do not however appear in Sir Richard Colt Hoares pencil sketch of the site from 1810, indicating that these date from later in the 19th century.

The local author Ella Noyes (1863–1949) from Sutton Veny wrote in her book Salisbury Plain (1913), the following about the event:

Once a year Yarnbury becomes re-animate, on the day of the Horse and Sheep Fair, on the 4 October held in this lonely trysting place by immemorial tradition. Here.. the flocks..stand close packed in pens; bunches of young ponies are tied up in one corner.. and near by are the sober cart-horses, their plaited manes and tails aprick with ornaments of straw. The vendor of sheep bells spreads his metal wares upon the ground.. the purchase of sheep bells is a serious matter, good ones costing as much as five shillings..In the good old days, up to within the memory of people still living, the fair was followed by horse races next day, and sports of all kinds. But now the pleasure part of the meeting has been abandoned; the folk disperse quietly soon after noon, when business is done, leaving Yarnbury to the silent occupation of its prehistoric ghosts for another year.

== Ecology ==
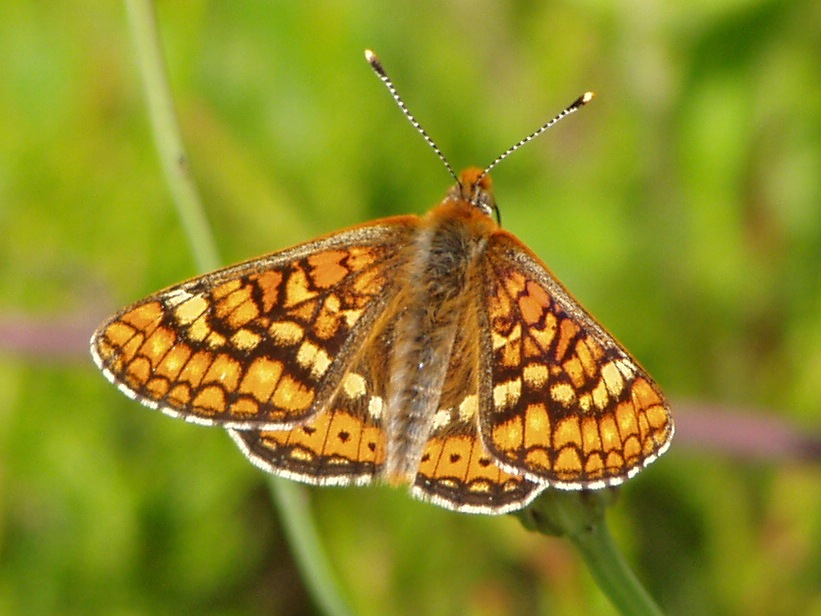
The marsh fritillary can be found at Yarnbury Castle

Yarnbury Castle is located in an area of unimproved grassland on the upper chalk north of the Wylye Valley, and on the edge of Salisbury Plain, which is the largest remaining area of calcareous grassland in north-west Europe. The local area supports a rich and diverse grassland flora, which led to it being declared a biological Site of Special Scientific Interest in 1951. Designated as Yarnbury Castle SSSI, the site encompasses a total of 9.1 hectares (22 acres).

The SSSI designation for the site arises due to interest in the biodiversity and species present upon the earthworks of the fort themselves, with the inner and surrounding parts of the site being of improved agricultural grassland of little interest. The earthworks support a rich chalk grassland flora, including several rare species. There are 16 species of grass and sedge recorded, among them upright brome (Bromus erectus), sheep's fescue (Festuca ovina), quaking grass (Briza media), crested hair-grass (Koeleria cristata), and dwarf sedge (Carex humilis). Various herb species include dwarf thistle (Cirsium acaule), chalk milkwort (Polygala calcarea), horseshoe vetch (Hippocrepis comosa), common thyme (Thymus praecox), squinancywort (Asperula cynanchica) and common rock-rose (Helianthemum nummularium).

Rarer national species include field fleawort (Senecio integrifolius), bastard toadflax (Thesium humifusum), and burnt orchid (Orchis ustulata), fragrant orchid (Gymnadenia conopsea), and other orchids.

The site was previously populated with scattered juniper (Juniperus communis) bushes, but these were removed and the current grazing regime ensures that they do not return. There are some invertebrates recorded, including marsh fritillary (Euphydryas aurinia) and small heath (Coenonympha pamphilus) butterflies, and a number of downland birds are present including the skylark, corn bunting and grey partridge.

== See also ==
- List of hillforts in England
