= Salisbury Plain =

Chalk plateau in England

Coordinates: 51.155°N 1.809°W

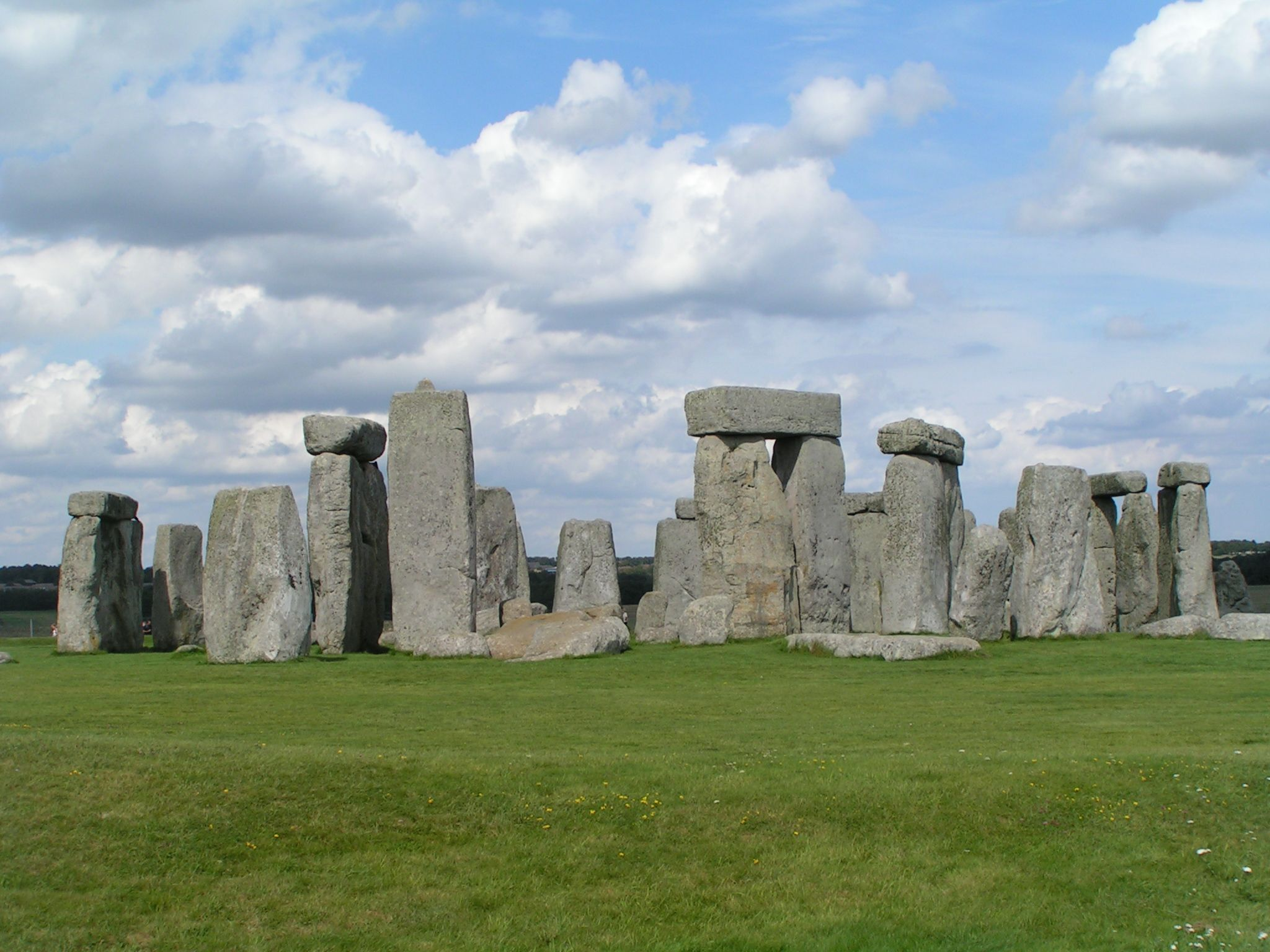
Stonehenge, on Salisbury Plain

Salisbury Plain is a chalk plateau in southern England covering 300 square miles (780 km^{2}). It is part of a system of chalk downlands throughout eastern and southern England formed by the rocks of the Chalk Group and largely lies within the county of Wiltshire, but stretches into Hampshire.

The plain is famous for its rich archaeology, including Stonehenge, one of England's best known landmarks. Large areas are given over to military training; thus, the sparsely populated plain is the biggest remaining area of calcareous grassland in northwest Europe. Additionally, the plain has arable land, and a few small areas of beech trees and coniferous woodland. Its highest point is Easton Hill.

The area set aside for military use is known as Salisbury Plain Training Area.

== Physical geography ==
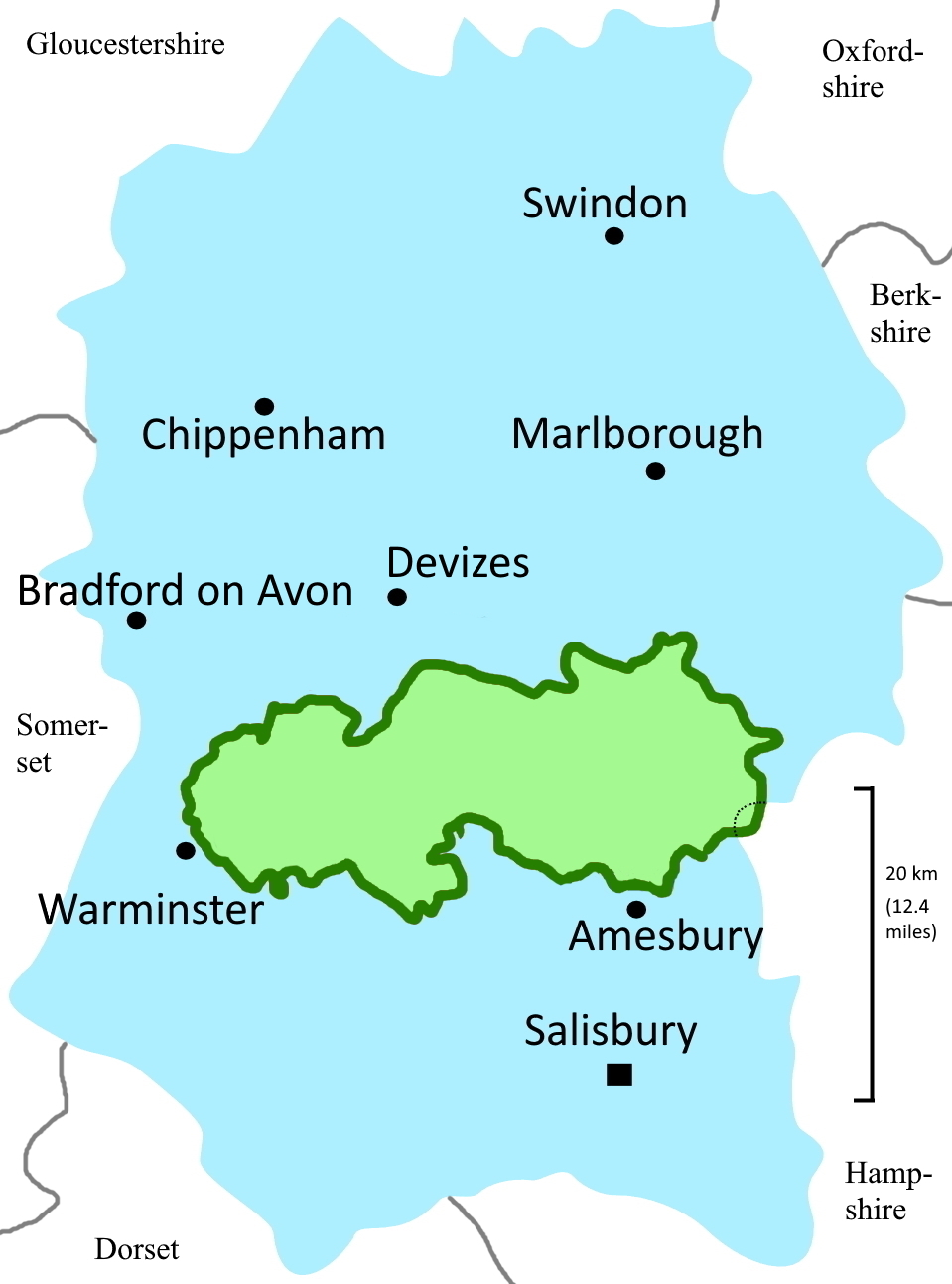
Rough map of military training area (green) on Salisbury Plain within Wiltshire (blue) (it accounts for about half the area of Salisbury Plain)

The boundaries of Salisbury Plain have never been truly defined, and there is some difference of opinion as to its exact area. The river valleys surrounding it, and other downs and plains beyond them loosely define its boundaries. To the north the scarp of the downs overlooks the Vale of Pewsey, and to the northwest the Bristol Avon. The River Wylye runs along the southwest, and the Bourne runs to the east.

The Hampshire Avon runs through the eastern half of the plain, and to the south the plain peters out as the river valleys close together before meeting at Salisbury. From here the Avon continues south to the English Channel at Christchurch. The Hampshire Downs and the Berkshire Downs are chalk downland to the east and north of Salisbury Plain, and the Dorset Downs and Cranborne Chase are to the southwest. In the west and north west the geology is mainly the clays and limestones of the Blackmore Vale, Avon Vale and Vale of Wardour. The Mendip Hills rise to the west of Salisbury Plain, and the Cotswolds to the north west.

Amesbury is considered the largest settlement on the plain (southern fringes), though there are a number of small villages, such as Tilshead, Chitterne and Shrewton in the middle of the plain, as well as various hamlets and army camps. The A303 road runs through the southern area of the plain, while the A345 and the A360 cut across the centre.

20,000 hectares are designated Sites of Special Scientific Interest and Special Areas of Conservation, and the entire Salisbury Plain is a Special Protection Area for birds.

== History ==
Salisbury Plain is famous for its history and archaeology. In the Neolithic period, Stone Age people began to settle on the plain, most likely centred around the causewayed enclosure of Robin Hood's Ball. Large long barrows such as White Barrow and other earthworks were built across the plain. By 2500 BC areas around Durrington Walls and Stonehenge had become a focus for building, and the southern part of the plain continued to be settled into the Bronze Age.

Around 600 BC, Iron Age hillforts came to be constructed around the boundaries of the plain, including Scratchbury Camp and Battlesbury Camp to the southwest, Bratton Camp to the northwest, Casterley Camp to the north, Yarnbury and Vespasian's Camp to the south, and Sidbury Hill to the east.

Roman roads are visible features, probably serving a settlement near Old Sarum. Villas are sparse, however, and Anglo-Saxon place names suggest that the plain was mostly a grain-producing imperial estate.

In the 6th century, Anglo-Saxon incomers built planned settlements in the valleys surrounded by strip lynchets, with the downland left as sheep pasture. To the south is the city of Salisbury, whose medieval cathedral is famous for having the tallest spire in the country, and the building was, for many centuries, the tallest building in Britain. The cathedral is evidence of the prosperity the wool and cloth trade brought to the area. In the mid-19th century the wool and cloth industry began to decline, leading to a decline in the population and change in land use from sheep farming to agriculture and military use. Wiltshire became one of the poorest counties in England during this period of decline.

There are a number of chalk carvings on the plain, of which the most famous is the Westbury White Horse. The Kennet and Avon Canal was constructed to the north of the plain, through the Vale of Pewsey.

In September 1896, George Kemp and Guglielmo Marconi experimented with wireless telegraphy on Salisbury Plain, and achieved good results over a distance of 1.25 miles (2.0 km).

The British Army first conducted manoeuvres at what is now Salisbury Plain Training Area in 1898.

== Ecology ==
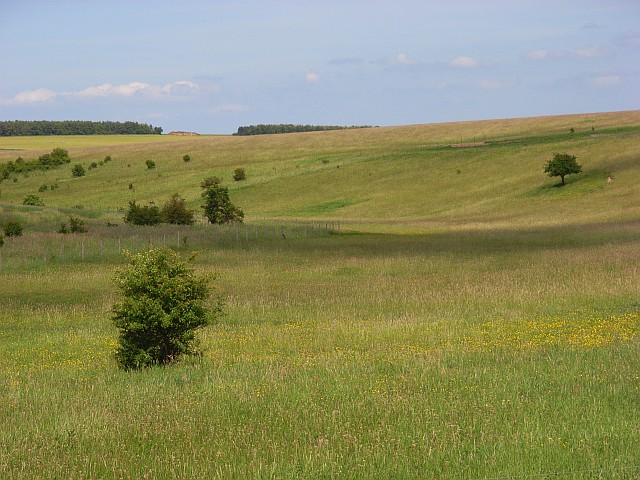
Typical grassland at Netheravon Down

Because of the large training areas inaccessible to the public, the plain is a wildlife haven, and home to two national nature reserves, but there is concern that the low level of grazing on the plain could allow scrub to encroach on the grassland. The plain supports the largest known expanse of unimproved chalk downland in north west Europe, and represents 41% of Britain's remaining area of this wildlife habitat. The plain supports 13 species of nationally rare and scarce plants, 67 species of rare and scarce invertebrates and forms a site of international importance for birds. In addition to chalk downland, the plain supports scrub and woodland habitats, temporary and permanent pools and the River Bourne.

=== Vegetation ===
A diversity of soil types, slope, aspect and past and present land-use has given rise to various grassland communities. Historical evidence suggests that large areas of grassland are of great antiquity, and areas which were cultivated at the beginning of the 20th century have experienced nearly 100 years of chalk grassland re-colonization. Parts of East Salisbury Plain and the periphery of Central and West comprise areas of grassland currently managed for grazing pasture and hay-cutting, whilst the middle of Centre and West are ungrazed. A large proportion of Salisbury Plain supports upright brome (Bromus erectus) species-rich grassland, within which a continuous floristic variation is seen. A widespread type on the plain is characterised by an abundance of red fescue (Festuca rubra), crested hair-grass (Koeleria macrantha), salad burnet (Sanguisorba minor), lady's bedstraw (Galium verum), rough hawkbit (Leontodon hispidus), common rock-rose (Helianthemum nummularium) and dropwort (Filipendula vulgaris). The high constancy of this last species is a distinctive feature of the upright brome grasslands on Salisbury Plain and is otherwise only known from one other site in Hampshire. Where upright brome is less dominating, plants such as small scabious (Scabiosa columbaria), clustered bellflower (Campanula glomerata), dyer's greenweed (Genista tinctoria), kidney vetch (Anthyllis vulneraria), sainfoin (Onobrychis viciifolia) and horseshoe vetch (Hippocrepis comosa) are characteristic associates.

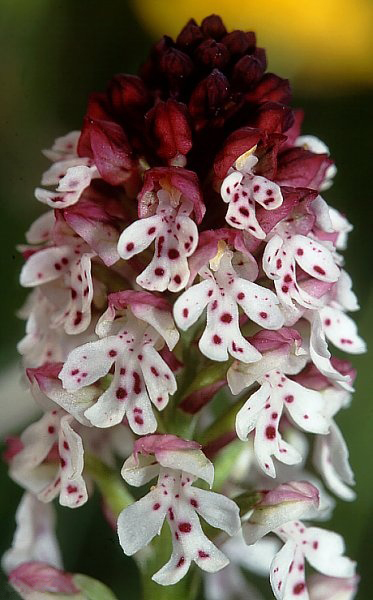
The burnt-tip orchid (Neotinea ustulata) can be found on Salisbury Plain

The rare and notable plants which occur here include burnt-tip orchid (Neotinea ustulata), slender bedstraw (Galium pumilum), field fleawort (Senecio integrifolius) and the nationally scarce British endemic early gentian (Gentianella anglica). Particularly associated with long established turf on thin rendzina soils, and rabbit-grazed areas of the eastern and central ranges, are low-growing perennials including squinancy-wort (Asperula cynanchica), chalk milkwort (Polygala calcarea), dwarf thistle (Cirsium acaule), wild thyme (Thymus praecox), the nationally scarce bastard toadflax (Thesium humifusum) and purple milk-vetch (Astragalus danicus) in its most southerly British station.

Devil's-bit scabious (Succisa pratensis), saw-wort (Serratula tinctoria) and betony (Stachys officinalis) are all abundant and exemplify the oceanic character of the chalk grassland on the plain, a feature which is confined to South West England. Similarly restricted is a community in which dwarf sedge Carex humilis forms a conspicuous component. This type of grassland has its stronghold in Wiltshire and occurs on the less disturbed areas of the central ranges. Herb diversity is generally lower in the tall, upright brome-dominated swards, but wild parsnip (Pastinaca sativa), hogweed (Heracleum sphondylium) and greater knapweed (Centaurea scabiosa) are characteristic. Parasitic on the latter species is knapweed broomrape (Orobanche elatior), occurring in greater quantity on the plain than anywhere else in Britain. False-oat grass (Arrhenatherum elatius) grassland is also widespread, but is particularly a feature of the western ranges, often indicating areas of past cultivation.

On anthills, and in the more disturbed turf that is especially a feature of the impact area, mouse-ear hawkweed (Hieracium pilosella) is abundant together with sheep's fescue (Festuca ovina) and wild thyme. Annuals are also characteristic of this habitat, including common whitlowgrass (Erophila verna), rue-leaved saxifrage (Saxifraga tridactylites,) hairy rock-cress (Arabis hirsuta) and the nationally scarce dwarf mouse-ear (Cerastium pumilum) and fine-leaved sandwort (Minuartia hybrida). A very local community characterised by a lichen-rich turf (Cladonia species) and the broom moss (Dicranum scoparium) is found in some stabilised missile-impaction craters on the central ranges. This vegetation type is found elsewhere only on Porton Down SSSI and on the Brecklands.

Small areas of chalk-heath vegetation occur on superficial clay-with-flints deposits. Here chalk-loving plants such as salad burnet (Sanguisorba minor) and dropwort co-exist with plants typical of acid soils, including gorse (Ulex europaeus), heather (Calluna vulgaris) and the uncommon annual knawel (Scleranthus annuus). Two Red Data Book (RDB) plants occur on the plain. The largest population in Britain of tuberous thistle (Cirsium tuberosum) occurs on the western ranges and is notable for the low incidence of hybridisation with dwarf thistle, a contributory cause of its decline in other localities. Meadow clary (Salvia pratensis) persists as a small colony in tall upright brome grassland.

Salisbury Plain supports a diverse bryophyte flora with seven nationally scarce species which have seen a general decline in other chalk grassland sites, including Barbula acuta, Phascum curvicolle, Pleurochaete squarrosa, Thuidium abietinum and Weissia sterilis.

Although there is some scrub development on the plain, it is remarkable that large expanses of the chalk grassland remain open with very little invasion of woody species. Of particular interest are the large stands of juniper (Juniperus communis) on Bulford Downs and Beacon Hill. Both pyramidal and prostrate forms are present and this site, along with Porton Down SSSI to the south, supports the best remaining examples of the lowland type of juniper associated with chalk and mixed scrub in England.

=== Insects ===
The botanically and structurally diverse grasslands support a large range of rare and uncommon chalk downland invertebrates. Where abundance has been assessed strong populations of national and local importance are present, and the large area of habitat available to them is important in ensuring their survival.

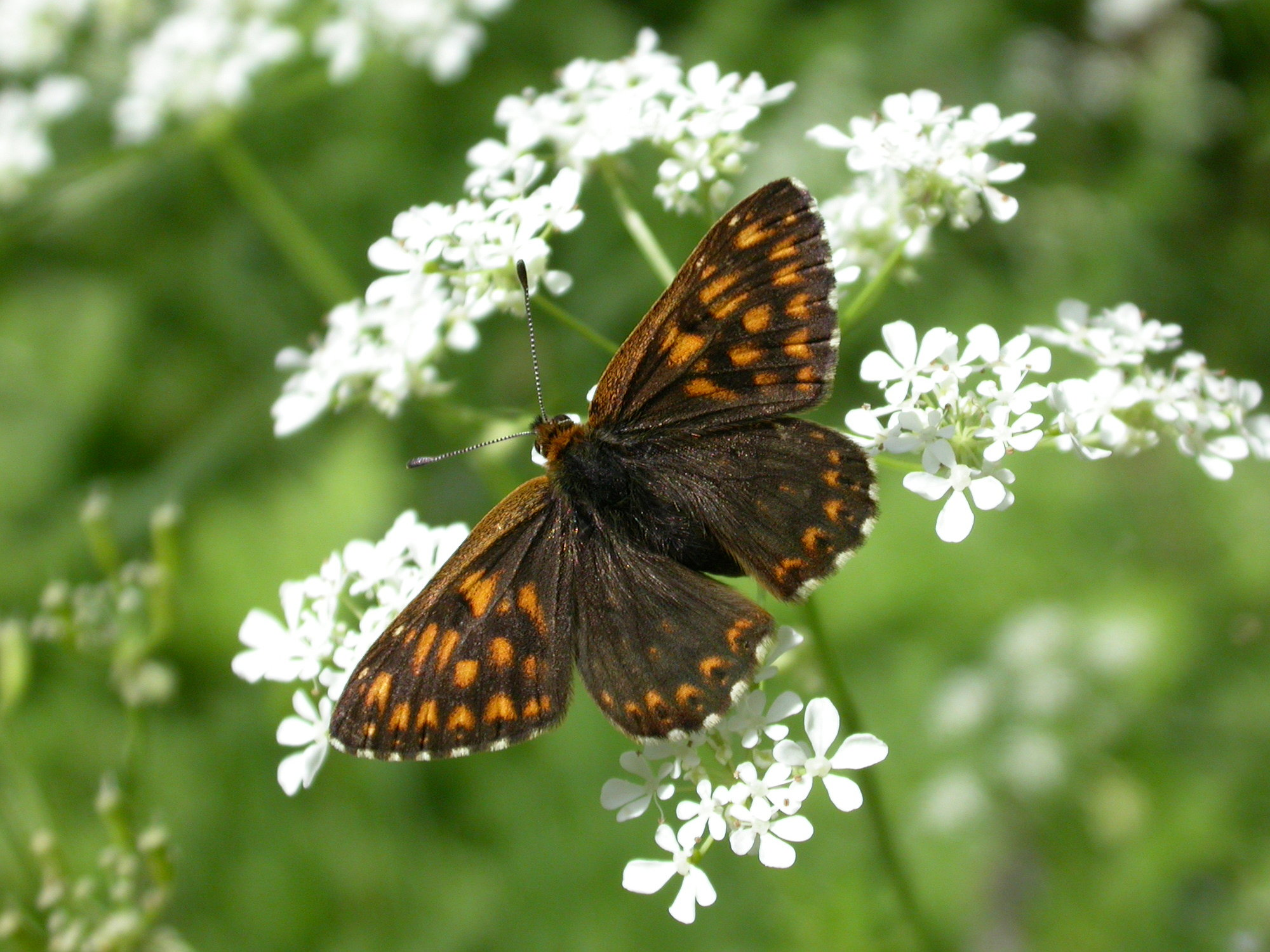
The Duke of Burgundy butterfly (Hamearis lucina)

==== Butterflies ====
The plain is an important stronghold for declining downland butterflies. A high concentration of colonies of three nationally scarce species, the Adonis blue (Polyommatus bellargus), Duke of Burgundy (Hamearis lucina), and the largest population of marsh fritillary (Euphydryas aurinia) on the chalk, occur. A colony of brown hairstreak (Thecla betulae) is present on East Salisbury Plain at one of its two Wiltshire localities. Strong populations of other downland species such as chalkhill blue (Polyommatus coridon) and dark green fritillary (Argynnis aglaja) are found, and of note here is the occurrence of grayling (Hipparchia semele), a butterfly rarely found away from the coast.

==== Moths ====
An outstanding assemblage of two rare (RDB), 36 nationally scarce and two regionally notable moths are present, most of which are either chalk grassland specialists or are partly dependent on chalk grassland. The RDB species scarce forester (Adscita globulariae) is present, and amongst many species of nationally scarce moths are the cistus forester (Adscita geryon), six-belted clearwing (Bembecia scopigera), oblique striped (Phibalapteryx virgata), pimpernel pug (Eupithecia pimpinellata), shaded pug (Eupithecia subumbrata) and narrow-bordered bee hawk moth (Hemaris tityus). Larvae of these moths feed on the chalk grassland plants which are widespread on the plain. Other nationally scarce moths such as orange-tailed clearwing (Synanthedon anthraciniformis) depend on the associated scrub habitats.

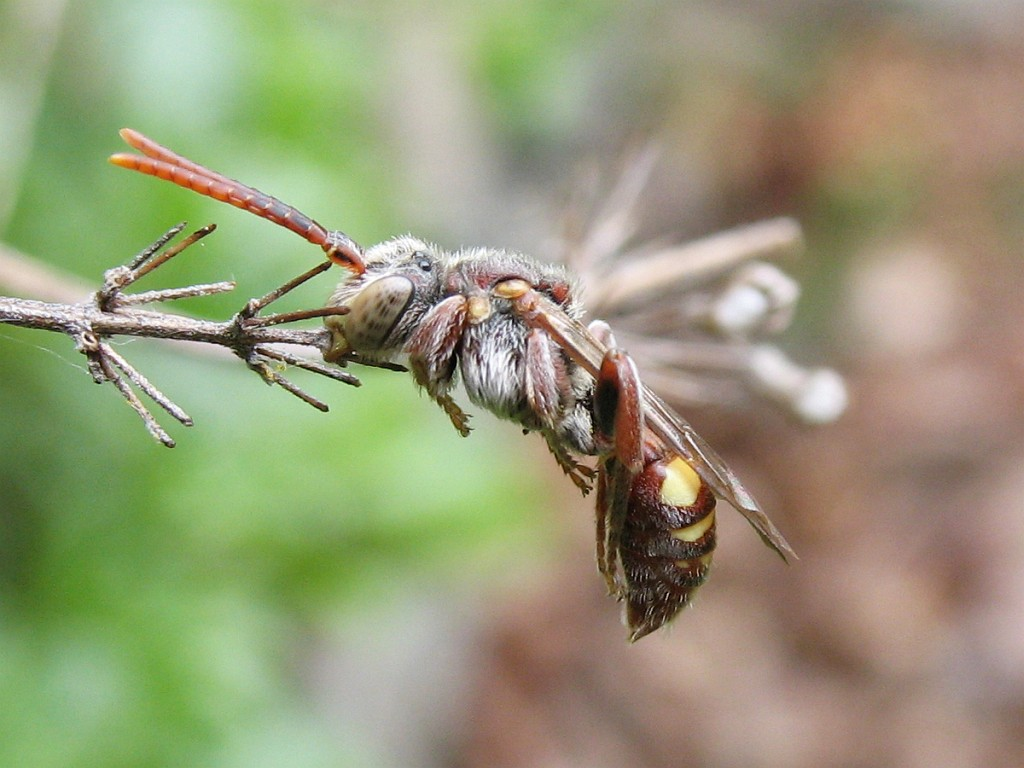
The cuckoo bee Nomada armata

==== Bees ====
The bee fauna is particularly rich in species which depend on chalk grassland. One of only two British populations of the endangered (RDB) mining bee Melitta dimidiata is present on the plain, and two other RDB species which occur are Andrena hattorfiana and its nest parasite the cuckoo bee Nomada armata. This is a rare inland site for the nationally scarce brown-banded carder bee (Bombus humilis), and the only lowland English site for the broken-belted bumblebee (Bombus soroeensis).

==== Flies ====
The Diptera (flies) include four RDB species which depend on chalk grassland, the picture-wing flies Chaetorellia loricata, Urophora solstitialis and Terellia vectensis and the hover fly Volucella inflata.

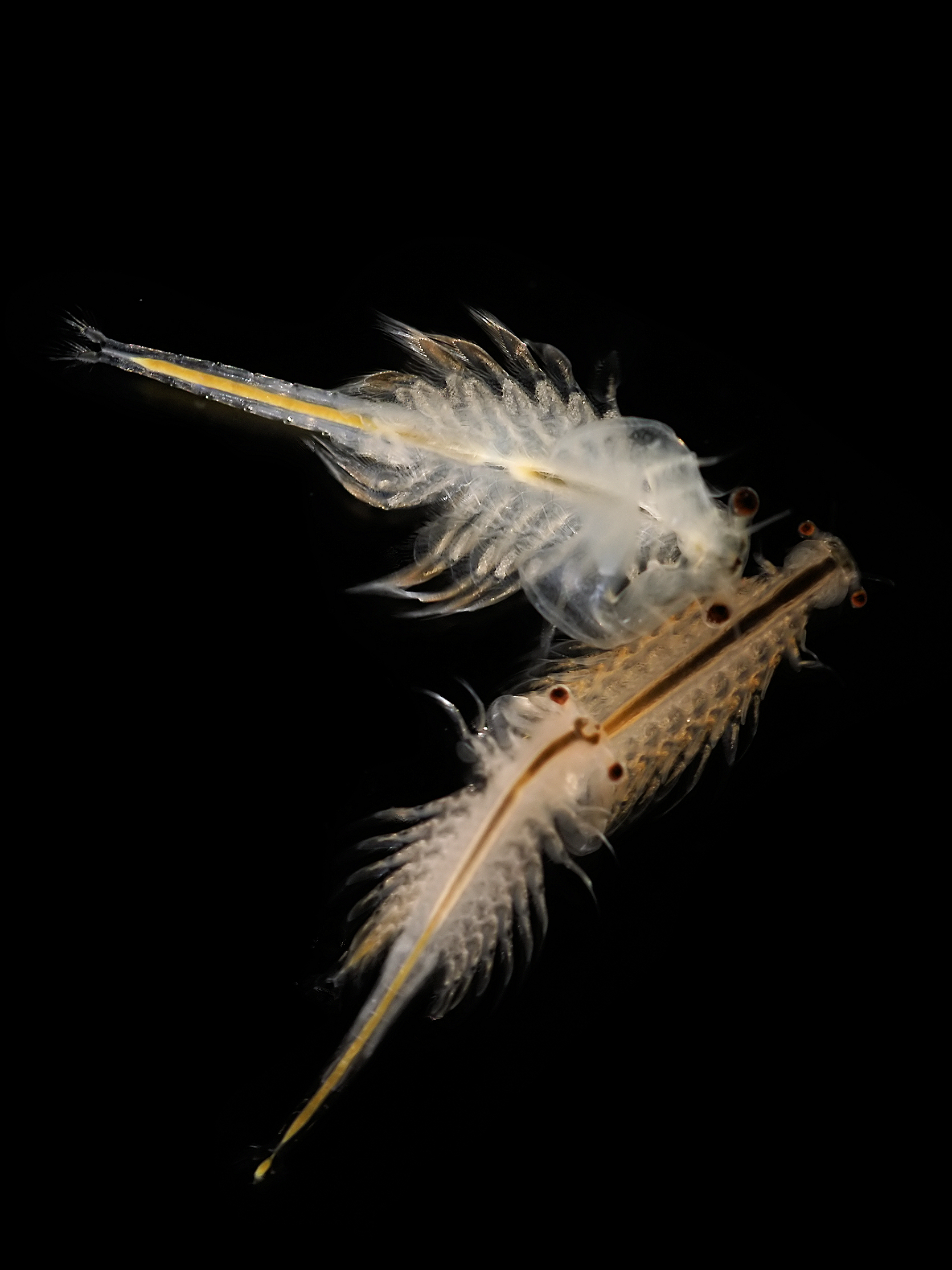
The fairy shrimp Chirocephalus diaphanus

==== Crustaceans ====
Recent observations have shown that Salisbury Plain is an important site for the RDB crustacean, the fairy shrimp Chirocephalus diaphanus which is dependent on temporary pools, a rare and declining habitat. On the plain this habitat requirement is met by numerous pools created by repeated tank movements along the earth tracks which cross the chalk grassland.

==== Others ====
Other nationally scarce invertebrates occur within the Orthoptera (grasshoppers and crickets), Heteroptera (bugs) and Coleoptera (beetles), the latter group including a RDB soldier beetle, Cantharis fusca.

=== Birds ===
The area as a whole is of national and international importance for breeding and wintering birds. It supports seven species listed on Annex 1 of the EC Directive on the Conservation of Wild Birds, populations of six species of Red Data bird and several species of candidate Red Data bird. Amongst the breeding birds three species are particularly noteworthy. Up to 20 pairs of stone-curlew representing 12% of the British population breed on the plain. The area accounts for approximately 20% of breeding records for quail in Britain each year, and numbers of breeding hobby are thought to exceed 1% of the British population on a regular basis. Other important breeding species include common buzzard, barn owl, long-eared owl, nightingale, stonechat, whinchat, wheatear, corn bunting and, on occasion, Montagu's harrier.

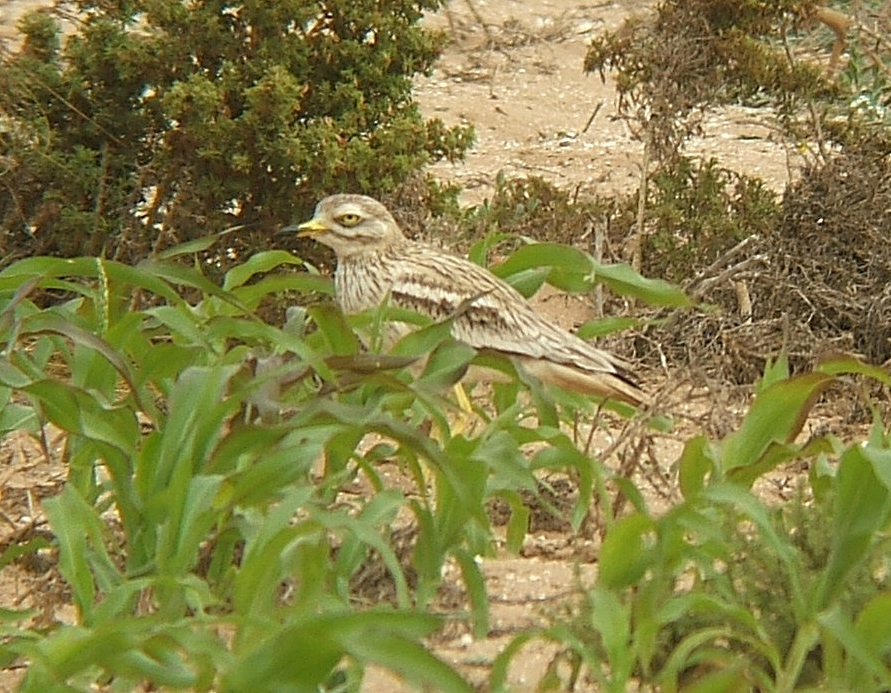
The stone curlew

The overall breeding assemblage is exceptionally diverse for a British dry grassland site. In winter the plain is an important area for foraging flocks of thrushes, finches and buntings. These, together with abundant small mammals are prey for wintering hen harrier, merlin and short-eared owl. Hen harriers occur in nationally significant numbers each winter, and the plain is an important winter roost for this species in southern England. In 2003 the great bustard was reintroduced into Britain on Salisbury Plain.

=== Snakes and amphibians ===
Other species of interest on Salisbury Plain include the great crested newt (Triturus cristatus). This newt occurs in dew ponds across the plain and in pools along the Bourne River, together with smooth newt (Triturus vulgaris), common frog (Rana temporia) and common toad (Bufo bufo). Barred grass snake (Natrix helvetica) are also often seen near pools, and common lizard (Lacerta vivipara), slowworm (Anguis fragilis) and adder (Vipera berus) are present.

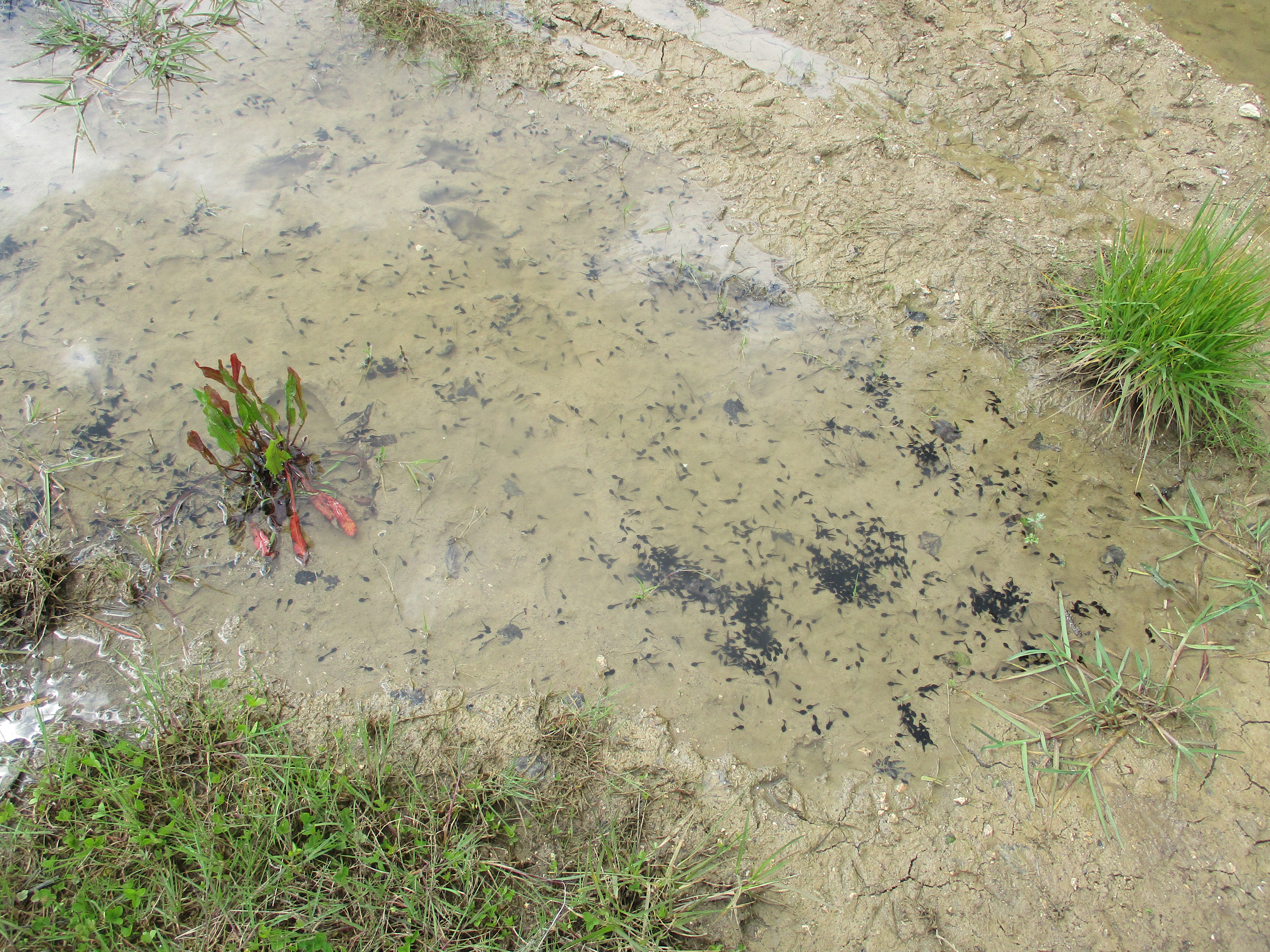
Common Toad tadpoles on Salisbury Plain

== In popular culture ==
The folk song Roud 1487 is titled "Salisbury Plain". The song appears on Martin Carthy's 1969 album Prince Heathen.

== See also ==
- Geology of Great Britain
