= Yarty =

Historic estate in Devon, England

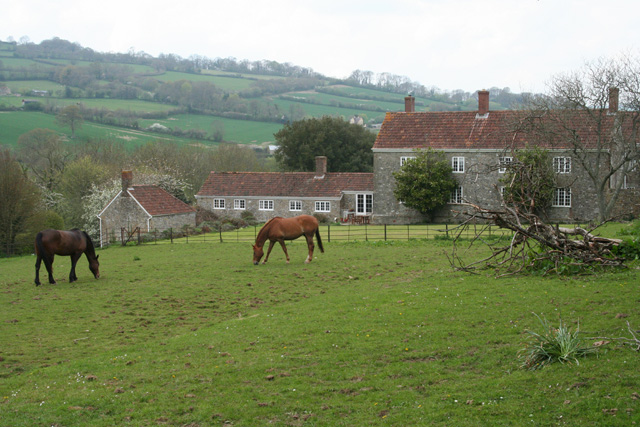
Yarty Farm today. The old mansion house of the Fry family burned down in about 1850.

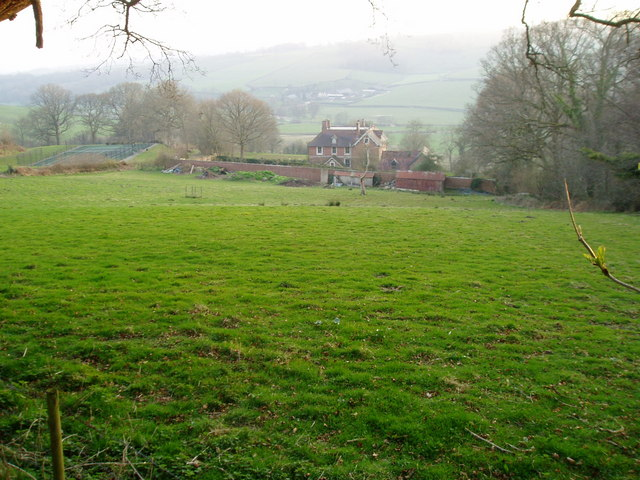
Yarty, setting

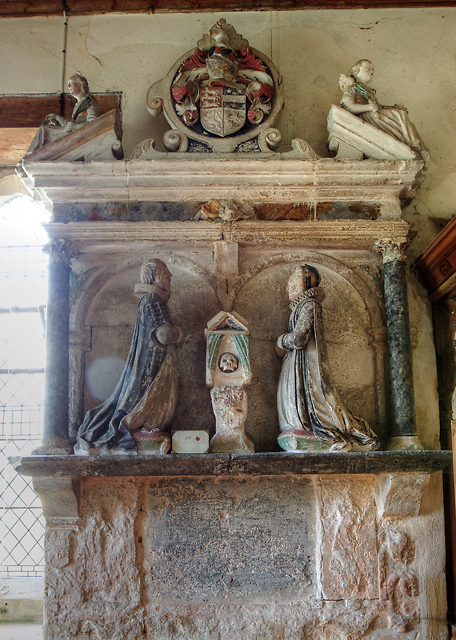
Mural monument in the Yarty Chapel of St John's Church, Membury, Devon, to Nicholas Fry (d.1632) of Yarty, Sheriff of Devon in 1626. He kneels opposite his wife, who had predeceased him, Ellinor Brett (d.1620/1), daughter of John Brett of Whitstanton, Somerset (ancestor of Brett, Viscount Esher).

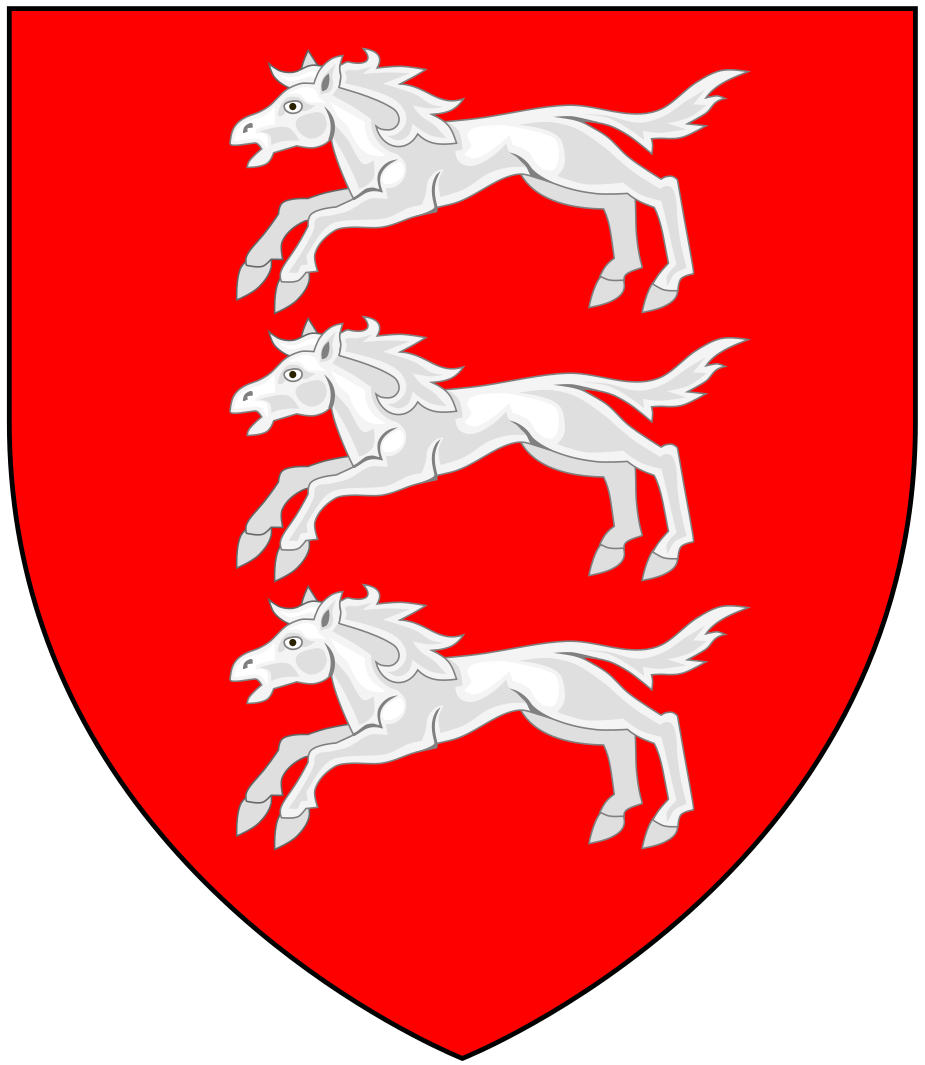
Arms of Fry: Gules, three horses courant in pale argent

Yarty is an historic estate in the parish of Membury in Devon, and was from the 14th century until 1726 for many centuries the principal seat of the Fry family. It takes its name from the River Yarty which flows near or through the estate. During the reigns of King Richard II (1377-1399) or King Henry IV (1399-1413) William (or John) Fry inherited the estate by marriage to the sister and heiress of Simon de Yarty, who died without progeny. The mansion house was "newly builded and augmented" by Nicholas Fry (d.1632), Sheriff of Devon in 1626, whose mural monument survives in the Yarty Chapel in Membury Church.

The following text appeared in "Report & Transactions of the Devonshire Association Vol 39 (1907)" p. 134:

The old house was burnt down between fifty and sixty years ago. Terraces, gardens, and fishponds can still be traced, and at the top of a flight of stairs in the present garden is a horse's head, the crest of the Frys, carved in stone. Local tradition says that after "Squire Fry" — the last of his race, I believe — was buried the funeral party upon returning home found him sitting in the chimney corner! He was "conjured" into the withy bed, whence he was "condemned to go back at the rate of a 'cock's stride' each year"! Where he is now I do not know, but a version of the story states that when the house was burnt down the dove-cot remained untouched, for the "Squire" was there! But here the wing of the popular imagination droops, and what became of him when the dove-cot was finally pulled down is not recorded!

The story of the ghost returning home "at the rate of a cock's stride each year" also occurs in Devon in relation to Dowrich an historic estate in the parish of Sandford.
