= A303 road =

Trunk road in southern England

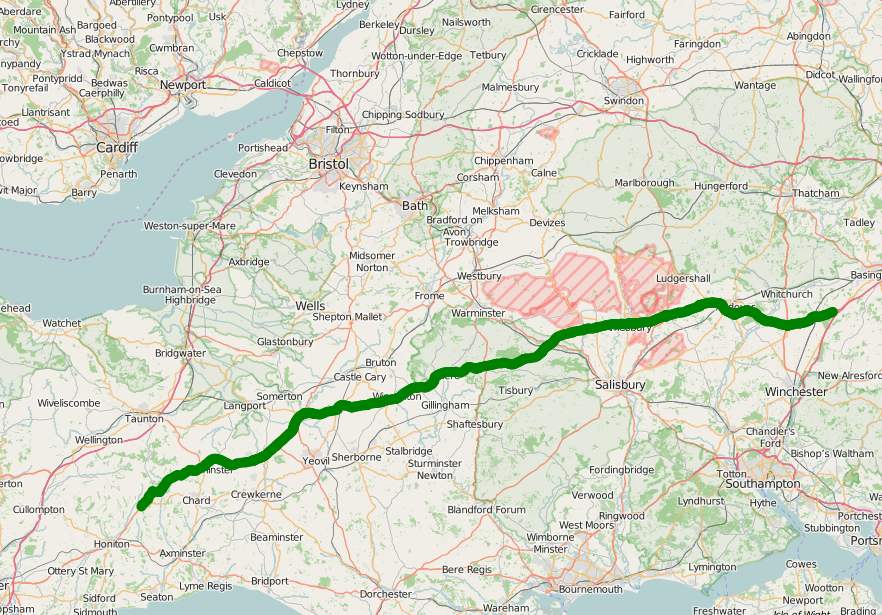
- Route of the A303 across southern England

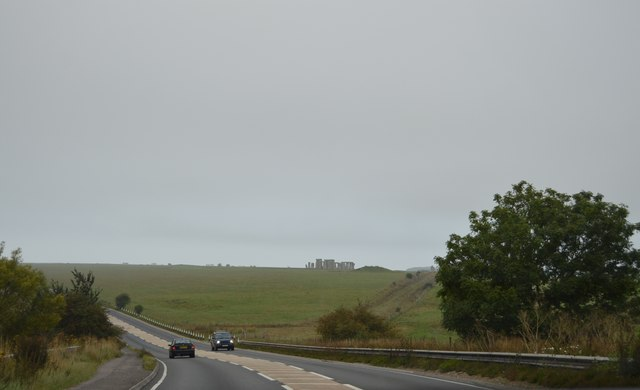
- The A303 in Wiltshire, with Stonehenge in the background

Route information
- Maintained by National Highways
- Length: 93 mi (150 km)
- History: 1819 (as the New Direct Road); 1933 (as the A303)
- Known for: Stonehenge road tunnel (proposed)

Major junctions
- Northeast end: Basingstoke
- M3; A34; A338; Stonehenge; A36; A350; A37; A3088; A358; A30
- To: Honiton

Location
- Country: United Kingdom
- Counties: Hampshire, Wiltshire, Dorset, Somerset, Devon
- Primary destinations: Andover; Salisbury; Warminster; Yeovil

Road network
- Roads in the United Kingdom; Motorways; A and B road zones

The A303 is a trunk road in southern England, running between Basingstoke in Hampshire and Honiton in Devon via Stonehenge. Connecting the M3 and the A30, it is part of one of the main routes from London to Devon and Cornwall. It is a primary A road throughout its length, passing through five counties.

The road has evolved from historical routes, some of which are thousands of years old, including the Harrow Way and the Fosse Way. The modern route was first laid out in the early 19th century as the New Direct Road, a faster coaching route from London to Exeter. It was initially in demand but fell into disuse as railways became popular from the 1840s onwards. It was not thought of as a significant through route when roads were initially numbered, but was revived as a major road in 1933, eventually becoming a trunk road in 1958. Since then, the A303 has gradually been upgraded to modern standards, though there are still several unimproved parts with longstanding plans to fix them.

As a primary route to southwestern England, the A303 is frequently congested on its single carriageway sections. It passes through the Stonehenge World Heritage Site and the Blackdown Hills Area of Outstanding Natural Beauty, and attempts to upgrade the road in those areas have been controversial. In particular, the Stonehenge tunnel, which would see the A303 rerouted underground, has been proposed and delayed several times. Nevertheless, the road remains a popular alternative to motorway driving.

== Route ==
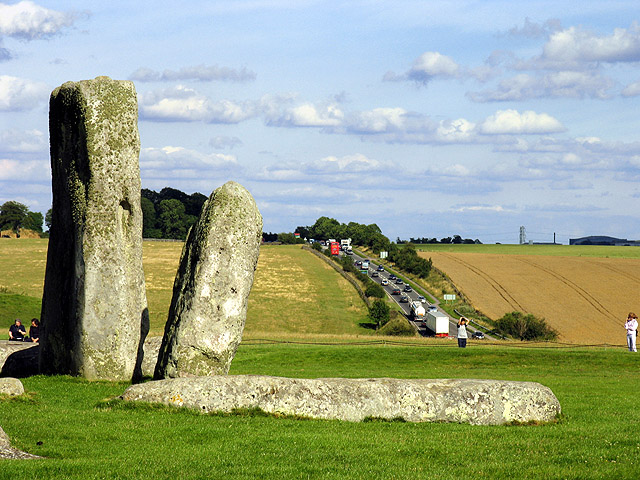
Part of Stonehenge, with the A303 in the background

The A303 is about 93 miles (150 km) long. It starts at the M3 motorway south of Basingstoke at Junction 8, as a dual carriageway. It heads south-west, crossing the A34 near Bullington (Note: The Bullington Cross Inn originally sat at a crossroads here. Popular in the 19th and 20th centuries, it was demolished in the early 21st and the site is now a recycling yard.) before passing south of Andover. The road then passes by Solstice Park and Bulford Camp before bypassing Amesbury and entering the Stonehenge World Heritage Site. The route then becomes single carriageway before passing Stonehenge itself. The presence of the road through a World Heritage Site has been controversial for decades. As part of a long-term strategy to restore a natural landscape around Stonehenge, the A344 road which once joined the A303 at Stonehenge has been removed, following the removal of other features over the last century including the Stonehenge Aerodrome which used to span the A303 around 500 metres (1,600 ft) west of the henge.

After Winterbourne Stoke the route once again becomes dual carriageway from Yarnbury Castle and across the Wylye valley, meeting the A36 at Deptford. There is then another section of single carriageway road, coming out of the valley and up to the crest of the Great Ridge, before a further section of dual down from the hill crest near Berwick St Leonard. On reaching the valley, it reverts again to single carriageway through the village of Chicklade, before following the terrain over to Mere, where it runs north of the town as another dual carriageway bypass. Continuing west, it passes south of Wincanton, then north of Sparkford before bypassing Ilchester and RNAS Yeovilton. Between Ilchester and Shores Bridge (over the River Parrett, east of South Petherton) the road follows the course of the Roman Fosse Way. At Yeovilton the road connects with the A37 which joins it until it reaches the end of the bypass. The dual carriageway ends at South Petherton. It runs north of Ilminster as a three-lane single carriageway where it meets the A358, providing access to the M5 motorway.

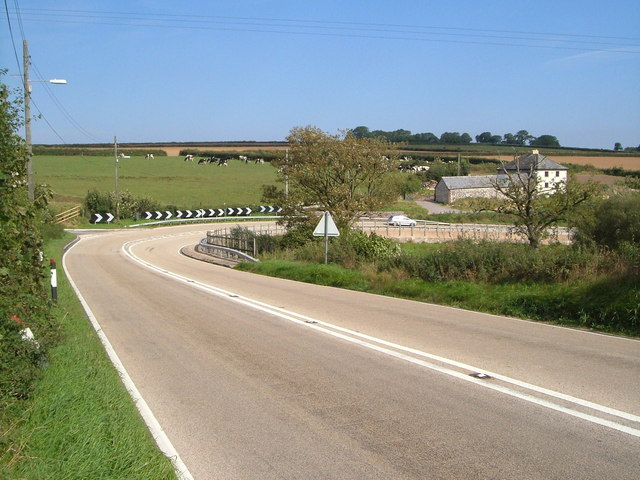
The western end of the A303 is a lower standard of road through the Blackdown Hills

The A303 is of a lower standard west of Ilminster. It passes through the Blackdown Hills as a narrow road following the contours of the land, with the exception of a dual-carriageway bypass of Marsh. The road ends joining the A30 at the Devonshire Inn junction. Devon County Council has stated the road is about 60% of a modern standard, while the remainder is unimproved.

The A303 roughly parallels the route of the West of England line, a railway line also connecting London with Honiton. Although the A303 as a whole is designed to be part of a route from London to Exeter, a popular alternative is to take the M4 motorway to Bristol, followed by the M5. This is a high-quality motorway route throughout, but a considerably longer distance.

== History ==
=== Early history ===
Parts of the A303, such as the section past Stonehenge, have been a right of way for people, wagons, and later motor vehicles for millennia. Portions of it follow the Harrow Way, an ancient trackway across Wessex that is one of Britain's oldest roads, reportedly being used as long ago as 3,000 BC. Other sections run on part of the Fosse Way, a Roman road between Exeter and Lincoln constructed around 49 AD.

A section of the A303 around Weyhill, west of Andover, runs alongside a ditch thought to be constructed during the Bronze Age. Several historic roads converged at Weyhill, which is believed to have hosted a popular market since the Middle Ages, eventually becoming one of the most important in England by the 19th century. (Note: The once-popular working class custom of wife selling was thought to be practiced regularly at Weyhill.) The market closed in the 1950s.

=== 19th century ===
The modern course of the A303 was designed in the early 19th century as the "New Direct Road" by William Hanning, chief engineer of the Ilminster Turnpike Trust, in order to improve coaching traffic to southwest England. Russells of Exeter began a coach service along it, though they quickly reverted to the older coaching route further south (now part of the A30). Along with engineer Goldsworthy Gurney, Hanning attempted to design a steam-powered coach that could be run along the New Direct Road. After an experimental round trip to Bath, he invested £10,000 in steam carriages. Sir Charles Dance bought three carriages for trips between Cheltenham and Gloucester, but traditional horse-operated stagecoach operators sabotaged the route and Hanning's carriages did not gain widespread adoption. Nevertheless, the New Direct Road became increasingly used as a coaching route between London and Exeter in the 1820s. Ann Nelson's "Exeter Telegraph", a coach from London to Devon via the New Direct Road, could travel from Piccadilly to Devonport in a little over 21 hours. It remained a popular coaching route until the arrival of railways in the 1840s.

The widespread adoption of railways during railway mania caused coaching services to dry up. Along with many other turnpike routes, the New Direct Road fell into disrepair during the 19th century owing to a lack of funds and available staff. By the turn of the 20th century, it had become little more than a rough track in places, making it difficult to drive on.

=== 20th century ===
The A303 near Stonehenge c.1930. Sign reads "Fork left for Exeter". The houses and AA phone box have since been demolished. The road to the right was the A344.

Road designations were first allocated by the Ministry of Transport in the early 1920s, but the New Direct Road was not initially considered a major through route. Instead, the older coaching road further south via Salisbury and Yeovil was determined to be the main road. Maps produced by companies independent to the Ordnance Survey, the Government's official mapping body, marked the New Direct Road as a "class I" route anyway.

The A303 was created on 1 April 1933 as the "Alternative London – Exeter route" after the Ministry of Transport realised the New Direct Road was still useful as a major road for motor traffic. The route created a long bypass for sections of the A30 that ran south of it. (Note: From east to west, the old route numbers were B3379, B3049, A342, A344, A3036, A358 and A3079.)

In 1958, the Ministry of Transport upgraded the A303 to trunk road status. It believed it was easier to upgrade than the parallel A30 as it passed through fewer towns. Initial improvements to the road in the 1960s included widening small sections to three lanes (forming the so-called suicide lane) or to dual carriageway; but none were longer than 2 miles (3.2 km). Andover and Amesbury were bypassed in 1969, while general improvements to the road, including additional dualling, took place throughout the 1970s.

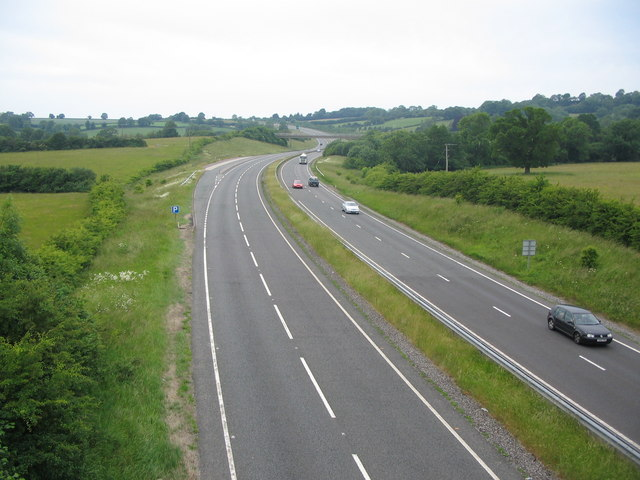
Parts of the A303 were upgraded to dual carriageway throughout the late 20th century.

In 1971, the Environment Secretary, Peter Walker announced the entire length of the A303 would be upgraded as part of a new roads programme that would deliver 1,000 new miles of motorway by 1980. Bypasses were built, such as the one at Wylye in July 1975. A bypass of Marsh, Devon was opened in 1976; it was (and remains) the only dual carriageway upgrade of the A303 through the Blackdown Hills. The section between Wincanton and Holton opened in stages throughout 1977, costing £3m.

By the mid-1980s, the A303 had been extended from its original fork by Micheldever Station, next to the A30, eastwards to meet the M3 motorway, and was an uninterrupted dual carriageway westwards as far as Amesbury. A bypass of Ilminster had been planned since 1976, but by 1982 the Transport Secretary David Howell had rejected the original dual carriageway plans, calling them "'a waste of money". The new road was built as single carriageway with three lanes, which caused a serious safety hazard leading to several fatal accidents. A bypass of Sparkford was opened on 25 October 1989 by Robert Atkins (politician), while an upgrade to the South Petherton to Ilchester section was opened by Christopher Chope on 13 December 1990.

=== 21st century ===
In 2013, after decades of debate, the A303's junction with the A344, just east of Stonehenge, was closed as part of improvements to visitor facilities. During this work, a roadside monument was moved to the visitor centre; the stone monument is to Captain Eustace Loraine and Staff-Sergeant Richard Wilson, killed in July 1912 in the first fatal accident of the recently formed Royal Flying Corps.

Plans to improve the A303 between Sparkford and Ilchester by upgrading three miles of single carriageway to high-quality dual carriageway were approved by the government in February 2021. Work began on this section that October, and the scheme opened in November 2024.

== Traffic ==
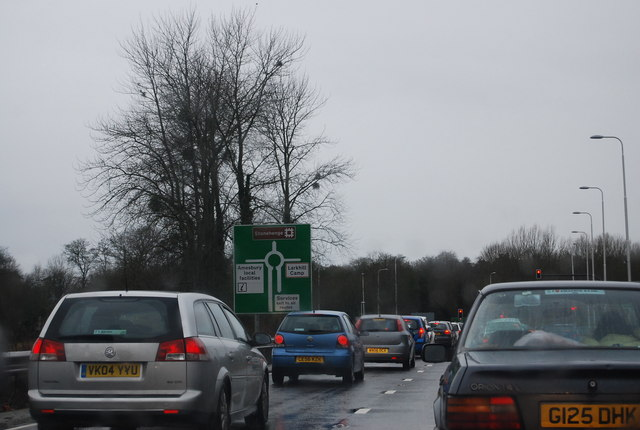
Traffic and congestion is a regular problem along the A303, particularly near Stonehenge.

Since the 1950s, the A303 has been criticised for being inadequate for the level of traffic along it. In 1959, it was reported that a typical queue for holiday traffic along the road could be as much as 15 miles (24 km). As of 2024, over 35 miles (56 km) of the road west of Amesbury remains single carriageway, interrupted by various sections of dual carriageway. The switches from the latter to the former act as bottlenecks and are major sources of congestion along the route. Upgrading the remaining sections of road is difficult due to environmental concerns; in 1986, an upgrade of the A303 in Hampshire caused public outcry after the work destroyed the remains of an Iron Age settlement, and consequently, £100,000 was spent on emergency rescue excavation work.

In 2017, Devon County Council criticised the section through the Blackdown Hills, as it did not meet modern traffic standards. Particular criticism was directed at steep gradients, narrow lanes and sharp turns, which contribute to lower average traffic speeds, and a lack of lay-bys and verges that cause significant congestion in the event of a vehicle breakdown. The report also noted that a significant proportion of weekday traffic was on business (37%, while the typical figure was 7%), but with a much larger traffic flow on weekends.

The A303 is particularly congested during the Summer solstice (around 21 June) when Stonehenge forms a major part of festivities. On 1 June 1985 (the "Battle of Stonehenge"), a 10-mile (16 km) roadblock was placed in the local area. In 1988 a van overturned on the A303 after leaving a clash with police at Stonehenge, killing one passenger and injuring ten others. The A303 is also part of one of the main routes from London to the Glastonbury Festival. During the weekend of the festival in late June, the road is generally gridlocked as people drive towards or away from the festival grounds in Pilton, Somerset.

A Road Investment Strategy published by the UK government in 2014 committed to upgrading all the remaining single-carriageway sections of the A303 as far as Ilminster. Highways England have made numerous proposals to improve the road, and in 2016 it was identified under several Nationally Significant Infrastructure Projects.

== Future ==
=== Stonehenge area ===
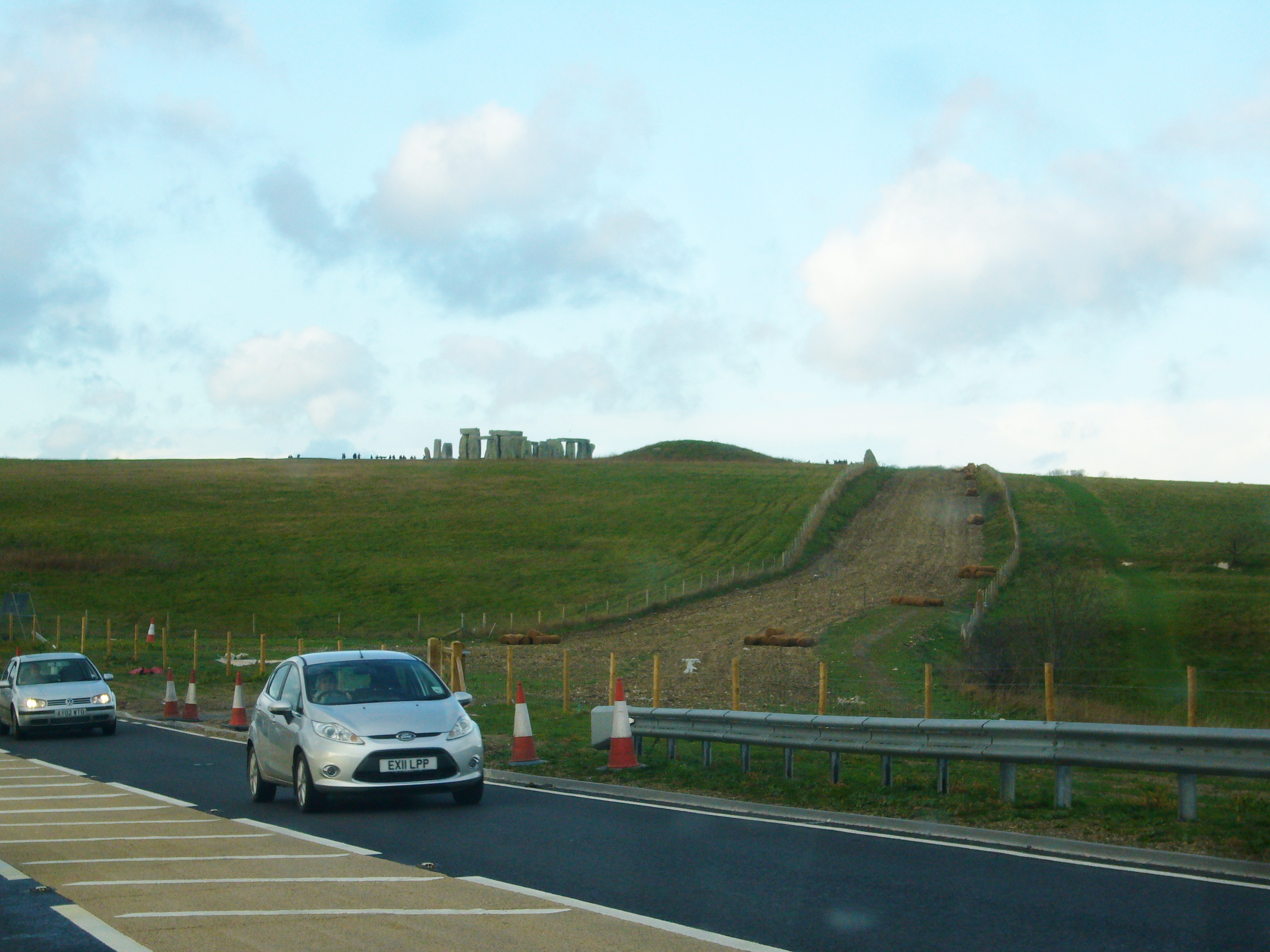
After years of deliberation, the A344 junction with the A303 by Stonehenge was closed and returned to nature.

The most controversial upgrade of the A303 has been improvement to the road through the Stonehenge World Heritage Site, where it remains a congested single carriageway road. There were minor changes in the 1960s, including closing the road for a month in 1967 for levelling and resurfacing. A proposal to fully dual the A303 past Stonehenge was announced in the mid-1970s, but was criticised as being "an environmental disaster" and comparable to driving a dual carriageway through Westminster Abbey. A more comprehensive solution was discussed in 1989's Roads for Prosperity programme, which included upgrading the road to dual carriageway and bypassing Winterborne Stoke. In 1993, the Minister for Roads, Kenneth Carlisle, announced plans for either a 0.5-kilometre (0.31 mi) tunnel or a diversion of the A303 a mile from Stonehenge, costing £44 million and £22 million respectively. Although the new Labour government cancelled many road schemes after coming to power in 1997, there was still general support for a tunnel at Stonehenge.

"No-one with any sense wanted a tunnel, a flyover, a dual carriageway, and two whacking great interchanges here."

— Save Stonehenge, campaigning against improvements to the A303.

In 2003, 7.7 miles (12.4 km) of improvements, including the proposed 1.3-mile (2.1 km) road tunnel bored under land adjacent to Stonehenge, were announced by the Secretary of State for Transport as part of a package of road upgrades. A public enquiry into whether the plans were adequate was announced; it concluded that they were, despite protests from charities and landowners that the tunnel should be longer. Two years later, it was announced that there was to be a review of the options for Stonehenge, starting in January 2006, as costs had doubled. The government cancelled the whole scheme at the end of 2007 owing to excessive environmental constraints.

In 2016, the Stonehenge tunnel was revived by the Government, who awarded a £17.5m design contract to build a 1.8-mile (2.9 km) tunnel. Local residents were pleased with the news, but a survey suggested 90% still preferred a diversion away from the stones instead. The plan was finalised the following year as part of a £2 billion programme. Transport Secretary Chris Grayling said the improvements would "transform" the A303 and would be important for removing congestion. In November 2020, the plans were confirmed again in a report by Transport Secretary Andrew Stephenson, and endorsed by Highways England. Though the Government said it had carefully listened to all opinions on the tunnel, the decision to proceed was condemned by environmental campaigners.

In July 2021, the tunnel proposals were overturned in the High Court of Justice. A hearing concluded that transport secretary Grant Shapps had "acted irrationally and unlawfully" by backing the project and failed to properly assess the environmental impacts of each asset on the Stonehenge World Heritage Site as required by planning law. Campaigners for the Stonehenge Alliance welcomed the decision, but Historic England expressed frustration over the "missed opportunity to remove the intrusive sight and sound of traffic past the iconic monument". The Department for Transport reinstated the scheme in July 2023, but the campaigners against the tunnel challenged it in December in the High Court. The case was lost the following February, when the court upheld the government's decision. In July 2024, the new Labour government cancelled the scheme.

The village of Winterbourne Stoke is immediately west of the World Heritage Site, and proposals to upgrade the A303 in this area have generally provided a bypass for it. There have also been proposals to build a bypass as a standalone project, without requiring the improvements around Stonehenge.

=== A303/A358 South Petherton to M5 Taunton ===
In November 2004, plans to improve the route through the Blackdown Hills (an Area of Outstanding Natural Beauty) were abandoned in favour of upgrading the A358 from Ilminster to the M5 motorway at Taunton to reduce traffic west of Ilminster. The scheme was the subject of a public consultation in March 2007, and incorporated plans to widen the Ilminster bypass from South Petherton to a dual two-lane road. The plans were shelved in 2009 when it was concluded that the dualling could not be funded from the Regional Funding Allocation for the South West. In 2016, the plans were revived by Highways England, with a final decision expected to be announced the following year.

In 2019, the preferred route of the A358 upgrade was revealed, and in 2020 the government confirmed funding for the A358 scheme and dualling of the A303 between Sparkford and Podimore. The scheme was cancelled in October 2024 by the new Labour government.

=== Other schemes ===
A number of other schemes for the remaining below-standard parts of the A303 were considered in the 1990s, including improvements west of Ilminster towards Marsh, and the single-carriageway section around Yeovilton. These proposals were all cancelled in 1998. The schemes were later remitted to the London to South West and South Wales Multi-Modal Study (SWARMMS), and the conclusion of the report was that all of the schemes east of Ilminster should go ahead; and to avoid building a dual carriageway through the Blackdown Hills the A358 should be upgraded to the M5 at Taunton. In 2009, none were considered to be regional priorities, so no other improvements were likely to be funded in the short term.

In 2016, Devon County Council announced they would self-fund improvements to the A303 between Ilminster and Honiton, which was not included in Highways England's list. The council put together three proposals for alternative routes, with the aim of securing £170 million of Government funding once a preferred route is chosen. The proposals were cancelled in 2020.

== Cultural references ==
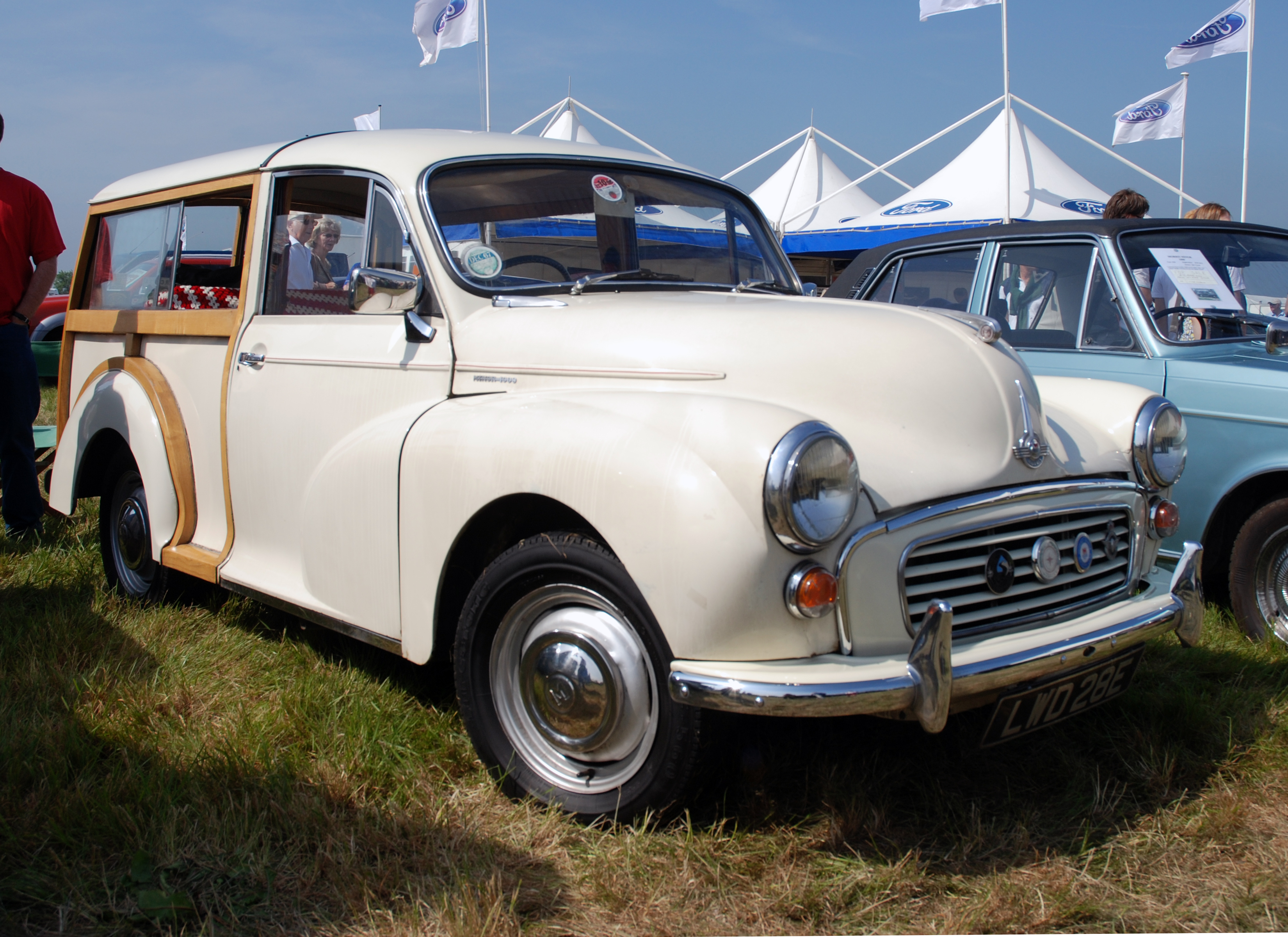
Tom Fort drove the length of the A303 in a Morris Traveller, and his account was turned into a book and television documentary

Kula Shaker performed their first impromptu gig at the Glastonbury Festival, which can be reached via the A303. The road was the inspiration for the song "303" on their debut album K. The road was also mentioned in the Levellers' song "Battle of the Beanfield", about the attack by police on travellers celebrating the Solstice at Stonehenge (1 June 1985): "Down the '303 at the end of the road, Flashing lights, exclusion zones".

Prior to the broadcast of Series 15 of Top Gear in 2010, the cast of Jeremy Clarkson, Richard Hammond and James May were spotted and recorded driving along the A303 in what appeared to be house cars. The video was recorded and put on YouTube.

In 2011, BBC Four broadcast the documentary A303 Highway to the Sun. The writer Tom Fort drove the length of the A303 in a Morris Traveller, making various stops. The following year, he published a book with the same title; it covers the history of the road, and British road planning, together with landscape, history and general travel writing. During research, one interviewee recommended using the A303 to reach southwest England, adding it was "less boring than the motorway, and you've always got Stonehenge". The programme was praised for its eclecticism and enthusiasm for what could have been a tedious subject.

== Junctions and landmarks ==
There are a wide variety of junctions on the A303. These range from motorway-style free-flowing junctions such as that with the A36 near Wylye, to simple forks on the single carriageway sections.

Some junctions, such as the Countess Roundabout with the A345 near Amesbury, and the Podimore roundabout with the A37, are known congestion hotspots because they are insufficient to cope with traffic. Other former junctions, such as the A344 near Stonehenge, have been removed in order to help traffic flow and avoid congestion and accidents.

Distance	Name	Destination
0 miles (0 km)		London, Basingstoke M3 (eastbound only)
South West Main Line
5.9 miles (9.5 km)	Bullington Cross	Newbury, Winchester A34; Stockbridge A30
River Test
River Anton
West of England Main Line
21.5 miles (34.6 km)		Hungerford, Salisbury A338; Marlborough (A346)
25.2 miles (40.6 km)	Solstice Park	Amesbury (E), Bulford
River Avon
26.5 miles (42.6 km)	Countess Roundabout	Salisbury, Amesbury, Pewsey, Upavon, Durrington A345; Devizes (A342)
28.2 miles (45.4 km)		Devizes, Stonehenge A344 (closed in 2013)
Stonehenge
30 miles (48 km)	Long Barrow	Salisbury, Devizes, Stonehenge A360
36 miles (58 km)	Deptford Interchange	Salisbury, Warminster A36
River Wylye
Wessex Main Line
44.7 miles (71.9 km)		Warminster, Blandford A350
Heart of Wessex Line
68.4 miles (110.1 km)	Podimore	Bristol A37; Bath (A39); Langport A372
River Yeo
70.6 miles (113.6 km)		Yeovil; Dorchester A37
73.7 miles (118.6 km)	Cartgate	Yeovil A3088
River Parrett
River Isle
83.3 miles (134.1 km)	Southfields Roundabout	Taunton A358 (north); Chard A358 (south)
River Yarty
93.4 miles (150.3 km)		Honiton, Exeter A30 (westbound); Crewkerne, Chard, Yarcombe A30 (eastbound)
