= Stonehenge road tunnel =

Cancelled road tunnel project in Wiltshire, England

Coordinates: 51.1767°N 1.8265°W

- Location: Wiltshire, England
- Proposer: National Highways
- Project website: https://highwaysengland.co.uk/a303-stonehenge-home/
- Status: Cancelled
- Type: Road tunnel
- Cost estimate: £1.7 billion
- Start date: Proposed (not started)
- Completion date: Cancelled in 2024
- Stakeholders: UK Government; National Highways

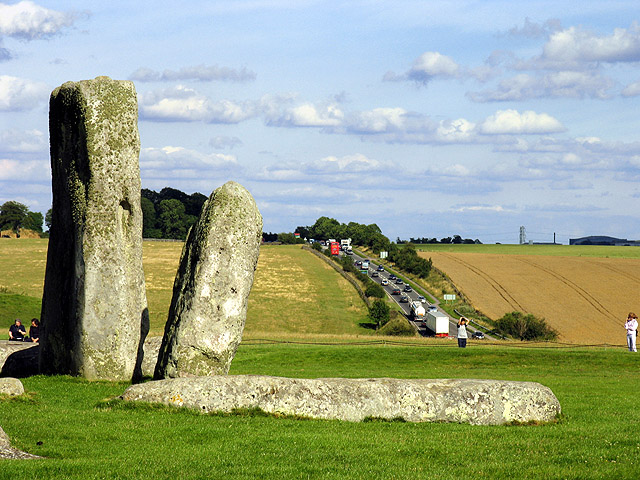
The A303 road passing by Stonehenge

The Stonehenge road tunnel is a proposed tunnel in Wiltshire, England, intended to enclose a section of the A303 beneath part of the Stonehenge World Heritage Site. Various proposals for a tunnel, aiming to remove road traffic from view of the stones, were made from the mid-1990s and remained controversial throughout their development. UNESCO repeatedly raised concerns that the World Heritage Site could be at risk due to the earthworks associated with a tunnel project.

A major proposal developed from 2013 aimed to improve the landscape around the monument while reducing congestion and improving safety on the A303, and formed part of wider changes to the site including relocation of the visitors' centre. The scheme was approved in principle in 2017 and received planning permission in 2020, with an updated consent granted again in 2023. With costs estimated at up to £1.7 billion, the project was cancelled in 2024 following rising costs and a review of public spending. In 2026, the project's Development Consent Order (DCO) was formally revoked, bringing the current scheme to an end.

== Context ==
A map of the world heritage site. The A303 is the horizontal green line that cuts through the centre.

The A303 primary route is one of the main routes from London to South West England. The road is partly dual carriageway but has several low-quality sections, including the single carriageway that passes close to Stonehenge. In 1999, the Highways Agency stated that traffic flows on the A303 between Amesbury and Winterbourne Stoke were above the capacity of the road, and that the number of accidents in the area was above the national average. Between 1991 and 1999, the Highways Agency considered over 50 alternative routes.

The A303 passes just south of Stonehenge, and at the time of the 1999 report the A344 passed just to the north. A pedestrian tunnel under the A344 linked the Stonehenge visitor centre to the site.

== History ==
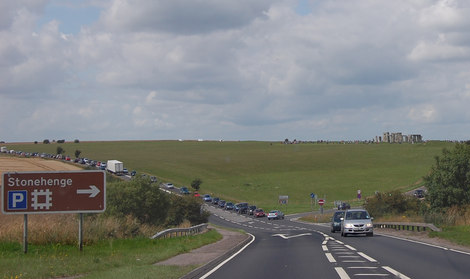
Traffic on the A303

=== 1995 proposal ===
In 1995 it was proposed to build a tunnel for the A303 underneath the World Heritage Site. A conference agreed on a 2.5-mile (4 km) bored tunnel; however, the government instead proposed a cut and cover tunnel, with plans being published in 1999. These plans were criticised by the National Trust, Transport 2000 and others who expressed concern that it would cause damage to archaeological remains along the route, destroy ancient sites and not achieve an improvement in the landscape.

In 2002, new plans for a bored tunnel of 1.3 miles (2.1 km) were announced by the Secretary of State for Transport as part of a 7.7-mile (12.5 km) plan to upgrade the A303 to dual carriageway status, with the tunnel estimated to cost £183 million. This proposal brought further protests from the National Trust, English Heritage, UNESCO, CPRE, the Council for British Archaeology and local groups as the tunnel approach cutting would cut in two a prehistoric track way between Stonehenge and a nearby river. These groups are calling for a tunnel at least 2.9 km long, which would, while being sited within the world heritage site, clear most of the known major artefacts, claiming that if the government goes ahead with the 2.1 km tunnel there may never be another chance to remove the road from the site completely.

In 2004 a public enquiry required under the Highways Act 1980 was conducted by a planning inspector, Michael Ellison. His enquiry agreed that the government proposals were adequate. The report stated:

The physical loss of archaeological remains, the changes to the land form in these sections, and the scale of the new highway would adversely affect the authenticity of the site and more than offset the benefits of the proposed tunnel in the central area. The published scheme would represent the largest earthwork ever constructed within the World Heritage Site; a feature that would contribute nothing to the authenticity.

but concluded:

...after taking into account the requirements of local and national planning, including the requirements of agriculture, that it is expedient for the purpose of improving the A303 between points A and B on the plan referred to in the Line Order for a trunk road to be provided along the route shown in the Line Order

On 20 July 2005 the tunnel scheme was withdrawn by the Government, partly due to rising costs of construction, which had doubled to £470 million. The Highways Agency continued to list the project as planned, but gave 2008 as the earliest date for the start of construction.

=== 2005 proposal ===
On 31 October 2005 a Government steering group was set up to look at possible solutions, with the aim of choosing an "option in keeping with the special requirements of the location that is affordable, realistic and deliverable." The review presented five options – the published tunnel scheme, a cut and cover tunnel, a 'partial solution' (involving a roundabout but maintaining the current road), and two overland bypass routes. Some of these plans have been criticised as being damaging to both archaeology and biodiversity, including the stone curlew, barn owls, bats, and the chalk grassland habitat. Five options were considered including diverting the A303 further away and only closing the A344. The group expected to produce a report in 2006, taking into account the results of public consultation which started on 23 January 2006 and ran until 24 April 2006.

On 6 December 2007, Roads Minister Tom Harris announced that the whole scheme had been cancelled due to increased costs of £540 million. English Heritage expressed disappointment whilst the group Save Stonehenge (now Stonehenge Alliance) were pleased with the outcome. The Highways Agency stated that they would continue to work on small scale improvements to the A303.

=== 2010 proposal and A344 closure ===
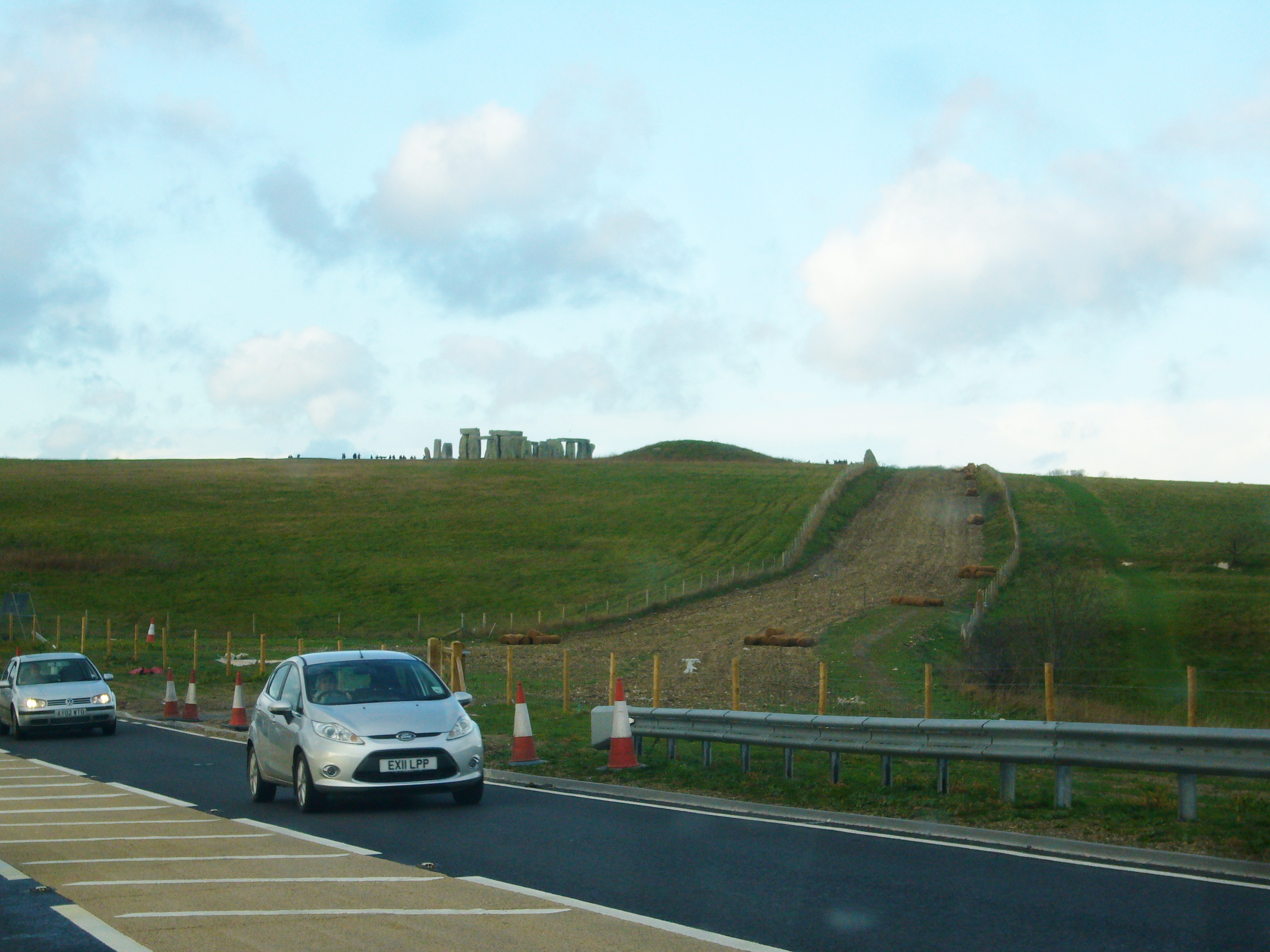
The A344 shortly after closure

A revised proposal, of closing the A344 road between Stonehenge Bottom and Byway 12, and closing part of the B3086, was put forward in 2010. This also proposed a new roundabout to replace the Airman's Corner junction and improvements to the Longbarrow roundabout on the A303.

A planning inquiry to consider the proposal began in June 2011. In July 2012 work began on the £27 million project, which involved the closure and grassing over of part of the A344 and the closing of the underpass beneath the road at the monument entrance. In December 2013 the new visitors' centre at Airman's Corner on the A360 was opened. Shuttle buses take visitors to the monument along the old A344 road, a distance of approximately 2.4 km.

=== 2013 proposal ===
According to documentation released in response to a Freedom of Information request, in January 2012 local councils and the South West Local Enterprise Partnership met to discuss their proposals for "a consortium of Local Authorities to develop and take forward a new scheme for improvements to the A303/ A358/A30" and to "develop an effective lobbying framework so that we can take a planned approach to raising our profile both nationally, regionally and locally". In September 2012 a survey conducted by Somerset County Council found that more than 90% of commuters and businesses in the South West backed an upgrade of the A303. In April 2013 it was reported that the chancellor was giving consideration to "...adding lanes to the A303 – known all too well to holidaymakers – which runs from Basingstoke through Wiltshire (past Stonehenge) and Somerset to the South West of England".

The proposal was given an initial go-ahead by the government on 12 January 2017. The Transport Secretary, Chris Grayling, said that "it will transform the A303, cutting congestion and improving journey times". Chairman of Amesbury Museum and Heritage Trust, Andy Rhind-Tutt, described the tunnel plan as a "self-destructing time bomb" which would "do nothing" for traffic problems in the area. The Stonehenge Alliance campaign group repeated their belief that "any tunnel shorter than 2.7 miles would cause irreparable damage to the landscape". The group also responded with a statement:

We object strongly to the short tunnel scheme and address archaeological, natural environment, landscape and transport considerations. We highlight the incompatibility of the short tunnel project with Government’s commitment to the World Heritage Convention, its own planning guidance and policies, and the widely agreed World Heritage Site Management Plan 2015. We note a number of statements in the Technical Appraisal Report that indicate the scheme cannot be considered ‘value for money’.

Both tunnel portals will lie within the heritage site, and campaigners are concerned that artefacts will be lost during construction. In 2017, a report from UNESCO stated that the tunnel could have an adverse impact on the site, and in 2019 it condemned the project.

Highways England held consultations on the scheme in 2018. A cost of £1.6 billion and a planned start date in 2021 were indicated. English Heritage, the National Trust and Historic England are quoted as supporting the concept of the tunnel with some concerns about the linking of byways, whilst the Stonehenge Alliance and Friends of the Earth remain opposed, as are the Campaign for Better Transport. In July 2019, UNESCO renewed its condemnation of the proposal and urged the government to not approve the scheme.

==== 2020 planning approval ====
Chancellor Rishi Sunak gave his support to the tunnel project at the start of 2020. Later that year, the Stonehenge Alliance asserted that the project would cause irreparable damage in breach of the World Heritage Convention, saying that the tunnel needed to be deeper and more extensive.

On 12 November 2020, the Secretary of State for Transport Grant Shapps granted a Development Consent Order for the project, overruling the recommendation of planning inspectors, and despite widespread opposition and petitions. The approved planning application comprised:

- A bypass taking the A303 north of the village of Winterbourne Stoke, with a viaduct over the Till valley
- A new junction between the A303 and the A360 Devizes–Salisbury road, west of the existing junction and outside the Stonehenge World Heritage Site
- A tunnel taking the A303 past Stonehenge, about 3.3 km (2.1 mi) long
- Expanding the junction between the A303 and A345 near Amesbury.

Campaigners launched a legal challenge. A "mass trespass" in opposition to the plans was held on 5 December 2020 by an alliance of local people and groups, climate activists, and archaeologists.

==== Legal challenges ====
In February 2021, campaigners were granted a High Court hearing to determine if a judicial review should be held, and this was upheld. UNESCO re-iterated that Stonehenge and other sites in the UK could lose their World Heritage status if the UK Government did not curb "ill-advised development". The hearing was successful, with the judge ruling the Transport Secretary's decision to proceed with the tunnel as being "unlawful" on two grounds: that there was no evidence of the impact on each individual asset at the site, and that he had failed to consider alternative schemes. By the following year, the Department for Transport and National Highways (the new name for Highways England) were still investigating whether alternative routes had been properly considered.

In May 2022, National Highways named an international consortium as its preferred bidder for construction of the tunnel and associated roads; the consortium is a joint venture of FCC Construcción (Spain), WeBuild (Italy) and BeMo Tunnelling (Austria). The following month, National Highways contracted with Mace for quantity surveying, cost consultancy and contractor liaison on the whole scheme, covering the road improvements as well as the tunnel. The next year, Secretary of State for Transport Mark Harper approved the scheme. In a 64-page letter he said he was "satisfied there is a clear need" for the new tunnel and that the project's "harm on spatial, visual relations and settings is less than substantial and should be weighed against the public benefits".

In response, campaigners launched a legal challenge in the High Court against the 2023 scheme approval. UNESCO warned again that the World Heritage Site risked being placed on the danger list if changes to the scheme were not made. Earlier, a petition with 225,000 signatures from 147 countries had been compiled by members of the Stonehenge Alliance and Save Stonehenge World Heritage Site and delivered to UNESCO's Paris headquarters. The legal challenge was dismissed in February 2024. The campaigners were granted leave to appeal, with a delay to the project while the legal process continued. A hearing commenced in the High Court on 15 July 2024.

==== Cancellation ====
Following the formation of the Starmer ministry after the 2024 general election, Chancellor Rachel Reeves announced that the government would not proceed with the Stonehenge tunnel project as part of a wider review of public spending. The decision was confirmed by the Department for Transport, which cited budgetary pressures and the need to reassess major infrastructure priorities.

In March 2026, the Department for Transport formally revoked the Development Consent Order for the A303 Amesbury to Berwick Down scheme, citing "exceptional circumstances". These included changes in the project's deliverability and the conclusion that it no longer aligned with current strategic policy objectives. The revocation also removed planning constraints affecting land in the area and allowed for alternative proposals to be considered.

By the time of cancellation, approximately £179.2 million had been spent on the project, including planning and development costs. The scheme would have included a twin-bore tunnel, two new junctions and a northern bypass of the A303 around Winterbourne Stoke.

The revocation of the DCO means that any future proposal for a tunnel or similar major road scheme in the Stonehenge landscape would require a completely new planning application process, including fresh environmental assessment and public examination.

== See also ==
- List of road projects in the UK
