= Marsh, Devon =

Hamlet in Devon, England

Coordinates: 50.89°N 3.06°W

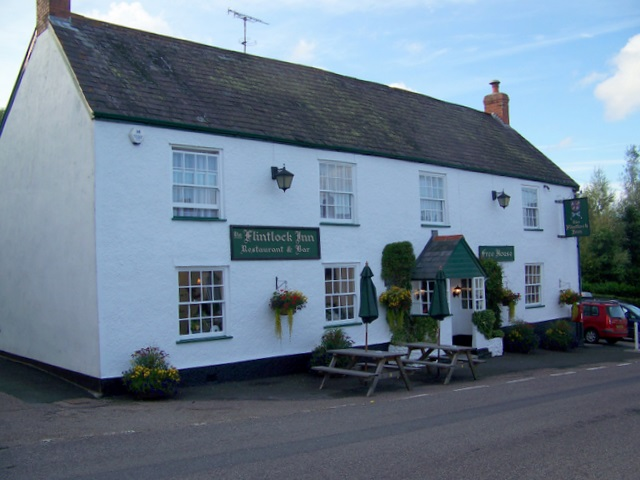
The Flintlock Inn at Marsh

Marsh is a village in the Blackdown Hills, Devon, England. It is part of the East Devon district, and close to the River Yarty and border with Somerset.

The A303, a major road through southwest England, passes through the village. A bypass, called the Marsh Diversion, opened in 1976. It is the only section of the A303 to be upgraded to dual carriageway through the Blackdown Hills. As a result, the village has also been mentioned in several strategic route plans, including the "Ilminster to Marsh improvement" and "Marsh to Honiton improvement".
