= A344 road (England) =

Former A road in Wiltshire, England

Coordinates: 51.1827°N 1.8404°W

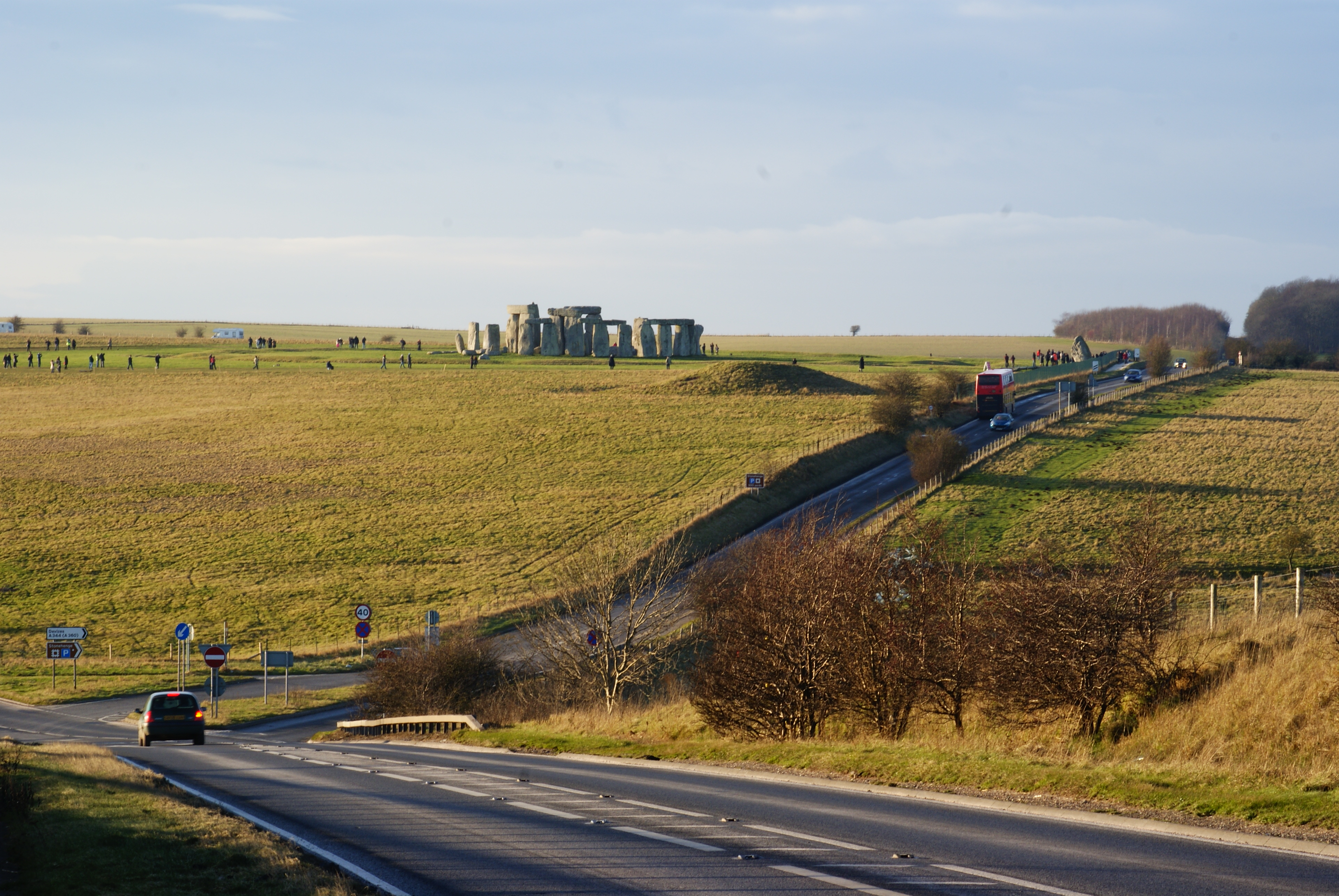
A344 passing close to Stonehenge prior to closure; A303 in foreground

The A344 was an A road in the English county of Wiltshire. Until 2013 it ran from its junction with the A303 at Stonehenge, northwest to its junction with the A360, 2 miles (3 km) away.

The A344 was once part of a longer route, from Andover (Hampshire) in the east to Warminster in the west. The section from Andover to Amesbury was redesignated as the A303 when the new route to the South West was created as an alternative to the A30. A 2-mile (3 km) section between Airman's Corner near Stonehenge and Shrewton was (sometime before 1958) shared with the re-routed A360. The western section, from Shrewton to Heytesbury near Warminster, has been re-classified as the B390.

The remaining section passed close to Stonehenge. In July 2013, work began on a £27m project which involved the closure and grassing over of the A344 between Stonehenge Bottom and the monument, with the pedestrian underpass beneath the road being filled in. This section of road was eventually closed in June 2013. The new Stonehenge visitors' centre at Airman's Corner (or Airman's Cross) opened in December 2013.

Vehicle traffic on the remaining short section of the A344 is now mostly shuttle buses between the Stonehenge visitors' centre and the monument. The bus service could not cope with demand during the fourth weekend after opening; long queues developed and many visitors chose to walk to the Stones rather than wait for the buses. Therefore, the A344 is no longer a road open to public vehicular access. As the closure of the section between Airman's Cross and Byway 12 was by means of a Traffic Regulation Order prohibiting motor vehicles, this section remains a public highway for non-motor vehicles, horses, bicycles, and pedestrians.

A memorial to Major Alexander William Hewetson, of the 66th Battery Royal Field Artillery, stands beside the old A344 at Fargo Wood, west of Stonehenge. Major Hewetson was killed in an accident on 17 July 1913 during a training flight from Larkhill Aerodrome, shortly after the formation of the Royal Flying Corps. The memorial had originally stood at the junction of the A344 and A360 but was placed in storage and re-erected in its current location when the Stonehenge visitor centre opened.

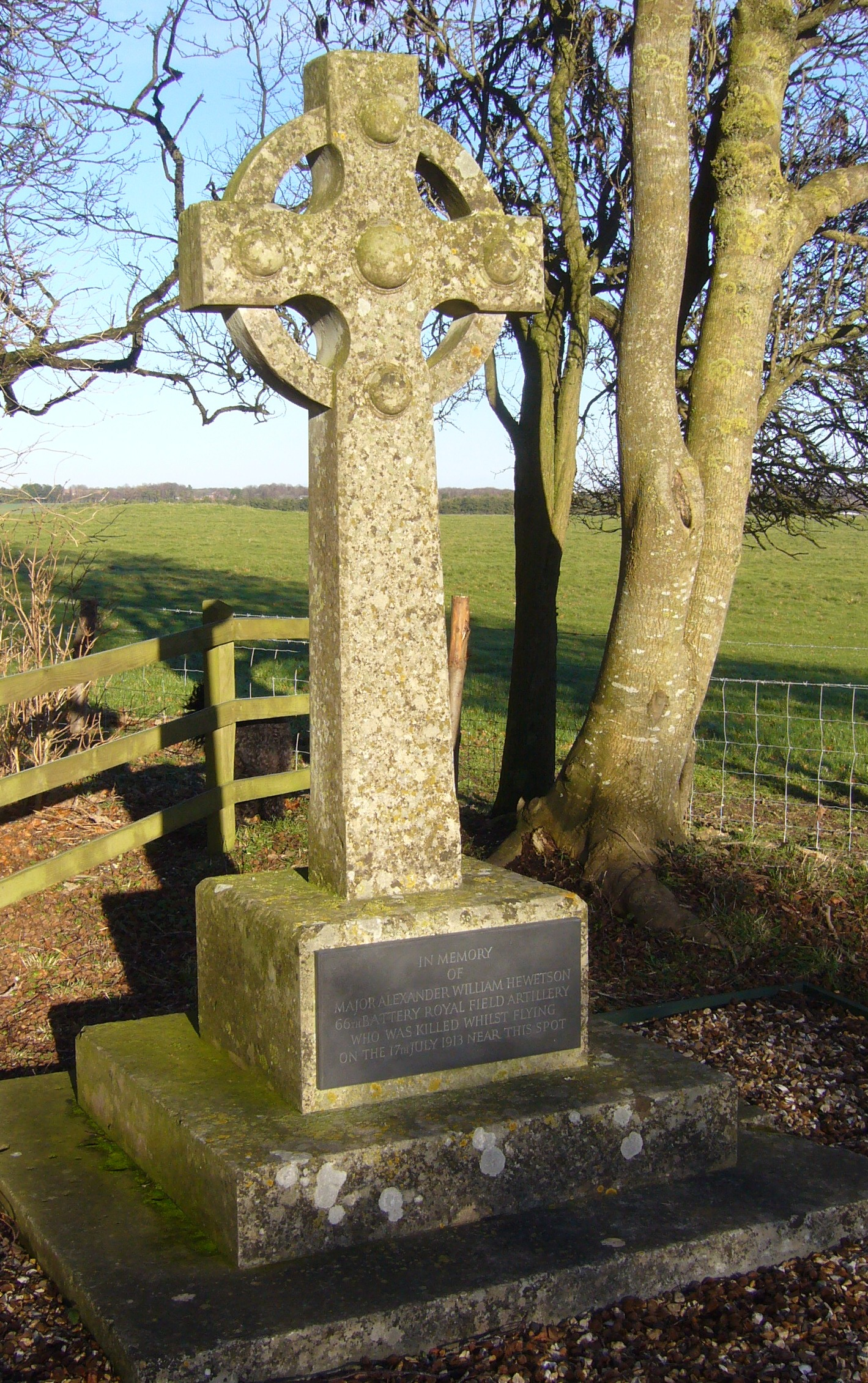
Memorial to Major Alexander William Hewetson

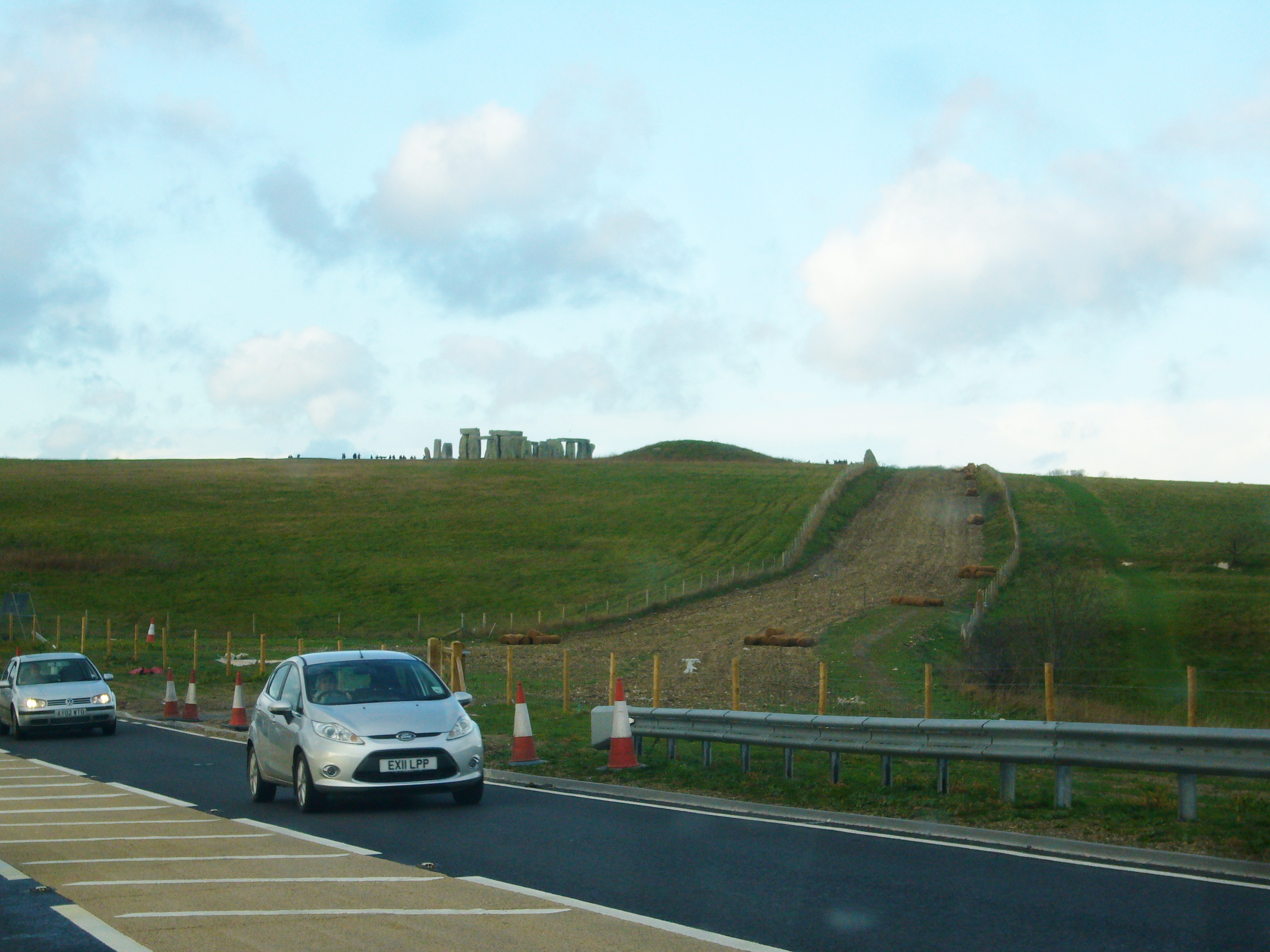
Old A344 at Stonehenge, closed in 2013 and grassed over (December 2013)

== See also ==
- Stonehenge road tunnel
