= Cursus Barrows =

Barrow cemetery in England

- Cursus round barrow cemetery
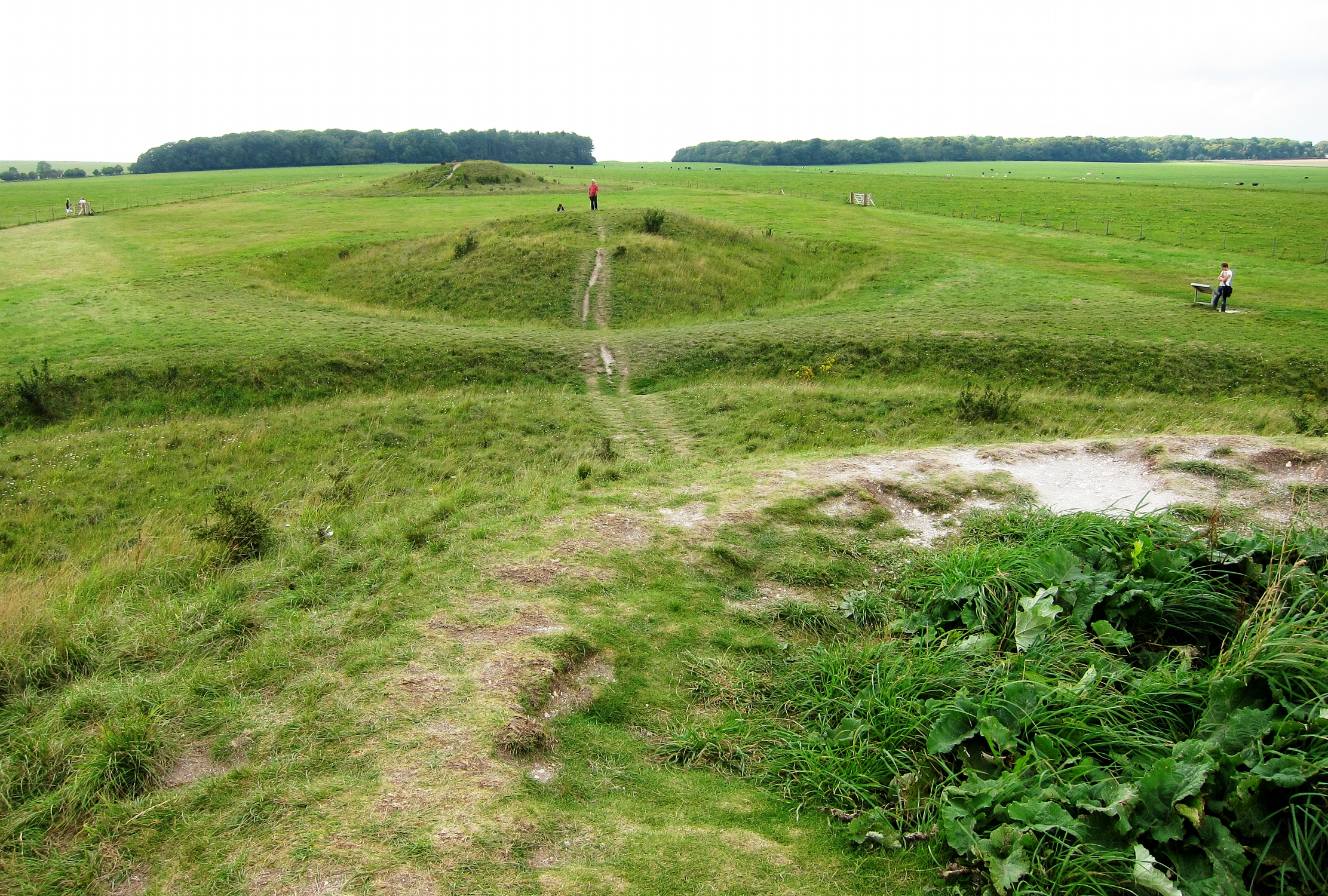
- View west from the top of Amesbury 43, looking at the Amesbury 44 and 45 barrows

- 51.183°N 1.837°W
- Type: Round barrow cemetery
- Periods: Neolithic / Bronze Age
- Location: Wiltshire
- Region: Salisbury Plain

Site notes
- Public access: Yes

UNESCO World Heritage Site
- Designated: 1986
- Reference no.: 373

The Cursus Barrows is the name given to a Neolithic and Bronze Age round barrow cemetery lying mostly south of the western end of the Stonehenge Cursus, in Wiltshire, England. The cemetery contains around 18 barrows scattered along an east-to-west ridge, although some of the mounds are no longer visible. The Cursus Barrows can be seen just north of the route between the Stonehenge Visitor Centre and Stonehenge.

== Overview ==
The round barrow cemetery extends 1200 metres east-to-west along a ridge and measures 250 metres wide. It comprises the round barrows recorded as Amesbury 43 to 56 and Winterbourne Stoke 28 to 30, plus the Fargo hengiform. Many of the barrows were excavated by Richard Colt Hoare in the early 19th century.

== Amesbury 43 and 44 ==
Amesbury 43 and 44 are a bell barrow and a twin bell barrow forming the eastern part of the Cursus round barrow cemetery.

=== Amesbury 43 ===
Amesbury 43 (grid reference SU12024278) comprises a circular central mound 3.4 metres high and 25 metres wide which sits on a plinth and is surrounded by a concentric ring ditch. The overall diameter of the monument is around 60 metres. The barrow was excavated by William Stukeley in 1723 with little result. The north and eastern parts of the barrow mound were damaged by the construction of a turnpike road in the 18th century.

=== Amesbury 44 ===
Amesbury 44 (grid reference SU11974278) comprises two barrow mounds which are completely surrounded by a single ring ditch. The eastern mound is 1.6 metres high with a diameter of 15 metres, and the western mound is 2.3 metres high with a diameter of 17 metres. The outer ditch is 5 metres wide and 1 metre deep. Both mounds were dug into by Stukeley in 1723, and the western mound was re-excavated by William Cunnington in 1803. The eastern mound yielded a cremation in an urn accompanied by bronze, amber and shale objects, and the western mound yielded a burial and a cremation in a cist.

== Amesbury 45, 46, 47 and 48 ==
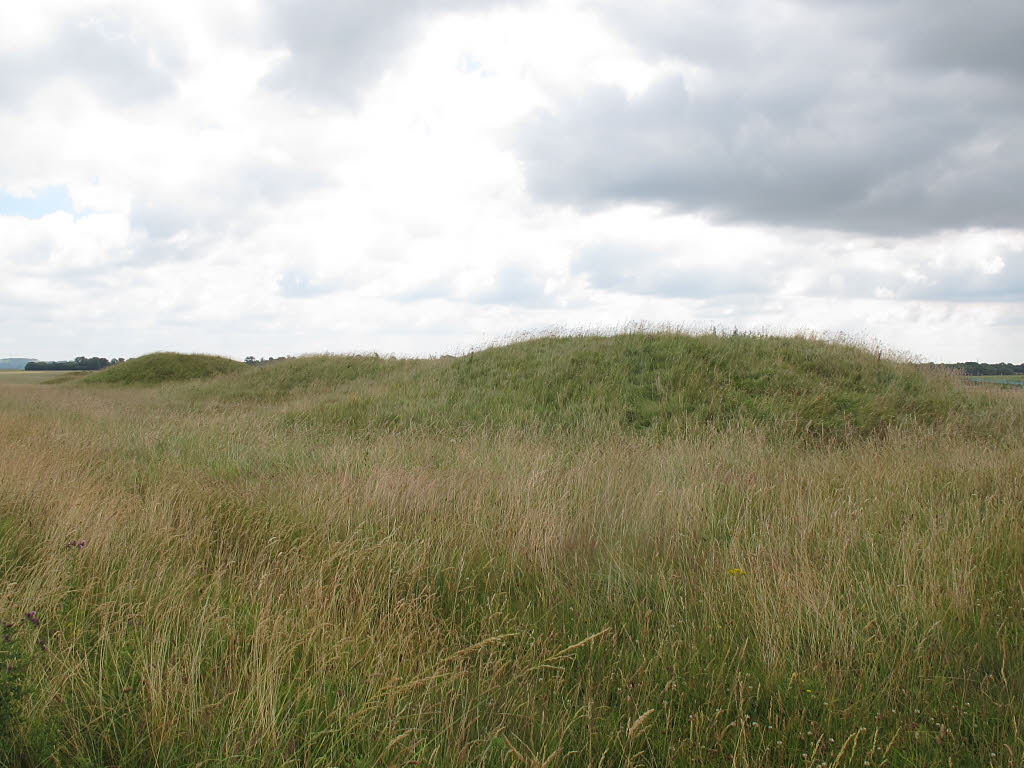
Amesbury 45 (background), and Amesbury 46 and 47 (foreground)

=== Amesbury 45 ===
Amesbury 45 (grid reference SU11864278) is a large ditched bell barrow which still stands 3.5 metres high. The monument has an overall diameter of around 56 metres with a central mound which has a diameter of 26 metres. The mound was excavated by Colt Hoare in the early 19th century, who found a cremation close to a cist of black ashes with a few pieces of burnt bone.

=== Amesbury 46 and 47 ===
Amesbury 46 and 47 (grid reference SU11804277 and SU11774277) are a pair of bell barrows with overall diameters of 38 metres and 36 metres. The central mounds are each 20 metres in diameter and just under 2 metres high. The barrows are on an east–west alignment, and the ring ditches of the two mounds join with each other. Amesbury 46 was excavated by Colt Hoare who recovered burned bones with a small spear head. His excavations of Amesbury 47 revealed a simple burial of burned bones.

=== Amesbury 48 ===
Amesbury 48 is a bowl barrow which also survives as an earthwork (grid reference SU11704279) although it is now only 0.3 metres high. It includes an outer bank which survives as a slight earthwork 4 metres wide and 0.2 metres high. Excavations by Colt Hoare uncovered a cremation with beads of stone, amber and faience.

== Amesbury 49, 50 and 51 ==
=== Amesbury 49 ===
Amesbury 49 is a round barrow (or a bowl barrow) which survives as slight earthworks (grid reference SU11524278). It has a diameter of around 26 metres. It was excavated by Colt Hoare in the early 19th century without result. The barrow was considered in good condition in 1913 but was severely damaged by ploughing in the mid-20th century. To the south-east is a flattened feature which may be another barrow (Amesbury 114; grid reference SU11544277).

=== Amesbury 50 ===
Amesbury 50 is a bowl barrow which survives as slight earthworks (grid reference SU11474267). The barrow comprises a central oval mound flanked by two asymmetric side ditches which have opposing entrances to the south-west and north-east. The barrow mound stands around 0.5-metre high and measures around 20 metres in diameter. It was excavated by Colt Hoare without result. The barrow was considered in good condition in 1913 but was damaged by ploughing in the mid-20th-century.

In 2010 the Stonehenge Hidden Landscapes project, which was engaged in mapping 14 km^{2} of the Stonehenge landscape, announced they had discovered a "henge-like" monument at this location. The discovery, found using ground-penetrating radar and magnetometers, suggested that the large circular ditch had been dug out in scoops (i.e. a causewayed ring ditch). There was also evidence for a ring of 24 one-metre wide pits around the inside edge of the ditch which may have supported a freestanding wooden structure. The two opposing entrances across the ditch, in the south-west and north-east, suggest a similar alignment as Stonehenge. The central burial mound, in this interpretation, may have been built at a later date. These discoveries were reported by the mass media in 2010 as a "second henge" at Stonehenge, and it was even stated that Stonehenge's "twin" had been found. However, other archaeologists suggested that this hengiform monument may be "just a peculiar Bronze Age barrow".

=== Amesbury 51 ===
Amesbury 51 is a reconstructed bell or bowl barrow with an overall diameter of approximately 36 metres (grid reference SU11434272). Excavations by Colt Hoare revealed a primary burial with a beaker and two secondary inhumations. It was excavated again in 1960 and finds included decayed leather, and a burial lying beneath a tapered board and accompanied by a long-necked beaker and various implements. It was interpreted as a possible mortuary house. The surrounding ditch was shown to be a causewayed ring ditch. Fragments of bluestone were found in the ditch silt. The barrow was considered in good condition in 1913 but was severely damaged by ploughing in the mid-20th century. However, following the 1960 excavations, the mound was reconstructed from the spoil to its current 1.5-metre height.

== Amesbury 52, 53, 54 and 112 ==
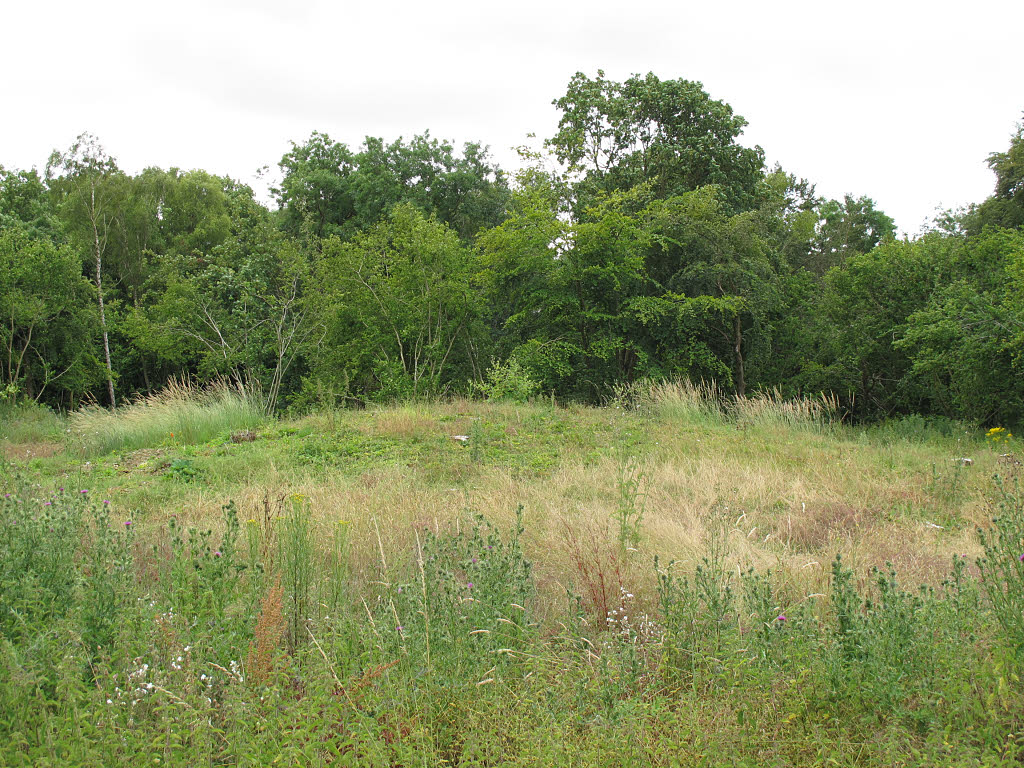
Amesbury 54 is within the Fargo plantation

Amesbury 52 is a round barrow just east of the Fargo plantation (grid reference SU11304274). It is 0.7 metres high with a diameter of 25 metres. Amesbury 53 (grid reference SU11244273) and Amesbury 54 (grid reference SU11174283) lie within the Fargo plantation. When excavated in the early 19th century Amesbury 54 revealed a primary burial with a beaker, flint spear head and polished hammer head. Amesbury 112 lies on the southern edge of Fargo Plantation (grid reference SU11134270). It is possibly a disc barrow, but the site must have been flattened by the early 19th century (since it was not recorded), and at a later date it was planted with trees.

== Fargo Hengiform ==
The Fargo Hengiform is a small hengiform enclosure located within the Fargo Plantation (grid reference SU11254280). It consists of an irregular hollow with a diameter of about 8.5 metres. Excavations in 1938 revealed a small oval ditch with an external bank broken by causeways on the north and south. At the centre of the site was a grave containing a skeleton with a beaker, food vessel, and two cremations. Another cremation was found close to the inner edge of the ditch.

== Monarch of the Plain (Amesbury 55) ==
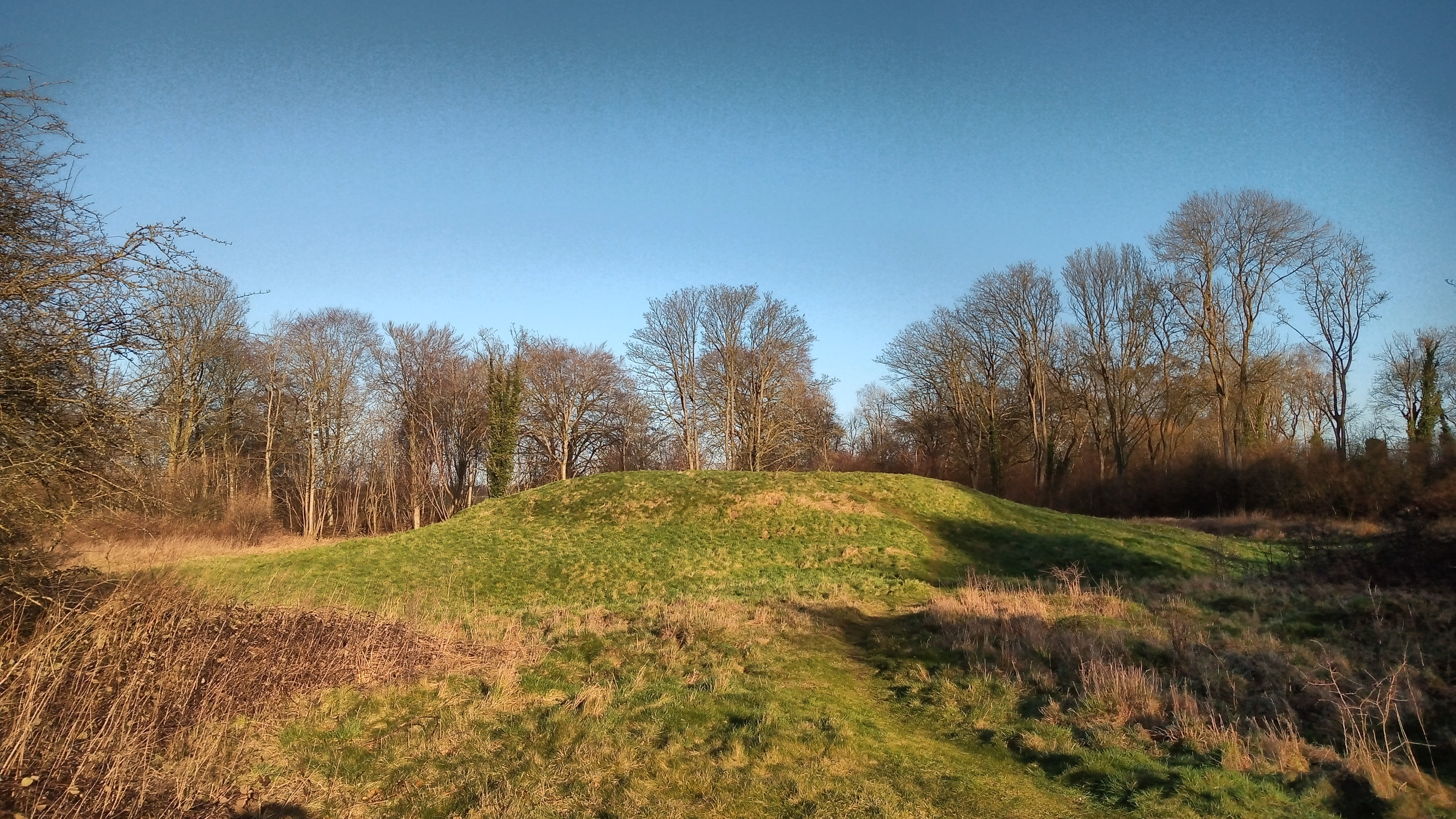
Amesbury 55. The Monarch of the Plain

The Monarch of the Plain is a very large Bronze Age bell barrow on the western edge of the Fargo plantation (grid reference SU11084276). It is 2.8 metres high with a maximum diameter of 58 metres. Excavation by Colt Hoare in the early 19th century found only charred wood.

== Amesbury 56 and Winterbourne Stoke 30 ==
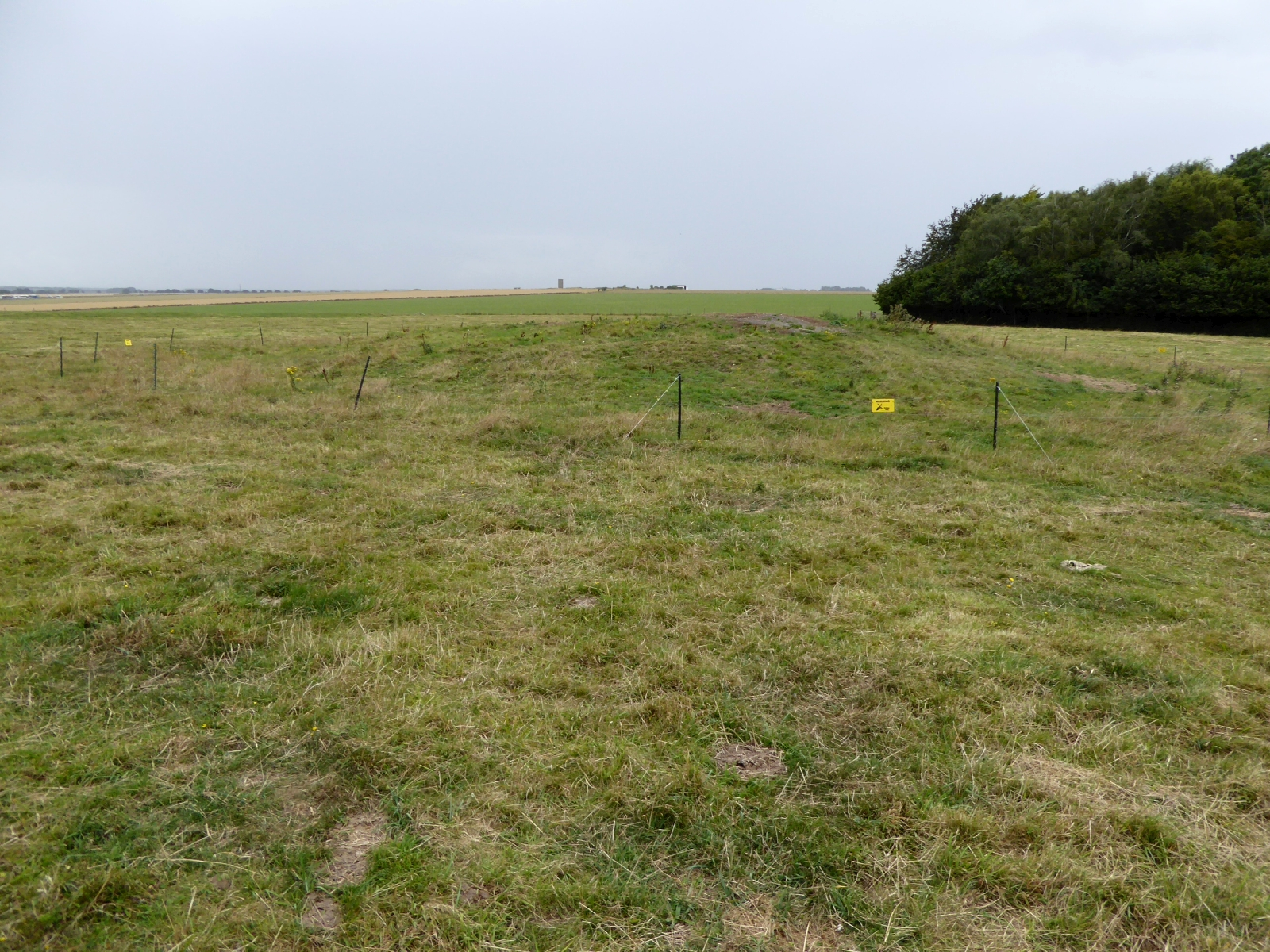
Amesbury 56 sits at the western end of the Cursus

Amesbury 56 (grid reference SU11054291) and Winterbourne Stoke 30 (grid reference SU11014292) are two barrows located within the western end of the Cursus. Amesbury 56 is a bowl barrow, or possibly a bell barrow, which is around 1.5 metres high and about 25 metres in diameter. It was excavated by Colt Hoare who found burials and grave goods, including a bronze dagger. Winterbourne Stoke 30 has been completely flattened and is no longer visible. It was excavated by Colt Hoare, who found a possible cremation. Winterbourne Stoke 30 was excavated again in 1958 demonstrating that it was a bell barrow with a central cremation pit. Burials of two children were found in the ditch of the barrow.

== Winterbourne Stoke 28 and 29 ==
Winterbourne Stoke 28 (grid reference SU10974271) and 29 (grid reference SU10884279) are a pair of largely destroyed bowl barrows to the west of the Fargo plantation. They were both excavated by Colt Hoare, who found a handled bronze awl and a collared urn in Winterbourne Stoke 28. During World War I a military base was constructed over the site destroying the two barrows. Some slight earthworks belonging to Winterbourne Stoke 28 are said to be still visible.

== See also ==
- Normanton Down Barrows
- Amesbury Archer
