= Parsonage Down =

Site of Special Scientific Interest in Wiltshire, England

Coordinates: 51.1700°N 1.9299°W

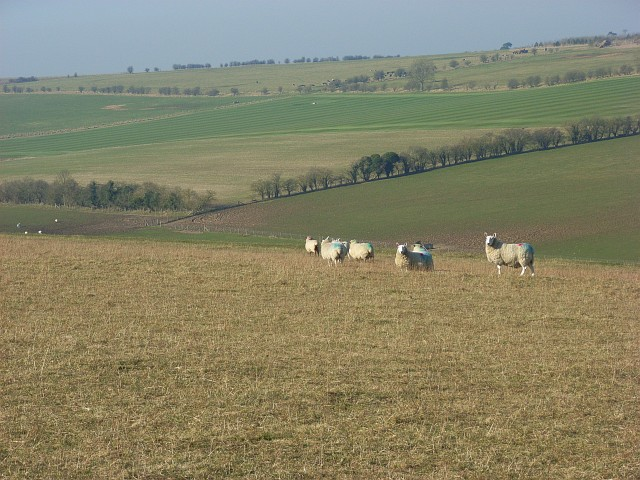
Parsonage Down

Parsonage Down (grid reference SU050412) is a 188.6 hectare biological Site of Special Scientific Interest in Wiltshire, England, notified in 1971. It lies about 7 miles (11 km) west of Amesbury, in Winterbourne Stoke parish.

== Description ==
The site is a national nature reserve in recognition of its importance as part of the Salisbury Plain landscape and calcareous grassland it supports.

Parsonage Down and Cherry Lodge Farm together form the only farm directly managed by Natural England. The farm is run for the benefit of wildlife and conservation within the SSSI and NNR, and is home to the oldest registered herd of English Longhorn cattle in the United Kingdom.

Following the introduction of the Countryside and Rights of Way Act, the whole of the site was designated "access land" and is, therefore, open to public access.

== Biological interest ==
The site has the largest population of burnt orchid (Neotinea ustulata) in northwest Europe.

== Sources ==
- Natural England citation sheet for the site (accessed 11 April 2022)
