= A360 road =

Road in England from Devizes to Salisbury

A360

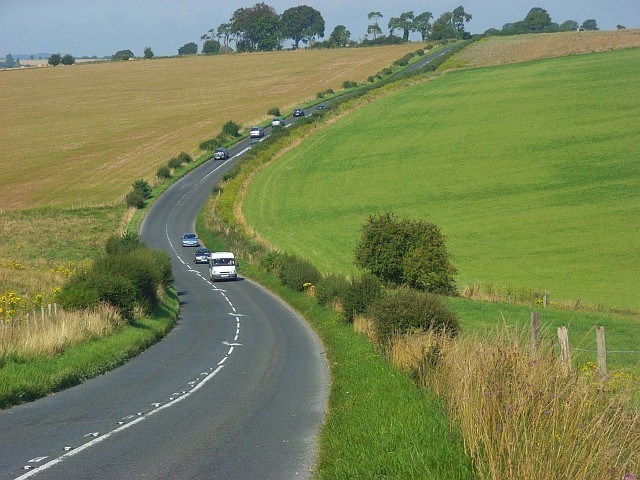
- The A360 at Rollestone

Route information
- Length: 24 mi (39 km)

Major junctions
- North West end: Devizes; 51.3537°N 1.9982°W
- A342 A303; A36
- South East end: Salisbury; 51.0724°N 1.8047°W

Location
- Country: United Kingdom
- Constituent country: England

Road network
- Roads in the United Kingdom; Motorways; A and B road zones

The A360 is an A road in Wiltshire, England, running from Devizes to Salisbury, through the villages of Potterne, West Lavington, Tilshead, and Shrewton, and passing near the Stonehenge ancient monument.

== Route ==
The road is 24 miles (39 km) long and starts at the junction of the A342 and A361 roads in the town of Devizes. It continues southwards towards Salisbury Plain, passing West Lavington via Potterne, then south-east to Shrewton via Tilshead. It turns right at Airman's Corner (a junction with an entrance to Stonehenge and the B3086), crosses the A303 and continues southwards into Salisbury, joining the A36 near the centre of the city.

== History ==
=== Original route ===
The A360 originally ran south from Shrewton, following the River Till via Winterbourne Stoke to join the A36 beyond Stapleford. This section was re-routed sometime before 1958, at first eastward for about 2 miles (3 km) along the A344 Amesbury road, then turning south near Stonehenge onto the former Devizes-Salisbury road; a straighter route on higher ground which avoids the riverside villages and heads directly for Salisbury.

=== Longbarrow Roundabout ===
In November 2012, major work began on the Longbarrow Roundabout where the A360 crosses the A303, with the intention that the A360 would become the main visitors' route to Stonehenge. In June 2013, the main road next to Stonehenge, the A344, was closed and drivers were advised to access the Stonehenge visitor centre via the A360 instead.

=== Camp Hill upgrade ===
In 2019, work began on upgrading a junction with a minor road to a roundabout at Camp Hill near the north-west outskirts of Salisbury, as it is a notorious accident blackspot with several serious incidents.

== Features ==
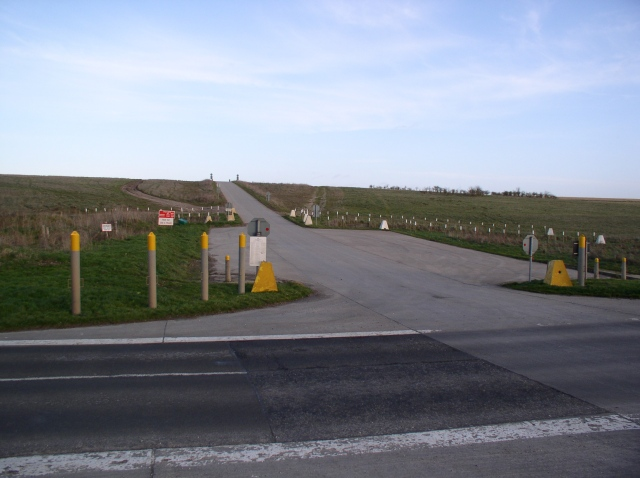
One of several tank crossings on the A360

The central section of the A360 through Salisbury Plain passes through the centre of Salisbury Plain Training Area, a major Ministry of Defence site. The road crosses several tank trails, which see sporadic active use during training exercises. A number of warning signs are placed on the road advising motorists. In 2018, live firing was stopped on the site after part of Salisbury Plain caught fire, which resulted in part of the A360 being closed.

In addition to Stonehenge, the A360 passes several ancient monuments, including Camp Down, a bowl barrow at Longbarrow.
