= Membury, Devon =

Village in Devon, England

Coordinates: 50.821942°N 3.022997°W

Membury
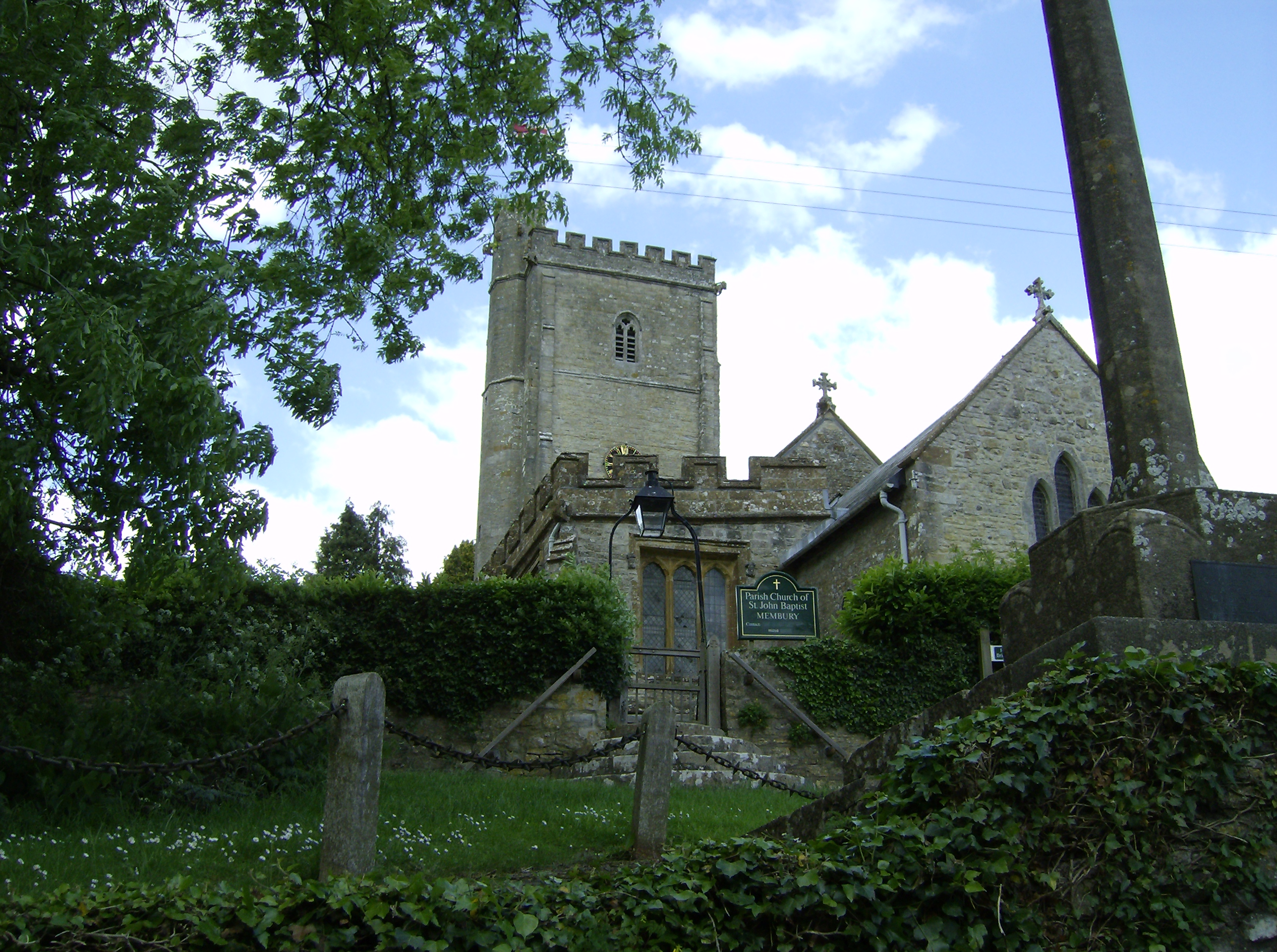
- Membury Church

- Location within Devon
- Population: 501
- OS grid reference: ST279030
- Shire county: Devon
- Region: South West
- Country: England
- Sovereign state: United Kingdom
- Post town: Axminster
- Postcode district: EX13
- Dialling code: 01404
- Police: Devon and Cornwall
- Fire: Devon and Somerset
- Ambulance: South Western
- UK Parliament: Honiton and Sidmouth

Membury is a village three miles north west of Axminster in East Devon district. The population at the 2011 Census was 501.

The village has a 13th-century church, dedicated to St John the Baptist, with a tall slim tower. In the aisle there is a monument to Sir Shilston Calmady, who was killed in a skirmish near the village in February 1646, and was buried in the chancel. The founding editor of the medical journal, The Lancet, Thomas Wakley, was born at Membury in 1795.

The village is within the Blackdown Hills Area of Outstanding Natural Beauty and lies just to the north east of Beckford Bridge over the River Yarty, which is the oldest packhorse bridge in East Devon. Near to the village there is former Quaker Meeting House that is now a hotel.

== Historic estates ==
The parish of Membury contains several historic estates including:

- Yarty, long the seat of the Fry family.

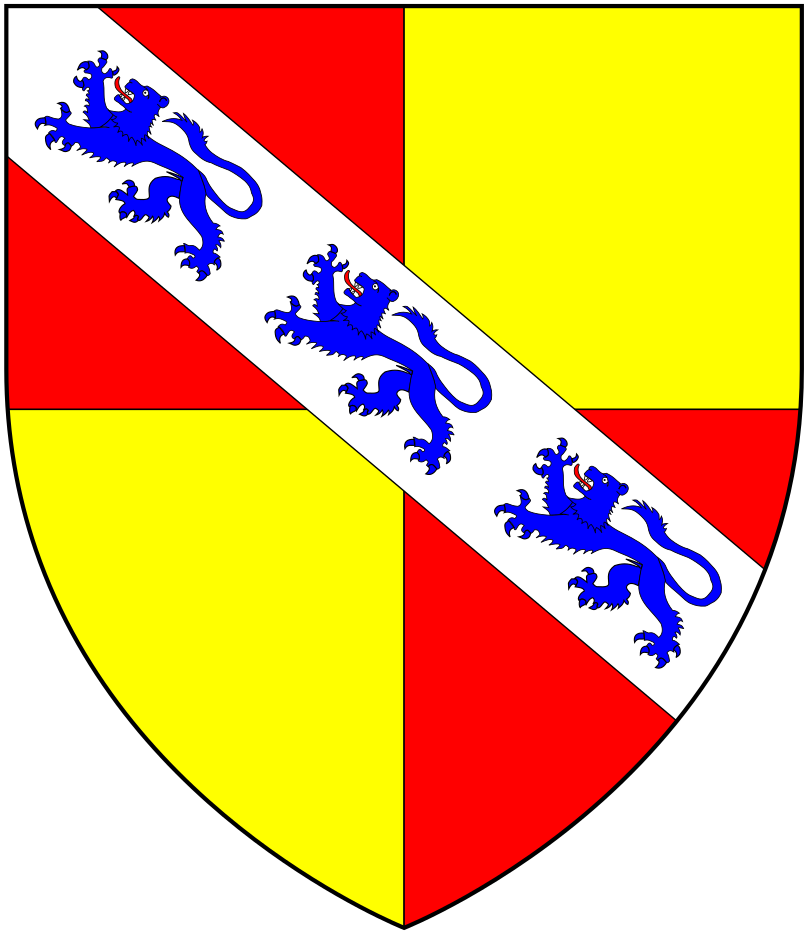
Arms of Perry of Water: Quarterly gules and or, on a bend argent three lions passant azure

- Waterhouse (anciently Waters, AtWaters, West Waters), anciently the seat of the de la Water family (gallicized to de l'eau ("from the water")), which family, as was usual, had taken their surname from their seat. It was so named (according to Pole (d.1635)) from its closeness to the River Yarty and "took the name of the water adjoyining & floatinge under it". Isabell Water, daughter and heiress of William Water, married Nicholas Hele, a younger son of Nicholas Hele of Hele, in the parish of Cornwood, Devon. His granddaughter was the heiress Emma Hele, who by her marriage (during the reign of King Henry VI (1422-1461)) to Christopher Perry brought Waters to her son William Perry who married a daughter of John Fry of adjoining Yarty. After a few generations the family became extinct in the male line on the death of William Perry, who according to Pole: "wasted all his estate except this only", which sole possession he bequeathed to his four sisters and co-heiresses. They sold it to William Fry of adjoining Yarty (or Nicholas Fry (d.1632), Sheriff of Devon in 1626, who rebuilt Yarty and whose monument survives in Membury Church), who amalgamated it with his other local estates and according to Pole: "made a very lardge & profitable & commodious demesnes, replenished with pastures, meadows, arable land, woode & water & all com(m)odities belonginge unto hospitality". The arms of Perry of Waters were: Quarterly gules and or, on a bend argent three lions passant azure.
