= Winterbourne Stoke =

Village in Wiltshire, England

Coordinates: 51.169°N 1.892°W

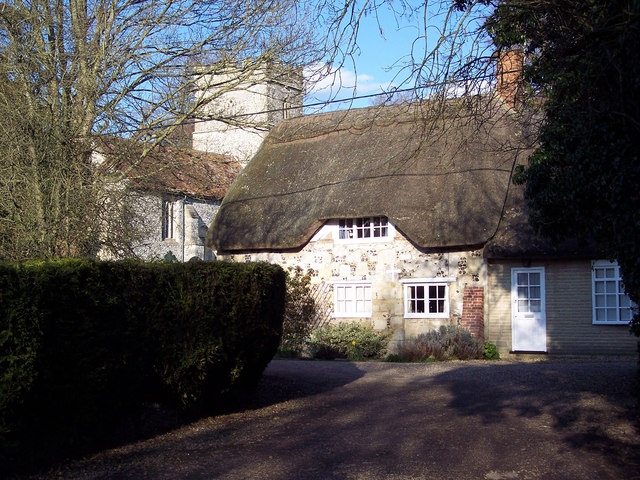
- Cottages with church behind

- Location within Wiltshire
- Population: 220 (in 2021)
- OS grid reference: SU077411
- Civil parish: Winterbourne Stoke
- Unitary authority: Wiltshire
- Ceremonial county: Wiltshire
- Region: South West
- Country: England
- Sovereign state: United Kingdom
- Post town: Salisbury
- Postcode district: SP3
- Dialling code: 01980
- Police: Wiltshire
- Fire: Dorset and Wiltshire
- Ambulance: South Western
- UK Parliament: East Wiltshire
- Website: Parish Council

Winterbourne Stoke is a village and civil parish in Wiltshire, England, about 5 miles (8 km) west of Amesbury and 3 miles (4.8 km) west of the prehistoric monument of Stonehenge.

The village is on the River Till at the southern edge of Salisbury Plain, on both sides of a single-carriageway stretch of the busy A303 trunk road.

== History ==
Especially in its east part, the parish is rich in archaeological remains, beginning in the Neolithic period. The easternmost part of the parish (beyond the A360/B3086) is within the Stonehenge section of the Stonehenge and Avebury World Heritage site. This area includes the Lesser Cursus earthwork and adjacent barrows, and the western tip of the Greater Cursus (which predates Stonehenge) and the nearby Cursus Barrows. North of the village, on the slopes of the Till valley, are two cemetery sites with round barrows and later earthworks.

A Romano-British settlement, medieval earthworks and a field system have been identified on Winterbourne Stoke Down, northeast of the village; in her 1930 survey of Romano-British Wiltshire, Maud Cunnington noted this settlement to be well preserved.

The Domesday survey in 1086 recorded a settlement at Wintreburne with 50 households, a church and a mill, on the king's land; Edward of Salisbury held two small estates. The Wiltshire Victoria County History traces later owners of Winterbourne Stoke manor, including John Maltravers, 1st Baron Maltravers (d.1364) and the earls of Arundel in the 15th and 16th centuries.

The church was linked to Jumièges Abbey, Normandy, from the mid-13th century, then became an endowment of Sheen Priory, Surrey, on its foundation in 1414.

The manor house, in its own grounds south of the main road, dates from the 17th century and is Grade II* listed. A large house built in flint and limestone chequerwork, it has a five-bay main part with cross wings at both ends and was extended around 1920. The road from Amesbury to Mere, now the A303, was turnpiked in 1761.

A schoolroom was built in 1818, and by 1871 the school was affiliated to the National Society and had up to 50 pupils. In 1875 the school moved to a new building on Church Street, but by 1935 attendance had fallen to 17, and it was closed in 1949; children aged 11 and over went instead to the secondary school at Wilton which had opened in 1935.

From 1941 to 1945, the RAF had a grass airfield at Oatlands Hill in the east of the parish. It was a satellite site of Old Sarum and was used mainly for training.

== Geography ==
The parish of Winterbourne Stoke mostly consists of downland, with chalk outcrops in places. It is bisected from north to south by the River Till, which rises to the north on Salisbury Plain, and which was originally called the River Winterbourne. The village is located at the junction of the B3083 road, running north and south, and the A303 trunk road, running east and west. The land is gently sloping; level areas near the river have been used as meadowland and slightly sloping land for arable cropping since the Middle Ages.

Most of the Parsonage Down national nature reserve is within the parish. This ancient downland is rich in wild flowers as well as having scrubby areas where yellowhammers and turtle doves flourish.

== Parish church ==
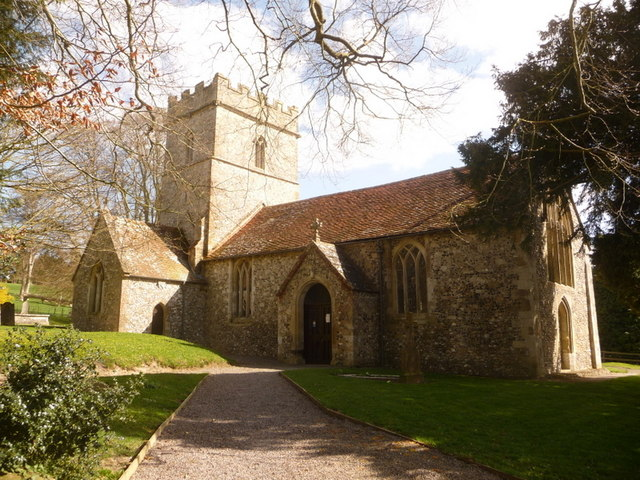
St Peter's Church

The Church of England parish church of St Peter is at the south end of the village. The earliest parts of the building are the 12th-century north doorway and blocked south doorway of the nave; the nave (which has no aisles) is from later in that century. The crossing, transepts and chancel were added in the 13th century and at that time the central tower was probably square, although the present tower is from the 14th or 15th century and rectangular. The nave and tower are built in flint with some ashlar dressings. Two windows were added to the nave in the 15th century, and its west end was rebuilt with a large window in the 16th. At some point before 1800 the north transept was removed.

Extensive restoration in 1838–40 saw the chancel rebuilt in yellow brick on the same foundations, the nave re-roofed, and the north porch added. In 1881 a vestry was built on the site of the north transept, and a lean-to recess for the organ was added to the chancel. The church was designated as Grade II* listed in 1988.

Two of the four bells were cast at Salisbury around 1400; the peal is said to be unringable. The font is on a 12th-century base although the bowl may be later. The octagonal pulpit (brought from St Giles in the deserted village of Imber) and some of the pews are from the 17th century. Monuments in the churchyard include a row of five 18th-century limestone chest tombs of members of the Goodenough family.

A new vicarage was built c. 1850 and sold in 1938, from which time the role of vicar was held by the incumbent of the united benefice of Shrewton, Maddington and Rollestone. Today the parish is part of the Wylye and Till Valley benefice, alongside eight others.

== Amenities ==
The Bell Inn, built as a house in the mid 19th century on the north side of the main road, was in use as a pub by 1855.

The manor estate is a venue for weddings and corporate events.

== Road ==
The A303 which passes through the village is a primary route linking London and central southern England with the southwest. Plans to reroute the road north of the village, as part of the Stonehenge tunnel project, received Development Consent Order approval in 2020.
