= Yarcombe =

Village in Devon, England

Coordinates: 50.8686°N 3.0741°W

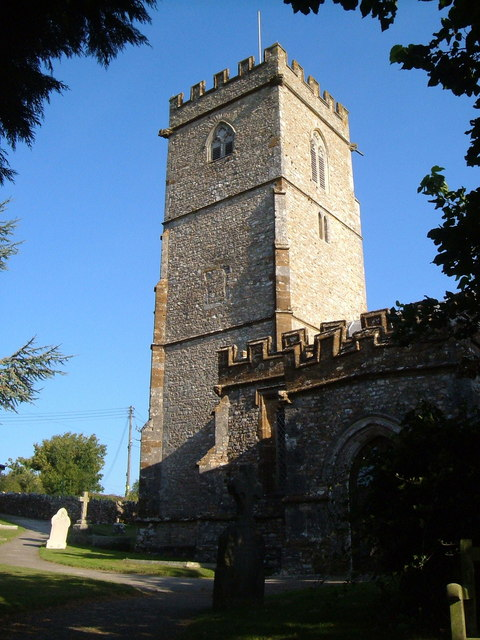
- St John the Baptist church, Yarcombe

- Location within Devon
- Population: 500 (2011 census)
- Civil parish: Yarcombe
- District: East Devon
- Shire county: Devon
- Region: South West
- Country: England
- Sovereign state: United Kingdom
- Post town: Honiton
- Postcode district: EX14
- Police: Devon and Cornwall
- Fire: Devon and Somerset
- Ambulance: South Western
- UK Parliament: Honiton and Sidmouth

Yarcombe is a village and civil parish in the East Devon district, in the county of Devon, England, situated on the A30 road near the towns of Honiton and Chard. It is sited in the steep rolling meadows and ancient woods of the Yarty Valley on the south edge of the Blackdown Hills, an Area of Outstanding Natural Beauty. The population according to the 2011 census was 500.

The small village centre has a Norman church, dedicated to St John the Baptist, an old inn with monastical roots, a hotel, a bed and breakfast and a cluster of houses, but there are also many outlying farms and hamlets which make Yarcombe a large parish.

Yarcombe is a working village, and farming and agricultural support services are important sources of employment. There are other small businesses in the community, such as accommodation and catering, building and joinery, motor services, furniture making, and rural crafts. The village has a village hall and an active community life, including traditions such as pig and terrier racing, barrel rolling and metal ball throwing. The East Devon Sheepdog Trials have been held in Yarcombe for several years, in July.

Earl (later King) Harold briefly owned the manor in the village, prior to his demise at the Battle of Hastings. In Elizabethan times ownership of the manor passed to Francis Drake. Today one of his descendants remains squire of Yarcombe. In the Hundred Years War money was sent from Yarcombe by its French owner to the armies of France, to help them fight the English.

Yarcombe village is located close to the Devon/Somerset border and not far from West Dorset. The nearest small towns are Chard (6 miles) and Honiton (8 miles). Nearby are the coastal resorts of Lyme Regis, Seaton, Sidmouth, Budleigh Salterton and Exmouth. Larger towns further afield include Taunton (12 miles to the north), Exeter and Yeovil (around 25 miles west and east respectively).

Yarcombe won the Devon Village of the Year competition in 2005 and then at the West of England finals finished top of the Business of the Year category for the region.
