= River Yarty =

River in east Devon, England

Coordinates: 50°46′13″N 3°01′06″W

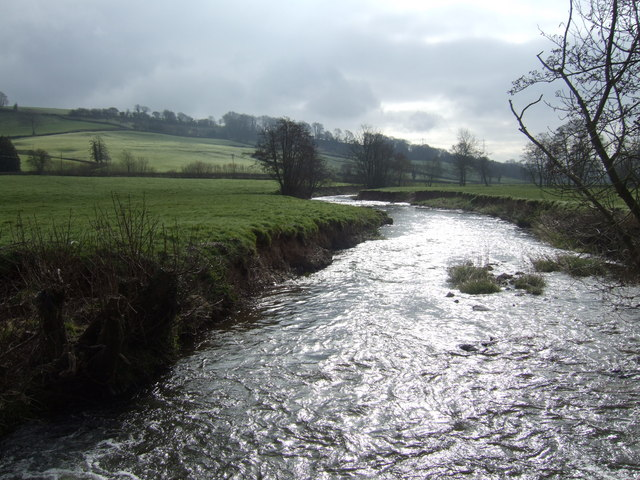
The River Yarty running in the valley between Dalwood and Membury

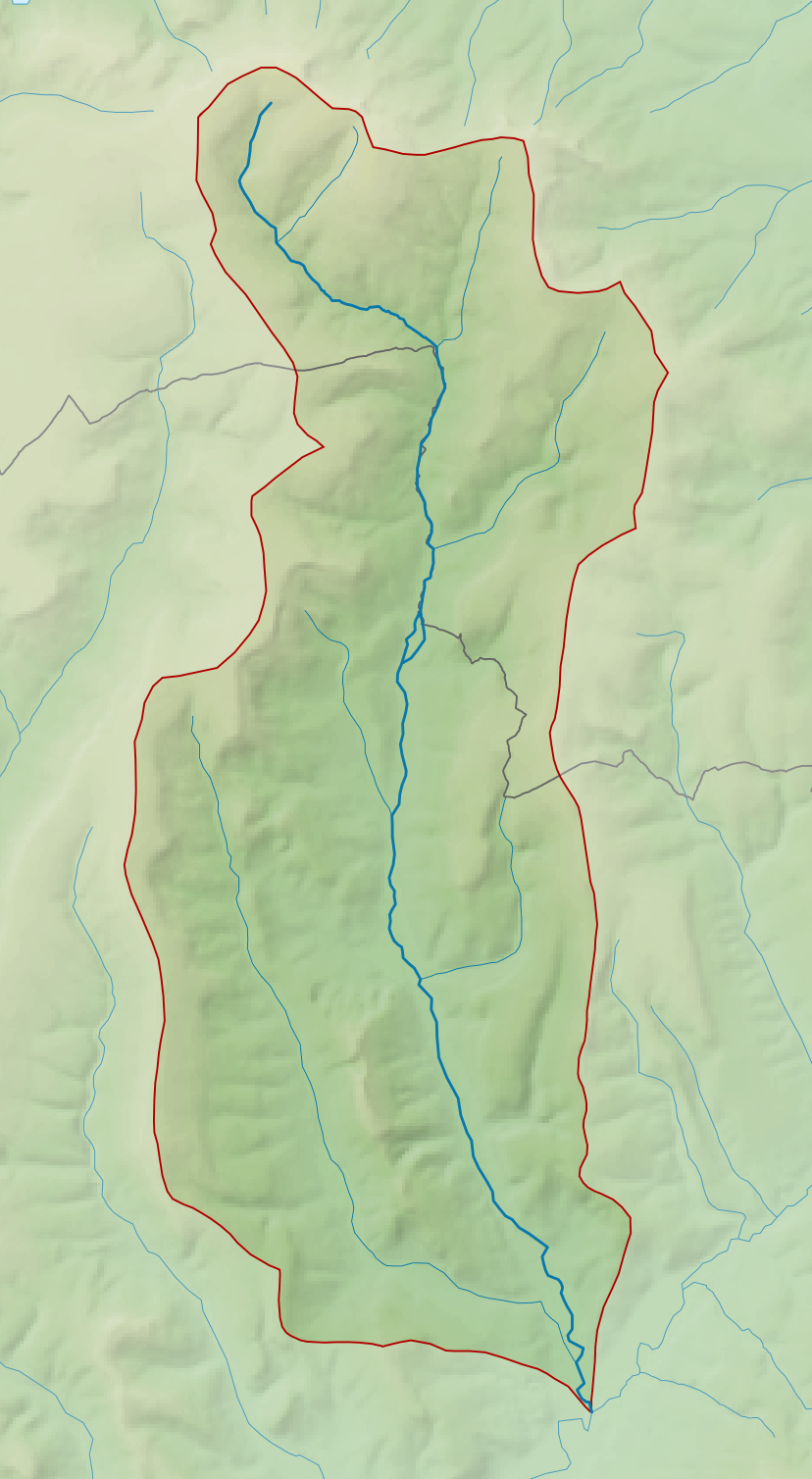
Map showing the course and catchment of the Yarty

The River Yarty is a river in east Devon, England, near the boundary with Somerset and Dorset.

== Course ==
The river is about 26 kilometres (16 mi) long. The source is in Staple Hill in the Blackdown Hills. It flows on a roughly southern course through Bishopswood, briefly forming the boundary between Devon and Somerset, then between Devon and Dorset following a tripoint of all three counties, through Marsh. It continues to form a river valley for much of the rest of its course, passing between Yarcombe, Stockland, Dalwood and Membury until it meets the River Axe just southwest of Axminster, which continues to the English Channel.

The A303, a major road across southern England, runs across the Yarty on a high viaduct at Marsh. Further south, the A30 crosses the river east of Yarcombe, slightly west of the Devon – Dorset border at the Crawley Bridge.

== History ==
The name is of an uncertain origin but is believed to be derived from Old English. The villages of Yarcombe and Yartyford are both named after the river.

The upper area forms one of several bisections of the otherwise hilly area around the Blackdown Hills. As the river is based in a relatively deep valley, it is prone to flooding. There have been numerous formally recorded reports of property damage near the Yarty since the 1960s. The land across the flood plain of the Yarty is boggy and difficult to cross. In the late spring of 1685 during the Monmouth Rebellion, this caused problems when Lord Albermarle's army were unable to defend the advancing Duke of Monmouth northwards from Lyme Regis towards Sedgemoor.
