= Listed buildings in Grittleton =

Buildings in Corsham, Wiltshire, England

Grittleton is a village and civil parish in Wiltshire, England. It contains 72 listed buildings that are recorded in the National Heritage List for England. Of these six are grade II* and 66 are grade II.

This list is based on the information retrieved online from Historic England.

== Key ==
Grade	Criteria
I	Buildings that are of exceptional interest
II*	Particularly important buildings of more than special interest
II	Buildings that are of special interest

== Listing ==
Name	Grade	Location	Type	Completed (Note: The date given is the date used by Historic England as significant for the initial building or that of an important part in the structure's description.)	Date designated	Grid ref. (Note: The grid reference is based on the British national grid reference system, sometimes known as OSGB36, used by the Ordnance Survey.) Geo-coordinates	Notes	Entry number (Note: The "List Entry Number" is a unique number assigned to each listed building and scheduled monument by Historic England.)	Image	Wikidata
Barn at West Dunley Farm	II	Alderton Road			29 February 1988	ST8472781257; 51°31′48″N 2°13′18″W		1022284	Upload Photo	Q26272441
East Dunley Farmhouse	II	Alderton Road			29 February 1988	ST8584981628; 51°32′00″N 2°12′19″W		1022283	Upload Photo	Q26272440
Fosse Lodge	II	Alderton Road			29 February 1988	ST8571582047; 51°32′14″N 2°12′26″W		1198366	Upload Photo	Q26494379
West Dunley Farmhouse	II	Alderton Road			29 February 1988	ST8468881215; 51°31′47″N 2°13′20″W		1198377	Upload Photo	Q26494310
Crowdown	II	East Foscote			29 February 1988	ST8749279804; 51°31′01″N 2°10′54″W		1363878	Upload Photo	Q26645686
Foscote House	II	Foscote			20 December 1960	ST8621879424; 51°30′49″N 2°12′00″W		1022285	Upload Photo	Q26272442
Woodman's Lodge	II	Foscote			29 February 1988	ST8652679593; 51°30′54″N 2°11′44″W		1363879	Upload Photo	Q26645687
Roberts Berry Farmhouse	II	Hullavington Road			29 February 1988	ST8756280939; 51°31′38″N 2°10′50″W		1022286	Upload Photo	Q26272443
Church of St Margaret	II*	Leigh Delamere			20 December 1960	ST8845379276; 51°30′44″N 2°10′04″W		1022289	Upload Photo	Q7594137
Leigh Delamere House	II	Leigh Delamere			29 February 1988	ST8855379259; 51°30′44″N 2°09′59″W		1022292	Upload Photo	Q26273131
Lychgate to South of Church of St Margaret, With Enclosing Wall	II	Leigh Delamere			29 February 1988	ST8845379240; 51°30′43″N 2°10′04″W		1198449	Upload Photo	Q26494480
Manor Farmhouse	II	Leigh Delamere			29 February 1988	ST8835779312; 51°30′45″N 2°10′09″W		1022287	Upload Photo	Q26272444
Two Unidentified Monuments South of Chancel of Church of St Margaret	II	Leigh Delamere			29 February 1988	ST8846279244; 51°30′43″N 2°10′04″W		1022290	Upload Photo	Q26273129
The Almhouses	II	1-8, Leigh Delamere			29 February 1988	ST8848479281; 51°30′44″N 2°10′02″W		1022291	Upload Photo	Q26273130
Barton Cottage	II	Littleton Drew			29 February 1988	ST8325180046; 51°31′09″N 2°14′34″W		1022293	Upload Photo	Q26273132
Church of All Saints	II*	Littleton Drew			29 February 1988	ST8313980189; 51°31′13″N 2°14′40″W		1022294	Upload Photo	Q17534223
Churchyard Cross in Churchyard North of Church of All Saints	II	Littleton Drew			29 February 1988	ST8314080202; 51°31′14″N 2°14′40″W		1198492	Upload Photo	Q17642905
Congregational Church	II	Littleton Drew			29 February 1988	ST8323680100; 51°31′10″N 2°14′35″W		1198483	Upload Photo	Q26494513
Dovecote to South of Manor Farmhouse	II	Littleton Drew			29 February 1988	ST8303280356; 51°31′19″N 2°14′45″W		1022295	Upload Photo	Q26273133
Group of Six Monuments to East of Church of All Saints	II	Littleton Drew			29 February 1988	ST8314980181; 51°31′13″N 2°14′39″W		1363881	Upload Photo	Q26645689
Manor Farmhouse and Barn to West	II	Littleton Drew			29 February 1988	ST8304880419; 51°31′21″N 2°14′45″W		1198505	Upload Photo	Q26494534
The Plough Inn	II	Littleton Drew			29 February 1988	ST8309180330; 51°31′18″N 2°14′42″W		1198473	Upload Photo	Q26494503
The Village Hall	II	Littleton Drew			29 February 1988	ST8320480198; 51°31′14″N 2°14′36″W		1363880	Upload Photo	Q26645688
Townsend Farmhouse	II	Littleton Drew			29 February 1988	ST8327980084; 51°31′10″N 2°14′33″W		1198463	Upload Photo	Q26494493
Catkins Shamrock Cottage	II	2, School Lane			29 February 1988	ST8613980230; 51°31′15″N 2°12′04″W		1283802	Catkins Shamrock Cottage More images	Q26572623
Webb's Cottage	II	3, School Lane			29 February 1988	ST8615880226; 51°31′15″N 2°12′03″W		1363882	Webb's Cottage More images	Q26645690
Pair of Cottages on East Side Occupied by E Stone and a Gough	II	4 and 5, School Lane			29 February 1988	ST8616880214; 51°31′14″N 2°12′03″W		1198517	Pair of Cottages on East Side Occupied by E Stone and a Gough More images	Q26494546
Barn at Sevington Farm	II	Sevington			16 June 1981	ST8691078680; 51°30′25″N 2°11′24″W		1198544	Upload Photo	Q26494571
Former School and School House	II*	Sevington			29 February 1988	ST8711678814; 51°30′29″N 2°11′13″W		1022297	Upload Photo	Q17534237
Green Cottage	II	Sevington			29 February 1988	ST8706778788; 51°30′28″N 2°11′16″W		1198559	Upload Photo	Q26494585
Holly Tree Cottage The Cottage	II	Sevington			29 February 1988	ST8703478770; 51°30′28″N 2°11′18″W		1363845	Upload Photo	Q26645657
Moss Delph Wavertree Cottage	II	Sevington			29 February 1988	ST8713778801; 51°30′29″N 2°11′12″W		1198571	Upload Photo	Q26494597
Rose Cottage The Cottage	II	Sevington			29 February 1988	ST8700578741; 51°30′27″N 2°11′19″W		1363883	Upload Photo	Q26645691
Sevington Farmhouse	II	Sevington			29 February 1988	ST8695778693; 51°30′25″N 2°11′22″W		1022296	Upload Photo	Q26273134
Sevington House	II	Sevington			29 February 1988	ST8700778699; 51°30′25″N 2°11′19″W		1198577	Upload Photo	Q26494603
The Horseshoes	II	1 and 2, Sevington			20 December 1960	ST8689878624; 51°30′23″N 2°11′25″W		1363846	Upload Photo	Q26645658
The Salutation Inn	II	The Gib, Castle Combe			9 December 1985	ST8380479097; 51°30′38″N 2°14′05″W		1199018	The Salutation Inn More images	Q26494937
Bennett Monument in Churchyard about 2 Metres North of East End of North Aisle of Church of St Mary	II	The Street			29 February 1988	ST8601880029; 51°31′08″N 2°12′10″W		1022300	Bennett Monument in Churchyard about 2 Metres North of East End of North Aisle of Church of St Mary More images	Q26273235
Church House	II	The Street			20 December 1960	ST8601680077; 51°31′10″N 2°12′11″W		1363848	Church House More images	Q26645660
Church of St Mary	II*	The Street			20 December 1960	ST8601180019; 51°31′08″N 2°12′11″W		1198617	Church of St Mary More images	Q17543628
Dovecote to Rear of Glebe House	II	The Street			20 December 1960	ST8594780097; 51°31′11″N 2°12′14″W		1022299	Upload Photo	Q26273137
Entrance Gates and Piers to Church House	II	The Street			29 February 1988	ST8605880032; 51°31′09″N 2°12′08″W		1022301	Entrance Gates and Piers to Church House More images	Q26273236
Fairlawn Merestead	II	The Street			30 September 1993	ST8618680187; 51°31′14″N 2°12′02″W		1253945	Fairlawn Merestead More images	Q26545652
Fosse Cottage	II	The Street			29 February 1988	ST8611580129; 51°31′12″N 2°12′05″W		1198643	Fosse Cottage More images	Q26494614
Grittleton Baptist Chapel	II*	The Street			29 May 1985	ST8618080057; 51°31′09″N 2°12′02″W		1363850	Upload Photo	Q5609723
K6 Telephone Kiosk Outside The Old Baptist Chapel	II	The Street			27 January 1989	ST8614580129; 51°31′12″N 2°12′04″W		1363789	K6 Telephone Kiosk Outside The Old Baptist Chapel More images	Q26645603
Malmesbury Lodge	II	The Street			29 February 1988	ST8626780238; 51°31′15″N 2°11′58″W		1022303	Upload Photo	Q26273238
Manor Farmhouse	II	The Street			29 February 1988	ST8588380062; 51°31′09″N 2°12′17″W		1022298	Manor Farmhouse More images	Q26273136
Masons	II	The Street			29 February 1988	ST8589980017; 51°31′08″N 2°12′17″W		1198608	Masons More images	Q26494404
Milestone in Wall about 8 Metres East of Entrance to Masons	II	The Street			29 February 1988	ST8591980003; 51°31′08″N 2°12′16″W		1363847	Milestone in Wall about 8 Metres East of Entrance to Masons More images	Q26645659
Penny Cottage	II	The Street			29 February 1988	ST8614580158; 51°31′13″N 2°12′04″W		1198654	Penny Cottage More images	Q26494625
Rose Cottage and Cottage Adjoining	II	The Street			29 February 1988	ST8612480143; 51°31′12″N 2°12′05″W		1022302	Rose Cottage and Cottage Adjoining More images	Q26273237
South View Windmill Cottage	II	The Street			30 September 1993	ST8616980176; 51°31′13″N 2°12′03″W		1203734	South View Windmill Cottage More images	Q26499248
The Barton	II	The Street			20 December 1960	ST8611980085; 51°31′10″N 2°12′05″W		1022304	The Barton More images	Q26273239
The Forge	II	The Street			29 February 1988	ST8610580119; 51°31′11″N 2°12′06″W		1363849	The Forge More images	Q26645661
The Neeld Arms	II	The Street			29 February 1988	ST8607680083; 51°31′10″N 2°12′07″W		1198639	The Neeld Arms More images	Q26494432
The Old Stores	II	The Street			29 February 1988	ST8594079990; 51°31′07″N 2°12′14″W		1363851	The Old Stores More images	Q26645662
Unidentified Monument in the Churchyard about 8 Metres East North East of Vestry of Church of St Mary	II	The Street			29 February 1988	ST8602780034; 51°31′09″N 2°12′10″W		1198634	Unidentified Monument in the Churchyard about 8 Metres East North East of Vestry of Church of St Mary More images	Q26494427
Weighbridge House	II	The Street			29 February 1988	ST8594480017; 51°31′08″N 2°12′14″W		1198611	Weighbridge House More images	Q26494407
Woodlands	II	The Street			29 February 1988	ST8616180131; 51°31′12″N 2°12′03″W		1198658	Woodlands More images	Q26494629
Barn at Manor Farm, to South of Road	II	Leigh Delamere			29 February 1988	ST8843079235; 51°30′43″N 2°10′05″W		1022288	Upload Photo	Q26273127
Barn at West Foscote Farm and Range of Stalls Attached	II	West Foscote			29 February 1988	ST8527778891; 51°30′32″N 2°12′49″W		1022306	Upload Photo	Q26273241
West Foscote House	II	West Foscote			29 February 1988	ST8533278911; 51°30′32″N 2°12′46″W		1022305	Upload Photo	Q26273240
Barn at West Sevington Farm	II	West Sevington			29 February 1988	ST8608278205; 51°30′09″N 2°12′07″W		1022308	Upload Photo	Q26273244
West Sevington Farmhouse	II	West Sevington			29 February 1988	ST8613678214; 51°30′10″N 2°12′04″W		1022307	Upload Photo	Q26273243
Emu Paddock	II	Yatton Keynell Road			29 February 1988	ST8604879591; 51°30′54″N 2°12′09″W		1198786	Upload Photo	Q26494749
Grittleton House	II*	Yatton Keynell Road			29 February 1988	ST8609179998; 51°31′07″N 2°12′07″W		1022310	Grittleton House More images	Q5609722
Grittleton Stables	II	Yatton Keynell Road			29 February 1988	ST8611779655; 51°30′56″N 2°12′05″W		1022312	Upload Photo	Q26273247
Ryleys Farmhouse	II	Yatton Keynell Road			29 February 1988	ST8641179286; 51°30′44″N 2°11′50″W		1022313	Upload Photo	Q26273248
Stable Lodge	II	Yatton Keynell Road			29 February 1988	ST8596679631; 51°30′56″N 2°12′13″W		1022311	Upload Photo	Q26273246
Statue in the Grounds to East of Grittleton House	II	Yatton Keynell Road			30 September 1993	ST8629879982; 51°31′07″N 2°11′56″W		1203733	Upload Photo	Q26499247
West Lodge and Entrance Gates to Grittleton House	II	Yatton Keynell Road			29 February 1988	ST8586179975; 51°31′07″N 2°12′19″W		1022309	West Lodge and Entrance Gates to Grittleton House More images	Q26273245

== See also ==
- Grade I listed buildings in Wiltshire
- Grade II* listed buildings in Wiltshire

== Sources ==
- Orbach, Julian; Pevsner, Nikolaus; Cherry, Bridget (2021), Wiltshire, The Buildings of England, New Haven and London: Yale University Press, ISBN 978-0-300-25120-3
