= Aston Valley Barrow Cemetery =

Group of Bronze Age burial mounds in England

- Ashton Valley Barrow Cemetery
- Location within Wiltshire
- 51.1853°N 2.0301°W
- Type: Barrow cemetery
- Periods: Bronze Age
- Location: Wiltshire
- Region: Southern England

Site notes
- Material: Chalk
- Archaeologists: Sir Richard Colt Hoare, W.F.Cunnington, L.Grinsell, Rev.E.H.Steele

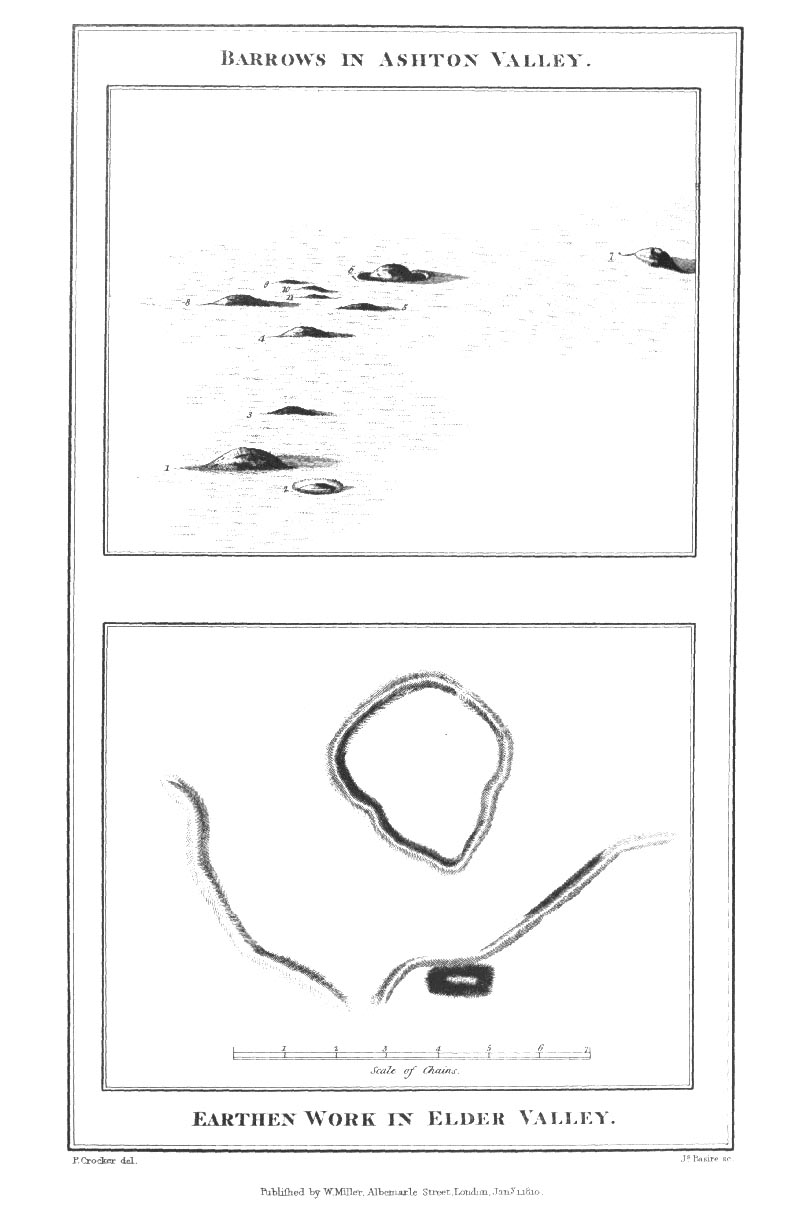
A pencil sketch showing, in the upper plate, the original arrangement of the barrows, from The Ancient History of Wiltshire, by Sir Richard Colt-Hoare, 1810

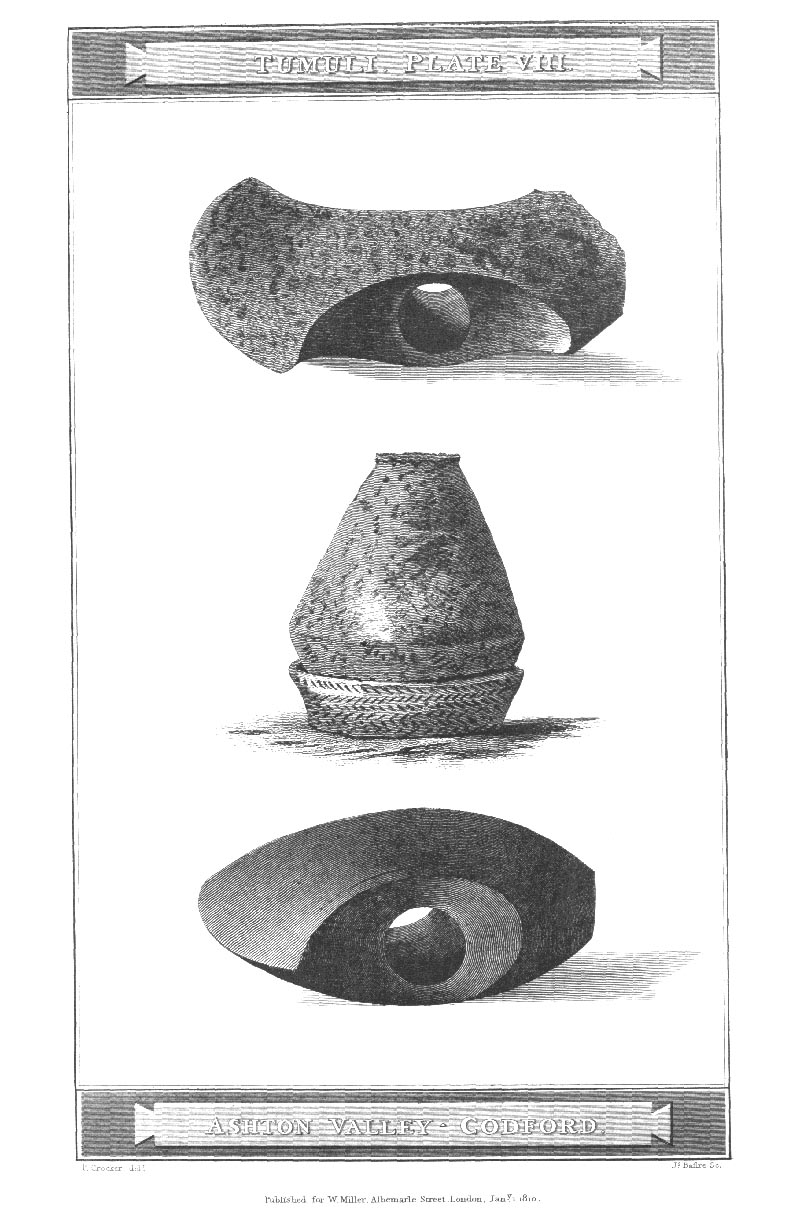
A pencil sketch showing some of the artefacts found within the barrows at Ashton Valley, from The Ancient History of Wiltshire, by Sir Richard Colt-Hoare, 1810

The Aston Valley Barrow Cemetery, or Ashton Valley Barrow Cemetery, is a group of Bronze Age bowl barrow and bell barrow tumuli on the south facing edge of Codford Down on the west side of the valley of the Chitterne Brook, within the civil parish of Codford, in Wiltshire, England. There were originally ten bowl barrows and a single bell barrow, but some of these have now been ploughed out: only the bell barrow and five bowl barrows survive. The site is a scheduled monument.

== Context ==
The site lies in close proximity to Codford Circle, an Iron Age hillfort or enclosure some 2 km (1.2 miles) to the southeast, and Knook Castle, an Iron Age hillfort a similar distance to the northwest.

== Archaeology ==
Excavations at the barrows have revealed many Bronze Age and some possible Saxon urned cremations and other interments. The barrows were originally excavated by W.F. Cunnington in 1801, and recorded by Sir R. Colt-Hoare, with later excavations by the Reverend E.H. Steele in 1957; and with further correlations by Leslie Grinsell, also in 1957. Some burials and items were left in place by Cunnington, but others are now preserved at the Wiltshire Museum in Devizes.

The excavations by Colt-Hoare and Cunnington in the 1800s revealed most of the finds and interments. However, as the three-age system had not yet been introduced, and they were unable to properly date their finds, they were at a disadvantage when trying to interpret them.

The following table includes details for the eleven barrows and associated finds:

A list of the Barrows at Ashton Valley
Name/reference	Location	Type	Size	NMR number	Description and finds
Barrow A Monument no.887655	grid reference ST97914268	Bowl barrow	23.5 m (25.7 yd) wide by 2.2 m (7.2 ft) high	ST 94 SE 54	The largest barrow in the cemetery. Finds included cremated remains of a primary burial within a large urn and other secondary remains including nine smaller cremation urns, sherds and burnt bones.
Barrow B Monument no.887681	grid reference ST97914274	Bowl barrow	20 m (22 yd) wide by 1.0 m (3.3 ft) high	ST 94 SE 55	Contained a probable Bronze Age cremation.
Barrow C Monument no.887692	grid reference ST97914277	Bowl barrow	15.5 m (17.0 yd) wide by 0.3 m (0.98 ft) high	ST 94 SE 56	No finds.
Barrow D Monument no.887703	grid reference ST97894280	Bell barrow	22.5 m (24.6 yd) wide by 2.8 m (9.2 ft) high	ST 94 SE 57	Surrounding quarry ditch 5 m (5.5 yd) wide and 0.5 m (0.55 yd) deep. Contained a cremation beneath an inverted Bronze Age urn along with a perforated dolerite battle-axe or hammer.
Barrow E Monument no.887709	grid reference ST97874277	Bowl barrow	21 m (23 yd) wide by 0.4 m (1.3 ft) high	ST 94 SE 58	Contained a primary cremation along with a granodiorite battle axe and a bone point.
Barrow F Monument no.887713	grid reference ST98044280	Bowl barrow	30 m (33 yd) wide by 1 m (3.3 ft) high	ST 94 SE 59, ST 94 SE 60	Contained a primary cremation and a later Saxon inhumation along with a fir-wood bucket bound with bronze, and a possible sword or spearhead.
Barrow G Monument no.887718	grid reference ST97954269	Bowl barrow	now ploughed out	ST 94 SE 61	Contained a circular shaft with a nearby possible cremation, and other secondary cremations with urn fragments.
Barrow H Monument no.887751	grid reference ST97904290	Bowl barrow	now ploughed out	ST 94 SE 62	Contained a human burial in a wooden coffin.
Barrow J Monument no.887757	grid reference ST97844280	Bowl barrow	now ploughed out	ST 94 SE 63	Contained a cremation within a crushed urn.
Barrow K Monument no.888063	grid reference ST97864280	Bowl barrow	now ploughed out	ST 94 SE 64	Contained a cremation (possibly two) within urns.
Barrow L Monument no.888065	grid reference ST97884279	Bowl barrow	now ploughed out	ST 94 SE 65	Contained a cremation within a crushed urn.
