= Upton Lovell =

Village in Wiltshire, England

Coordinates: 51.166°N 2.079°W

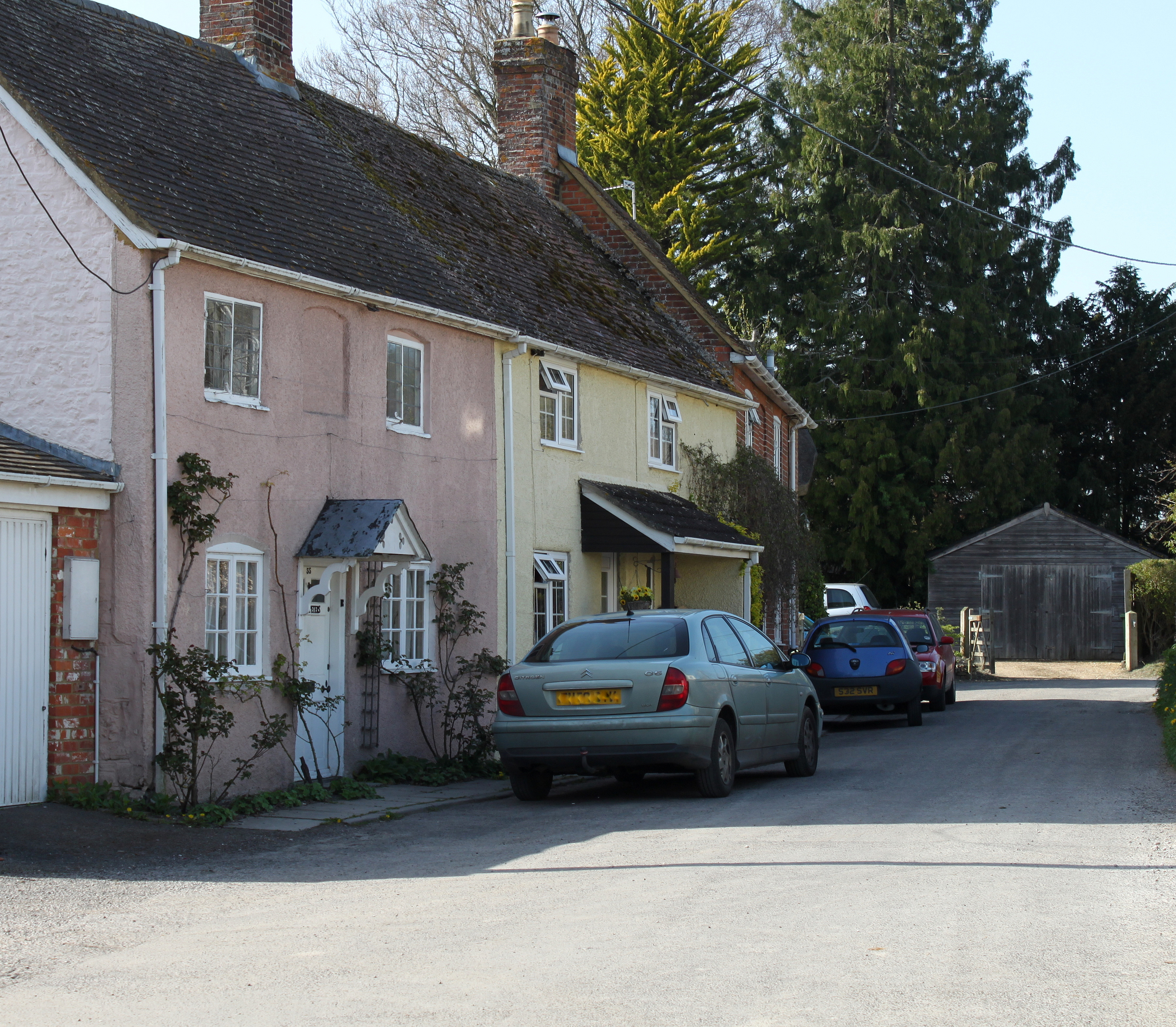
- Cottages in Up Street, Upton Lovell, 2011

- Location within Wiltshire
- Population: 165 (in 2011)
- OS grid reference: ST946408
- Unitary authority: Wiltshire
- Ceremonial county: Wiltshire
- Region: South West
- Country: England
- Sovereign state: United Kingdom
- Post town: Warminster
- Postcode district: BA12
- Dialling code: 01985
- Police: Wiltshire
- Fire: Dorset and Wiltshire
- Ambulance: South Western
- UK Parliament: South West Wiltshire

Upton Lovell is a village and civil parish in Wiltshire, England. It lies on the A36, in the Wylye valley about 5 miles (8 km) southeast of Warminster. The parish is on the left (northeast) bank of the river, and stretches for over two miles northeast onto Salisbury Plain.

== History ==
Upton Great Barrow, on the high ground of Knook Horse Hill, is a Bronze Age bell barrow, with a central mound 34 m in diameter and 2.5 m high. When Colt Hoare excavated it, around 1812, he found a cremation with a necklace of amber, shale and earthenware beads; the necklace is now at the Wiltshire Museum, Devizes. Earlier, William Cunnington had opened nearby bowl barrows and found cremations with grave goods including a bronze dagger. Further north are two rare saucer barrows.

Knook Castle, in the north of the parish, is the site of an Iron Age hillfort. The large field system on Codford Down (Iron Age or Romano-British) extends into the parish. The Domesday Book in 1086 recorded a settlement at Uptone with 23 households and one mill, held by Gerald of Wilton.

The village of Upton Lovell is an ancient settlement, with a medieval church dedicated to St Augustine of Canterbury. The name of Lovel was added while five generations of the Lords Lovel were lords of the manor between the 14th and 16th centuries.

The Salisbury branch line was opened through the Wylye valley in 1856, passing just south of Upton Lovell village, with a level crossing on Water Street. The local stations at Heytesbury and Codford closed in 1955, but the line remains open as the Warminster to Salisbury section of the Wessex Main Line.

The village's pub is called the Prince Leopold, in memory of Prince Leopold, Duke of Albany, the youngest son of Queen Victoria, who lived at Boyton Manor in the neighbouring village of Boyton. He died of haemophilia in 1884.

== Parish church ==
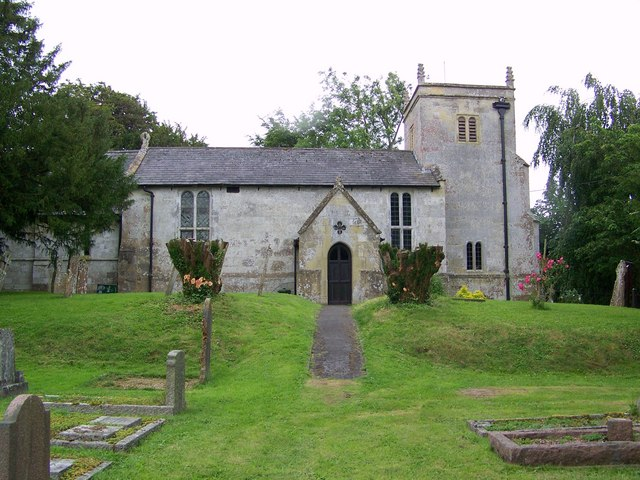
St Augustine's Church

The small parish church, dedicated to St Augustine of Canterbury, is built in limestone ashlar and dates from the 13th century. The nave was rebuilt in 1633, and the west tower was added in the same century. Following restoration in 1891 by C.E. Ponting, the only clearly 13th-century features are the chancel arch (described as "good" by Pevsner) and – inside the chancel – roll-moulded string courses, a trefoil piscina, and an aumbry. The font is 12th-century, on a 19th-century base. Monuments include a late 14th-century effigy of a knight – probably John, 5th Baron Lovel (1341–1408) – and a 15th-century brass of a priest.

The building was recorded as Grade I listed in 1968.

The benefice was united with those of Codford and Stockton in 1973. Today the parish is served by the Upper Wylye Valley team ministry. The parish registers are kept at the Wiltshire and Swindon History Centre for the years 1654–1992 (baptisms), 1654–1975 (marriages), and 1653–1991 (burials).

== Local government ==
Upton Lovell has its own parish council but almost all local government functions are carried out by Wiltshire Council, a unitary authority created in 2009, with its principal offices at County Hall in Trowbridge. The village is represented in parliament by Andrew Murrison and in Wiltshire Council by Christopher Newbury, both Conservatives.

== Notable people ==
- Antony Barrington Brown (1927–2012), photographer and expedition member, and his wife the sculptor Althea Wynne (1936–2012), lived at Upton Lovell in later life.
- James Dowdle (1840-1900), Commissioner in the Salvation Army

== In fiction ==
Upton Lovell appears in W. H. Hudson's book A Shepherd's Life, under the name of Doveton.

== See also ==
- Upton Lovell Shaman - an important Bronze Age bowl barrow burial
