= Upton Lovell Shaman =

Bronze Age human body found in England

Coordinates: 51.1842°N 2.0608°W

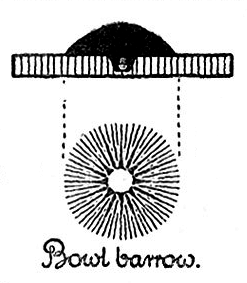
A 1929 diagram illustrating a bowl barrow

The Upton Lovell Shaman is a Bronze Age woman who was buried in a bowl barrow near Upton Lovell in Wiltshire, South West England. The skeleton, and the large amount of grave goods that were found with it, "is viewed as among the most significant bronze age burials in Britain." The burial was discovered and excavated in 1801 or 1802 by William Cunnington, who considered the remains to be those of a male. A more recent excavation and DNA testing of the barrow's skeleton have found the individual to be female.

== Archaeological context ==
The barrow is on high ground above the Wylye valley near Upton Lovell, and is known in recent scientific literature as "Upton Lovell G2a". It was first excavated in either 1802 or 1801 by William Cunnington, who described the barrow as being 40 feet (12 m) in diameter and only 15–18 inches (38–46 cm) high, with a small depression in the centre. He uncovered the centrally-placed burial chamber in an oval cist (stone-lined box) at a depth of 3 feet (91 cm). The so-called shaman was buried lying on their back with their head to the north; a second individual was buried in a seated position. Cunnington assumed the main burial was that of a man based on the "largeness of the bones", and that the seated individual was his wife. In the area of the shaman's chest was a stone axe and over 20 bone points. On the legs were pierced boar tusks and five cups made of what he called "eaglestones"; at the feet he found more than 36 bone points and several more stone axes. A ring and beads of black stone belonged to either the shaman or the second individual.

== Analysis of the skeleton ==
In 2000, the area underwent another excavation. Human remains were recovered from the burial and gold was found on some of the tools from the grave. Very little of the original barrow structure remains within the landscape. The barrow is considered to be a Wessex I grave type, in the Wessex culture. Though Historic England cannot list the obliterated round barrow gravesite because of condition issues, its publication Stonehenge World Historic Site - an archaeological research framework puts the shaman burial within the Stonehenge landscape, calling it "Upton Lovell barrow 4". Another Historic England publication about the general Stonehenge area states "although in one grave – Upton Lovell G2a, Wiltshire – the finds have been interpreted as attachments for a shaman's robe."

Results from an extensive analysis of the burial goods in the G2a burial by specialists from the University of Leicester were published in 2022. The results revealed traces of gold and wear patterns on the stone tools, indicating that the various implements were part of a "goldworking toolkit".

The burial had previously been considered to be that of a male spiritual leader and metalworker, due to the breadth of its accompanying items. A DNA analysis published in 2026, however, showed the remains to be those of a female. The Francis Crick Institute studied the skeleton's DNA and among their conclusions are that the woman was around 45 years of age, with an arthritic right wrist. Information about the shaman is presented in the July 2026 – July 2027 We Go Way Back exhibit at the Institute. The Wiltshire Museum has items from the shaman burial on exhibit.

== See also ==
- Stonehenge World Heritage Site
