= Keith Vaughan =

British artist (1912–1977)

- Born: John Keith Vaughan; 23 August 1912; Selsey, West Sussex, England
- Died: 4 November 1977 (aged 65); London, England
- Education: self-taught
- Known for: painting
- Movement: Neo-romanticism, Abstract painting

John Keith Vaughan (23 August 1912 – 4 November 1977) was a British painter, graphic artist, illustrator, photographer, teacher and journal writer. Although mainly working with oil paint, he is also considered one of Britain's finest exponents of gouache painting. His main subjects were: male nudes, landscapes (esp. Essex landscapes) and still lifes. Among his key works are a 22-meter-long mural at the Festival of Britain (1951; destroyed) and his nine Assembly of Figures paintings (1951—1976). His work is held in public collections in the United Kingdom, the United States, Australia and various other countries.

== Biography ==
=== Early life ===
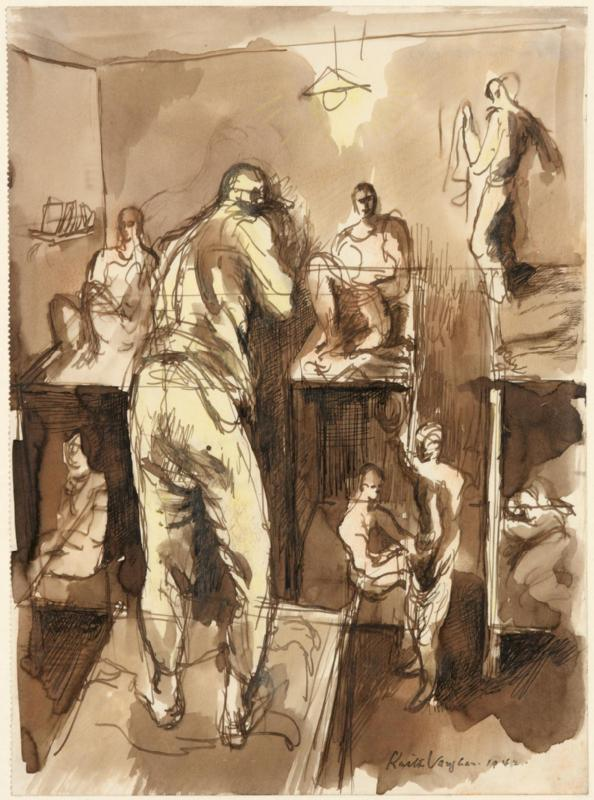
A Barrack-room (1942) by Keith Vaughan

Keith Vaughan was born at Selsey in West Sussex. After his father abandoned his wife and two sons, the family moved to North London. From 1921-30, he was a boarder at Christ's Hospital school in Horsham, where the art master, H.A. Rigby, encouraged him to develop his artistic talents. From 1931-39 he worked at Lintas advertising agency. In his spare time he took up photography and painting. He visited Paris and various places in Germany. On leaving Lintas, he spent a year painting in the country. Around this time, he began writing his private journal, which he kept until his death.

At the outbreak of World War II, he joined the St. John Ambulance as an intending conscientious objector. He was conscripted into the Non-Combatant Corps in 1941, then into the Royal Pioneer Corps, working as a clerk and German interpreter. His younger brother, Dick, joined the Royal Air Force and was killed at age twenty-five in 1940.

=== Artistic career ===
Vaughan was self-taught as an artist. His first exhibitions took place during the war. In 1942 he was stationed at Ashton Gifford near Codford in Wiltshire, and paintings from this time include The Wall at Ashton Gifford (Manchester Art Gallery).

During the war Vaughan formed friendships with the painters Graham Sutherland, Prunella Clough and John Minton, with whom after demobilisation in 1946 he shared premises. Through these contacts he formed part of the neo-romantic circle of the immediate post-war period. However, Vaughan rapidly developed an idiosyncratic style which moved him away from the Neo-Romantics. Concentrating on studies of male figures, his works became increasingly abstract.

=== Teaching career ===
During the post-war years, Vaughan worked as an art teacher in London, first at the Camberwell College of Arts, from around 1950 at the Central School of Arts and Crafts. Throughout the 1960s and 70s he taught mostly part-time at the Slade School of Fine Art.

=== Later life and death ===
Vaughan was diagnosed with cancer in 1975. He underwent surgery and radiotherapy but became increasingly depressed and unable to work. During the last year of his life, he received counseling and assistance from his old friend and doctor, Patrick Woodcock. He died by taking a drugs overdose in 1977 in his London studio, recording his last moments in his diary.

== Legacy ==
=== Notable paintings ===
One of Vaughan's key works was a large mural (3.5 × 22 metres) that he painted in the Dome of Discovery on London's South Bank as part of the Festival of Britain (1951). The mural depicted Theseus holding up a light torch amidst explorers. The painting reflected the optimism of the time, the overall theme of the exhibition. After having been viewed by millions of people, the mural was destroyed along with the pavilion in late 1951. Several studies remain.

From 1951 to 1976 Vaughan produced Assembly of Figures, a set of nine major oil paintings. He created several other series of related works with similar titles, such as Small Assembly of Figures (1951-53), Small Red Assembly (1963), Blue Assembly of Figures (1964), Dark Assembly (1964), Red Assembly (1964), and the large paintings Crowd Assembling I and II (1967-68). All these paintings are of male nude or semi-nude figures set in semi-abstracted landscapes and engaged in undetermined activities.

=== Art market ===
His auction record of £313,250 was set at Sotheby's, London, on 11 November 2009, for the oil on canvas Theseus and the Minotaur, previously in the collection of Richard Attenborough (who bought it in 1967).

=== Journals ===
Vaughan is also known for his 61 journals, spanning 38 years, from 1939 to the final moments in 1977 where he lost consciousness prior to his chosen death. Selections from his journals were published in 1942 and 1966, and more extensively in 1983—84, 1989, 2012 and 2023, after his death. A gay man troubled by his sexuality, he is known largely through those journals. His journal entry of July 18, 1965 illustrates his struggles as a gay man in a society that rejected homosexuality:

It is difficult to bear in mind that with all one's honours, distinctions and successes etc. one remains a member of the criminal class. My sexual relationships, on the rare occasions where they have been succesful [sic], would, or could, earn me at least life imprisonment if known and prosecuted. How can one feel part of one's time and society in that case?

— Keith Vaughan, Journal (18 July 1965)

== Exhibitions ==
1944
Keith Vaughan: Gouaches and Drawings, Alex Reid and Lefevre Gallery, London

1946
Keith Vaughan: Paintings and Gouaches, Alex Reid and Lefevre Gallery, London

1948
Keith Vaughan: Paintings and Gouaches, George Dix Gallery, New York
Keith Vaughan: Paintings, Gouaches and Monotypes, Alex Reid and Lefevre Gallery, London

1950
Keith Vaughan: Paintings and Gouaches, Instituto de Arte Moderno, Buenos Aires
Gouaches, Redfern Gallery, London

1951
Keith Vaughan: Paintings and Gouaches, Alex Reid and Lefevre Gallery, London

1952
Keith Vaughan: Retrospective Exhibition, Redfern Gallery, London
Keith Vaughan – Drawings for Rimbaud: Une Saison en Enfer, Hanover Gallery, London
Keith Vaughan: Paintings and Gouaches, Durlacher Bros, New York

1953
Keith Vaughan: Paintings, Leicester Galleries, London

1955
Keith Vaughan: Gouaches, Leicester Galleries, London
Keith Vaughan: Paintings and Gouaches, Durlacher Bros, New York

1956
Keith Vaughan: New Paintings, Leicester Galleries, London
Keith Vaughan: Retrospective Show, Hatton Gallery, Newcastle

1957
Keith Vaughan: Travelling Retrospective (based on Keith Vaughan: Retrospective Show, Hatton Gallery, Newcastle), Arts Council
Keith Vaughan: Paintings and Gouaches, Durlacher Bros, New York

1958
Keith Vaughan: Paintings, Leicester Galleries, London

1959
Keith Vaughan: Paintings and Gouaches, Iowa State University, Ames, IA
Keith Vaughan, Leicester Galleries, London

1960
Keith Vaughan: Paintings, Gouaches and Drawings, Matthiesen Gallery, London

1962
Keith Vaughan: Retrospective Exhibition, Whitechapel Gallery, London

1963
Keith Vaughan: Drawings, São Paulo Art Biennial

1964
Keith Vaughan: Paintings, Gouaches and Charcoals, Marlborough New London Gallery, London

1965
Keith Vaughan: Gouaches, Bear Lane Gallery, Oxford
Keith Vaughan: Recent Gouaches, Marlborough Fine Art, London

1966
Keith Vaughan: Paintings, Durlacher Bros, New York

1967
Keith Vaughan: Retrospective Drawings, Tib Lane Gallery, Manchester

1968
Keith Vaughan: Gouaches, Rex Evans Gallery, Los Angeles, CA
Keith Vaughan: New Paintings, Marlborough Fine Art, London
Keith Vaughan: Gouaches and Drawings 1942–46, Hamet Gallery, London

1969
Keith Vaughan: Retrospective Exhibition, Mappin Gallery, Sheffield
Keith Vaughan: Drawings, Tib Lane Gallery, Manchester

1970
Keith Vaughan: Paintings, Gouaches and Drawings, Bear Lane Gallery, Oxford
Keith Vaughan: Gouaches and Drawings, Hamet Gallery, London
Keith Vaughan: Retrospective, University of York, York

1973
Keith Vaughan: New Paintings, Waddington Galleries, London
Keith Vaughan: Paintings in Gouaches, Victor Waddington Gallery, London

1976
Keith Vaughan: New Paintings and Gouaches, Waddington Galleries, London
Keith Vaughan: Paintings, Gouaches and Drawings, Tib Lane Gallery, Manchester
Keith Vaughan: Paintings and Gouaches and Drawings, Compass Gallery, Glasgow

1977
Keith Vaughan: Memorial Exhibition, Mappin Art Gallery, Sheffield

1981
Keith Vaughan: Images of Man: Figurative Paintings: 1946–1960, Geffrye Museum, London, and Birmingham City Museum and Art Gallery

1985
Keith Vaughan: Drawings and Paintings, New Grafton Gallery, London
Keith Vaughan: Early Drawings and Gouaches, Thomas Agnew & Sons, London

1987
Keith Vaughan: Paintings and Drawings, New Grafton Gallery, London
Keith Vaughan: Paintings, Gouaches, Watercolours and Drawings 1936–76, Austin/Desmond Fine Art, Sunninghill
Keith Vaughan: Paintings, Watercolours and Drawings, Mercury Gallery, Edinburgh
Keith Vaughan: Works on Paper, Garry Anderson Gallery, Darlinghurst

1989
Keith Vaughan, Austin/Desmond Fine Art, London
Keith Vaughan: Gouaches, Drawings, Notebook Sketches, Redfern Gallery, London

1990
Keith Vaughan: Retrospective, Thomas Agnew & Sons, London
Keith Vaughan: Paintings, Drawings, Gouaches, Anthony Hepworth Fine Art, Bath

1991
Drawings of the Young Male, St Jude's, London
Keith Vaughan: Drawings, Anthony Hepworth Fine Art, Bath

1994
Keith Vaughan: Works on Paper, Redfern Gallery, London

1995
Keith Vaughan: Les Illuminations de Rimbaud, an Exhibition of 42 Drawings, Deka, London
Keith Vaughan: Paintings, Drawings and Gouaches, Anthony Hepworth Fine Art, Bath

1999
Keith Vaughan: Gouaches and Drawings, Anthony Hepworth Fine Art, Bath

2000
Keith Vaughan: Paintings, Gouaches, Drawings and Lithographs, Julian Lax, London

2002
Keith Vaughan: Retrospective, Winter Fine Art and Antiques Fair, Olympia, London

2004
Keith Vaughan: Drawings, Anthony Hepworth Fine Art, Bath

2007
Keith Vaughan: Figure and Landscape, Victoria Art Gallery, Bath
Keith Vaughan: A Selection of Early Work from the Collection of Peter Adam, Anthony Hepworth Fine Art, Bath
Keith Vaughan: Paintings and Drawings, Osborne Samuel Gallery, London

2009
Keith Vaughan: Drawings, Abbott and Holder, London

2010
Drawings and Sketches for Paintings 1945–1960, Austin/Desmond Fine Art, London
Keith Vaughan: Four Decades of Drawing, Gallery 27, London

2011
Keith Vaughan: Gouaches, Drawings and Prints, Osborne Samuel Gallery, London
Keith Vaughan: Works on Paper, Anthony Hepworth Fine Art, Bath

2012
Keith Vaughan, Thomas Agnew & Sons, London
Keith Vaughan: Works on Paper from the Estate of Keith Vaughan, Anthony Hepworth Fine Art, Bath
Keith Vaughan: Romanticism to Abstraction, Pallant House Gallery, Chichester
Keith Vaughan, Osborne Samuel Gallery, London
2019
Myth, Mortality and the Male Figure, Osborne Samuel Gallery, London
2023
Keith Vaughan: Image and Anxiety, Osborne Samuel Gallery, London
2026
Keith Vaughan: States of Tension, Osborne Samuel Gallery, London

== Public Collections (selection) ==
Vaughan's work is held in the following public collections:

UK

- Government Art Collection (7 works as of 19 April 2023)
- British Council
- Tate (12 works as of 26 October 2025)
- National Portrait Gallery, London (1 work as of 19 April 2023)
- Victoria and Albert Museum, London (32 objects as of 19 April 2023)
- British Museum, London
- Imperial War Museum, London
- Courtauld Gallery, London
- The Lightbox, Woking
- Worthing Museum and Art Gallery
- Pallant House Gallery, Chichester
- Southampton City Art Gallery
- Ashmolean Museum, Oxford
- Birmingham Museum and Art Gallery
- National Museum Cardiff
- Fitzwilliam Museum, Cambridge
- Sainsbury Centre for Visual Arts, Norwich
- York Art Gallery
- Graves Art Gallery, Sheffield
- Leeds Art Gallery
- Bradford District Museums & Galleries
- Manchester Art Gallery
- Walker Art Gallery, Liverpool
- Middlesbrough Institute of Modern Art
- Sunderland Museum and Winter Gardens
- Laing Art Gallery, Newcastle
- Hatton Gallery, Newcastle
- Scottish National Gallery of Modern Art, Edinburgh (5 works as of 19 April 2023)
- Aberdeen Art Gallery

Australia

- Art Gallery of New South Wales, Sydney
- National Gallery of Victoria, Melbourne
- Art Gallery of South Australia, Adelaide

Canada

- Art Gallery of Ontario, Toronto

Israel

- Tel Aviv Museum of Art

New Zealand

- Auckland Art Gallery Toi o Tāmaki
- Dunedin Public Art Gallery

Portugal

- Calouste Gulbenkian Foundation, Lisbon

USA

- Yale Center for British Art, New Haven, CT
- Yale University Art Gallery, New Haven, CT
- Wadsworth Atheneum, Hartford, CT
- Buffalo AKG Art Museum, NY
- The Phillips Collection, Washington, DC
- Art Institute of Chicago, IL

== Bibliography (selection) ==
- 1942: Keith Vaughan, Journal Extract. Penguin New Writing, no. 12
- 1944: Keith Vaughan, Some Notes on the Art of Illustration. Penguin New Writing, no. 22
- 1947: Keith Vaughan, A view of English Painting. Penguin New Writing, no. 31
- 1966: Keith Vaughan & Alan Ross (ed.), Journals and Drawings 1939–1965. London: Alan Ross, 219 pages
- 1978: Alan Ross, 'Obituary Notes, Keith Vaughan', in: London Magazine, vol. 17, no. 8, February
- 1983-84: Keith Vaughan, Keith Vaughan Journal Extracts, in: London Journal, vol. 22, no. 12; vol. 23, nos. 1, 2 & 3; vol. 24, no. 3
- 1989: Keith Vaughan & Alan Ross (ed.), Journals 1939–1977, London: John Murray, 217 pages, ISBN 0-7195-4732-6
- 1990: Malcolm Yorke, Keith Vaughan, His Life and Work. London: Constable, 288 pages (hardback), ISBN 0-09-469780-9
- 2012: Keith Vaughan & Gerard Hastings (ed.), Drawing to a Close: The Final Journals of Keith Vaughan. London: Pagham Press, 264 pages (hardback), ISBN 978-0-9571796-0-8
- 2013: Gerard Hastings, Keith Vaughan: The Photographs. London: Pagham Press, ISBN 978-0-9571796-15
- 2016: Gerard Hastings, Paradise Found & Lost: Keith Vaughan in Essex. London: Pagham Press, 96 pages (paperback), ISBN 978-0-9571796-39
- 2017: Gerard Hastings, Awkward Artefacts: The ‘Erotic Fantasies’ of Keith Vaughan. London: Pagham Press, 137 pages (paperback), ISBN 978-0-9571796-46
- 2023: Alex Belsey, Image of a Man: The Journal of Keith Vaughan. Liverpool University Press, 270 pages (paperback), ISBN 978-1802078244
