= Knook Castle =

Iron Age hillfort in Wiltshire, England

Coordinates: 51.1954°N 2.0585°W

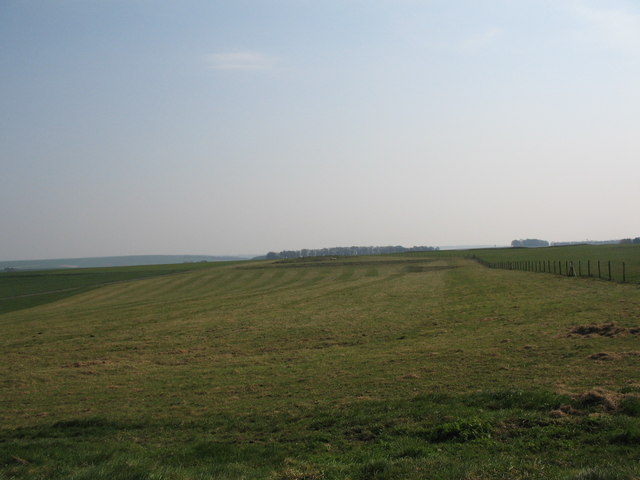

- Location within Wiltshire
- Type: sub-rectangular univallate hillfort
- Periods: Iron Age
- Location: Wiltshire
- Region: Southern England

Site notes
- Material: Chalk
- Area: 1.75 hectares (4.3 acres)
- Archaeologists: Sir Richard Colt Hoare, William Cunnington, Petrie, Grinsell
- Public access: footpaths

Knook Castle is the site of an Iron Age univallate hillfort on Knook Down, near the village of Knook in Wiltshire, England, but largely within the civil parish of Upton Lovell. It has also been interpreted as a defensive cattle enclosure associated with nearby Romano-British settlements. It is roughly rectangular in plan with a single entrance on the south/south-east side, but with a later break in the wall on the western side. The site is a scheduled monument.

John Marius Wilson's Imperial Gazetteer of England and Wales (1870–1872) described Knook Castle as follows:

Knook Castle is an ancient single ditched entrenchment, of about two acres; is supposed to have been originally a British village, and afterwards a Roman summer camp; and has yielded Roman coins. Traces of another ancient British village are to the N. "The site of these villages", says Sir R. Hoare, "is decidedly marked by great cavities and a black soil; and the attentive eye may easily trace out the lines of houses and the streets, or rather the hollow ways, conducting to them. Numerous tumuli and barrows are in the neighbourhood."

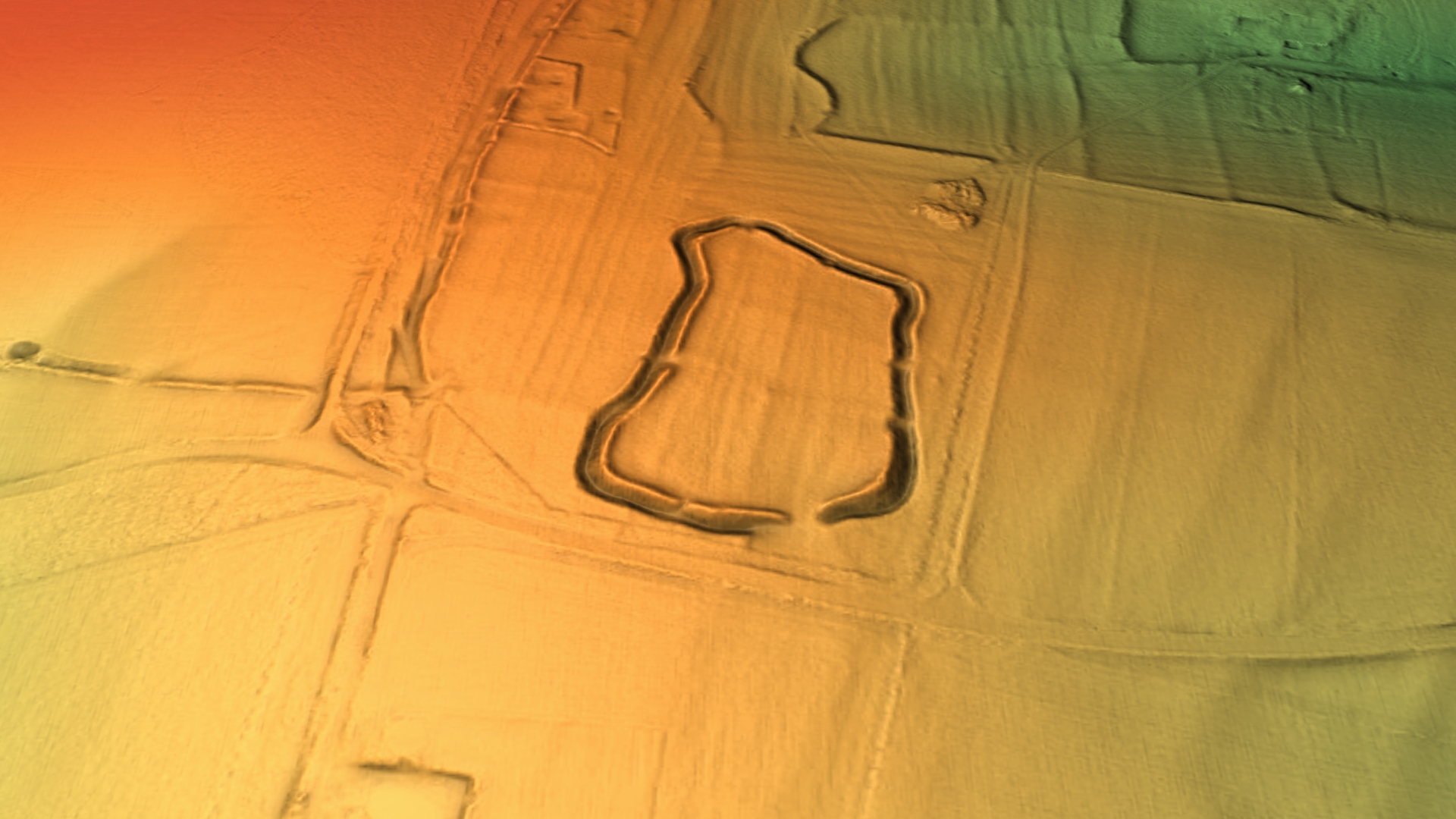
3D view of the digital terrain model

The site and surrounding downs are easily accessible by public footpath, with the Imber Range perimeter path running east to west immediately to the north of the site. Further to the north lies Imber Range, one of the military firing ranges of Salisbury Plain.

== Romano British Settlements ==
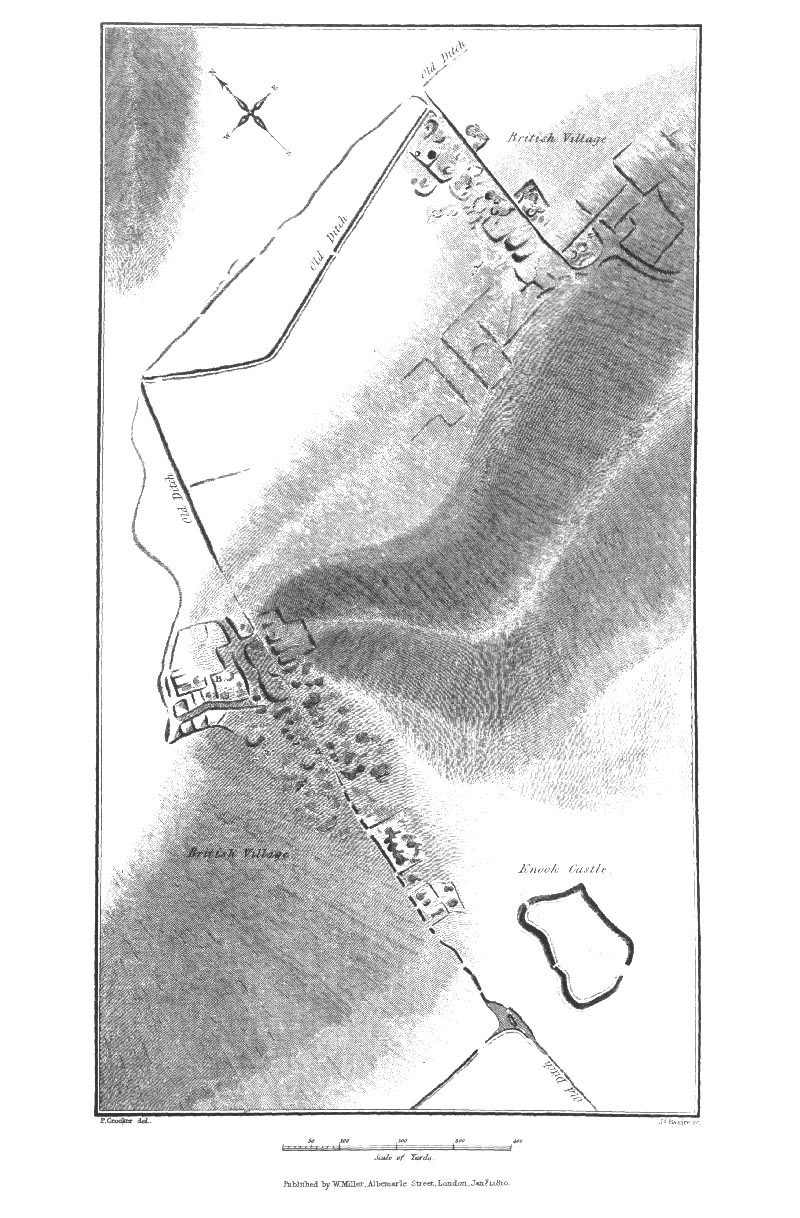
A pencil sketch of Knook Castle and the adjacent Romano-British settlerments of Knook Down East and Knook Down West, from The Ancient History of Wiltshire, by Sir Richard Colt Hoare, 1810.

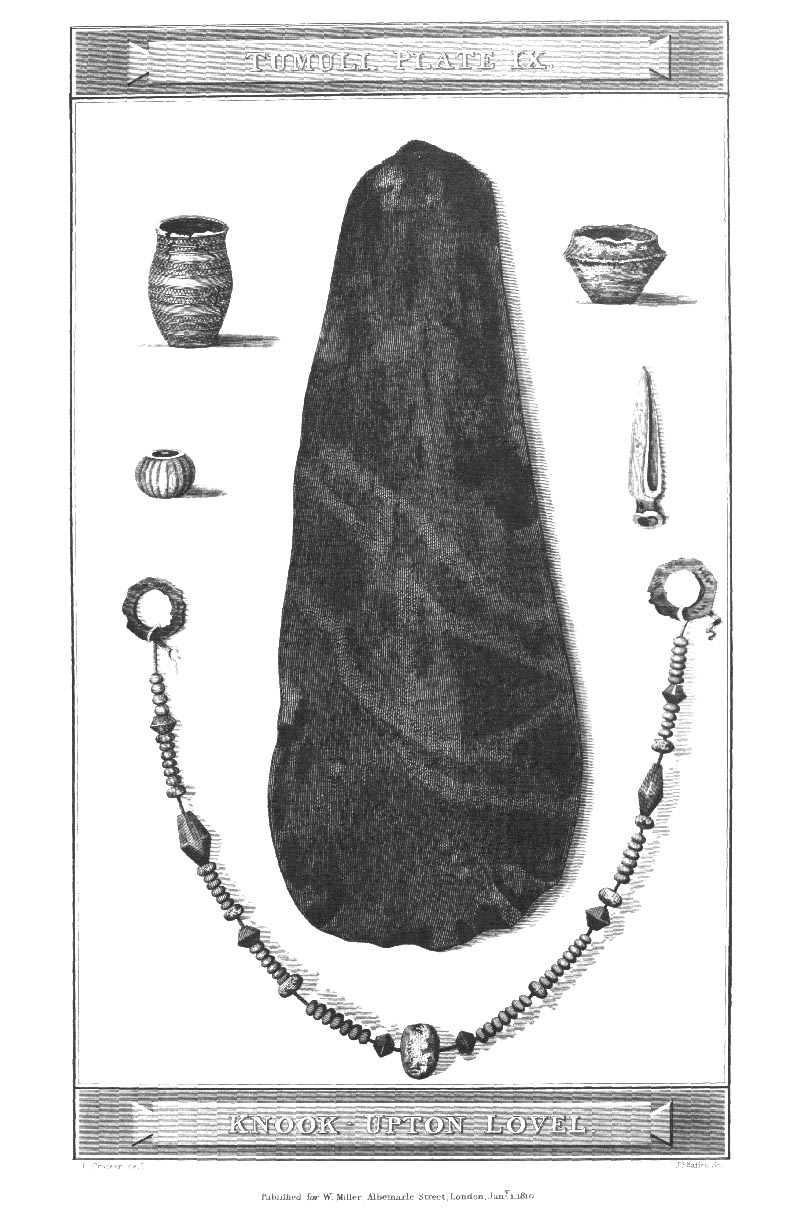
A pencil sketch showing findings from tumuli within Knook and Upton Lovell parishes, from The Ancient History of Wiltshire, by Sir Richard Colt Hoare, 1810

Nearby, some 300m to the north of the hillfort, and slightly further to the north east, are the sites of two Romano British settlements of Knook Down East and Knook Down West. They lie approximately 600m apart and are linked by an earlier linear ditch or hollow way.

Knook Down East covers approximately 4 ha (9.9 acres) and is well preserved around a central trackway feature that runs north to south, with 11no. surrounding scooped platforms and enclosures. Knook Down West covers approximately 11 ha (27 acres) and may comprise two distinct settlements. The northern side of the site has a central area off of which are five trackways that serve a number of enclosures. On the southern side of the site are three enclosures. Between the two areas lies a field system, with the north and south sides linked by a trackway, which follows the line of a pre-Roman linear ditch.

Finds at the sites and the surrounding areas date predominantly from the 2nd to 4th centuries AD, and include bones, bracelets, nails, door-furniture, Roman coins, stone flooring, hearths with painted stucco and brick, and burial remains found with a basalt axe.

Possible associated landscape features also include for extensive surrounding field systems, boundary earthworks, ponds, two corn-drying kilns, and the outline of a possible small amphitheatre, or circus.

== Archaeology ==
Excavations at the hillfort and the surrounding areas have revealed many items from Neolithic, Bronze Age, Iron Age and Romano-British periods. Most of the various finds discovered are now preserved at the Wiltshire Museum in Devizes.

Most recently in the 1950s, the archaeologist Leslie Grinsell has reviewed and indexed the site and surrounding features. Earlier excavations by Sir Richard Colt Hoare and William Cunnington in the 1800s revealed most of the various finds and interments. However, as the three-age system had not yet been introduced, they were unable to date their finds and therefore were at a disadvantage when trying to interpret them. The following table includes for details of the nearby surrounding tumuli, barrows, and other ancient features. The tumuli and barrows are referenced by Grinsells reference system which uses the original parish name. Only the Knook referenced sites are shown here although there are many other Grinsell referenced tumuli also to be found nearby which fall into the adjacent parishes of Chitterne, Codford, and Heytesbury; some of which form part of the Aston Valley Barrow Cemetery, some 2000m to the south-east of the hillfort.

A list of local tumuli, barrows and other ancient monuments
Name/reference	Location	Type	Size	NMR number	Description and finds
Knook 1 (Grinsell)	grid reference ST93694128	Bowl barrow	50 yd (46 m) wide by 3 ft (0.91 m) high	ST 94 SW 40	A large bowl barrow on the flood plain of the River Wylye, now much spread out by ploughing, with the original ditches now filled and covered.
Knook 1a (Grinsell)	grid reference ST95464431	Bowl barrow	15 yd (14 m) wide by 0.75 ft (0.23 m) high	ST 94 SE 19	Originally excavated by W.F.Cunnington in 1812 and was found to contain an upturned burial urn with a broken bronze dagger.
Knook Barrow, Knook 2 (Grinsell)	grid reference ST95614461	Long Barrow	100 ft (30 m) long by 50 ft (15 m) wide by 6 ft (1.8 m) high	ST 94 SE 21	Originally excavated by W.F.Cunnington in 1801–02. Finds included for seven or eight cremated bodies. A further four headless skeletons are thought to be of later Saxon origin.
Knook 3 (Grinsell)	grid reference ST95604457, 30m to the west of Knook Long barrow (ST 94 SE 18).	Bowl Barrow	12 m (39 ft) wide by 0.8 m (2.6 ft) high	ST 94 SE 20	Originally excavated by W.F.Cunnington in the 1800s, and found to contain a cremation beneath an inverted urn with a bronze dagger.
Knook 4 (Grinsell)	grid reference ST96564549	Bowl Barrow	17 yd (16 m) wide by 2.5 ft (0.76 m) high	ST 94 NE 15	A bowl barrow with a narrow ditch and a bank. Originally excavated by Richard Colt-Hoare in 1812 and found to contain a neat cremation including for a brassbuckle and skeletal remains of a horse. The Bowl Barrows referenced Knook/Chitterne 4a and 4b lie close by.
Knook 4a & 4b (Grinsell)	grid reference ST965455	Bowl Barrows	No visible remains	ST 94 NE 28	Two round barrows first noted in 1913 by M.E.Cunnington during excavation of the barrow ST 94 NE 15.
Knook 5 (Grinsell)	grid reference ST96754625	Long Barrow	No visible remains, destroyed 1939–45, was approx 78 ft (24 m) long by 3 ft (0.91 m) deep	ST 94 NE 18	Originally excavated by W.F.Cunnington in 1801. A single burial and a group of three burials were found, but no finds.
Knook 5b (Grinsell)	grid reference ST94804375	Bowl Barrow	No visible remains	ST 94 SW 41	Originally excavated by Richard Colt-Hoare in 1812 and found to contain a crouched inhumation and a possible cremation.
Monument no.211561	grid reference ST94804375	Earthwork		ST 94 SW 42	A roughly rectangular earthwork located on the former junction of two ridge and furrow field systems
Monument no.867365	grid reference ST96334459	Ring ditch	45 to 50 m (148 to 164 ft)	ST 94 SE 35	A large ring ditch to the north east of Knook Castle, possibly the amphitheatre described by Walker in association with the Romano British settlement of Knook Down West.
Monument no.867362	grid reference ST959447	Neolithic flat grave		ST 94 SE 32	Contained a crouched inhumation with a basalt axe.
Monument no.887361	grid reference ST9544	Complex of boundary earthworks		ST 94 SE 37	Numerous ancient features including for banks and ditches.
Castle Barrow	grid reference ST961448	Bowl Barrow	Originally 33 ft (10 m) wide, less than 3 ft (0.91 m) high, surrounded by a ditch 2.5 ft (0.76 m) deep.	ST 94 SE 3	Originally excavated by the Reverend F G Waller around 1937, finds apparently included for the cremated remains of a child within a crushed urn.
Monument no.211324	grid reference ST975429	Iron Age or Romano British field system		ST 94 SE 7	Field systems and strip lynchets on Codford Down.

== See also ==
- List of hillforts in England
