= Ravenhill =

Ravenhill or Raven Hill may refer to:

- Ravenhill, Belfast, Northern Ireland, UK
  - Ravenhill Stadium, a rugby stadium in Belfast
  - Ravenhill Young Men F.C., a football club in Belfast
- Ravenhill, Staffordshire, England, UK
- Ravenhill, Swansea, Wales, UK
- Ravenhill (mansion), the Philadelphia mansion of William Weightman
- Ravenhill (band), an American rock band
- Ravenhill (surname)
- Raven Hill Discovery Center, a museum in Michigan, United States
