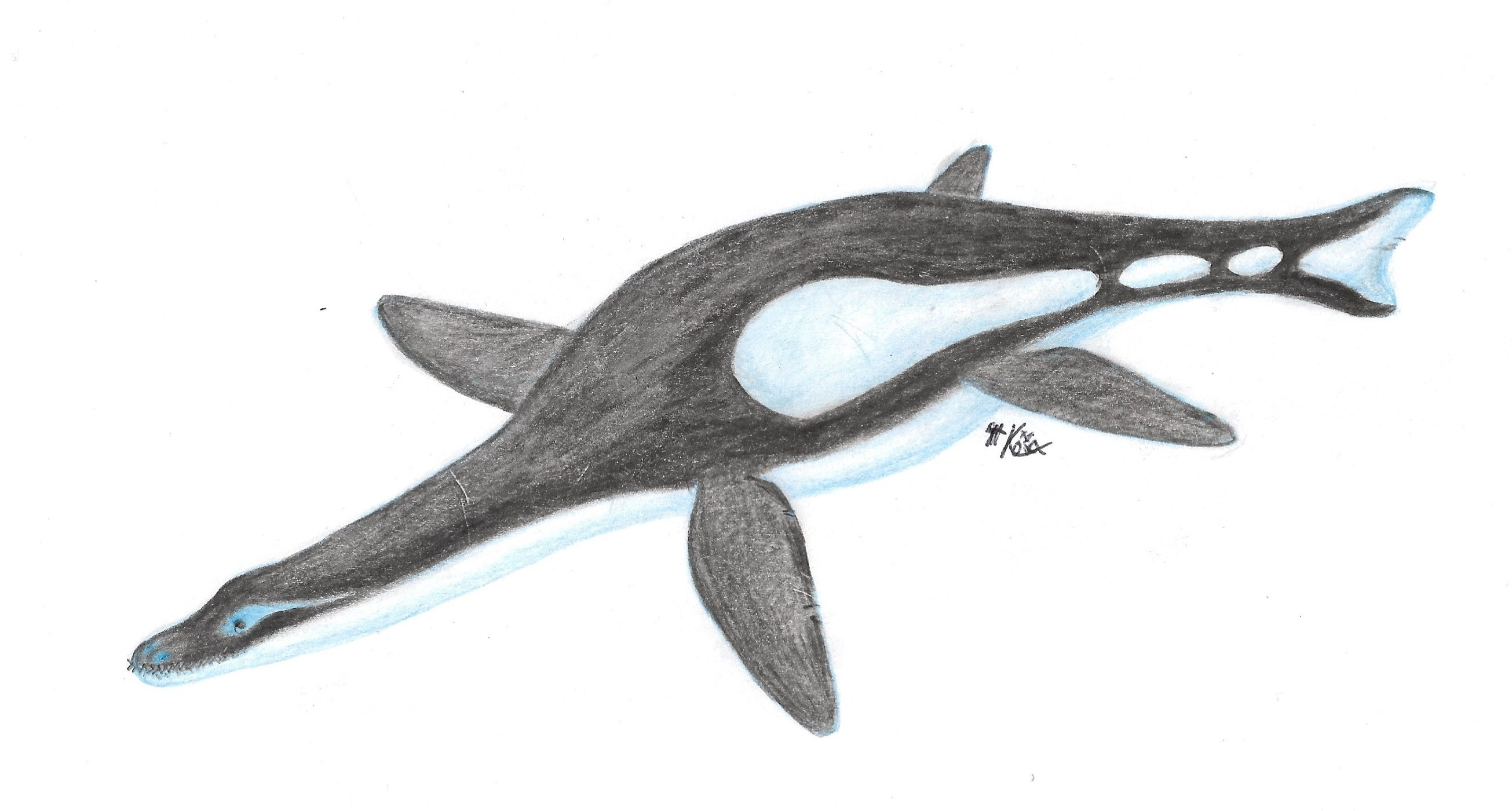
- Restoration of B. swindoniensis as a basal cryptocleidid

Scientific classification
- Kingdom: Animalia
- Phylum: Chordata
- Class: Reptilia
- Superorder: †Sauropterygia
- Order: †Plesiosauria
- Genus: †Bathyspondylus; Delair, 1982
- Species: †B. swindoniensis

Binomial name
- †Bathyspondylus swindoniensis Delair, 1982

= Bathyspondylus =

Bathyspondylus Temporal range: Late Jurassic, Kimmeridgian

Extinct genus of reptiles

Bathyspondylus is an extinct genus of plesiosaur from the Kimmeridge Clay Formation of Swindon, England. Because it is known only from its fossil vertebrae (and so few of those have been recovered), paleontologists are not entirely sure of the taxonomy of Bathyspondylus; the family it belongs to is not currently known. The type, and only known, species is B. swindoniensis, which was described from the same material as its genus.

== Etymology ==
The genus name Bathyspondylus is a compound of two Greek roots: βαθυς (bathys) 'deep' and σπονδυλος (spondylos) 'vertebra'. It can thus be translated as "deep-vertebrae".

The species name B. swindoniensis refers to the town of Swindon in Wiltshire, near which the holotype specimen was discovered.

== Discovery and naming ==
The holotype, DM 1774, which consists of 20 pectoral centra, 23 dorsal centra, 1 caudal centrum, fragmentary neural arches, ribs, ischium, a pubis, complete and broken phalangeals and metacarpals, was discovered in 1774 within the Late Jurassic (Kimmeridgian)-aged Kimmeridge Clay Formation within an outcrop located at the Great Western Railway Works in Swindon, England.

The holotype was at one point in time part of the collection of William Cunnington III sometime before his death in 1810, and it was probably part of the Devizes Museum collection by 1888, where it is now housed.

Bathyspondylus swindonensis was named and described in 1982 by J. B. Delair.

== Description ==
Bathyspondylus had centra set fairly deep in the vertebrae relative to its length, as its name (the Greek words for deep-vertebrae) would suggest. The vertebrae themselves are short antero-posteriorly and can be flat or concave on their terminal faces. The holotype specimen, from 1774, appears to have features of both pliosauroids and plesiosauroids incorporated into its bones.

== Distribution ==
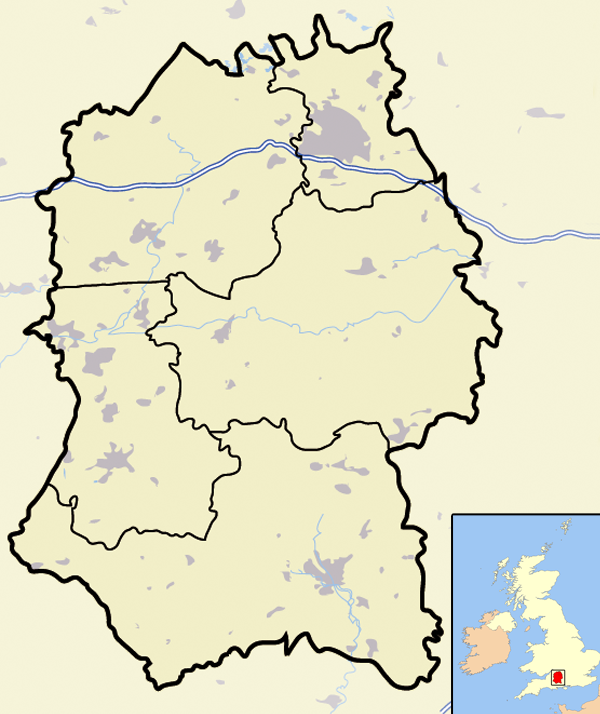
A map of Wiltshire, England. The first Bathyspondylus fossils were discovered near Swindon in the north.

Bathyspondylus lived during the Kimmeridgian faunal stage of the Jurassic period, which occurred roughly 155 to 150 million years ago. The first of its fossils came from deposits near Swindon in Wiltshire, England.

== See also ==
- Timeline of plesiosaur research
- List of plesiosaur genera
