= Antony Barrington Brown =

British photographer (1927–2012)

Antony Barrington Brown FRPS (13 July 1927 – 24 January 2012) was a British designer, photographer, and explorer. He was known to many colleagues as BB.

Barrington Brown was educated at St Edward's School, Oxford, and following National Service in the Royal Tank Regiment went up to Gonville and Caius College, Cambridge, to read Natural Sciences. At Cambridge he was picture editor of the student newspaper Varsity. His photograph of Watson and Crick, taken in 1953 soon after they had discovered the structure of DNA, later became the iconic image of the pair. In 1955–56 Barrington Brown was part of the Oxford and Cambridge Far Eastern Expedition, a 32,000-mile trip overland from Hyde Park Corner to Singapore, and back. The trip was recorded in the book First Overland: London-Singapore by Land Rover by Tim Slessor.

In the mid-1950s he worked at Dexion and designed a successful storage system called Speedframe. A member of the Royal Photographic Society from 1951, he became a Fellow in 2003.

Barrington Brown and his wife, the sculptor Althea Wynne, were killed in a car crash near their home at Upton Lovell, Wiltshire in January 2012.
