= Olympia Art & Antiques Fairs =

The Olympia Art & Antiques Fairs (founded 1973) are events held at Olympia Exhibition Centre in London, organised by Clarion Events Ltd. From 1973 to 1990 the fairs were only summer events but since 1991 they have been held in both summer (June) and winter (November).

== History ==
=== The Art and Antiques Fair Olympia ===
The first Olympia Art & Antiques Fair was held at Earls Court in 1973 and moved to Olympia in 1979. Now running for over 40 years, this fair has held its position as the largest most well-established vetted fine art and antiques fair in London. The fair runs over 11 days in June and attracts around 32,000 visitors each year.

At the first fair in 1973, dealers were divided into Gold, Silver and Bronze sections according to quality and dateline of stock.

In 2010, dateline restrictions were removed allowing dealers to exhibit contemporary pieces for the first time.

In 2012, over 200 art and antiques dealers exhibited including 70 furniture specialists, 18 from overseas, 40 new dealers and 30 who returned after a break.

Covering over 34 disciplines, items for sale include 20th-century design, contemporary, 18th and 19th century English furniture, Old Masters, modern British art, tribal art, Asian works of art, ceramics, carpets, art deco, silver and jewellery, antique reclamation and more.

=== Winter Olympia Art and Antiques Fair ===
The first Winter Fair took place in 1991. The Winter Fair runs in association with the two largest trade associations for antique dealers in Britain, the British Antique Dealers’ Association (BADA) and The Association of Art and Antique Dealers (LAPADA).

The fair runs over 7 days in November and attracts around 24,000 visitors each year.

Victoria Borwick, currently the Deputy Mayor of London organised the Olympia Art and Antiques Fairs as Director from 1990 until 2001.
