= Woolstore Theatre =

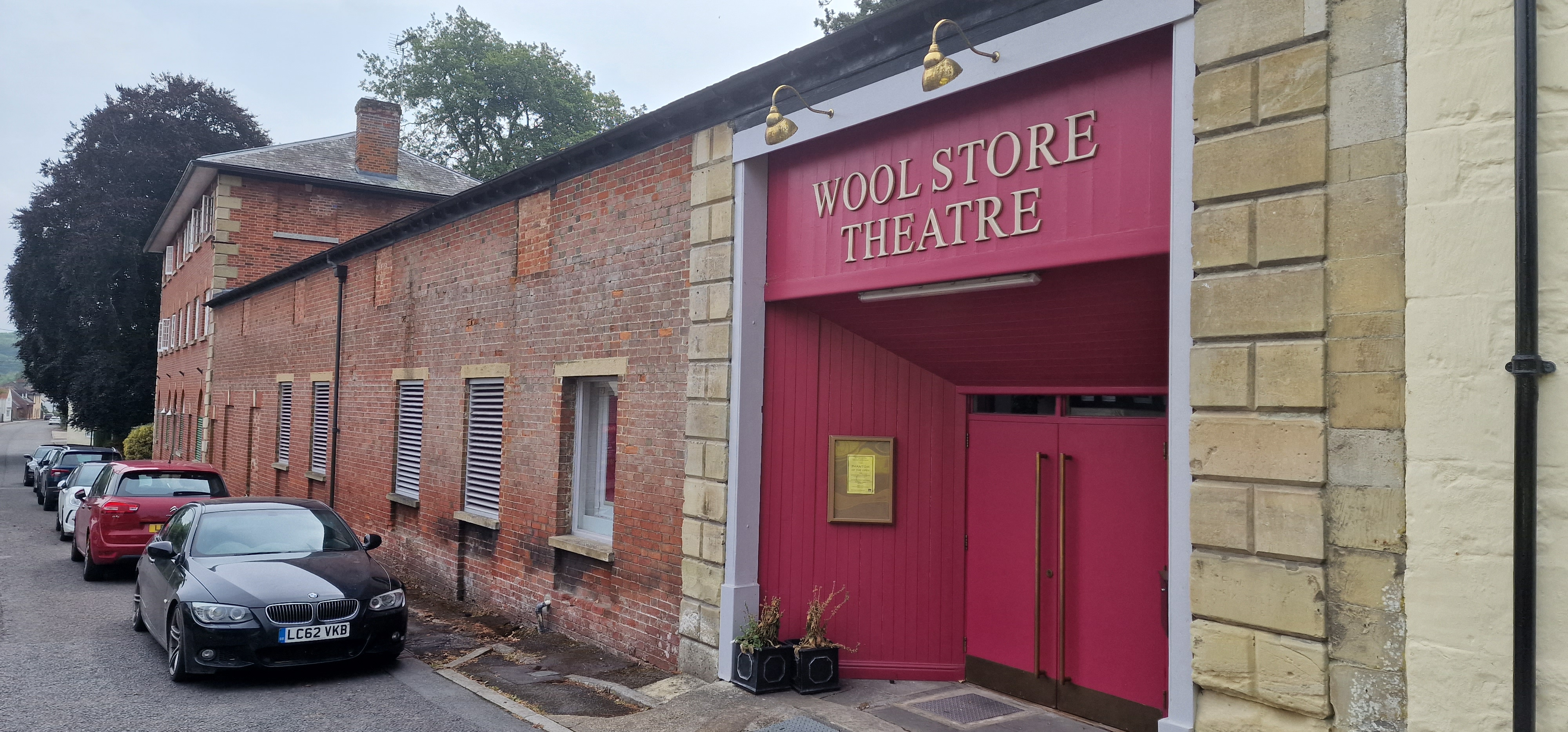
- The outside of the theatre in 2022
- Interactive map of Woolstore Theatre
- Address: Codford; United Kingdom
- Coordinates: 51.1579589°N 2.04734272°W
- Capacity: 107

Construction
- Opened: 1928

Website
- www.thewoolstoretheatre.org.uk

The Woolstore Theatre is a theatre in the village of Codford, Wiltshire, England. The theatre has been operating since 1928, when it was built by Colonel Ralph Sneyd for his wife who enjoyed acting.

== Cinema ==
The old wool store was converted into a cinema around 1906, and named the Codford Empire Cinema. It provided entertainment to Australian troops during the First World War.

After the war, the cinema was turned into use as the village hall.

== Theatre foundation ==
Colonel Ralph Sneyd was from a distinguished family, with a family seat of Keele Hall, Staffordshire (now Keele University), but following the death of his first wife, he was involved in a public scandal whilst attempting to divorce his second wife Irene Alexander on the grounds of adultery, which was widely reported in the press.

Sneyd bought a large property in Codford, which included ownership of the Woolstore. When he took a third wife, Dorothy Miller, known as Stella, who enjoyed acting, he converted it to a theatre. Stella formed a group called the Codford Amateurs, and their first play was performed at the Woolstore Theatre in 1928.

By 1938, the company had grown and came fourth out of more than 200 entries in a national contest.

The company shared some performers with other local groups such as the Warminster Operatic Society.

The theatre was taken over by the military during the Second World War, and resumed in 1948. Colonel Sneyd died in 1949 and his wife moved away from the area, but the theatre company continued to use the venue until 1955.

== Community theatre ==
A separate organisation, the Woolstore County Theatre Club was started in Codford in the early 1950s, for people to learn about theatre, and in 1964, this merged with the Codford Amateurs, with the chairman of the Amateurs group purchasing the theatre, which was then transferred to benefactors to be held for the benefit of the theatre club.

== Honours ==
In the 2000 New Year Honours, Karen Johnstone was awarded an MBE for services to the community, particularly the Woolstore Theatre.
