= Althea Wynne =

English sculptor and art teacher

Althea Wynne FRBS
- Born: Althea Kathleen Wynne; 6 October 1936; Biggleswade, Bedfordshire
- Died: 24 January 2012 (aged 75); Upton Lovell, Wiltshire
- Education: Royal College of Art, London
- Known for: sculpture
- Notable work: Public art, 1950s – 2010s
- Awards: FRBS

Althea Kathleen Wynne (6 October 1936 – 24 January 2012), also known by her married names of Dresman and Barrington Brown, was an English sculptor and art teacher, and a Fellow of the Royal British Society of Sculptors. She specialized in creating large figurative work for gardens and public open spaces.

== Early life ==
Born at Biggleswade, Wynne was the daughter of Group Captain Frederick Robert Wynne by his marriage in 1926 to Kathleen Anne Pole Stuart, and had an older brother and sister. Her grandparents were Dr and Mrs F. E. Wynne, of Sheffield, and Lieutenant Colonel and Mrs Reginald Pole Stuart, of Folkestone. Her Stuart grandfather was the grandson of Sir William Stuart (1798–1874), himself the son of William Stuart, Archbishop of Armagh, and grandson of John Stuart, 3rd Earl of Bute, sometime Prime Minister, and his grandmother was Henrietta Maria Sarah, a daughter of Admiral of the Fleet Sir Charles Morice Pole, Governor of the Bank of England.

At the time of Wynne's birth, her father was an officer in the Royal Air Force, and Wynne was educated at North Foreland Lodge, Farnham School of Art (1953–1955), Hammersmith College (1955–1957), and the Royal College of Art (1957–1960).

== Life and career ==
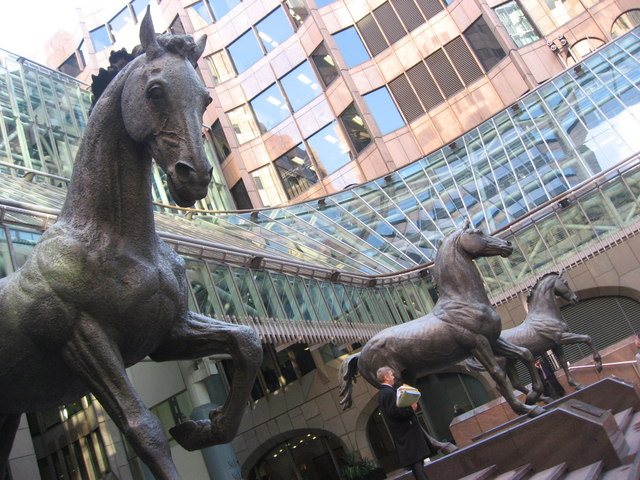
Group of three horses at Minster Court, City of London

In 1959 Wynne gained an early commission from London County Council for a ciment-fondu group of swimmers, and in 1960 she won an open competition to design a new silver horse-racing trophy. However, the same year she married Philip Dresman, and with him had a son and two daughters. For some years she spent most of her time bringing up her children, before returning to work as a teacher of art and the history of art. In 1982 she married secondly Antony Barrington Brown, a photographer, and at about the same time became active as a sculptor again.

Wynne settled at Upton Lovell in Wiltshire, where several pieces of her work were displayed in her garden. In Who's Who in Art her recreations were stated as "riding, sailing, talking".

She died suddenly in January 2012, killed with her husband in a road accident on the A36 near her home while returning from the foundry that was to cast her last commission, two large bronzes of Windsor Grey horses for Windsor Great Park. Both Wynne and Barrington Brown were killed instantly in a collision between their car and a truck carrying aggregates. In February it was reported that there were plans to proceed with the Windsor project, finding another sculptor to complete the work by June 2013.

== Work ==
As a sculptor, Wynne's chief inspirations were the natural environment and classical (especially Etruscan) art. Most of her work was figurative, showing various forms of animal and female human figures. In 1988 her fountain Doves Rising was added to the Peace Park in Hounslow. A lifelong rider, she made a number of equine statues, and in 1989 Prudential Property gave her a commission for three bronze horses to stand by the steps at Minster Court in the City of London. Since nicknamed Sterling, Dollar and Yen, the group is ten feet high, weighs fourteen tonnes, and has been compared with the horses of St Mark's Basilica in Venice. In 1991 her Family of Goats, for the London Docklands Development Corporation, was erected at Rotherhithe. Other work includes a group called White Horses, at the centre of a restaurant on Queen Elizabeth 2, which shows four horses riding the waves, "Europa and the Bull", a full-size bronze figure, and the three huge obelisks rising through the Bluewater shopping centre at Greenhithe in Kent. She held solo exhibitions in Salisbury in 1988 and 1991, at Broadgate in 1993, and in Winchester in 1997. In 2012 her bronze Penelope Waiting was the signature piece for an exhibition of sculpture at Avebury Manor.

Wynne wrote of the inspirations for her work:

My work is deeply influenced by my love of early classical sculpture, the calm poise and harmony of which I try to emulate. The Greeks also had an understanding of animals from which I draw some of my inspiration, and my equestrian subjects owe much to my love of riding.

== Professional associations ==
- 1960: Associate of the Royal College of Art
- 1986: Full member of the Society of Equestrian Artists
- 1990: Associate of the Royal British Society of Sculptors
- 1994: Fellow of the Royal British Society of Sculptors

== See also ==
- List of public art in the City of London
