= Codford Circle =

Neolithic hilltop enclosure in Wiltshire, England

Coordinates: 51.1643°N 2.0263°W

- Oldbury Camp, Wilsbury Ring, Woldsbury
- Location within Wiltshire
- Type: Hilltop enclosure or possible hillfort
- Periods: Possible Neolithic
- Location: Wiltshire
- Region: Southern England

Site notes
- Material: Chalk
- Height: 188 m (617 ft)
- Area: 3.6 ha (8.9 acres)
- Archaeologists: Sir Richard Colt Hoare, W.F. Cunnington

Codford Circle, also known as Wilsbury Ring, Woldsbury, and possibly Oldbury Camp, is a Neolithic hill top enclosure or possible hillfort located on the summit of Codford Hill, a chalk promontory of Salisbury Plain, near to the village and civil parish of Codford, in Wiltshire, England.

The site is oval in plan and approximately of 3.6 ha (8.9 acres). It is surrounded by a bank 6.5 m (21 ft) wide and up to 1.6 m (5.2 ft) high, then a ditch 5 m (16 ft) wide and up to 0.5 m (1.6 ft) deep, although an area on the south eastern edge has been reduced by ploughing. Aerial photography shows signs of an inner ditch, possibly signs of a former palisade fence, and entrances on the east and west sides. The entrances on the southeast and northwest sides are later in date.

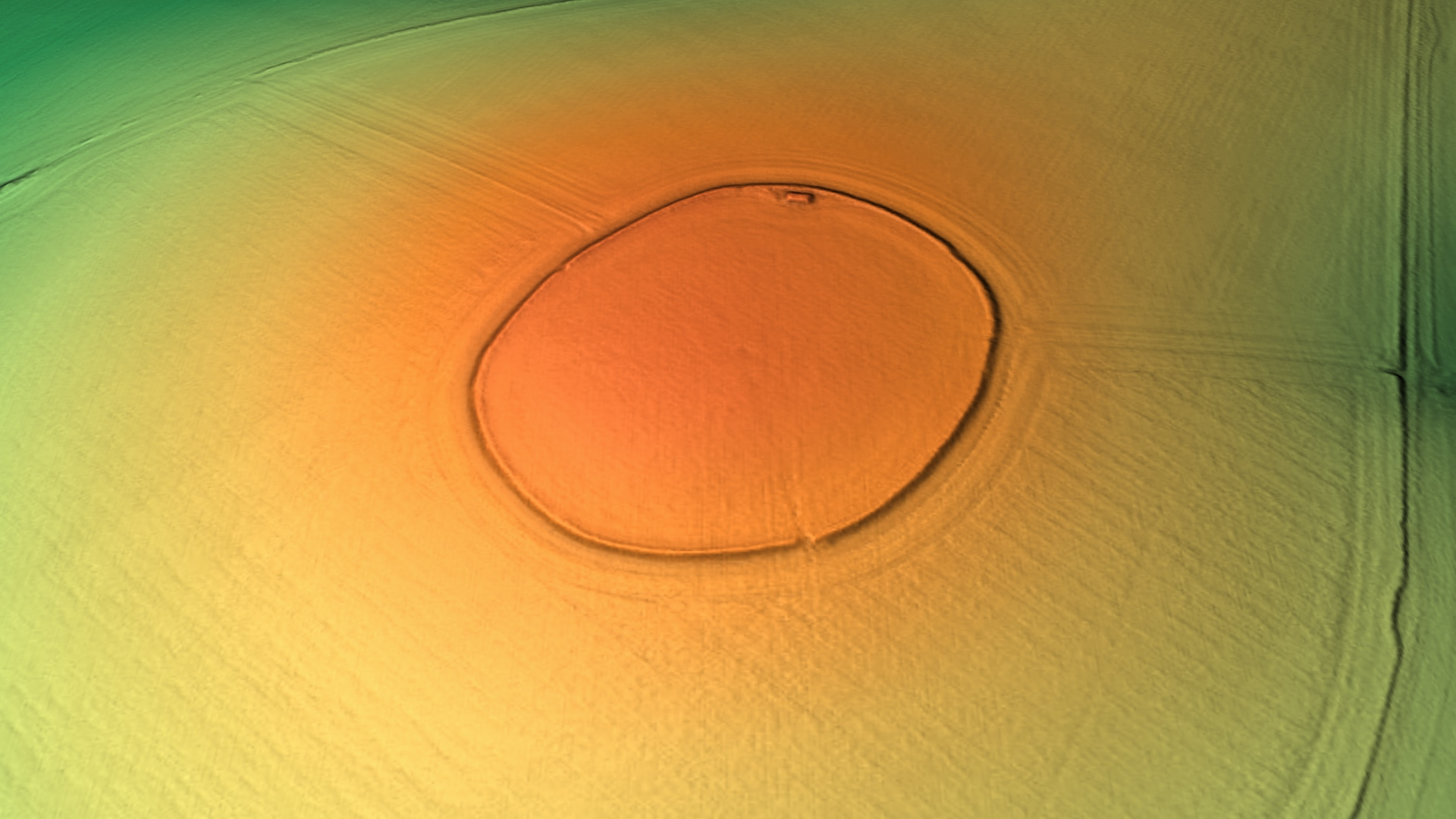
3D view of the digital terrain model

There is no archaeological evidence for occupation, and the earthworks have been interpreted as being defensively weak owing to their slight nature, therefore the site is interpreted as an enclosure of an unknown but ancient date.

== See also ==
- List of hill forts in England
