= Ravenhill (surname) =

Ravenhill is a surname, and may refer to:

- Alice Ravenhill, Canadian educational pioneer
- George Ravenhill, English soldier who received the Victoria Cross
- Leonard Ravenhill, British revivalist and teacher at Last Days Ministries
- Mark Ravenhill, English playwright
- Philip Ravenhill (1828–1891), British Royal Engineer
- Ricky Ravenhill, English professional footballer
- Leonard Raven-Hill, cartoonist
