= Ashton Gifford House =

Country house in Wiltshire, England

Coordinates: 51.1593°N 2.0575°W

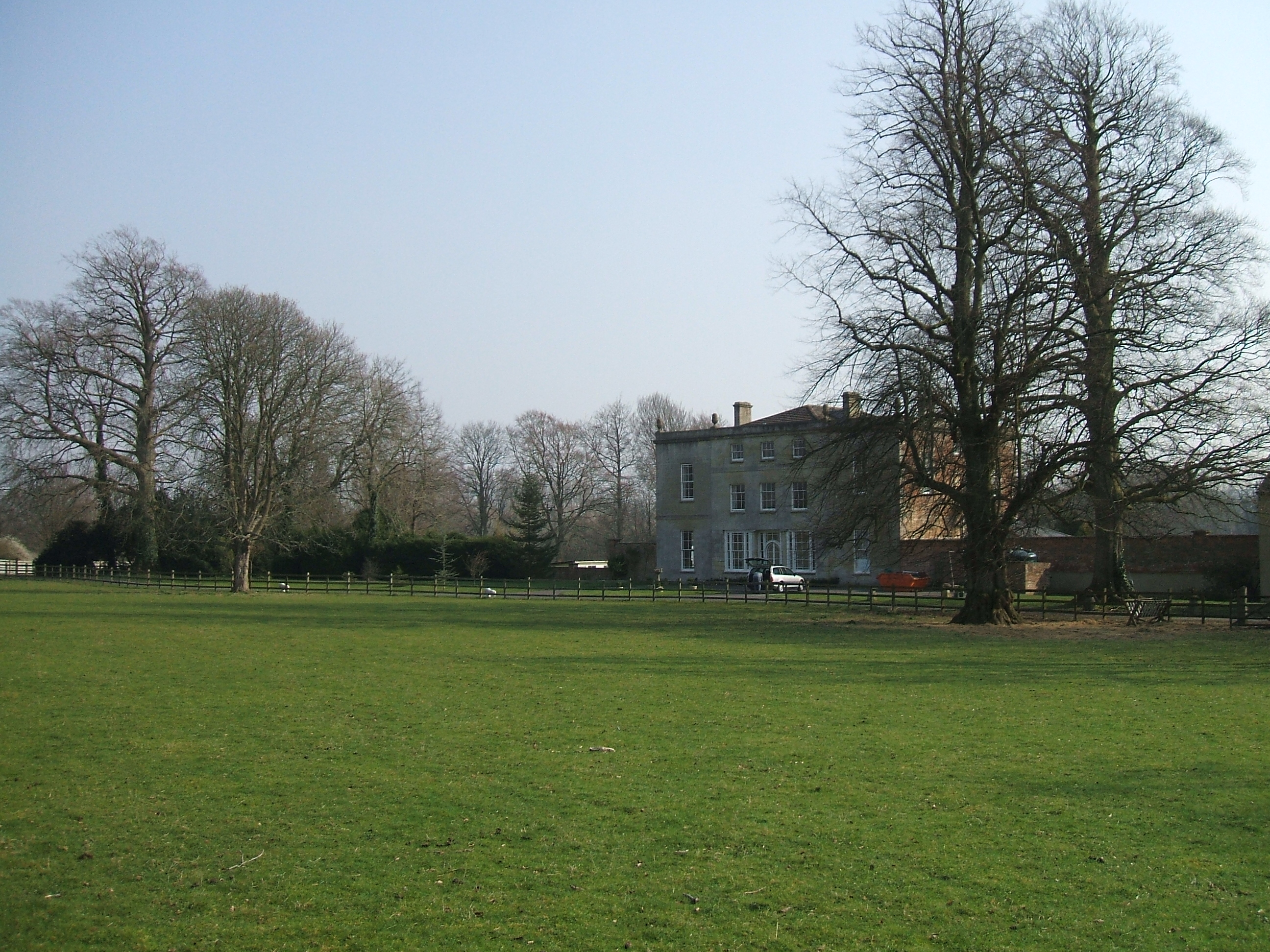
Ashton Gifford House, north elevation

Ashton Gifford House is a Grade II listed country house in the hamlet of Ashton Gifford, part of the civil parish of Codford in the English county of Wiltshire. Ashton Gifford House is mentioned in the Wiltshire edition of the Pevsner Architectural Guides. The house was built during the early 19th century, following the precepts of Georgian architecture, and its estate eventually included all of the hamlet or tithing of Ashton Gifford. The house sits in the Wylye valley, part of the Cranborne Chase Area of Outstanding Natural Beauty. The central part of the house was built around 1806 by Benjamin Rebbeck, with wings added by William Hubbard after 1815.

== Early history ==
Ashton Gifford is recorded in the 1086 Domesday Book, listed as land belonging to Humphrey de l'Isle. The land was held by Robert, previously (under King Edward) having been held by Cynewig. Ashton Gifford was a relatively prosperous estate, valued at six pounds (from four pounds in 1066). The estate consisted of 12 acres (49,000 m^{2}) of meadow, and pasture "6 furlongs long and as much broad".

The site of the Anglo Saxon settlement can be seen in the field to the south of the current Ashton Gifford House, where different patches of colour in the earth indicate the sites of Anglo Saxon houses.

There is reference to the manor being known as Ashton Dunstanville in the late 14th century.

The 1773 version of Andrews' and Dury's map of Wiltshire refers to Ashton Gifford as "Isherton". The map shows around eleven houses forming the tything or hamlet of Ashton Gifford.

== Enclosure ==
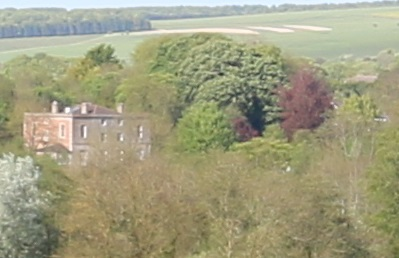
Ashton Gifford House, seen from the Codford Ridge to the south

In September 1811 the following notice was published in local newspapers: "Notice is hereby given, That Application is intended to be made to Parliament, in the next Session of Parliament, for leave to bring in a Bill for dividing and allotting in severalty the Open and Common Fields and Downs, Common Meadows, Common Pastures, Commonable and Waste Lands, in or belonging to the Tything of Ashton Gifford, in the parish of Codford Saint Peter, in the county of Wilts."

An Act of Enclosure was passed for the "Tything of Ashton Gifford, in the Parish of Codford Saint Peter" on 27 May 1814. This allowed for the enclosure of lands in the hamlet, naming William Hubbard Esq., William Hinton Esq., and Sarah Bingham, Spinster as the owners under the Lord of the manor of Codford St Peter (Harry Biggs Esq.). Three "gentlemen" were appointed Commissioners for the enclosure: John Hayward of Rowde, John Rogers of Burcombe and Ambrose Patient of Corton. The Commissioners were instructed to meet at "a certain House called the George Inn in Codford Saint Peter aforesaid". The George still exists, as the George Hotel, in Codford High Street, though it was rebuilt in the later 19th century.

== Construction ==
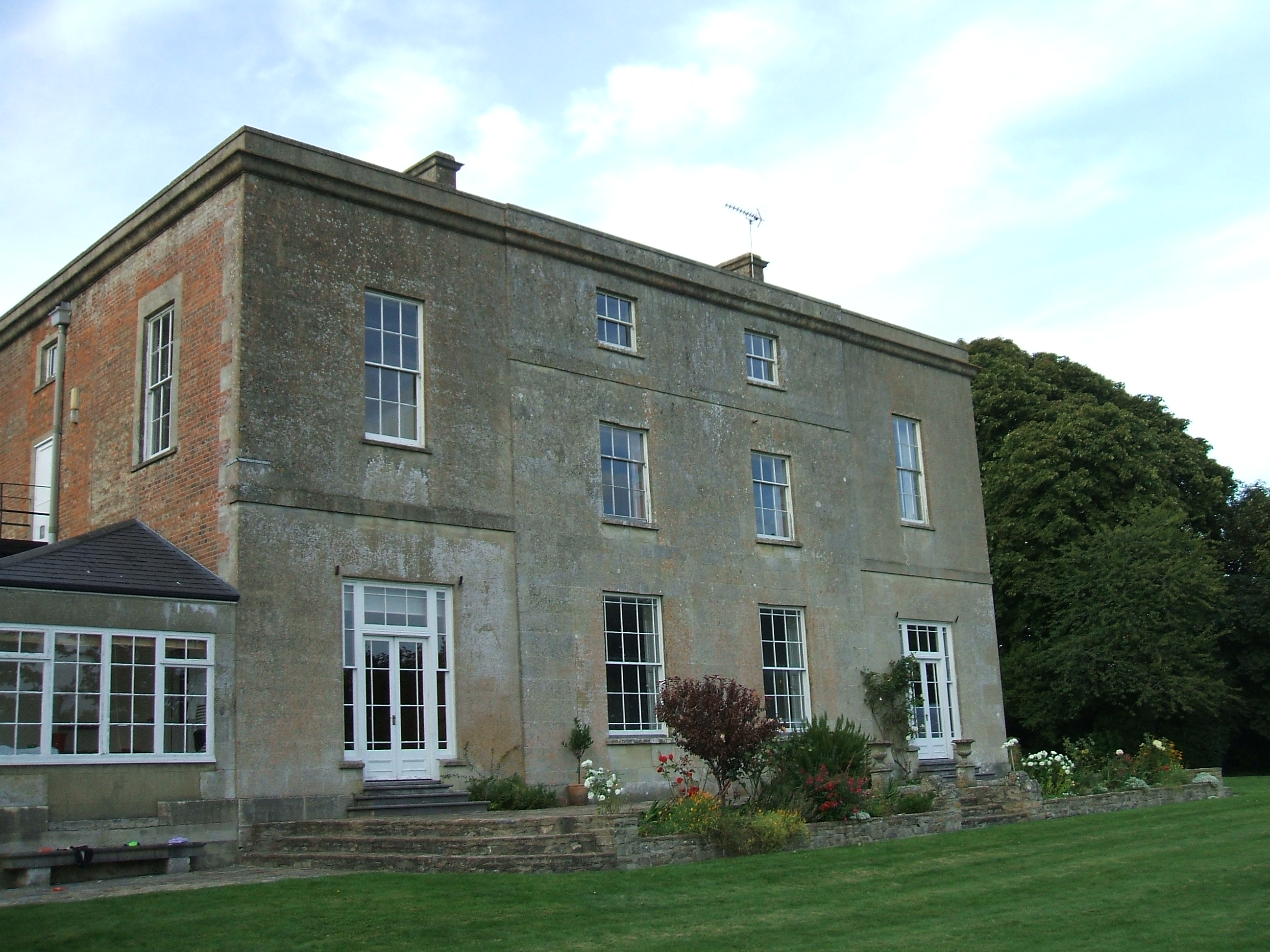
Ashton Gifford House, south facade, showing the central portion with three stories, and the east and west wings

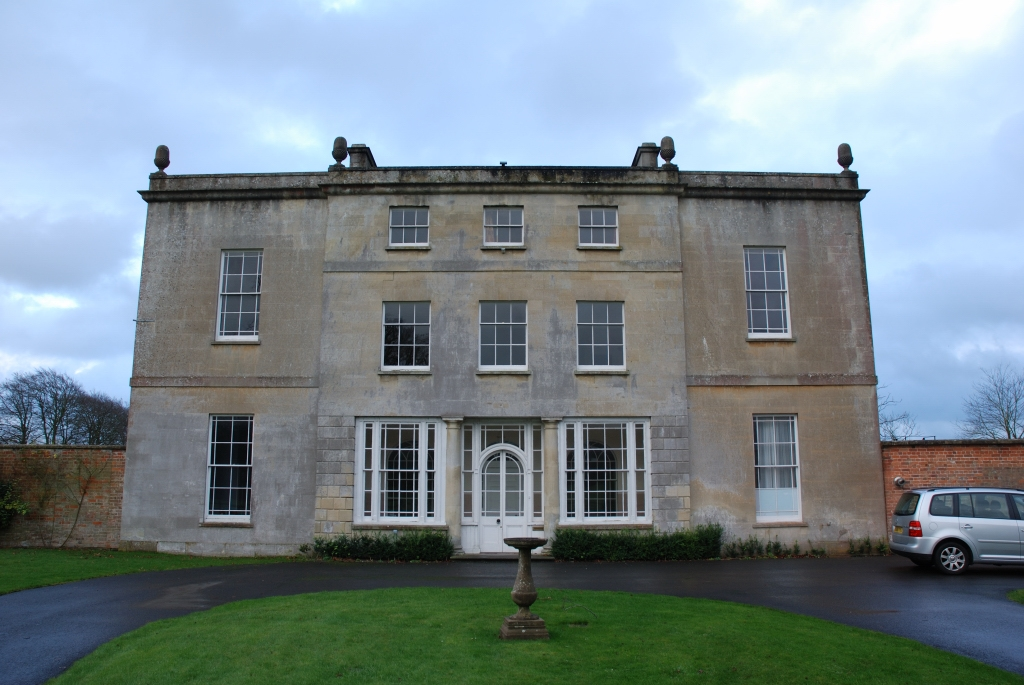
Ashton Gifford House, north facade, showing the original central block of three stories, and the east and west ashlar wings

The main house appears to have been built in two principal stages. The central part, of three storeys, has thick walls which were constructed as external walls and which now lie in between the central portion and the east and west wings of the property. It is surmised that this part of the property was constructed around 1806 by Benjamin Rebbeck, a local landowner who had purchased the property (including around 93 acres (38 ha) of land) from the estate of the Earl of Shrewsbury. Rebbeck was a churchwarden and parish overseer of the poor in Codford St Peter. Rebbeck lost the house to the mortgage holder in 1815 as a result of his spiralling debts, for which he was imprisoned in 1818 in Fleet Prison, and the mortgage holder, William Hubbard, who is mentioned in the enclosure of Ashton Gifford, took possession of the house and added the two ashlar wings. Hubbard appears to have been resident by May 1817 (at the latest). Hubbard also increased the size of the estate, to around 307 acres (124 ha).

The walled garden, which appears to have been constructed around this time, and which is still a part of the property, lies to the west of the current house. It has been described as the largest in the county, at 1.3 acres (0.53 ha). It was in use as a vegetable garden into the 1980s, when the house was occupied by a school (see below).

In the 19th century, significant modifications to the property were undertaken. The owners added a service wing to the western side of the house, running from the original Georgian structure towards the walled garden, providing kitchens for the house (two in number), two dairies, pantries and store rooms, and servants' accommodation. This wing was damaged by fire in the 1950s, and demolished in the early 1970s. The westernmost portion of the wing remains, and is now in use as garages.

== Architecture ==
English Heritage, in their Images of England section describe the property as having a limestone ashlar front with side walls of brick. The property is three-storied, with a three-window central block breaking forward and two-storey same-height side-bays. The main entrance is a distyle in antis Tuscan portico to the centre with inserted double half-glazed doors and flanking tripartite sashes, an inner main door with six fielded panels, fanlights and flanking margin-pane round-arched sashes with interlaced glazing bars. The ground floor of the centre block has rusticated stonework. The first floor has three nine-pane sashes, and the second floor has a plat band and three six-pane sashes. The two-storey side-bays have eight-pane margin sashes and a plat band. At roof level there is a moulded cornice to the plain stone parapet, with 20th-century pineapple decorations.

At the rear of the property there are two central bays which break forward with 12-pane sashes to ground floor, nine-pane to first and six-pane sashes to second floor, while the side-bays have eight-pane margin sashes to ground and first floors. The interior features of the property that are highlighted by English Heritage include the central entrance hall with an oval open-well staircase (which has a continuous handrail and cast-iron balusters). Also noted are the presence of period doors, of six-panelled design, in panelled reveals and moulded architraves, and the period window shutters. On the ground floor, the drawing room has a scrolled plaster ceiling margin and a fireplace, which are singled out for special mention.

The house is mentioned in Pevsner's Wiltshire edition, referencing the staircase and Tuscan columns to the porch.

== Nineteenth century ==
After Benjamin Rebbeck lost the house, the mortgage holder William Hubbard completed the building of Ashton Gifford House (also known as Ashton House) sometime between 1815 and 1824, had occupied it by 1817 and remained in residence until his death in 1831. One Henry Hubbard is recorded as having obtained a game licence at Ashton Gifford in 1817 and in 1825. William Hubbard married three times. First, to Margaret Wilkinson in St.Petersburg, by whom he had three children: Henry, Jane, and William. Second, to Grace Powditch in London, by whom he had three further children: Grace, Susannah and Elizabeth. Third, to Jane Turner Ingram, with whom he lived at Ashton Gifford; there were no children from this marriage. William's brother was John Hubbard, of Forest House, Leyton. Around 10 of the old village houses were still standing in 1817, but these had been removed by 1839. The only original village building to be retained was a 17th-century cottage, which became the western (or Station) lodge house, now known as Ashton Cottage.

After Hubbard died in 1831, the trustees of his estate sold the property in 1834 to James Raxworthy. The house was then sold to Wadham Locke in 1836, who at the time of the 1841 census was living at Ashton Gifford House with his wife Caroline and daughter Charlotte. The estate at this stage amounted to some 364 acres (147 ha). In 1844 Locke married for a second time (Caroline having died in 1842). His new wife, Albinia, was the daughter of the landowner John Dalton (of Keningford Hall, Yorkshire and Fillingham Castle, Lincolnshire).

Locke was formerly an officer in the first Dragoon Guards, and went on to become High Sheriff of Wiltshire in 1847 (he was occasionally described as being of "Ashton Giffard", the alternative spelling of the locale). He was a huntsman, purchasing a "famed" pack of foxhounds known as the Headington Harriers for "two seasons" from a Mr Jem Morrell, before selling them to Sir John Cam Hobhouse (later Lord Broughton). An account of hare coursing on the Ashton Gifford estate is given in the Sporting Review of 1840. Locke's father, also Wadham Locke (of Rowdeford House), had been High Sheriff in 1804 and was Member of Parliament for Devizes in 1832; he was the senior partner in the banking company of Locke, Hughes and Co of Devizes. Wadham Locke II's youngest sister (Wadham Locke I's youngest daughter) became Frances Isabella Duberly, who achieved notoriety for her presence with the army at the front line of the Crimean War. After her mother's death in 1838, she lived with her brother at Ashton Gifford, until her marriage in 1845. Locke apparently collected stuffed birds, amassing almost a thousand British and foreign specimens kept in glass cases.

Wadham Locke paid for the construction of the village school at Codford St Peter, and subsequently supported it financially.

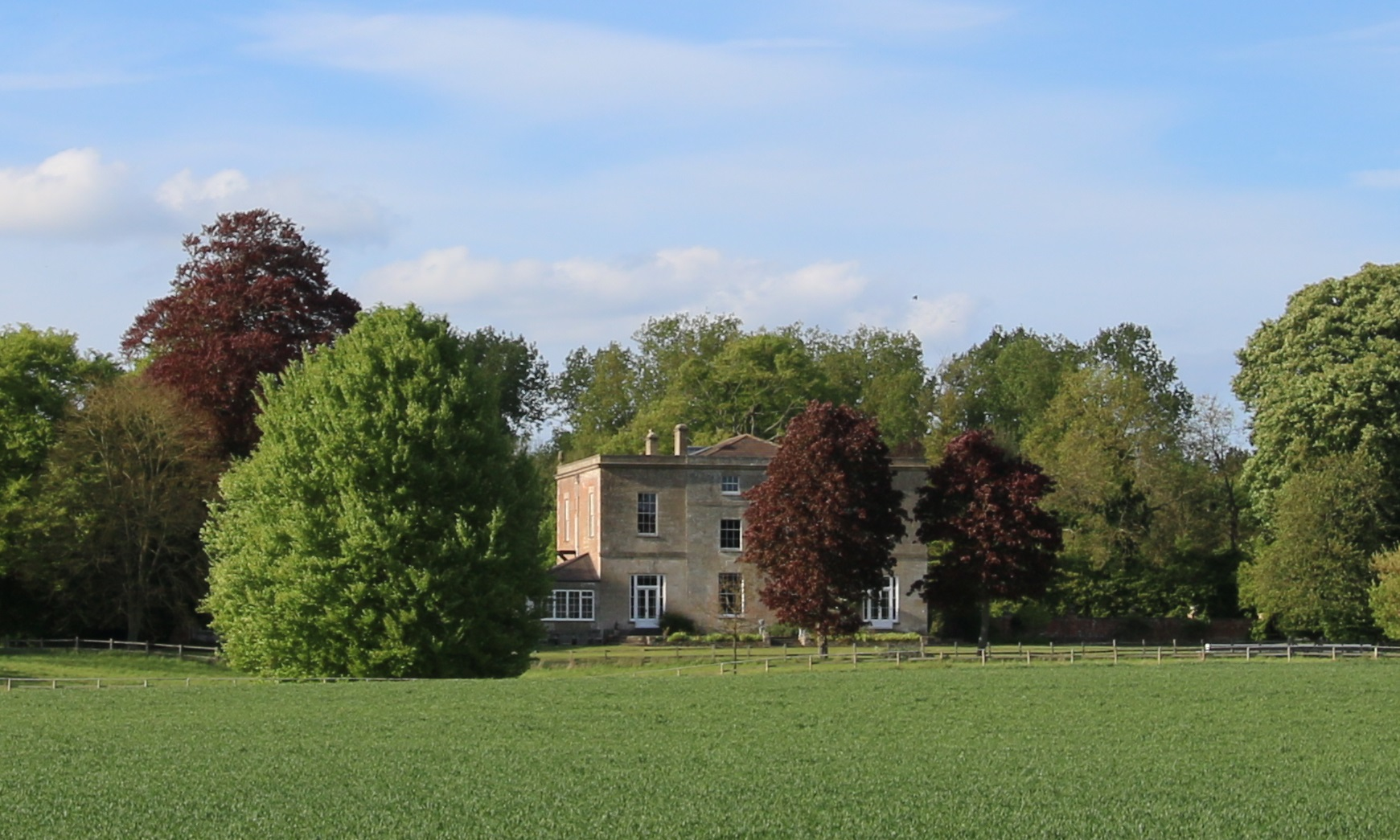
Ashton Gifford House from the south

The Ravenhill family occupied Ashton Gifford House (sometimes known as Ashton House at this time) from 1850 until the 1870s. John Ravenhill was a banker, the Chairman of the North Wiltshire Banking Company. As a Warminster magistrate he had read the Riot Act at Hindon during the riots of 1830 (this was before he took possession of Ashton Gifford). He served as the first Chairman of the Warminster Board of Guardians and was commissioned as a Lieutenant in the 10th company, Wiltshire Volunteer Rifle Corps at the end of May 1860. He was also a member of the Wiltshire Archaeological and Natural History Society. John Ravenhill was Deputy Lieutenant of Wiltshire, and (in 1870) High Sheriff of Wiltshire. Ravenhill became friends with his neighbour Prince Leopold and Prince Leopold's wife, the Duchess of Albany. The Duchess helped John Ravenhill's granddaughter Alice Ravenhill in her career.

John Ravenhill's eldest son, John Richard Ravenhill (1824–1894) was an engineer in the firm of Miller, Ravenhill and Co (Richard Ravenhill, brother of John Ravenhill of Ashton Gifford, was a founding partner). The second son became Major General Philip Ravenhill who was the Commanding Royal Engineer in Gibraltar. The third son was the Reverend Canon Henry Everett Ravenhill (died 1913). The fifth son, William Waldon Ravenhill, was a lawyer (called to the bar in April 1862). The family were actively involved in the Codford St Peter School, with John Ravenhill providing much of the funding. An annual school fete took place, at which students from the "Sunday, National, and Night" schools were entertained (on the lawn, not in the house) and provided with tea and cake. John Ravenhill died in 1878, apparently having moved out of the house to London some time before his death. The house was offered for sale by Messrs Waters, Son, and Rawlence in June 1877. The advertisement described "74 acres of rich pasture, sound arable, and productive orchards, plantations, and woods, together with the substantially built and well arranged mansion and offices, capital stabling and coach houses, recently erected, entrance lodges, cottage, dog kennels, etc." The local foxhunts were cited as a selling feature of the house, as was the fishing: "The river Wylye runs through the estate, in which there is excellent and exclusive trout fishing, and a permanent spring of water rises in the park, which is well adapted for breeding trout. The residence is placed in the centre of a beautifully timbered park, and is approached form either side by a carriage drive through entrance lodges. The kitchen gardens are walled-in and unusually productive, and well planted with fruit trees in full bearing."

The house was then bought by George Clement, a race horse trainer, who lived there along with his family. Clement had achieved the notable success of the "autumn double" in 1876, when his horse "Rosebery" won the Cambridgeshire and Cesarewitch Handicaps (the first of only three occasions when this has happened).

By 1882 the house was sold by to Thomas King Harding, a farmer, who occupied the house until his death in 1916. The establishment was somewhat reduced under Harding. While the Ravenhills had run the house with six indoor servants (in addition to the gardening, coach and farm staff), Harding had only three servants in the house.

In 1886 the head gardener at Ashton Gifford, William Henry Line, was charged with unlawfully destroying plants in the walled garden, and fined five pounds on being found guilty by the Warminster police court presided over by the Marquis of Bath. A newspaper article of the trial gives a sense of the productivity of the walled garden: "Unripe cucumbers had been cut, the onion bed had been knocked about, fruit had been knocked off the trees and the trees pulled from the wall, strawberry plants pulled up and chrysanthemum plants in pots destroyed". The trial described the garden as having a wall of seven or eight feet in height, enclosing roughly an acre, with three locked gates into the garden. The wall was (and still is) capped with stone. The prosecution noted that the moss covering the stone had not been disturbed, in arguing that no one had scaled the wall from outside. Alongside the chrysanthemums (fifty six in number), strawberry plants (fifty) and damaged fruit trees (fifteen plum and one pear), the trial mentioned vines (with Harding unhappy about the way Line had maintained them), potatoes, celery, and onions. Line was convicted on the basis of the footprints in the garden, which matched his boots.

In 1908 the Australian publication The Pastoralists' Review included an article about Harding and Ashton Gifford House. The correspondent reported:

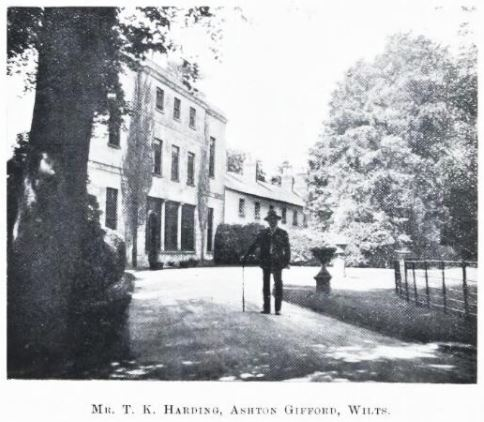
T.K. Harding in front of the northern facade of Ashton Gifford House, from The Pastoralist's Review of 15 August 1908

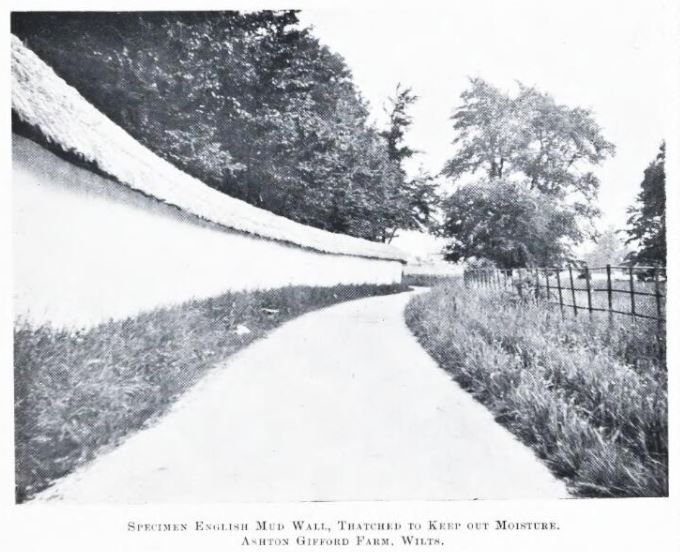
Traditional thatched wall, and estate fencing on the Ashton Gifford estate: Sherrington Lane looking north towards the village of Codford, from The Pastoralists' Review of 15 August 1908

At Ashton Gifford House, Mr. Harding’s home, one could hear the chimes or bells of eight churches, all within a radius of five miles. My host [Harding] is one of the best-known men in Wiltshire. He is eighty-three years of age and still hunts twice a week in the season. He farms 900 acres and keeps some very beautiful Devon cattle round the house, his deer he calls them. The river Wylye runs through his property. This, with numerous springs, gives a fine supply of water in all directions, good fishing can be had in any creek on the place. The copper beeches and other trees make it a most lovely spot.

The same publication reported on Harding's birthday and a meeting of the local foxhunt at Ashton Gifford, two years later:

A glorious and typical morning signalised the meet of the South and West Wilts Foxhounds at Ashton Gifford House last December, where they went at the invitation of Mr. T. K. Harding, and in honour of that esteemed gentleman's celebration of his eighty-sixth birthday. The ground was crisp in the grip of early winter, and the sun shone brightly as the various ladies and gentlemen taking part in the proceedings arrived in the picturesque grounds surrounding Mr. Harding's residence.

== Railway ==
In 1836, along with several other local landowners, the owner of Ashton Gifford House, Wadham Locke, opposed the construction of a railway from Salisbury to Warminster, which would have cut across the estate. A meeting of the landowners took place: "It was resolved, that the proposed Railroad from Salisbury to Warminster appeared to be wholly uncalled for by the Traffic of either of those places, or of the intermediate district, and that such an undertaking would prove seriously detrimental to the Agricultural Interests of the neighbourhood..." In the face of opposition from the landowners, the London, Exeter, and Falmouth Railway withdrew their plans in June 1836.

In 1844, the Wilts, Somerset and Weymouth Railway gave notice of an intention to obtain an Act of Parliament to construct a railway running through Ashton Gifford. The line linking Salisbury and Warminster was built through the estate to the south of Ashton Gifford House, opening on 30 June 1856. Codford station, close to the West Lodge (also known as Thatched Lodge or Station Lodge) provided rapid transport links for the Ashton Gifford Estate.

== Sale of 1920 ==
T.K. Harding died in 1916, leaving an estate valued at £96,032. The house was acquired by Captain Fane.

The "Ashton Gifford Estate" was put up for sale by auction in 1920, on the "order of Captain H. N. Fane". Rawlence and Squarey were the auctioneers, and the auction took place at the White Hart Hotel, Salisbury on 1 June. Fane had purchased the property on the death of Harding in 1916. The house was described at this time as having sixteen bedrooms and dressing rooms and "the usual offices". The dining room (now kitchen) and drawing room did not have the French doors to the south terrace that they currently have. The estate included a bailiff's house, two lodges and two additional cottages and was described as an attractive gentleman's residence.

The estate, of 60 acres (240,000 m^{2}), included the home farm, which was described as "grass and meadowland, lying in a ring fence". The proximity of Codford station (on the Great Western Railway line) and the post and telegraph office are highlighted in the advertisement for sale.

From at least 1926 the house was occupied by Mrs Broughton Hawley. In 1928 the house was bought by a local farmer, Mr Dowding (of Smallbrook Farm, Warminster) who had speculated in property in the past for £3,100. He sold at a loss.

== The 1930s and Lord Headley ==
By 1929 the house and land were auctioned by again, this time by Constable and Maude of London. The agents had attempted to sell the property beforehand, offering the house and land at £4,500 before going to auction "at a low reserve". The property was described as a "Residential and Sporting Estate", and at the time comprised 60 acres (240,000 m^{2}) of park land. There was an ornamental lake, woodland, parkland and pasture, and a variety of estate buildings. The auction lot included stabling and garages (in the two former coach houses, which were advertised as accommodating up to six cars). There were also two lodge buildings: a main entrance lodge to the north east of the property (on the Codford High Street), and a "Station Lodge" with a thatched roof at the end of the south west drive, near the (no longer extant) Codford station. The station was in fact part of the Ashton Gifford hamlet, some way to the south of Codford village.

The estate was advertised as possessing a wide range of farm buildings, and a bailiff's farm house. The bailiff's accommodation was substantial, with three reception rooms in addition to the kitchen.

Ashton Gifford House itself was described as having twelve bedrooms and dressing rooms – though there was only one bathroom servicing the main house (on the first floor) with a ground floor "Gentleman's W.C.". There were separate (outside) facilities for the servants. On the ground floor of the property, along with the "Gentleman's W.C.", there was an entrance hall, dining room, library, and two sitting rooms. At this time the external front door to the house was positioned in the most easterly of the three bays of the entrance portico. The doorway was subsequently repositioned in the central bay, restoring the symmetrical appearance of the front of the house. The Georgian portion of the house had, at this time, additional chimney stacks: two on the eastern and two on the western outer walls, servicing the upper floors of the property. These four stacks were removed later, and only the four central chimney stacks remain. The pineapple roof decoration had yet to be added at this stage, and the roof was pitched throughout (currently only the central part of the roof is pitched, with the east and west wings having flat roofs).

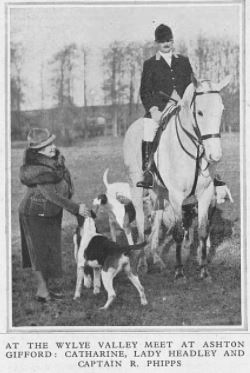
Lady Headley at a meeting of the Wyle Valley foxhunt at Ashton Gifford House, from The Tatler, 30 December 1936

In 1930 and 1931 H. T. Guest was listed as resident at Ashton Gifford House. The house was occupied from at least 1931 (until his death) by the Irish peer Lord Headley – Rowland Allanson-Winn, 5th Baron Headley. Lord Headley is sometimes referred to as the first Muslim peer of Britain (a misnomer, as he was actually the second). He was President of the British Muslim Society, and died in 1935. Lord Headley's widow (his third wife), Lady Catharine Headley (née Lovibond), continued living at Ashton Gifford House until 1940, when she shared the house with Greenways School. Lady Headley opened the gardens to the public in aid of the Queen's Institute and district nursing under the National Gardens Scheme Lord Headley and, after his death, Lady Headley hosted the local Wyle Valley foxhunt on several occasions. The 1933 Wyle Valley Hunt Ball was held at Ashton Gifford House, and was covered by the society papers.

== As a school ==
In 1940 Greenways Preparatory School was evacuated from Bognor Regis, Sussex to Ashton Gifford House, and the property became a school. The poet Adrian Mitchell attending the school (which was run by Vivien Hancock, a friend of his mother) during the 1940s. The poet Siegfried Sassoon's son, George, also attended Greenways in the mid-1940s. The school was a conveniently short distance from Heytesbury, where Sassoon lived. Siegried Sassoon was a close friend of Vivien Hancock (giving her a present of a horse when her own died). Sassoon's wife, Hester, accused Sassoon and Hancock of being "too close" in 1945, and Vivien Hancock eventually threatened legal action against her. Vivien's own son, Anthony, was killed (aged 21) in 1945 on the Western Front in France. When Vivien Hancock needed money to purchase the school outright, it was Sassoon who lent her the £8,000 she required (and who then waived the low rate of interest when Vivien Hancock had difficulty meeting it). The politician and author Ferdinand Mount was briefly a student at Greenways in the 1950s.

Around 1942 the British artist Keith Vaughan was stationed with the Royal Pioneer Corps in Codford, and painted "The Wall at Ashton Gifford" (now in the possession of Manchester Art Gallery). The walled garden at Ashton Gifford were painted in "The Garden at Ashton Gifford" (1944) and "Tree felling at Ashton Gifford" (1942–43). Vaughan described the garden as an "oceanic surging of tangled nettles", with "waist high grass", the wall covered in a "jungle of weed and ivy". Keith Vaughan's "The Working Party", drawn in 1942, has also been tentatively set at Ashton Gifford.

There was a fire at Ashton Gifford House during the late 1940s which partially destroyed the Victorian era service wing of the property. Vivien Hancock blamed this on an "electrical fault", though this has been disputed. Greenways School remained in possession until the late 1960s, when the school closed.

In 1969 planning permission was granted to Harrods Estate Offices to convert the house into three separate flats, which appears not to have been acted upon. By August of the same year the property was acquired by Mr. R. S. Ferrand, who renovated the house as a single-family dwelling. The work was completed in 1972. In the late 1970s the house was occupied by S Cardale. In 1982, however, Ashton Gifford House became a school for boys with behavioural problems (trading as Ashton Gifford School in the 1980s). This finally closed in 1989, and ownership was transferred to a charitable trust.

== Reversion to private dwelling ==
In 1992 Ashton Gifford House was sold, and planning permission was granted to convert it back to a private residence. The Codford by-pass (the A36 road) was built through the northernmost part of the property in the mid-1980s, shortening the drive. (George Sassoon was to unsuccessfully fight a similar encroachment of his father's estate at Heytesbury). This required some of the agricultural land and woodland to be sold to the Department of Transport. The east drive for Ashton Gifford House now emerges onto Sherrington Lane, while the west drive continues its original link with Ashton Gifford Lane (prior to the breakup of the estate, Ashton Gifford Lane made up the complete length of the west drive, terminating at the Thatched or Station Lodge on Station Road). By 1992, all of the farm buildings and lodges had been sold as private dwellings, and the land associated with the house was reduced. The total land associated with the property is now some 20 acres (81,000 m^{2}).
