= Philip Ravenhill =

Major-General Philip Ravenhill CB
- Born: 9 February 1828; Warminster
- Died: 24 February 1891 (aged 63) Kensington
- Known for: CRE in Gibraltar
- Spouse: Jane
- Children: 1

Major-General Philip Ravenhill CB (9 February 1828 – 24 February 1891) was a Royal Engineer who rose to be their commander in Gibraltar.

== Life ==
Ravenhill was born at the Manor House in Warminster in 1828, the second son of John Ravenhill and Sophia Harriet (born Ripley). John Ravenhill was the Chairman of the North Wiltshire Banking Company; he later moved to Ashton Gifford House and was High Sheriff of Wiltshire for 1870.

After receiving his commission in 1846, Ravenhill was sent to Plymouth and then to Malta where he married Jane Carter – who came from a notable Royal Navy family – on 31 March 1853 at St. Paul's Anglican Cathedral, Valletta.

In 1854 he was at the Crimea taking part in the Battle of Alma, the Battle of Inkerman and the Siege of Sebastapol. He had to return to the UK in 1855 with a throat infection.

After a brief desk job, he supervised the building of the Royal Victoria Hospital, Southampton. His tasks included arranging for Queen Victoria to lay the foundation stone on 19 May 1856.

He became a colonel on the staff of the Chief Royal Engineer in Gibraltar in November 1882, commanding the Royal Engineers. He took over from Colonel Ewart. Ravenhill became an honorary major-general when he was retired at the age of 58. Feeling refreshed from 17 years of mild climate, he returned to England, where he took a leading role in charity work, chairing the Royal School for Daughters of Officers of the Army as well as a leading role with the Royal Soldiers' Daughters' School.

Ravenhill died in Kensington in 1891 after suffering from bronchitis.
