= The Association of Art and Antique Dealers =

British trade association

The Association of Art and Antique Dealers (also known as LAPADA, for its former name: London and Provincial Antique Dealers Association) is the largest UK trade association of art and antiques dealers.
