= Codford =

Civil parish in Wiltshire, England

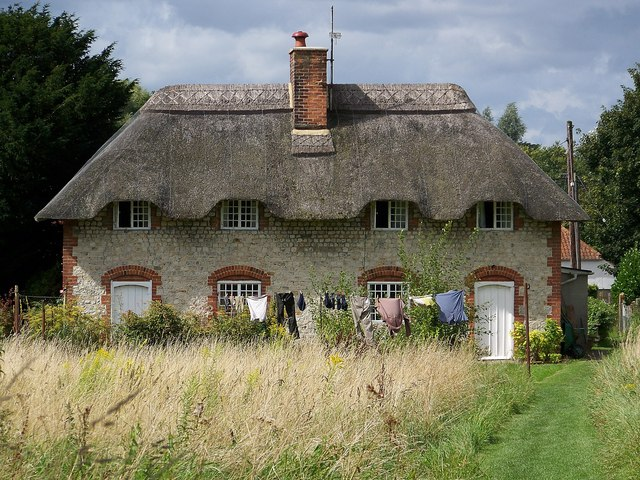

- Location within Wiltshire
- Population: 870 (in 2011)
- OS grid reference: ST968399
- Civil parish: Codford
- Unitary authority: Wiltshire
- Ceremonial county: Wiltshire
- Region: South West
- Country: England
- Sovereign state: United Kingdom
- Post town: Warminster
- Postcode district: BA12
- Dialling code: 01985
- Police: Wiltshire
- Fire: Dorset and Wiltshire
- Ambulance: South Western
- UK Parliament: South West Wiltshire
- Website: Parish Council

Codford is a civil parish south of Salisbury Plain in the Wylye Valley in Wiltshire, England. Its settlements are the adjacent villages of Codford St Peter and Codford St Mary, which lie some 7 miles (11 km) southeast of Warminster.

The two villages are on the A36 road between Salisbury and Warminster. The A36 previously ran along the whole length of the High Street, but a bypass which was built in the 1990s removed the through traffic.

The Chitterne Brook flows north–south through the parish, then turns southeast to flow through Codford St Mary before joining the Wylye.

== History ==
A possible neolithic hillfort or enclosure, Codford Circle, stands at the summit of Codford Hill to the northeast of the villages. In the far north of the parish is Aston Valley Barrow Cemetery, a group of Bronze Age barrows.

Anglo-Saxon records show that in the year 906 the area was known as 'Codan Ford' probably meaning 'the ford of Coda' (a man's name). The river which is forded is called the Wylye, which may mean winding, treacherous or tricky stream.

The 11th-century Domesday survey records Codford as having 28 households, with a value of £16 10s (among three landlords), placing it among the larger settlements of the time.

The Salisbury branch line of the Great Western Railway was opened through the Wylye valley in 1856. Codford station was on the road towards Boyton, south of Codford St Peter. The station closed to passengers in 1955 and to goods in 1963; the line is still in use but there are no local stations between Salisbury and Warminster.

The ancient parishes of St Peter and St Mary became a united benefice in 1930. The parish also incorporates the tything of Ashton Gifford, a settlement that was cleared to make way for the principal house of Codford St Peter, Ashton Gifford House, in the early 19th century. The house was used by a private prep school, Greenways School, from 1940 until the school closed in 1969.

=== Military camps ===
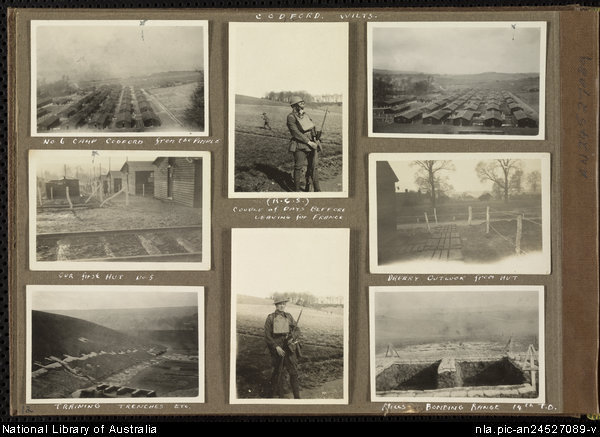
Army Training Camp at Codford, 1917

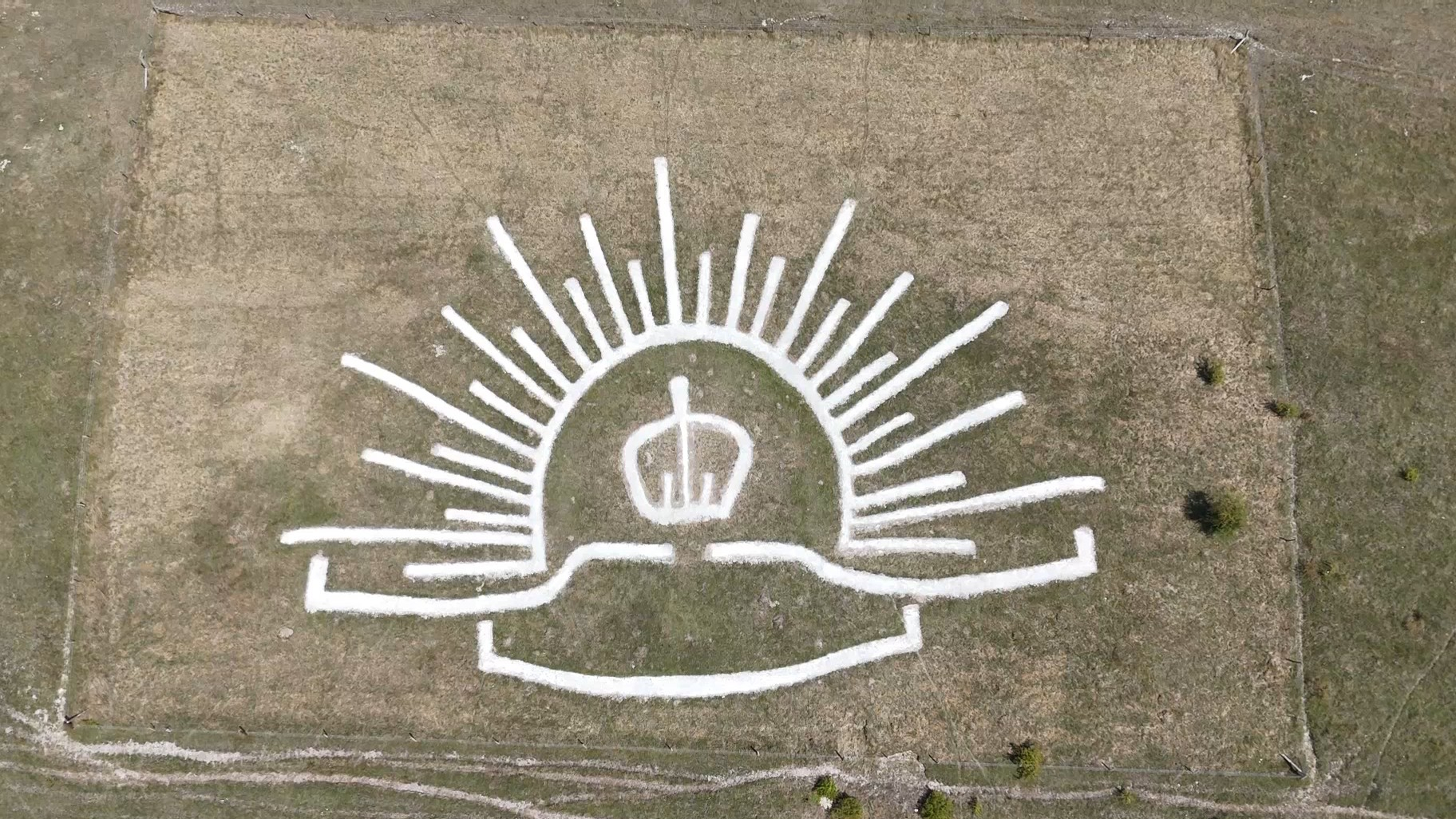
The Rising Sun badge on Lamb Down

The Codford area has had a long history with ANZAC soldiers: during World War I, large training and transfer camps were established for the tens of thousands of troops waiting to be deployed to France. Codford also became a depot in 1916 for the men who had been evacuated from the front line and were not fit to return to the front. It was the site of the No. 3 New Zealand General Hospital.

The meticulously maintained Commonwealth War Graves Commission cemetery nearby is the second largest New Zealand War Grave Cemetery in the UK, and contains the graves of 97 Anzac troops, 66 New Zealanders, and 31 Australians, alongside one Welsh Guardsman from WWII. The effect of two World Wars still resonates in the local community and there is still a sense of welcoming towards Australians and New Zealanders. Codford villagers hold a remembrance ceremony on 25 April (Anzac Day) at 6.30 am each year.

==== Hillside badge ====
Codford's 'Anzac Badge' was the idea of an Australian Brigade Commander during World War I, who wished to leave a visible memento of his brigade when it departed. This consists of a gigantic Rising Sun badge (measuring 53 × 45 metres), carved in 1916 into the grass of nearby Lamb Down to expose the underlying bright white chalk (51°09′13.50″N 02°01′28.16″W). The soldiers of 13 Trg Bn AIF who maintained the badge as a form of punishment named the site 'Misery Hill'. The badge was not fully completed, with the words "Australian Commonwealth Military Forces" and some ribbons missing. The Fovant Badges, roughly 10 miles (16 km) away, have a completed version of the Rising Sun badge, built slightly earlier in 1916.

== Parish churches ==
The two Anglican parish churches, although less than half a mile (800m) apart, continue in use; both are Grade II* listed buildings. The benefices were united in 1909, with the incumbent to live at St Peter's parsonage; today the parishes are part of the Upper Wylye Valley team ministry.

=== St Peter's ===
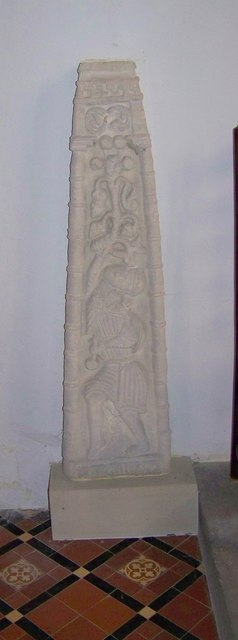
9th-century cross shaft, St Peter's

The building is from the 13th century, with a tower and south porch added in the 15th. Restoration in 1863 was by T.H. Wyatt. The church contains a 9th-century Oolitic limestone cross shaft with fine carving, of which Pevsner writes "This is of course what matters at Codford". The font is 12th century.

=== St Mary's ===
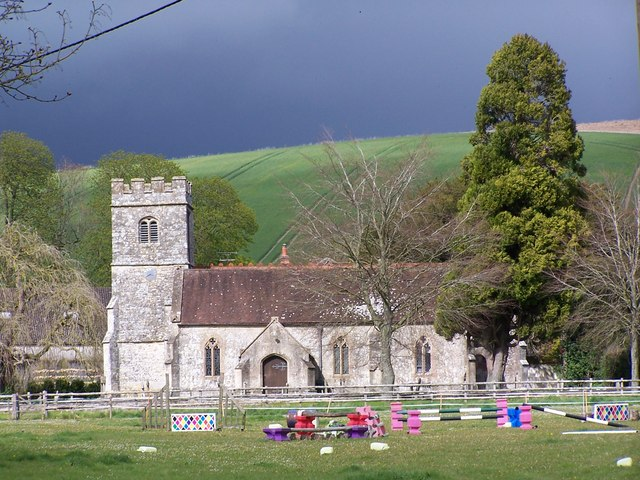
St Mary's Church, Codford

The building originates in the late 12th/13th century, with a tower from the late 14th/15th; the chancel was rebuilt in the 17th century. In 1843-4 it was considered necessary to rebuild the church, apart from the tower and part of the chancel, on the same foundations; the south porch was moved and a south aisle added. The interior was again restored and reordered in 1878-9 by E Lingen Barker, and is described in the listed building record as "very characterful in the High Victorian style".

== Local government ==
Local government services are provided by Wiltshire Council, a unitary authority with offices in Trowbridge, some fifteen miles to the north. Codford also has its own elected parish council of nine members.

The civil parishes of Codford St Peter and Codford St Mary were created in the 19th century, then dissolved and replaced by Codford parish in 1934.

== Amenities ==
The Woolstore Theatre houses an amateur theatre company. The High Street building, part of a 19th-century wool store, was converted into a theatre in 1928.

Wylye Valley Church of England VA Primary School serves Codford and nearby parishes. The school opened on a new site in 1971, replacing two 19th-century schools. Codford St Mary school opened in 1876 and was enlarged in 1889; Codford St Peter school, near Ashton Gifford House, opened in 1841. By 1966 the number of children in the villages had fallen and St Peter's was closed.

There is a village hall, rebuilt and enlarged in 1993.

A Berrys Coaches service to/from London calls at a nearby stop on the A36.

== Notable people ==
- William Creed, a 17th-century Rector of Codford St Mary
- Robert Dampier (1799–1874), an artist and clergyman, was born and grew up at Codford St Peter, where his father was rector.
- James Ingram (1774–1850), an Oxford don who grew up at Codford St Mary, was Rawlinsonian Professor of Anglo-Saxon and President of Trinity College, Oxford.
- Rowland Allanson-Winn, 5th Baron Headley (1855–1935), also known as Shaikh Rahmatullah al-Farooq, owned and lived at Ashton Gifford House from 1929 until his death.
- Vice-Admiral the Hon. Herbert Edward Holmes à Court (1869–1934), was born at Codford St Peter
- Sir William Mahon, 7th Baronet (born 1940), a retired soldier, lives at Codford.

== See also ==
- List of hill figures in Wiltshire
