= Wiltshire Museum =

Coordinates: 51.3498°N 1.9935°W

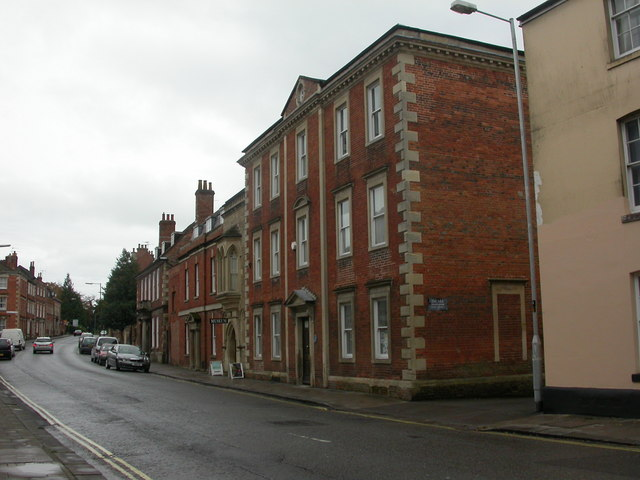
- Established: 1873
- Location: Long Street, Devizes, Wiltshire, England
- Type: Archaeology Museum, History museum
- Director: David Dawson
- Curator: Lisa Brown
- Website: www.wiltshiremuseum.org.uk

The Wiltshire Museum, formerly known as Wiltshire Heritage Museum and Devizes Museum, is a museum, archive and library and art gallery established in 1874 in Devizes, Wiltshire, England. The museum was created and is run by the Wiltshire Archaeological and Natural History Society, a registered charity founded in 1853.

== History ==
The society bought a former grammar school on Long Street, south of the town's market place, to house the museum. It later expanded into two Georgian houses on either side, and still occupies these premises today.

The museum maintains a collection covering the archaeology, art, history and natural history of Wiltshire. The collection covers periods of history from as far back as the Palaeolithic and also has Neolithic, Bronze Age, Roman, Saxon, Mediaeval and more recent historical artefacts. Among the prehistoric collections are items from the Stonehenge and Avebury World Heritage Site. Several of the collections have been designated as being a significant part of England's cultural heritage.

One of the most important collections at the museum is the finds from Bush Barrow, an early Bronze Age burial mound in the Stonehenge area. The barrow was excavated by William Cunnington in 1808 and produced the richest and most important finds from a Bronze Age grave in the Stonehenge Landscape to date. The finds were acquired by the museum in 1883 and were displayed there until 1922, when they were indefinitely loaned to the British Museum. After a controversial restoration of the largest piece that may not reflect its original finish, the pieces were returned to Devizes in 1985.

The natural history collection includes remains of a plesiosaur called Bathyspondylus found at Swindon in 1774. Bathyspondylus swindoniensis was first described in 1982 from the museum's specimens.

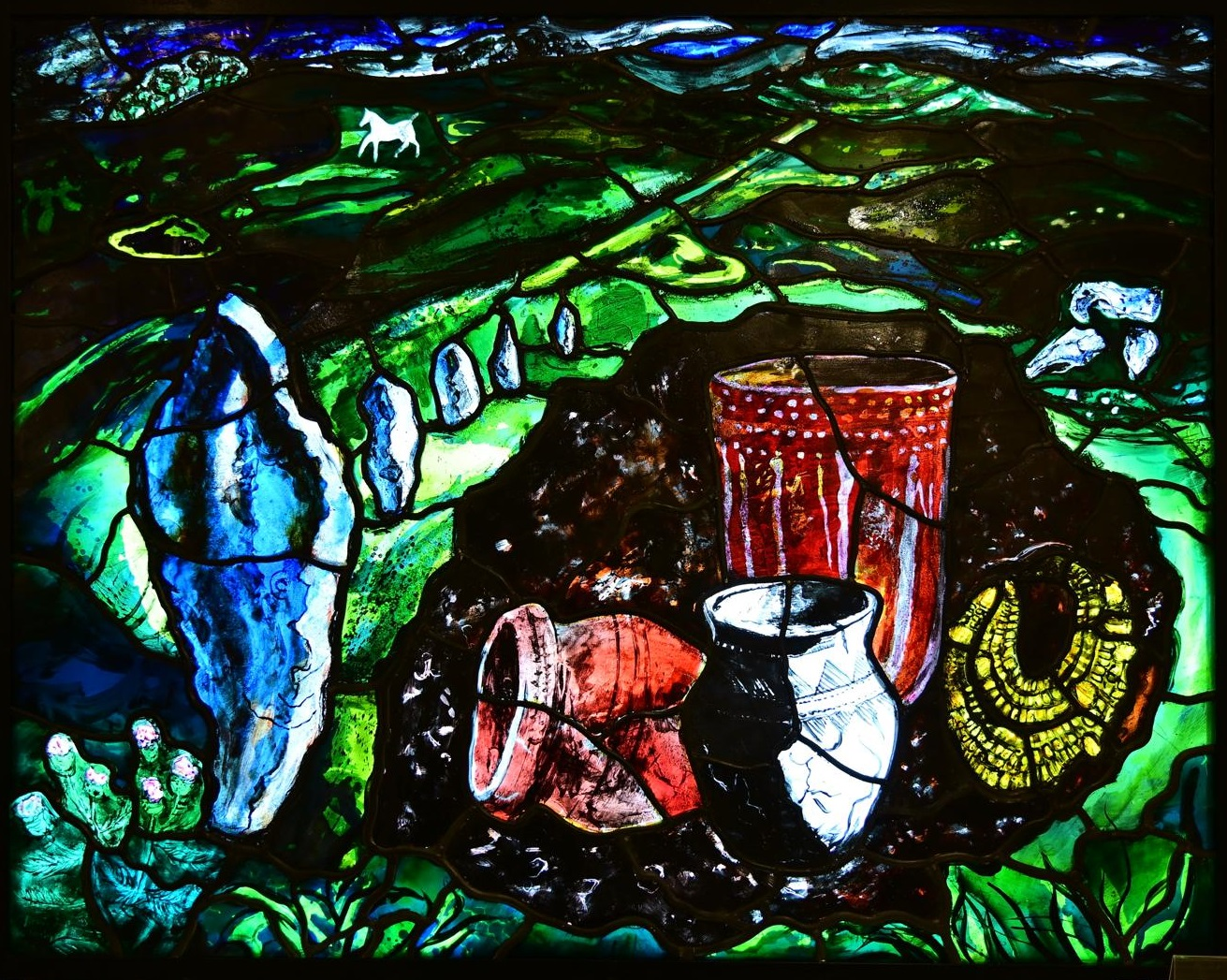
Stained glass by John Piper

On permanent display in the first floor galleries of the museum is a stained glass panel designed by John Piper and manufactured by David Wasley. It was commissioned by the museum in 1981 and installed in 1982. The rectangular work, displayed in a backlit frame, depicts various antiquities set in a Wiltshire landscape. Among the places depicted are the Cherhill White Horse, an avenue of Sarsen stones and the Devil's Den, shown alongside the Stonehenge urns, the Upton Lovell amber necklace and woolly-headed thistles.

== Exhibitions ==
Since 2013, a permanent exhibition Gold from the Time of Stonehenge displays 30 pieces of Early Bronze Age gold, including the Bush Barrow finds.

The museum held a major exhibition of works by Eric Ravilious titled Eric Ravilious: Downland Man from September 2021 until January 2022. It featured loans from a number of institutions, including the Victoria and Albert Museum, the British Museum, the Imperial War Museum and the Towner Eastbourne gallery, as well as works from private collections.

== Future premises ==
Since 2018, there has been an intention to relocate the museum to the derelict former Devizes Assize Court in the northwest quarter of Devizes town centre. In June 2023, Wiltshire Museum received £300,000 from the National Lottery Heritage Fund to enable the museum – working closely with the Assize Court Trust – to develop plans for the project before applying for a full National Lottery grant. A full award of £8,445,566 was decided upon in November 2025. The museum received planning permission for the court's development in August 2025 and hoped to reopen the building in 2030.

== See also ==
- The Salisbury Museum
- Wiltshire Record Society
