= William Cunnington =

Antiquary

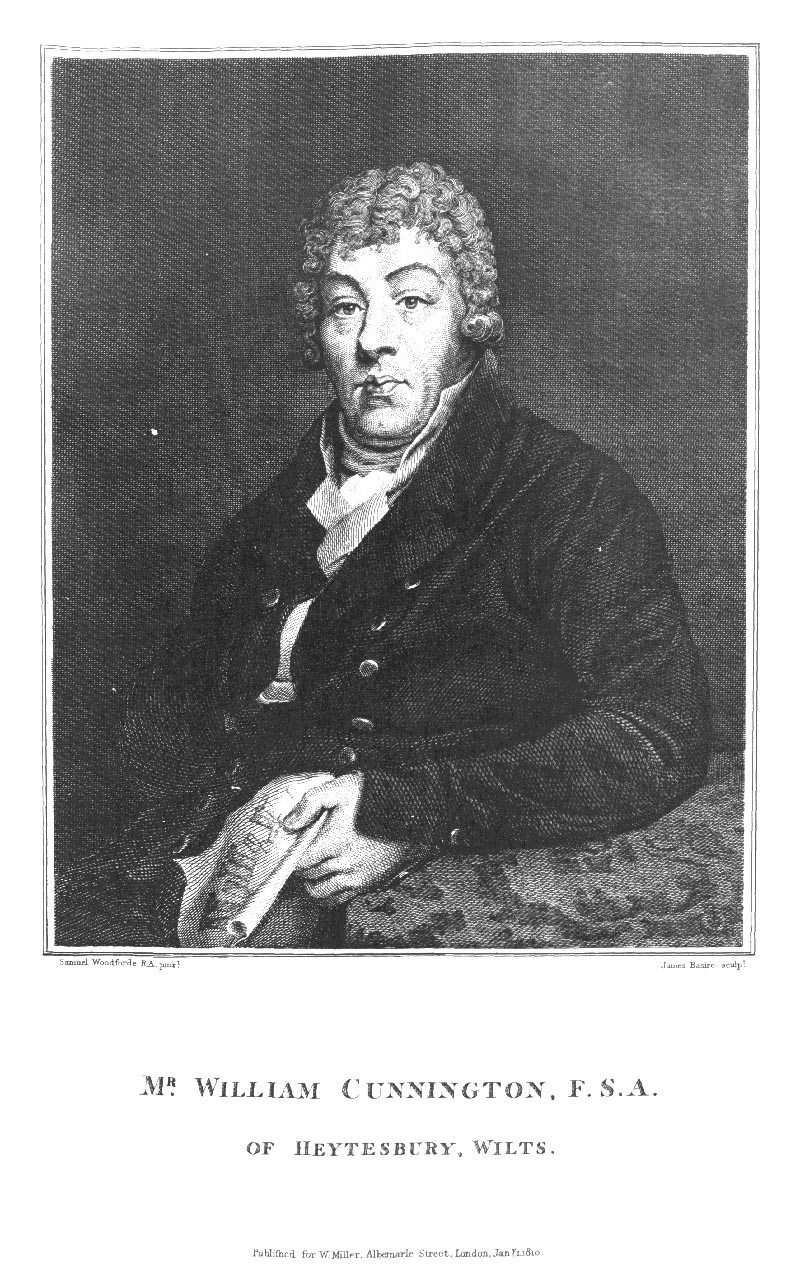
Portrait of William Cunnington, by Samuel Woodforde

William Cunnington FSA (1754 – 31 December 1810) was an English antiquarian and archaeologist.

== Archaeological investigations ==
Cunnington was a self-educated merchant, who developed an interest in the rich archaeological landscape around the Wiltshire village of Heytesbury where he lived and worked. In contrast to the vast majority of antiquarians of the time, Cunnington realised that to fully understand the barrows which fascinated him, they should be excavated and recorded carefully and methodically. Beginning his work around 1798, the initial investigations were self-funded, but increasingly they attracted the interest of a succession of wealthy patrons including H.P. Wyndham MP (whose sister Laetitia lived at Heytesbury House) and culminating in Sir Richard Colt Hoare (1758–1838) of Stourhead.

Hoare's substantial financial investment in Cunnington's work from 1804, and the consequent increase in the number of excavations undertaken, enabled the latter to excavate several hundred barrows across south Wiltshire. By modern standards, Cunnington's excavation methodology – predominantly involving a shaft trench dug from the crown of a barrow to ground level in search of "novelties" – was poor, but he was the first archaeologist to undertake such an extensive campaign of work and was a true pioneer. It was not until the work of Thomas Bateman (1821–1861) in Derbyshire in the 1840s, that large scale excavations saw a significant step forward in methodology.

Stephen and John Parker, also of Heytesbury, worked on nearly all of Cunnington's excavations up to 1810 and were held in some esteem as reliable, careful and experienced excavators. John Parker is more frequently discussed in correspondence between Cunnington and Hoare and it is clear that he was often despatched on travels across the Wiltshire Downs in search of new sites. John, born in 1780, is portrayed with some warmth by Cunnington and he comes across as hard-working and enthusiastic, being deeply disappointed by the failure of excavations to produce interesting material. 2009 research by Paul Everill has revealed the first reference to the use of a trowel on an archaeological site in a letter from Cunnington to Hoare in 1808, which describes John Parker using one in the excavation of Bush Barrow.

== Personal life ==
Cunnington was born at Grafton, Northamptonshire, in 1754, and by about 1775 he had settled as a tradesman at Heytesbury, Wiltshire.

He married Mary, daughter of Robert Meares, in 1787, and they had three daughters. One daughter, Elisabeth, married her cousin William Cunnington II; their son William Cunnington III (1813–1906) was instrumental in the formation of the Wiltshire Archaeological and Natural History Society in 1853.

== Legacy ==
Along with Richard Colt Hoare, Cunnington was the subject of an exhibition at the Wiltshire Museum in 2003. The museum holds the archives made by Cunnington, along with watercolour drawings made by Philip Crocker and the objects that he excavated.
