= Feet of fines =

Medieval English archival copy of an agreement in a lawsuit over land

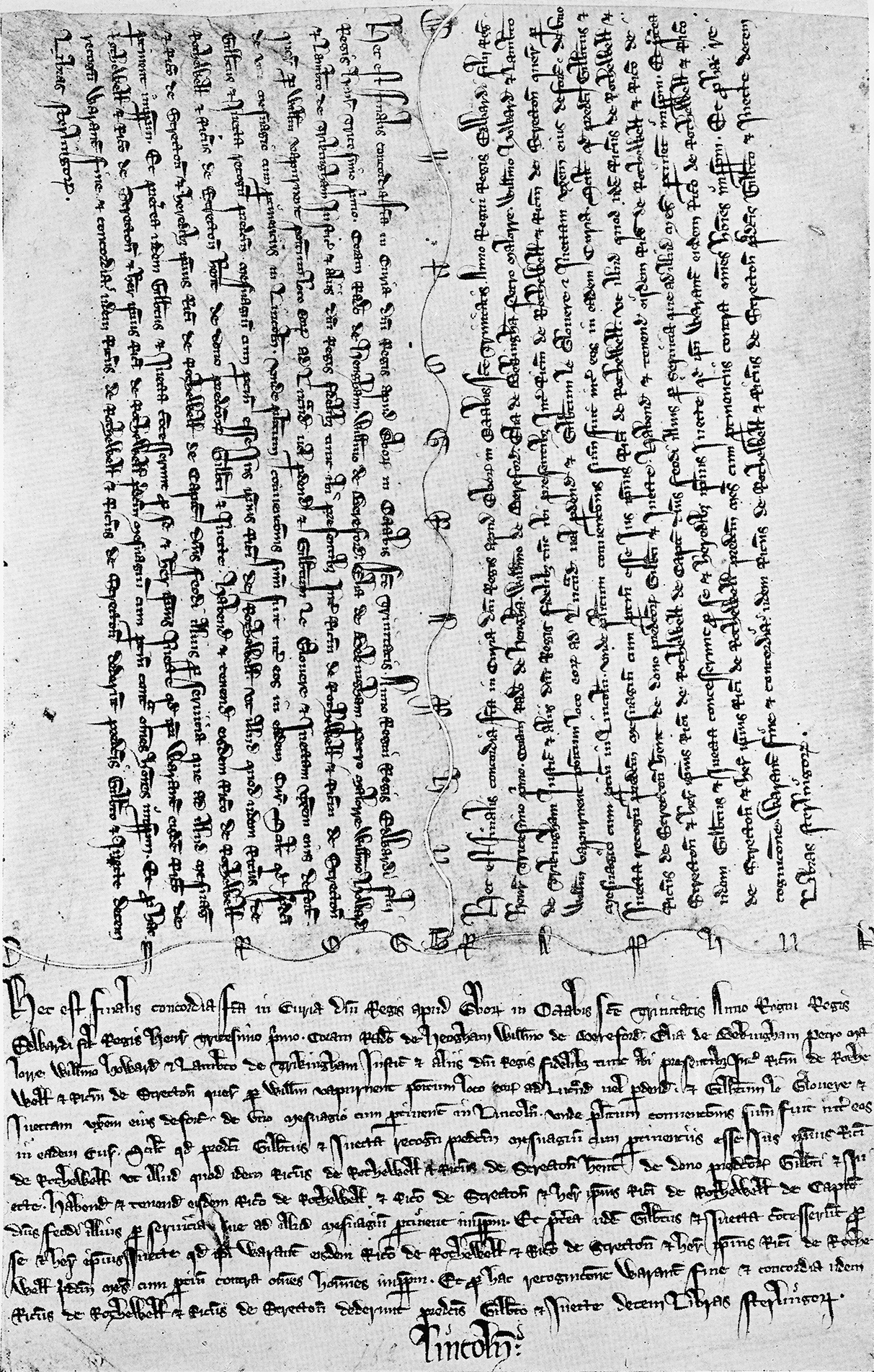
A specimen of a fine from 1303, including both parties' chirographs and the foot of the fine at the bottom

A foot of fine (plural, feet of fines; Latin: pes finis; plural, pedes finium) is the archival copy of the agreement between two parties in an English lawsuit over land, most commonly the fictitious suit (in reality a conveyance) known as a fine of lands or final concord. The procedure was followed from around 1195 until 1833, and the considerable body of resulting records is now held at The National Archives, Kew, London.

== History ==
In the reign of Henry II of England, the royal justices first began the practice of registering the settlement of disagreements over land by having both parties bring a suit before the royal courts. The resulting decision was thus given royal sanction.

At first, two copies of the agreement ("fine") were made, created as chirographs: i.e. the text was written in duplicate on a single piece of parchment, which was then cut in half, one copy going to each of the litigants. Under Hubert Walter's justiciarship, probably about 1195, the practice was started of writing the text in triplicate, so that a third copy could be filed in the Treasury. This copy of the text was written at the foot of the piece of parchment, and so became known as the "foot of the fine", or simply "foot of fine".

The first recorded foot of fine is endorsed with the statement "This is the first chirograph that was made in the king's court in the form of three chirographs, according to the command of his lordship of Canterbury and other barons of the king, to the end that by this form a record can be made to be passed on to the treasurer to put in the treasury." The agreement concerns Walter's brother Theobald, who was the plaintiff.

Within a few years, the practice of recording feet of fines had spread widely, and even to Scotland, as in 1198 an agreement between William de Bruce of Annandale and Adam of Carlisle over eight ploughgates in Lockerbie, Scotland was filed with the English treasury, recorded with those from Northumberland. While early fines could be made in the Exchequer, after the early 14th century, fines were always made in the Court of Common Pleas.

A fine of 20 January 1270 contains the first use of the Medieval Latin phrase mutatis mutandis.

The practice survived until fines were abolished by the Fines and Recoveries Act 1833.

== Diagrammatic representation ==
FINE Final concord Court's decision recorded three times on one face of one document
Decision copy 1 Litigant one	Decision copy 2 Litigant two
Foot of Fine; Decision copy 3 Court archive

== Publication ==
Many feet of fines have been published by antiquarian, text publication and other societies.

=== General ===
- Hunter, Joseph, ed. (1835). Fines sive Pedes Finium sive Finales Concordiae in Curia Domini Regis, ab Anno Septimo Regni Regis Ricardi I ad Annum Decimum Sextum Regis Johannis, A.D. 1195–A.D. 1214. Record Commission. [covering Bedfordshire, Berkshire, Buckinghamshire, Cambridgeshire and Cornwall to 1214]
- Hunter, Joseph, ed. (1844). Fines sive Pedes Finium sive Finales Concordiae in Curia Domini Regis, ab Anno Septimo Regni Regis Ricardi I ad Annum Decimum Sextum Regis Johannis, A.D. 1195–A.D. 1214. Public Record Office. [covering Cumberland, Derbyshire, Devon and Dorset to 1214]
- Feet of Fines of the reign of Henry II and of the first seven years of the reign of King Richard I, A.D. 1182 to A.D. 1196. Pipe Roll Society. Vol. 17. 1894.
- Feet of Fines of the seventh and eighth years of the reign of King Richard I, A.D. 1196 to A.D. 1197. Pipe Roll Society. Vol. 20. 1896.
- Feet of Fines of the ninth year of the reign of King Richard I, A.D. 1197 to A.D. 1198. Pipe Roll Society. Vol. 23. 1898.
- Feet of Fines of the tenth year of the reign of King Richard I, A.D. 1198 to A.D. 1199, excepting those for the counties of Bedford, Berkshire, Buckingham, Cambridge, Devon, and Dorset. Also a Roll of the King's Court in the reign of King Richard I. Pipe Roll Society. Vol. 24. 1900.

=== County ===
Bedfordshire

- Fowler, G. Herbert, ed. (1919). A Calendar of the Feet of Fines for Bedfordshire, preserved in the Public Record Office, of the reigns of Richard I, John, and Henry III. Bedfordshire Historical Record Society. Vol. 6.
- Fowler, G. Herbert, ed. (1924). "A Calendar of the Feet of Fines for Bedfordshire, pt. 3: Reign of Edward I, with some earlier fines". Miscellanea. Bedfordshire Historical Record Society. Vol. 8. pp. 3–82.

Buckinghamshire

- Hughes, M. W., ed. (1940). A Calendar of the Feet of Fines for the County of Buckingham: 7 Richard I to 44 Henry III [1195–1259]. Records Branch of the Buckinghamshire Archaeological Society. Vol. 4.
- Travers, Anita, ed. (1989). A Calendar of the Feet of Fines for Buckinghamshire, 1259–1307; with an appendix, 1179–1259. Buckinghamshire Record Society. Vol. 25.

Cambridgeshire

- Rye, Walter, ed. (1891). Pedes Finium: or fines, relating to the county of Cambridge, levied in the King's court from the seventh year of Richard I to the end of the reign of Richard III. Cambridge Antiquarian Society (octavo ser.). Vol. 26.
- Palmer, W. M., ed. (1898). Feet of Fines for Cambridgeshire, Henry VII to Elizabeth: Divers Counties fines (containing refs. to Cambridgeshire), Richard I to Richard III: De Banco rolls, Edward IV & Henry VII. Norwich.

Cornwall

- Rowe, J. H., ed. (1914–50). Cornwall Feet of Fines. Devon and Cornwall Record Society. (2 vols.)

Cumberland

- Transactions of the Cumberland and Westmorland Antiquarian and Archaeological Society, 7
- Steel, J. P., ed. (n.d.). Feet of Fines, Cumberland, during the reign of Henry VIII [1509–1547]. London: Mitchell.
- Steel, J. P., ed. (1921). Feet of Fines, Cumberland, during the reigns of Edward VI, Mary, Philip and Mary, and Elizabeth [1547–1603]. London: Warren Hall & Lovitt.

Derbyshire

- Transactions of the Derbyshire Archaeological Society (1885–1896)
- Garratt, H. J. H.; Rawcliffe, Carole, eds. (1985). Derbyshire Feet of Fines, 1323–1546. Derbyshire Record Society. Vol. 11.

Devon

- Reichel, O.; Oswald, J.; Prideaux, F. B.; Tapley-Soper, H., eds. (1912–39). Devon Feet of Fines. Devon and Cornwall Record Society. (2 vols.)

Dorset

- Fry, Edward Alexander; Fry, George S., eds. (1896). Full Abstracts of the Feet of Fines relating to the County of Dorset, remaining in the Public Record Office, London: from their commencement in the reign of Richard I. Dorset Records. Vol. 5.

Essex

- Kirk, R. E. G., ed. (1899–1910). Feet of Fines for Essex: Volume 1: A.D. 1182–A.D. 1272. Essex Archaeological Society. ISBN 9780904920260.
- Kirk, Ernest F., ed. (1913–1928). Feet of Fines for Essex: Volume 2: A.D. 1272–A.D. 1326. Essex Archaeological Society.
- Fowler, R. C.; Ratcliff, S. C., eds. (1929–1949). Feet of Fines for Essex: Volume 3: A.D. 1327–A.D. 1422. Essex Archaeological Society.
- Fitch, Marc; Reaney, P. H., eds. (1964). Feet of Fines for Essex: Volume 4: 1423–1547. Essex Archaeological Society.
- Fitch, Marc; Emmison, Frederick, eds. (1991). Feet of Fines for Essex: Volume 5: 1547–1580. Oxford: Leopard's Head Press.
- Emmison, Frederick, ed. (1993). Feet of Fines for Essex: Volume 6: 1581–1603. Oxford: Leopard's Head Press.

Gloucestershire

- Elrington, C. R., ed. (2003). Abstracts of Feet of Fines relating to Gloucestershire, 1199–1299. Gloucestershire Record Series. Vol. 16.
- Elrington, C. R., ed. (2006). Abstracts of Feet of Fines relating to Gloucestershire, 1300–59. Gloucestershire Record Series. Vol. 20.
- Elrington, C. R., ed. (2013). Abstracts of Feet of Fines relating to Gloucestershire, 1360–1508. Gloucestershire Record Series. Vol. 27.

Kent

- Churchill, Irene J.; Griffin, Ralph; Hardman, F. W.; Jessup, Frank W., eds. (1956). Calendar of Kent Feet of Fines to the end of Henry III's reign. Kent Archaeological Society Records Branch. Vol. 15.

Lincolnshire

- Boyd, W.; Massingberd, W. O., eds. (1896). Lincolnshire Records: Abstracts of Final Concords, temp. Richard I, John and Henry III, vol. I. London: Spottiswoode.
- Foster, C. W., ed. (1920). Final Concords of the County of Lincoln from the Feet of Fines preserved in the Public Record Office, A.D. 1244–1272: with additions from various sources, A.D. 1176–1250, vol. II. Lincoln Record Society. Vol. 17.
- Walker, Margaret S., ed. (1954). Feet of Fines for the County of Lincoln for the reign of King John, 1199–1212: now first printed from the original in the custody of the Right Hon. the Master of the Rolls. Pipe Roll Society. Vol. 67.

Norfolk

- Rye, Walter, ed. (1885). A Short Calendar of the Feet of Fines for Norfolk, Part I: Richard I to Edward I. Norwich: A.H. Goose.
- Rye, Walter, ed. (1886). A Short Calendar of the Feet of Fines for Norfolk, Part II: Edward II to Richard III. Norwich: A.H. Goose.
- Dodwell, Barbara, ed. (1952). Feet of Fines for the County of Norfolk for the tenth year of the reign of King Richard the First, 1198–1199, and for the first four years of the reign of King John, 1199–1202. Pipe Roll Society. Vol. 65.
- Dodwell, Barbara, ed. (1958). Feet of Fines for the county of Norfolk for the reign of King John, 1201–1215, for the county of Suffolk for the reign of King John 1199–1214. Pipe Roll Society. Vol. 70.

Somerset

- Green, Emanuel, ed. (1892). Pedes Finium, commonly called Feet of Fines, for the County of Somerset: First Series: Richard I to Edward I, A.D. 1196 to A.D. 1307. Somerset Record Society. Vol. 6.
- Green, Emanuel, ed. (1898). Pedes Finium, commonly called Feet of Fines, for the County of Somerset: Second Series: 1 Edward II to 20 Edward III, A.D. 1307 to A.D. 1346. Somerset Record Society. Vol. 12.
- Green, Emanuel, ed. (1902). Pedes Finium, commonly called Feet of Fines, for the County of Somerset: Third Series: 21 Edward III to 20 Richard II, A.D. 1347 to A.D. 1399. Somerset Record Society. Vol. 17.
- Green, Emanuel, ed. (1906). Pedes Finium, commonly called Feet of Fines, for the County of Somerset: Fourth Series: Henry IV to Henry VI. Somerset Record Society. Vol. 22.

Staffordshire

- Wrottesley, Hon. George, ed. (1882). "Calendar of final concords or pedes finium, Staffordshire, temp. Ric. I and King John, including the final concords of mixed counties to which Staffordshire tenants are parties". Collections for a History of Staffordshire. Vol. 3. William Salt Archaeological Society. pp. 165–77.
- Wrottesley, Hon. George, ed. (1883). "Calendar of final concords, or, pedes finium, Staffordshire, temp. Henry III". Collections for a History of Staffordshire. Vol. 4. William Salt Archaeological Society. pp. 217–63.
- Wrottesley, Hon. George, ed. (1888). "Pedes finium, or fines of mixed counties, which include manors and tenements in Staffordshire, temp. Henry VII, Henry VIII, Edward VI, and Philip and Mary". Collections for a History of Staffordshire. Vol. 12. William Salt Archaeological Society.
- Wrottesley, Hon. George, ed. (1890). "The final concords, or feet of fines, Staffordshire, A.D. 1327 to A.D. 1547". Collections for a History of Staffordshire. Vol. 11. William Salt Archaeological Society. pp. 127–292.
- Boyd, W., ed. (1890). "Final concords, or feet of fines, Staffordshire, Edward IV to 1 Elizabeth". Collections for a History of Staffordshire. Vol. 12. William Salt Archaeological Society.
- Boyd, W., ed. (1892). "Final concords, or feet of fines, Staffordshire, 2 to 15 Elizabeth". Collections for a History of Staffordshire. Vol. 13. William Salt Archaeological Society.
- Boyd, W., ed. (1893). "Final concords, or feet of fines, Staffordshire, Elizabeth, A.D. 1573 to A.D. 1580". Collections for a History of Staffordshire. Vol. 14. William Salt Archaeological Society.
- Boyd, W., ed. (1894). "Final concords, or feet of fines, Staffordshire, Elizabeth, A.D. 1580 to A.D. 1589". Collections for a History of Staffordshire. Vol. 15. William Salt Archaeological Society.
- Boyd, W., ed. (1895). "Final concords, or feet of fines, Staffordshire, Elizabeth, A.D. 1589 to A.D. 1603". Collections for a History of Staffordshire. Vol. 16. William Salt Archaeological Society.
- Boyd, W., ed. (1896). "Final concords, or feet of fines of mixed counties (which include Staffordshire), temp. Elizabeth". Collections for a History of Staffordshire. Vol. 17. William Salt Archaeological Society.
- Boyd, W., ed. (1897). "Final concords, or feet of fines of mixed counties (which include Staffordshire), temp. Elizabeth". Collections for a History of Staffordshire. Vol. 18. William Salt Archaeological Society.
- Boyd, W., ed. (1897). "Final concords, or feet of fines of cities in Staffordshire, temp. Elizabeth". Collections for a History of Staffordshire. Vol. 18. William Salt Archaeological Society.
- Boyd, W., ed. (1897). "Final concords, or feet of fines of Staffordshire, 1 to 4 James I". Collections for a History of Staffordshire. Vol. 18. William Salt Archaeological Society.

Suffolk

- Rye, Walter, ed. (1900). A Calendar of the Feet of Fines for Suffolk, Richard I to Richard III. Ipswich: The Suffolk Institute of Archaeology and Natural History.
- Dodwell, Barbara, ed. (1958). Feet of Fines for the county of Norfolk for the reign of King John, 1201–1215, for the county of Suffolk for the reign of King John 1199–1214. Pipe Roll Society. Vol. 70.

Surrey

- Lewis, Frank B., ed. (1894). Pedes Finium, or, Fines relating to the County of Surrey, levied in the King's court, from the seventh year of Richard I, to the end of the reign of Henry VII. Surrey Archaeological Collections extra volume. Vol. 1.
- Meekings, C. A. F., ed. (1946). Abstracts of Surrey Feet of Fines, 1509–1558. Surrey Record Society. Vol. 19.
- Webb, Cliff, ed. (1998). A List of Surrey Feet of Fines 1558–1602. West Surrey Family History Society.

Sussex

- Salzmann, L. F., ed. (1903–16). An Abstract of Feet of Fines relating to the County of Sussex. Sussex Record Society. (3 vols.: part I, 2 Richard I–33 Henry III [1190–1249]; part II, 34 Henry III–35 Edward I [1249–1307]; part III, 1 Edward II–24 Henry VII [1307–1509])

Wiltshire

- Fry, Edward Alexander, ed. (1930). A Calendar of the Feet of Fines relating to the County of Wiltshire, remaining in the Public Record Office, London, from their commencement in the reign of Richard I (1195) to the end of Henry III (1272). Wiltshire Archaeological and Natural History Society.
- Pugh, R. B., ed. (1939). Abstracts of Feet of Fines relating to Wiltshire for the Reigns of Edward I and Edward II. Wiltshire Archaeological and Natural History Society Records Branch. Vol. 1.
- Elrington, C. R., ed. (1974). Abstracts of Feet of Fines relating to Wiltshire for the Reign of Edward III. Wiltshire Record Society. Vol. 29.
- Kirby, J. L., ed. (1986). Abstracts of Feet of Fines relating to Wiltshire, 1377–1509. Wiltshire Record Society. Vol. 41.

Yorkshire

- Brown, William, ed. (1897). Pedes finium Ebor, regnante Johanne: A.D. MCXCIX–A.D. MCCXIV [1199–1214]. Surtees Society. Vol. 94. Durham [Eng.]
- Parker, John, ed. (1921). Feet of Fines for the County of York from 1218 to 1231. Yorkshire Archaeological Society Record Series. Vol. 62.
- Parker, John, ed. (1925). Feet of Fines for the County of York from 1232 to 1246. Yorkshire Archaeological Society Record Series. Vol. 67.
- Parker, John, ed. (1932). Feet of Fines for the County of York from 1246 to 1272. Yorkshire Archaeological Society Record Series. Vol. 82.
- Slingsby, F. H., ed. (1956). Feet of Fines for the County of York from 1272 to 1300. Yorkshire Archaeological Society Record Series. Vol. 121. Printed for the Society.
- Roper, M., ed. (1966). Feet of Fines for the County of York from 1300 to 1314. Yorkshire Archaeological Society Record Series. Vol. 127.
- Roper, M.; Kitching, Christopher, eds. (2006). Feet of Fines for the County of York from 1314 to 1326. Yorkshire Archaeological Society Record Series. Vol. 158.
- Baildon, W. Paley, ed. (1910). Feet of Fines for the County of York from 1327 to 1347, 1–20 Edward III. Yorkshire Archaeological Society Record Series. Vol. 42.
- Baildon, W. Paley, ed. (1915). Feet of Fines for the County of York from 1347 to 1377, 21–51 Edward III. Yorkshire Archaeological Society Record Series. Vol. 52.
- Collins, F., ed. (1887). Feet of Fines for the Tudor Period. Part I: [1486–1570]. Yorkshire Archaeological Society Record Series. Vol. 2.
- Collins, F., ed. (1888). Feet of Fines for the Tudor Period. Part II: [1571–1582]. Yorkshire Archaeological Society Record Series. Vol. 5.
- Collins, F., ed. (1889). Feet of Fines for the Tudor Period. Part III: [1583–1594]. Yorkshire Archaeological Society Record Series. Vol. 7.
- Collins, F., ed. (1890). Feet of Fines for the Tudor Period. Part IV: [1594–1603]. Yorkshire Archaeological Society Record Series. Vol. 8.
- Brigg, W., ed. (1915). Yorkshire Fines for the Stuart Period. Vol. I: 1–11 Jas. I, 1603–1614. Yorkshire Archaeological Society Record Series. Vol. 53.
- Brigg, W., ed. (1917). Yorkshire Fines for the Stuart Period. Vol. II: 12–22 Jas. I, 1614–1625. Yorkshire Archaeological Society Record Series. Vol. 58.
