= Gloucestershire Victoria County History =

Encyclopaedic history of Gloucestershire

The VCH emblem, which includes the coat of arms of England

Gloucestershire Victoria County History is an encyclopaedic history of the county of Gloucestershire in England. It forms part of the overall Victoria County History of England founded in 1899 in honour of Queen Victoria. With twelve volumes published in the series A History of the County of Gloucestershire, the Gloucestershire Victoria County History is about halfway through its history of all the parishes in the county. Ten volumes have been published to date, and a further four volumes are in preparation.

== Overview ==
The project is promoted by the Gloucestershire County History Trust, which was established in April 2010 to lead the publication of further volumes following the termination of a tripartite partnership with the University of Gloucestershire and Gloucestershire County Council. Work is overseen, and volumes published, by the Institute of Historical Research of the University of London.

The then chairman of the Gloucestershire County History Trust, Sir Nicholas Mander, said in a news release in December 2010: "While the big red volumes are still at the heart of the Gloucestershire Victoria County History, we are keen to take our county history out to as many people as possible, through affordable publications, modern technology, and new ways of working."

In October 2010, the Gloucestershire County History Trust appointed a new county editor, John Chandler, to oversee the completion of volume 13. The Trust has since initiated work on 3 further volumes: 14 (Yate and the Sodburys), 15 (Cheltenham and surrounding parishes) and 16 (Cirencester and area). With the publication of volume 13 in September 2016 John Chandler retired as county editor, becoming consultant editor for the remaining volumes.

== List of former County Editors ==
- William Page
- C. R. Elrington
- N. M. Herbert
- R. B. Pugh
- Carrie Smith
- A. R. J. Jurica
- John Chandler

== Volumes published ==
=== General volumes ===
- A History of the County of Gloucester: Volume 2. William Page (editor) (1907). The first volume was a part-volume covering the religious houses of the county, including the early history of Gloucester Cathedral, and local industries. Following publication, the Victoria County History project for Gloucestershire lay dormant for nearly 50 years.

=== Topographical volumes ===
- A History of the County of Gloucester: Volume 4. The City of Gloucester. N M Herbert (editor) (1988). The volume takes both a chronological and a thematic approach to the history of the city from before the Norman Conquest to the twentieth century.
- A History of the County of Gloucester: Volume 5. Bledisloe Hundred, St. Briavels Hundred, The Forest of Dean. C R J Currie, N M Herbert (editors); A P Baggs, A R J Jurica (1996). This volume covers a complex area of west Gloucestershire, with a core of formerly extra-parochial, royal demesne land of the Forest of Dean and a periphery of 14 parishes, including Lydney and Mitcheldean.
- A History of the County of Gloucester: volume 6. The history of the parishes of Slaughter hundred, and the upper divisions of Tewkesbury and Westminster hundreds, all in the eastern part of the county. C R Elrington (editor) (1965). The volume includes accounts of the parishes of Bourton-on-the-Water and Stow-on-the-Wold.
- A History of the County of Gloucester: volume 7. Covers the Churn, Coln and Leach Valleys.
- A History of the County of Gloucester: volume 8. Histories of the parishes of the hundreds of Cleeve, Deerhurst and Tibblestone, and the lower divisions of the hundreds of Tewkesbury and Westminster. C R Elrington (editor) (1968). The volume includes an account of the borough of Tewkesbury.
- A History of the County of Gloucester: volume 9. Bradley hundred. The Northleach area of the Cotswolds. N M Herbert (general editor); Carol Davidson Cragoe, A R J Jurica; Elizabeth Williamson (2001). Covers the sixteen parishes of Bradley hundred, to the east of the county.
- A History of the County of Gloucester: Volume 10. Westbury and Whitstone Hundreds. C R Elrington, N M Herbert, R B Pugh (editors), Kathleen Morgan, Brian S Smith (1972). The history of the six parishes in Westbury hundred and the sixteen in Whitstone hundred. Both hundreds abut the River Severn.
- A History of the County of Gloucester: Volume 11. Bisley and Longtree Hundreds. N M Herbert, R B Pugh (editors), A P Baggs, A R J Jurica, W J Sheils (1976). Covers the 18 parishes of the Cotswold hundreds of Bisley and Longtree and includes the market towns of Stroud, Tetbury, Painswick, and Minchinhampton.
- A History of the County of Gloucester: Volume 12 Newent and May Hill. A R J Jurica (editor) (2010). This volume covers the part of north-west Gloucestershire extending from the foothills of the Malverns in the north to the distinctive feature of May Hill in the south. Centred on the parish and former market town of Newent, it also covers the ancient parishes of Bromesberrow, Dymock, Huntley, Kempley, Longhope, Oxenhall, Pauntley, Preston, and Taynton.
- A History of the County of Gloucester: Volume 13 Vale of Gloucester and Leadon Valley. J.H. Chandler & A.R.J. Jurica (editors). This volume covers thirteen ancient parishes alongside the River Severn near Gloucester or its tributary, the Leadon. Ten form a contiguous block north and west of Gloucester, extending from Upleadon to Sandhurst; two more, Minsterworth and Elmore, lie on opposite banks of the Severn below Gloucester. The volume also includes Twyning, a parish near Tewkesbury bordering Worcestershire.

== Topographical volumes in preparation ==
Three volumes are in progress.

- Volume 14: The history of Yate, north of Bristol, has been completed and published as a VCH Short. The histories of Chipping Sodbury, Little Sodbury and Old Sodbury have been completed and are available online. Work continues to complete the remaining villages in the volume.
- Volume 15: The early history of Cheltenham has been published as a VCH Short, while an account of the town's history since it became a Spa is available online. Work is currently underway on Leckhampton, Swindon Village and Up Hatherley.
- Volume 16: Drafts of the prehistory of the area, Cirencester, Bagendon, Baunton, Daglingworth and Stratton are available on line. Work on the Duntisbournes is ongoing, while Coates and Preston will start in 2022.

== The Gloucestershire County History Trust ==
This trust, established in May 2010, is a UK-registered charity. It became a CIO in 2019. It is responsible for raising funds for the continuation of the county history.

== See also ==
- History of Gloucestershire
- List of places in Gloucestershire
- Bristol and Gloucestershire Archaeological Society
