= History of Wiltshire =

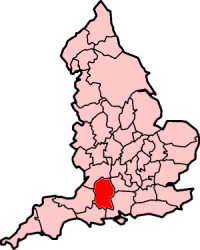
Ancient extent of Wiltshire

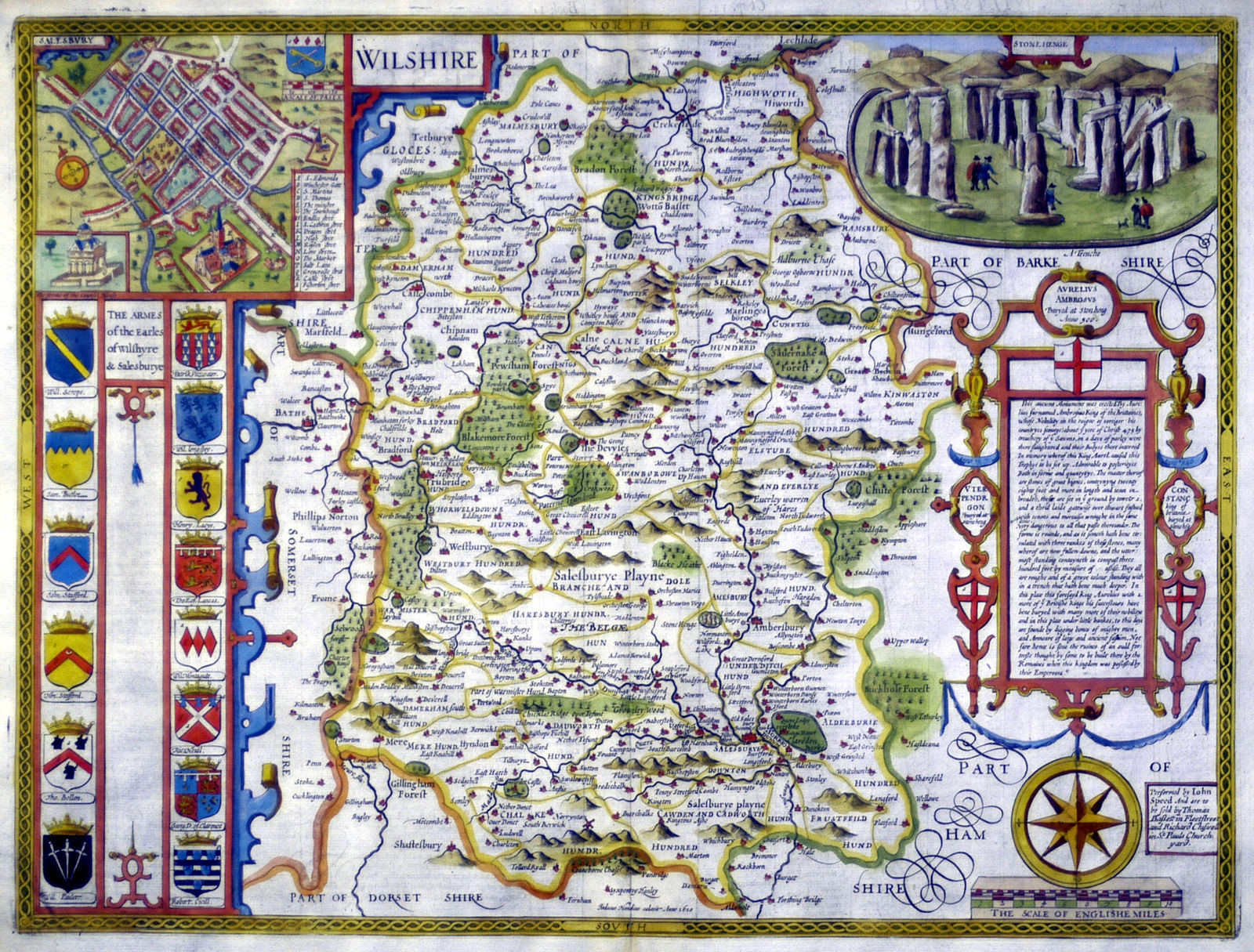
Wiltshire by John Speed, 1611

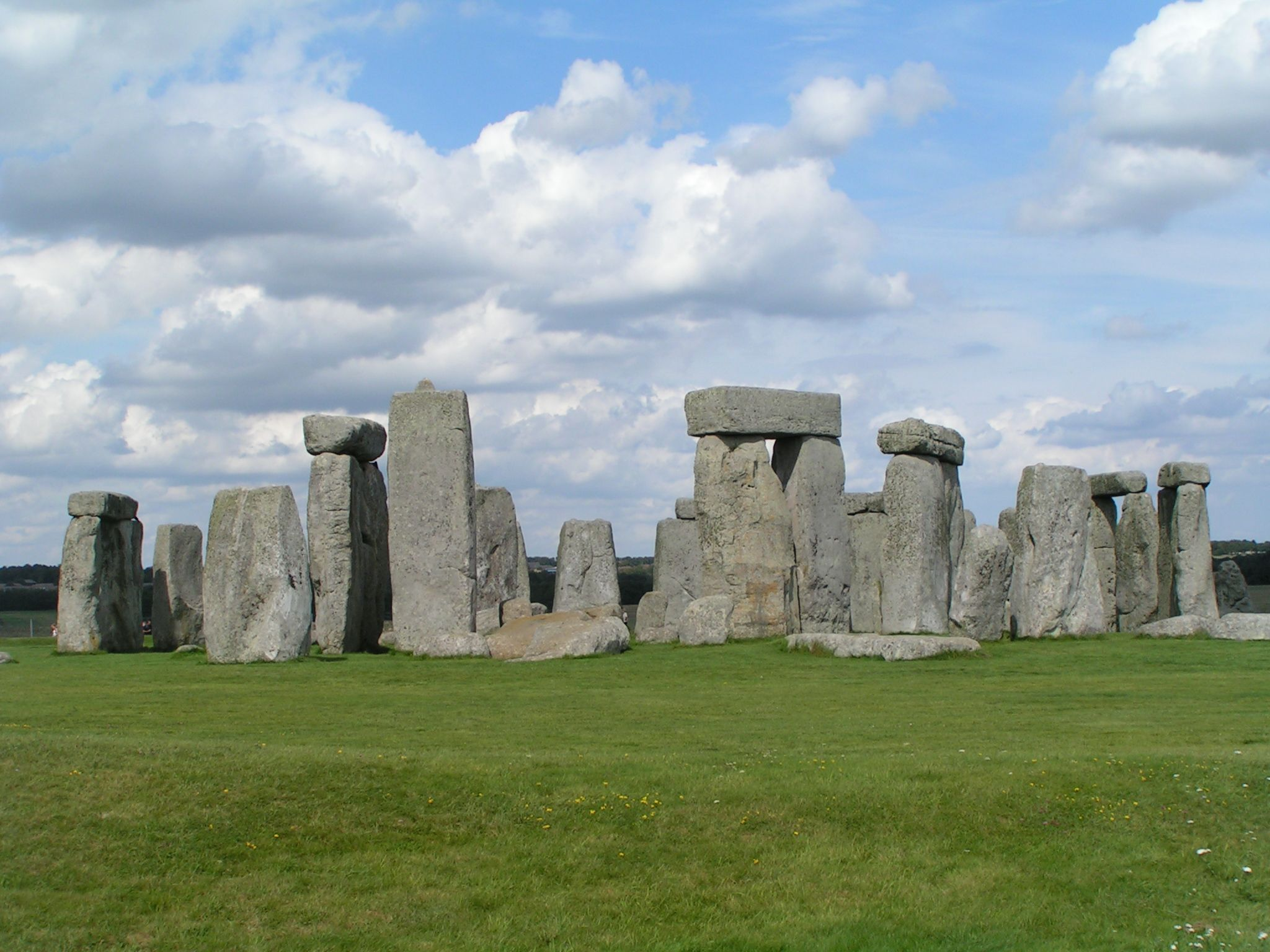
Neolithic Stonehenge

Wiltshire is a historic county located in the South West England region. Wiltshire is landlocked and is in the east of the region.

== Medieval history ==
The English conquest of the district now known as Wiltshire began in 552 AD with the victory of Saxon Cynric over the native Britons at Old Sarum, by which the way was opened to Salisbury Plain. Four years later, pushing his way through the Vale of Pewsey, Cynric extended the limits of the West Saxon kingdom to the Marlborough Downs by a victory at Barbury Hill. At that period the district south of the River Avon and the River Nadder was occupied by dense woodland, the relics of which survive in Cranborne Chase, and the first wave of West Saxon colonisation was chiefly confined to the valleys of the River Avon and the River Wylye. The little township of Wilton which arose in the latter valley gave the name of Wilsætan to the new settlers.

By the 9th century the district had acquired a definite administrative and territorial organization. Weohstan, ealdorman of the Wilsætan, was mentioned as early as 800/802 as repelling an attempted invasion by the Mercians. Moreover, Wiltunshire is mentioned by Asser in 878, in which year the Danes established their headquarters at Chippenham and remained there a year, plundering the surrounding country. In the time of Athelstan there were mints at Old Sarum, Malmesbury, Wilton, Cricklade and Marlborough. Wilton and Salisbury were destroyed by the Danish invaders under Sweyn I of Denmark in 1003, and in 1015 the district was harried by Canute.

== Land ownership after the Norman Conquest ==
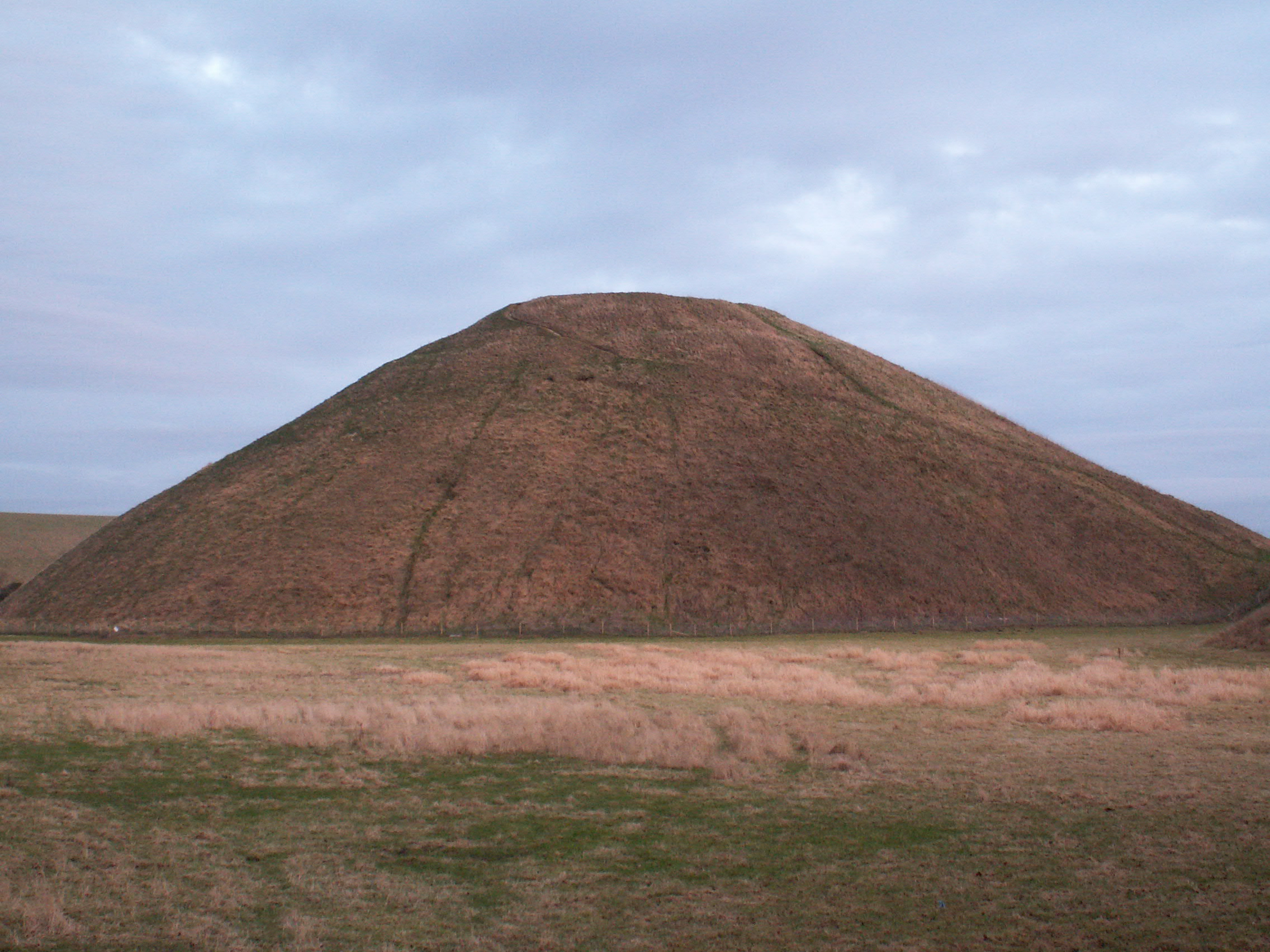
Silbury Hill

With the redistribution of estates after the Norman Conquest more than two-fifths of the county fell into the hands of the church; the possessions of the Crown covered one-fifth; while among the chief lay proprietors were Edward of Salisbury, William, Count of Eu, Ralf de Mortimer, Aubrey de Vere II, Robert Fitzgerald, Miles Crispin, Robert d'Oily and Osbern Giffard. The first Earl of Wiltshire after the Conquest was William le Scrope, who received the honour in 1397. The title subsequently passed to Sir James Butler in 1449, Sir John Stafford in 1470, Thomas Boleyn in 1529, and in 1550 to the Paulet family.

The Benedictine foundations at Wilton, Malmesbury and Amesbury existed before the Conquest; the Augustinian Bradenstoke Priory was founded by Walter d'Évreux in 1142; that at Lacock by Ela, countess of Salisbury, in 1232; that at Longleat by Sir John Vernon before 1272. The Cluniac priory of Monkton Farleigh was founded by Humphrey II de Bohun in 1125; the Cistercian house at Kingswood, Gloucestershire by William de Berkeley in 1139; and that of Stanley by the Empress Matilda in 1154.

== Wiltshire's hundreds ==
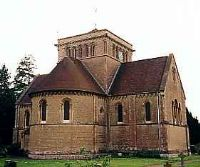
Dilton Marsh church

Of the forty Wiltshire hundreds mentioned in the Domesday Survey, Selkley, Ramsbury, Bradford, Melksham, Calne, Whorwellsdown, Westbury, Warminster, Heytesbury, Kinwardstone, Ambresbury, Underditch, Furstfield, Alderbury and Downton remain to the present day practically unaltered in name and extent; Thorngrave, Dunelawe and Cepeham hundreds form the modern hundred of Chippenham; Malmesbury hundred represents the parishes that were within the Domesday hundreds of Cicemethorn and Sterchelee, which were held at farm by the Abbot of Malmesbury; Highworth represents the Domesday hundreds of Crechelade, Scipe, Wurde and Staple; Kingbridge the hundreds of Chingbridge, Blachegrave and Thornhylle; Swanborough the hundreds of Rugeberge, Stodfold and Swaneberg; Branch the hundreds of Branchesberge and Dolesfeld; Cawden the hundreds of Cawdon and Cadworth.

A noticeable feature in the 14th century is the aggregation of church manors into distinct hundreds, at the court of which their ecclesiastical owners required their tenants to do suit and service. Thus the bishop of Winchester had a separate hundred called Kurwel Bishop, afterwards absorbed in Downton hundred; the abbot of Damerham had that of Damerham; and the prior of St. Swithins that of Elstub, under each of which were included manors situated in other parts of the county.

== Ancient moot places and meeting points ==
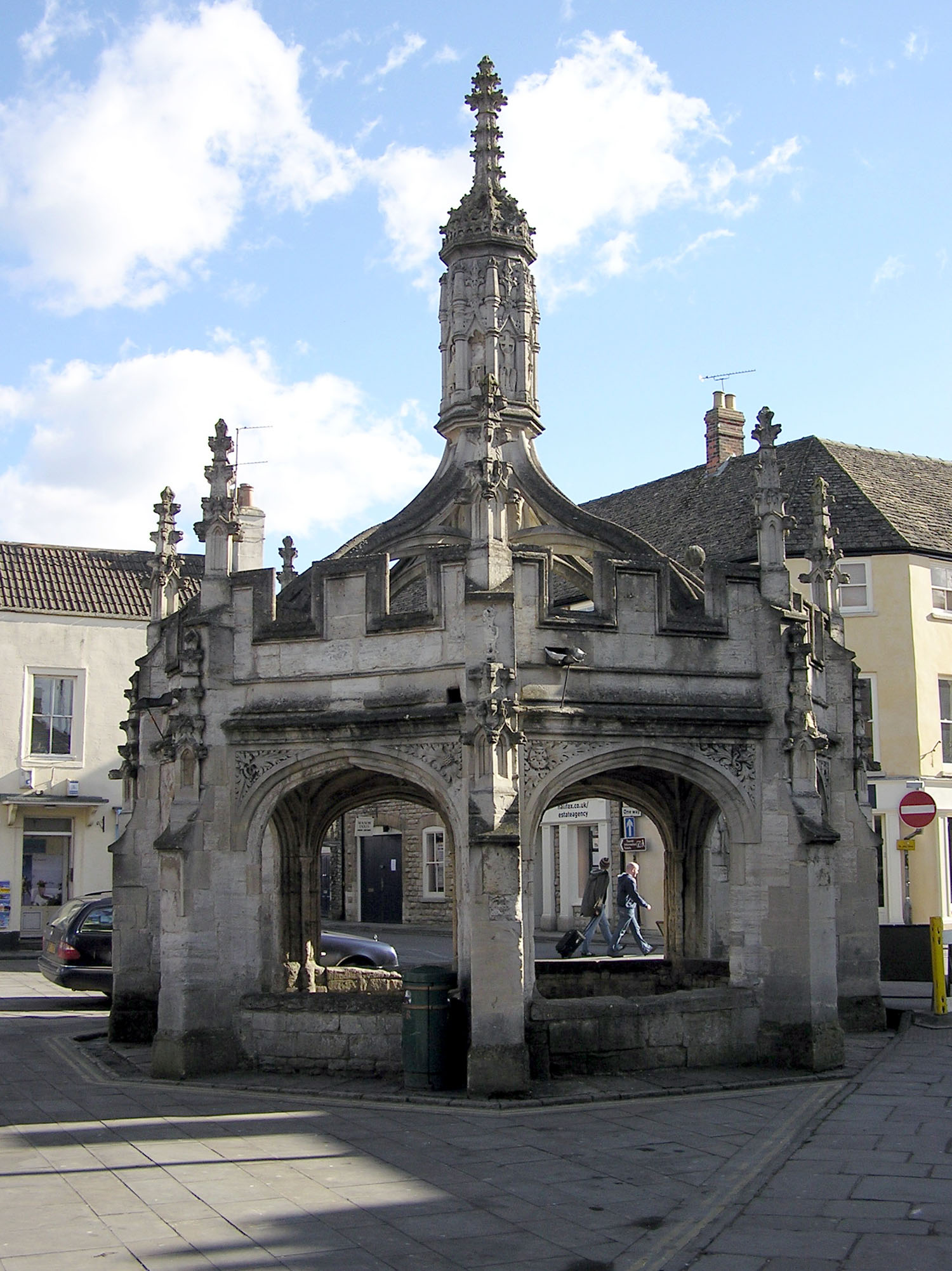
Malmesbury Market Cross

The meeting-place (or moot) of Swanborough Hundred was at Swanborough Tump, a hillock in the parish of Manningford Abbots identified as the moot-place mentioned in the will of King Alfred; that of Malmesbury was at Colepark; that of Bradford-upon-Avon at Bradford Leigh; that of Warminster at Iley Oak, about three kilometres (1.9 miles) south of Warminster, near Southleigh Wood. The shire court for Wiltshire was held at Wilton, and until 1446 the shrievalty was enjoyed ex officio by the castellans of Old Sarum. Edward of Salisbury was sheriff at the time of the Domesday Survey, and the office remained hereditary in his family, descending to William Longespee by his marriage with Ela, great-granddaughter of Edward. In the 13th century the assizes were held at Wilton, Malmesbury and New Sarum (Salisbury).

== Religious administrative areas ==
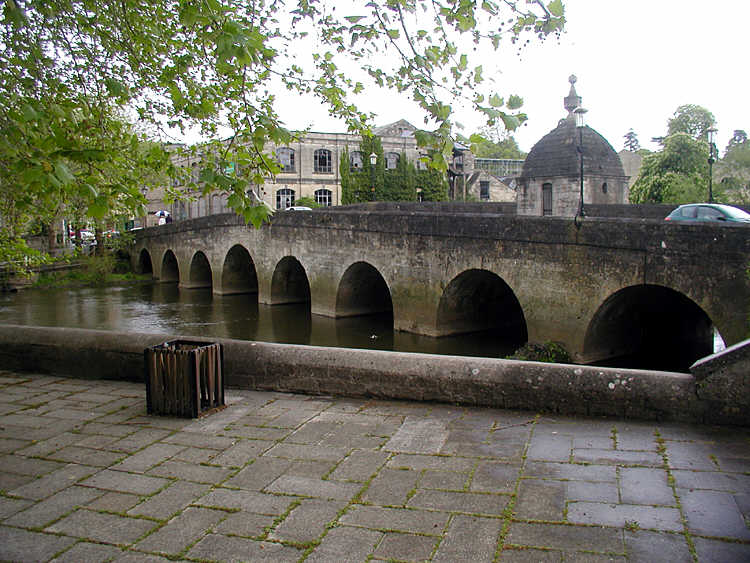
Bradford on Avon bridge

On the division of the West Saxon see in 703, Wiltshire was included in the diocese of Sherborne, but in 905 a separate diocese of Ramsbury was founded, the see being fixed alternately at Ramsbury, Wilton and Sonning in Berkshire. Shortly before the Conquest, Ramsbury was reunited to the Sherborne diocese, and the see was transferred to Salisbury. The archdeaconries of Wiltshire and Salisbury are mentioned in 1180; in 1291 the former included the deaneries of Avebury, Malmesbury, Marlborough and Cricklade within this county, and the latter the deaneries of Amesbury, Potterne, Wilton, Chalke and Wylye. In 1535 the archdeaconry of Salisbury included the additional deanery of Salisbury, while Potterne deanery had been transferred to the archdeaconry of Wiltshire. The deaneries of the archdeaconry of Salisbury have remained unaltered; Wiltshire archdeaconry now includes the deaneries of Avebury, Marlborough and Potterne; and the deaneries of Chippenham, Cricklade and Malmesbury form part of the archdeaconry and diocese of Bristol.

== Early political history ==
Wiltshire has traditionally been a peaceful county, with little impact on national political history. In 1086, after the completion of the Domesday Survey, Salisbury was the scene of a great council, in which all the landholders took oaths of allegiance to the king. A council for the same purpose assembled at Salisbury in 1116. Nearby at Clarendon, the assize which remodelled the provincial administration of justice was drawn up in 1166. Parliaments were held at Marlborough in 1267 and at Salisbury in 1328 and 1384.

During the wars of Stephen's reign, Salisbury, Devizes and Malmesbury were garrisoned by Roger, Bishop of Salisbury, for the Empress, but in 1138 Stephen seized the bishop and captured Devizes Castle. In 1216, Marlborough Castle was surrendered to Louis by Hugh de Neville. Hubert de Burgh escaped in 1233 from Devizes Castle, where he had been imprisoned in the previous year.

== The Civil War ==
In the Civil War of the 17th century, Wiltshire actively supported the parliamentary cause, displaying a spirit of violent anti-Catholicism. The efforts of the Marquess of Hertford and of Lord Seymour to raise a party for the king met with vigorous resistance from the inhabitants. However, the Royalists made some progress in the early stage of the struggle against the Roundheads, with Marlborough being captured for the king in 1642, while in 1643 the forces of the Earl of Essex were routed by Charles I and Prince Rupert at the Battle of Aldbourne Chase. In the same year Sir William Waller, after failing to capture Devizes, was defeated in the Battle of Roundway Down nearby.

In 1645, the Clubmen of Dorset and Wiltshire, whose sole object was peace, systematically punished any member of either party discovered in acts of plunder. Devizes, the last stronghold of the Royalists, was captured by Oliver Cromwell in 1645. In 1655, a rising organised on behalf of the exiled Charles II at Salisbury was dispersed in the same year.

== The Glorious Revolution ==
At the time of the Glorious Revolution, King James II gathered his main forces, altogether about 19,000 men, at Salisbury, James himself arriving there on 19 November 1688. His troops were not keen to fight William and Mary, and the loyalty of many was in doubt. The first blood was shed at the Wincanton Skirmish in Somerset. In Salisbury, James heard that some of his officers, such as Edward Hyde, had deserted, and he broke out in a nose-bleed which he took as a bad omen. His commander in chief, the Earl of Feversham, advised retreat on 23 November, and the next day John Churchill deserted to William. On 26 November, James's daughter Princess Anne did the same, and James returned to London the same day, never again to be at the head of a serious military force in England.

== Employment, manufacturing and industry ==
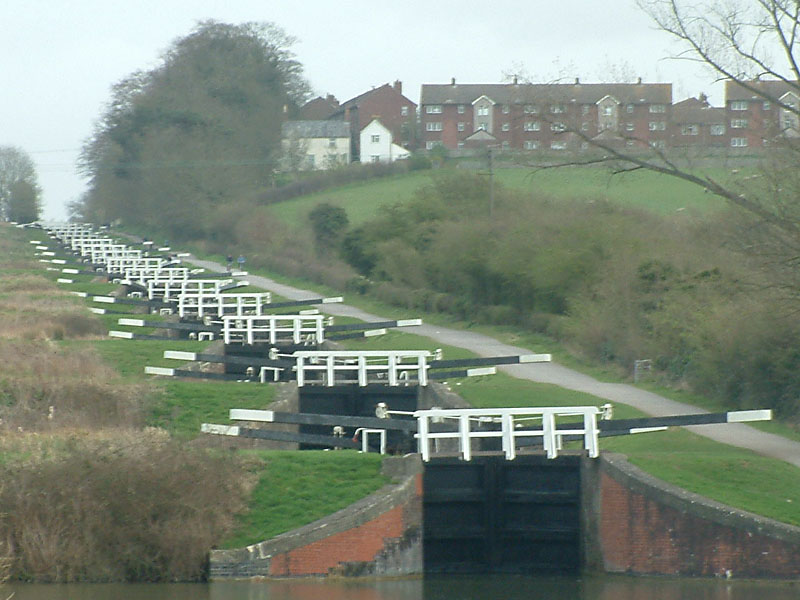
Caen Hill Locks

At the time of the Domesday Survey the industrial pursuits of Wiltshire were almost exclusively agricultural; 390 mills are mentioned, and vineyards at Tollard Royal and Lacock. In the succeeding centuries sheep farming was vigorously pursued, and the Cistercian monastery of both Kingswood and Stanley exported wool to the Florentine and Flemish markets in the 13th century and 14th century. Wiltshire at this time was already reckoned among the chief of the clothing counties, the principal centres of the industry being Bradford-upon-Avon, Malmesbury, Trowbridge, Devizes and Chippenham.

In the 16th century Devizes was noted for its blankets, Warminster had a famous corn-market, and cheese was extensively made in north Wiltshire. Amesbury was famous for its tobacco pipe manufacture in the 16th century. The clothing trade went through a period of great depression in the 17th century, partly owing to the constant outbreaks of plague. Linen, cotton, gloves and cutlery were also manufactured in the county, silk at Malmesbury and carpets at Wilton.

The Swindon Works of the Great Western Railway (1841–1986) was one of the largest covered areas in the world, and its remains are amongst the most significant of Victorian engineering works in the world. Together with the housing and amenities provided by the company and its workforce, it has been proposed to UNESCO as the centre of a World Heritage Site. Swindon has also been significant in other manufacturing, such as the car industry: see History of Swindon.

== Parliamentary representation ==
In 1295 Wiltshire was represented by twenty-eight members in Parliament: the shire returning two knights, and the boroughs of Bedwyn, Bradford, Calne, Chippenham, Cricklade, Devizes, Downton, Ludgershall, Malmesbury, Marlborough, Old Sarum, Salisbury and Wilton, two burgesses each, but the boroughs for the most part made irregular returns. Hindon, Heytesbury and Wootton Bassett were enfranchised in the 15th century, and at the time of the Reform Act 1832 the county with sixteen boroughs returned a total of thirty-four members. Under the latter act Great Bedwyn, Downton, Heytesbury, Hindon, Ludgershall, Old Sarum and Wootton Bassett were disfranchised, and Calne, Malmesbury, Westbury and Wilton lost one member each. Under the Boundary Act 1868 (31 & 32 Vict. c. 46) the county returned two members in two divisions, and Chippenham, Devizes and Marlborough lost one member each. Under the Redistribution of Seats Act 1885 the county returned five members in five divisions; Cricklade, Calne, Chippenham, Devizes, Malmesbury, Marlborough, Westbury and Wilton were disfranchised; and Salisbury lost one member.

== Archaeology ==
=== Prehistoric remains and monuments ===
Wiltshire is rich in prehistoric antiquities. The Stone Age is represented by a number of flint and stone implements, preserved in the unsurpassed collection at Salisbury Museum. Stonehenge, with its circles of giant stones, and Avebury, with its avenues of monoliths leading to what was once a stone circle, surrounded by an earthwork and enclosing two lesser circles, are the largest and best known megalithic works in England.

A valley near Avebury is filled with immense sarsen blocks, resembling a 'river of stone', and perhaps laid there by prehistoric architects. There are also menhirs, dolmens and cromlechs. Surrounded as they were by forests and marshy hollows, it is clear that the downs were densely peopled at a very early period. Circles, formed by a ditch within a bank, are common, as are grave-mounds or barrows. These have been classified according to their shape as bell barrows, bowl barrows and long barrows. Bones, ash, tools, weapons and ornaments have been dug up from such mounds, many of which contain kistvaens or chambers of stone. The lynchets or terraces which score some of the hillsides are said to be the work of primitive early farmers and agriculturists.

Ancient strongholds are scattered over the county. Among the most remarkable are Vespasian's Camp, near Amesbury; Silbury Hill, the largest artificial mound in Europe, near Avebury; the mounds of Marlborough and Old Sarum; the "camps" of Battlesbury and Scratchbury, near Warminster; Yarnbury, to the north of Wylye, in good preservation; Casterley, on a ridgeway near Devizes; White Sheet hill; Chisbury, near Savernake; Sidbury, near Ludgershall; and Figsbury Ring, northeast of Salisbury. Ogbury, ten kilometres (6.2 miles) north of Salisbury, is an undoubted British enclosure. Durrington Walls, north of Amesbury, are probably the remains of a British village, and there are vestiges of others on Salisbury Plain and the Marlborough Downs.

=== Roman remains ===
There are many signs of Roman rule. Wansdyke or Wodens Dyke, one of the largest extant entrenchments, runs west for about 100 kilometres (60 mi) from a point east of Savernake, nearly as far as the Bristol Channel, and is almost unaltered for several kilometres along the Marlborough Downs. Its date is uncertain; but the work has been proved, wherever excavated, to be Roman or Romano-British. It consists of a bank, with a trench on the north side, and was clearly meant for defence, not as a boundary. Forts strengthened it at intervals. Bokerley Dyke, which forms a part of the boundary between Wiltshire and Dorset, is the largest among several similar entrenchments, and has also a ditch north of the rampart.

=== Recent excavations ===
In April 2022, metal detectorists announced the discovery of two 4000 year-old Bronze Age axe heads on land owned by a farmer. The remains are being stored in Bristol Museum.

== Architecture ==
=== Ecclesiastical buildings ===
==== Monastic houses ====
Chief among the few monastic buildings of which any vestiges remain are the ruined abbeys of Malmesbury (still in use as the parish church) and of Lacock. Amesbury's Church of St Mary and St Melor may have been linked to the 10th-century Amesbury Priory or its 12th-century successor, Amesbury Abbey. Monkton Farleigh had its Cluniac priory, founded as a cell of Lewes in the 13th century, and represented by some outbuildings of the manor house. A college for a dean and 12 prebendaries, afterwards a monastery of Bonhommes, was founded in 1347 at Edington; the church, Decorated and Perpendicular, resembles a cathedral in size and stately beauty and is now the parish church. The 14th-century buildings of Bradenstoke Priory or Clack Abbey, founded near Chippenham for Augustinian canons, were incorporated in a farmhouse.

==== Notable churches ====
The finest churches of Wiltshire, generally Perpendicular in style, were built in the districts where good stone could be obtained, while the architecture is simpler in the chalk region where flint was used. Small wooden steeples and pyramidal bell-turrets are not uncommon; and the churches of Purton, five kilometres (3 1/8 mi) northwest of Swindon, and Wanborough, five kilometres (3.1 miles) southeast, are unusual in having a central steeple as well as a west tower.

St. Lawrence's church at Bradford on Avon is one of the most complete Saxon ecclesiastical buildings in England; and elsewhere there are fragments of Saxon work imbedded in later masonry. Examples are three arches in the nave of Britford church, within a mile of Salisbury; the east end of the chancel at Burcombe, near Wilton; and parts of the churches at Avebury, Bremhill, and Manningford Bruce. St John's at Devizes retains its original Norman tower and has Norman masonry in its chancel; while the chancel of St Mary in the same town, is also Norman, and the porch has characteristic Norman stone mouldings. The churches of Preshute, Ditteridge and Netheravon also preserve some Norman features.

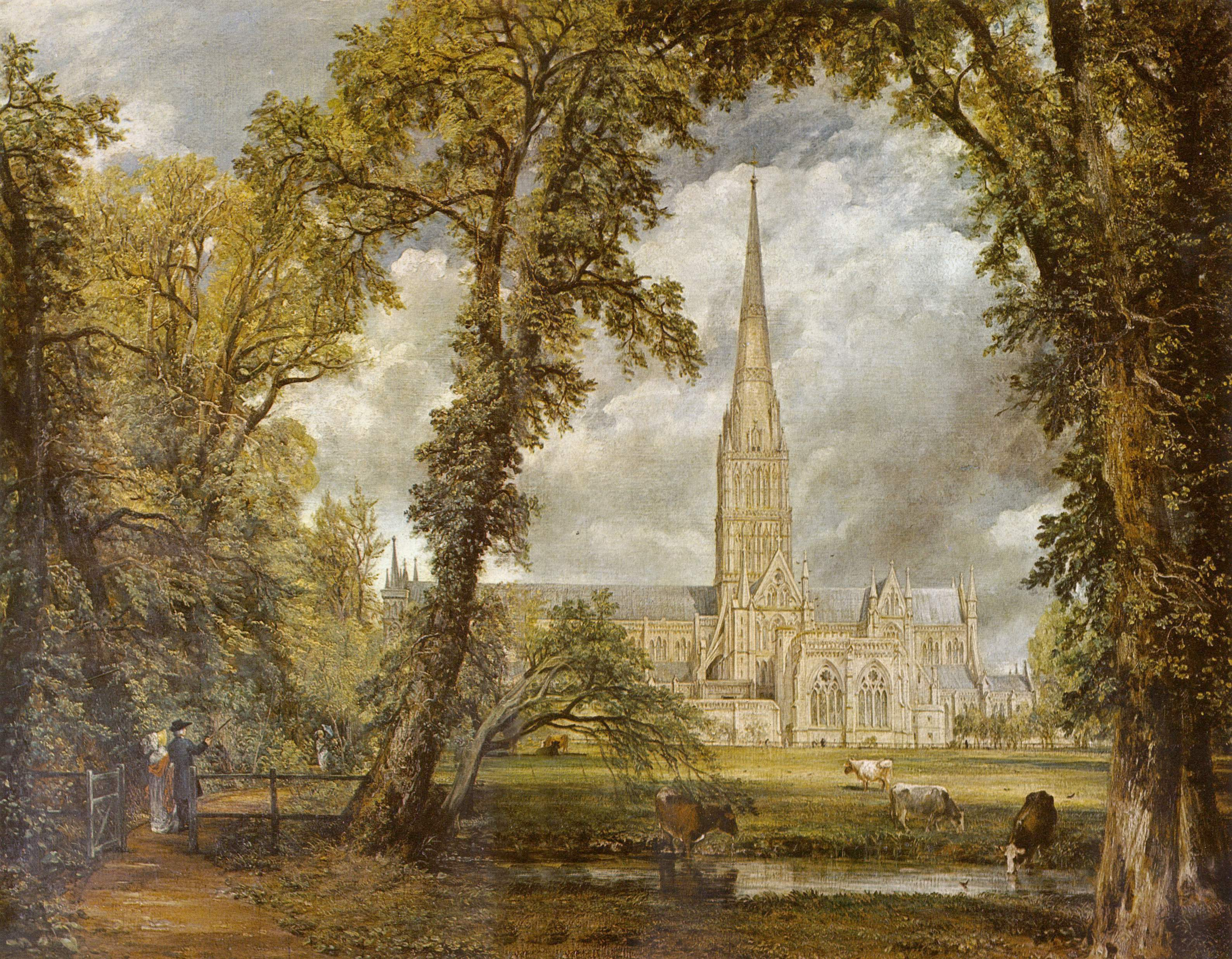
Salisbury Cathedral by John Constable

Early English architecture is illustrated by Salisbury Cathedral and, on a smaller scale, at Amesbury, Bishops Cannings, Boyton, Collingbourne Kingston, Downton and Potterne.

Mere, close to the borders of Dorset and Somerset, has a medieval chantry, used as a schoolhouse by William Barnes, the Dorset poet.

=== Secular architecture ===
==== Castles ====
The castles of Wiltshire have been almost entirely swept away. At Old Sarum, Marlborough and Devizes only a few vestiges are left in remnant walls and vaults. Castle Combe and Trowbridge castles have long been demolished, and of Ludgershall castle only a small fragment survives. The ruins of Wardour castle, standing in a richly wooded park near Tisbury, date from the 14th century, and consist of a hexagonal outer wall of great height, enclosing an open court; two towers overlook the entrance.

==== Manor houses ====
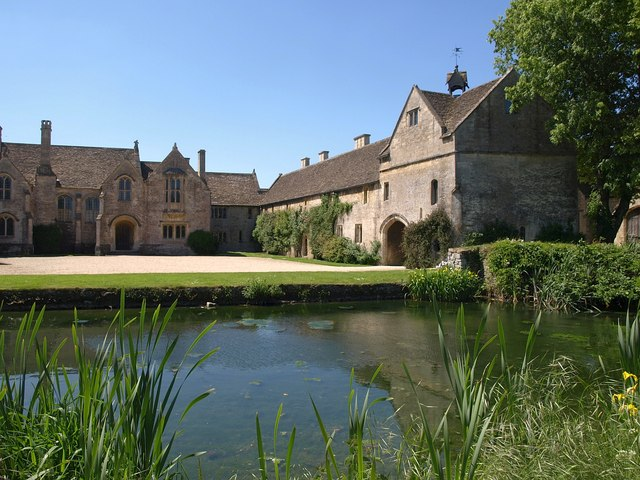
Great Chafield Manor

The number of mansions, old country houses and stately homes is a marked feature in Wiltshire. Few parishes, especially in the north west of the county, are without their old manor house, usually converted into a farm, but preserving its flagged floor, stone-mullioned windows, gabled front, sometimes two-storeyed porch and oak-panelled interior. Place House in Tisbury, and Barton Farm, at Bradford-upon-Avon, date from the 14th century. The best examples of 15th-century work are the manor houses of Norrington, in the vale of Chalk; Teffont Evias, in the vale of the River Nadder; Potterne; and Great Chalfield, near Monkton Farleigh. At South Wraxall the hall of a house of the same period is said in local tradition to be the spot where tobacco was first smoked in England by Sir Walter Raleigh and his host, Sir Walter Long.

Later styles are represented by Longford Castle, near Salisbury, where the picture galleries are of great interest; Heytesbury House; Wilton House at Wilton, Kingston House at Bradford-upon-Avon, Bowood House near Calne, Longleat near Warminster, Corsham Court at Corsham, Littlecote near Ramsbury, Charlton Park House near Malmesbury, Compton Chamberlayne in the Nadder valley, Grittleton House and the modern Castle Combe, both near Chippenham, and Stourhead, on the borders of Dorset and Somerset. Each of these is noteworthy for its architecture, its art treasures, the care lavished upon it or the beauty of its surroundings.

== See also ==
- History of England
- Wiltshire Victoria County History
- Wiltshire Record Society
- Wiltshire and Swindon History Centre
