= Epes =

Epes may refer to:

== People ==
Given name

- Epes Randolph (1856–1921), American civil engineer
- Epes Sargent (poet) (1813–1880), American writer and editor
- Epes Sargent (soldier) (1690–1762), American soldier and landowner
- Epes W. Sargent (1872–1938), American vaudeville critic

Surname

- James F. Epes (1842–1910), American politician
- Louis S. Epes (1882–1935), American lawyer, judge and politician
- Maria Epes (born 1950), American artist
- Sidney Parham Epes (1865–1900), American politician

== Places ==
- Epes, Alabama, United States

== See also ==
- EPE (disambiguation)
