= Wiltshire and Swindon History Centre =

Archive and county record office for Wiltshire, England

Coordinates: 51.4640°N 2.1093°W

Wiltshire and Swindon History Centre, 2007

The Wiltshire and Swindon History Centre in Chippenham, Wiltshire, England, serves as a focal point for heritage services relating to Wiltshire and Swindon. The centre opened in 2007 and is funded by Wiltshire Council and Swindon Borough Council. It has purpose-built archive storage and research facilities and incorporates the local studies library, archaeology service, Wiltshire Buildings Record and the conservation and museums advisory service.

== History ==
Existing accommodation for the Wiltshire and Swindon Record Office, in a former mattress factory in Trowbridge, had been declared sub-standard by the Royal Commission on Historical Manuscripts in 1998. Wiltshire County Council and Swindon Borough Council took the opportunity not only to build a new record repository which would meet the British Standard for Archive Repositories (BS5454), but also to create a centre for Wiltshire and Swindon history. The centre preserves the collections of the Wiltshire and Swindon Archives Service, County Local Studies Library, Wiltshire Archaeological Service, Wiltshire Conservation and Museum Services and the Wiltshire Buildings Record. These services were previously at Trowbridge and Salisbury.

The previous poor accommodation for the services had disadvantaged users and restricted use of services. The new facility was designed to substantially improve access, both for visitors to the centre and those using services at a distance. An education room has been included for use by schools and colleges and for training as well as a workshop to produce displays.

After two unsuccessful bids to the Heritage Lottery Fund, Wiltshire County Council and Swindon Borough Council decided in spring 2004 to bear the whole cost themselves. In March 2005, Cowlins of Bristol were selected as the Design and Build contractors. This was announced at the WCC Cabinet on 18 March; that meeting also confirmed that the name of the new facility was to be "The Wiltshire and Swindon History Centre". Cowlins started work on 28 June and the roof was topped out on 6 December 2005. The building is a concrete and glass construction, covering 4,000 square metres on two floors (approximately the same area as five football pitches). It conforms to BS 5454 and has been praised as a "state of the art" building by Nicholas Kingsley, Head of the National Advisory Service, The National Archives. The building was completed in October 2006 and handed over to both councils on 29 January 2007. After eighteen months of planning, each service moved from their former site to the new centre in Chippenham between February and October 2007. In the case of the archive service, this involved moving over 30,000 boxes of archival material.

== Archaeology service ==
The Wiltshire Archaeological Service was established in 1975 with the appointment of a County Archaeologist. It was based in Chapman's Building, Trowbridge. Initially, the role of the Service was to carry out excavations on development sites in Wiltshire. In the late 1970s it became apparent that there was demand for information on archaeology in the form of enquiries from planners, highways engineers and developers and a decision was made to establish the Sites and Monuments Record (SMR). Complete coverage of the county was achieved in 1981. The recording and giving of advice is currently the primary role of the Service and excavations are now principally carried out by other agencies. As discoveries occur the record has grown at about 5% per annum. Advice has been supplied to County and District Planning Officers since 1980, and in 1984 links were formed with the Ministry of Defence as a result of its substantial holdings in Wiltshire. The service has benefited substantially from English Heritage grant aid, particularly in developing databases for the Avebury and Stonehenge World Heritage Sites.

== Archive service ==
The Wiltshire and Swindon Archives Service cares for and gives access to the archival heritage of the county and borough. It was established in 1947 and now holds over seven miles of archives, representing over 3,000 organisations and millions of individuals and their history, stretching back to Norman times. Initially based in County Hall, it transferred to Chapman's Building, Bythesea Road, Trowbridge, in the 1970s. That building was confirmed sub-standard by the Royal Commission on Historical Manuscripts in 1998. The service was called the Wiltshire Record Office until 1997 and thereafter the Wiltshire and Swindon Record Office, but in 2006 the broader title of Wiltshire and Swindon Archives was adopted. The aim of the Archives Service is to collect, preserve and give access to the historic archives of the County and Borough.

The archives of the Wiltshire and Swindon Archives Service fall into three categories: official, ecclesiastical and private. Over 3,000 organisations are represented in the archive. For an area that until comparatively recently had a small and largely agricultural population, the quantity of surviving records (over 850 cubic metres) is impressive.

There are five groups of archives in the Wiltshire and Swindon Archives Service that are of pre-eminent, regional or national importance: the political papers of Walter Long MP, 1854–1924; the British Rail Western Region, (formerly Great Western Railway), archives which are still growing; the archives of the West Wiltshire firms of cloth manufacturers; the Diocesan probate collection (also known as the Wiltshire Wills collection); and a collection of archive films and videos.

== Wiltshire Buildings Record ==
The Wiltshire Buildings Record was set up in 1979 to fill a perceived gap, not provided for by any other Wiltshire organisations, in recording threatened buildings within the county. The Wiltshire Buildings Record has ties with other specialised bodies, including representatives from archaeology, museums, local history, archives, planning and architecture. Much of the record consists of photographic items that merit controlled storage. It was previously based in Chapman's Building which had no such facilities. It keeps the record of statutory listed buildings within the county and provides access to the listing.

Wiltshire Buildings Record has created a database of more than 13,000 sites throughout the county, thus preserving information on buildings which have since been lost, and helping to protect those which have come under threat. It creates and maintains an index of dateable building features and building types, which provides information for architectural research. It has a collection of 118 items from buildings within the county, to ensure their preservation for future study and comparison.

== Conservation and museums advisory service ==
The Wiltshire County Council Object Conservation Service was based at Wyndham House in Salisbury from 1980 to 2007, and the Archive Conservation Service was formerly in Chapman's building, Trowbridge. The service was set up to provide conservation services to museums in Wiltshire as none of the museums had in-house conservation provision, and to ensure the preservation of the County Archive. The service provides specialist advice on all aspects of collections care, remedial conservation and training courses, and works with Southwest Museum Development.

== Local Studies Library – Wiltshire Studies ==
The Wiltshire County Council County Local Studies Library was formerly part of the Library Service and was based in Chapman's Building, Trowbridge. In 2007 the Local Studies Library was transferred to Heritage Services. It is a major resource for the study of Wiltshire's heritage, and provides advice to local history societies, research groups and individuals on both research and publication.

The aim of the library is to acquire, preserve and give access to publications related to Wiltshire. The collection of published Wiltshire material includes 18,000 monographs, 2,600 reels of microfilm including newspapers dating from 1736, 35,000 microfiches, over 40,000 photographs and 11,000 journals. The library collects, preserves and makes available for research all Wiltshire publications, including videos, CDs, tapes and CD-ROMS. Material on adjacent counties and extensive collections on archaeology, museology, family history, architecture and history are used by heritage officers as well as being used by the public.

== Victoria County History ==
The Wiltshire Victoria County History has its offices at the History Centre. It is part of the national Victoria County History project.

== Access to services ==
Wiltshire and Swindon History Centre is open to the public. Appointments are not compulsory but the staff can be informed in advance of a visit to make the most of the time available for research. The centre operates a computerised user registration system, so a form of identification including name and address is required. The centre is fully accessible to visitors with disabilities. The public areas are on ground level. Disabled parking and toilet facilities are provided. The centre is equipped with a hearing loop.

== See also ==
- Wiltshire Record Society
- List of museums in Wiltshire
- History of Wiltshire
- Category:History of Wiltshire
