= EPE =

Epe or EPE may refer to:

== Places ==
- Epe, Westphalia, Germany
- Epe, Netherlands
- Epe, Lagos, Nigeria
- Eastern Peripheral Expressway, National Capital Region, India

== Science ==
- Electric potential energy
- Elvis Presley Enterprises, an American entertainment company
- England's Past for Everyone, an English historical research project
- Ephenidine
- European Parliament of Enterprises, a business organization
- Everyday Practical Electronics, a British hobbyist magazine
- Expanded polyethylene
- Extrasolar Planets Encyclopaedia, an online database of exoplanets
- End-Permian Extinction, a mass extinction at the end of the Paleozoic

== See also ==
- Épée, a weapon used in sport fencing
- Treaty of Epe
