= Mepe (disambiguation) =

Mepe is a Georgian royal title used in the Caucasus

Mepe or MEPE may also refer to:

== Places ==
- Mepe, Ghana, a town in the Volta Region of Ghana
- Museu do Estado de Pernambuco (MEPE; Portuguese: Museum of the State of Pernambuco), Recife, Pernambuco, Brazil

== People ==
- Mepe Dada, an Indian politician elected in the 1990 Arunachal Pradesh Legislative Assembly election
- Irakli Charkviani (1961–2006), having the stagename "Mepe" (მეფე), Georgian artist

== Groups, companies, organizations ==
- Member of the European Parliament of Enterprises (MEPE)
- M.E.P.E. (Μ.Ε.Π.Ε.; Greek: Μονοπρόσωπη Εταιρεία Περιορισμένης Ευθύνης, romanized: Monoprósopi Etaireía Periorisménis Efthínis, lit. 'Sole Proprietorship Limited Liability Company'), see List of legal entity types by country
- Myanmar Electric Power Enterprise, part of the Ministry of Electric Power

== Other uses ==
- MEPE (matrix extracellular phosphoglycoprotein), a protein and gene
- mobile electronic personal enhancer, a fictional device found in Aqua Teen Hunger Force (season 1)

== See also ==
- MEP (disambiguation)
