= Wiltshire Archaeological and Natural History Magazine =

- Discipline: Archaeology, natural history
- Language: English
- Edited by: Dr Stuart Brookes

Publication details
- History: 1854–present
- Publisher: Wiltshire Archaeological and Natural History Society (United Kingdom)
- Frequency: Annual

Standard abbreviations
- ISO 4: Wilts. Archaeol. Nat. Hist. Mag.

Indexing
- ISSN: 0262-6608

Wiltshire Archaeological and Natural History Magazine is a county journal published by the Wiltshire Archaeological and Natural History Society (WANHS), based in Devizes, England. It has been published almost annually since 1854 and is distributed to the Society's members and subscribers, and exchanged with other linked societies.

From volume 65, published in 1970, WANHM was published in two parts, divided into sections on natural history and archaeology with the former printed and distributed to members earlier. For volumes 70 to 75, the WANHM was split into two titles, The Wiltshire Natural History Magazine and The Wiltshire Archaeological Magazine, and was recombined from volume 76 onwards.

== Online availability ==
The Biodiversity Heritage Library, in partnership with the Internet Archive and the Natural History Museum Library, London, has a near-complete set of scanned volumes. As of January 2021, the collection goes as far as volume 106 (2013).
