= Clubmen =

17th-century English militia group

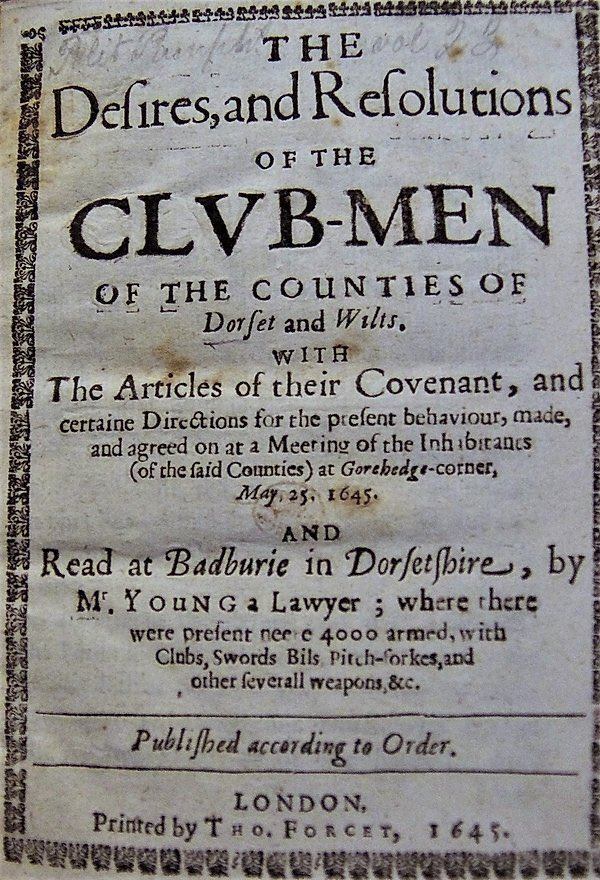
Title page of "The Desires and Resolutions of the Clubmen of the Counties of Dorset and Wiltshire", published by said Clubmen in 1645

Clubmen were bands of local defence vigilantes during the English Civil War (1642–1651) who tried to protect their localities against the excesses of the armies of both sides in the war. They sought to join together to prevent their wives and daughters being raped by soldiers of both sides, themselves being forcibly conscripted to fight by one side or the other, their crops and property being damaged or seized by the armies and their lives threatened or intimidated by soldiers, battle followers, looters, deserters or refugees. As their name suggests, they were mostly armed with cudgels, flails, scythes and sickles fastened to long poles. They were otherwise unarmed.

Initially Clubmen gatherings came together spontaneously in response to the actions of soldiers in their localities but as the war went on Clubmen in some areas were organised by the local gentry and churchmen and were a force which both sides in the war had to take into account when planning a campaign and garrisoning some areas, particularly in the south and west. The Clubmen, distinguishing themselves by white ribbands, were of a third party, neither Royalist nor Parliamentarian, and they were repressed severely by the authorities on both sides. Though Lord Fairfax met with Clubmen and negotiated with them, eventually he moved against them.

== Woodbury Declaration ==
Organised Clubmen in Worcestershire met on Woodbury Hill on 5 March 1645 and under the leadership of Charles Nott, the parson of Shelsley Beauchamp drew up the Woodbury Declaration, which protests at the "utter ruin by the outrages and violence of the soldier; threatening to fire our houses; endeavouring to ravish our wives and daughters, and menacing our persons", and presented it to Henry Bromley (of Holt), the Royalist Sheriff of Worcestershire.

== Dispersing the Clubmen ==
In theory, the Clubmen of Dorset and Wiltshire operated as a single group, but in practice they were divided, with the Clubmen from the Langport area explicitly dissociating themselves from other areas within the broad region. This division contributed to differing reactions to the arrival of the Parliamentarians and their New Model Army in mid-1645; the Langport Clubmen assisted the Parliamentarians, while the broader Dorset-Wiltshire Clubmen rose up against them.

Historian Ronald Hutton theorizes that the reason for the different reaction is due to their differing experiences within the war. The Langport Clubmen had only experienced occupation by the "underpaid and unruly royalists", while the Dorset-Wiltshire Clubmen had experienced occupation by both the Royalists and by the Parliamentarians.

In Dorset, on 2 August 1645, Colonel Charles Fleetwood surrounded and dispersed 1,000 Clubmen at Shaftesbury. Stiffer resistance was met by Oliver Cromwell in attacking a larger group in the ancient hillfort on Hambledon Hill. An hour's fighting killed 60 Clubmen and captured 400, half of whom were wounded. They were held in the church at Shroton. Parliamentarian sources claimed that they had been stirred up by "malignant priests", for vicars and curates were among the captives. Those who swore to the Covenant were subsequently released, the others sent to London.

== Failure of peace negotiations ==
As the Civil War continued, the Clubmen began to grow increasingly impatient with the lack of seriousness in the approach of both King and Parliament to signing any relevant or significant peace treaty. The longer the war continued, the more substantial the negative impact on local communities, via plundering and heavy taxation. A peace treaty was therefore highly sought after by ordinary people and so Parliament and Charles I's failure in establishing one only served to increase tension and give further motivations and aims to the Clubmen. These were demonstrated largely through physical demonstrations and print culture, particularly in pamphlets.

== See also ==
- Bunbury Agreement
- Cudgel War
