= Staffordshire Record Society =

Flag of Staffordshire

The Staffordshire Record Society is the record society for Staffordshire in England. It was originally formed in 1879 as the William Salt Archaeological Society based on the activities and collection of the antiquarian and banker William Salt. It changed its name to the Staffordshire Record Society in 1936.

As of December 2025, its website lists its most recent publication as "Fourth series Volume XXVII [2022] Local Histories: Essays in Honour of Nigel Tringham", the previous two volumes having been published in 2012 and 2018 respectively.
