= Christopher Elstub =

English cricketer (born 1981)

Christopher John Elstub (born 3 February 1981, Dewsbury, West Yorkshire, England) is an English first-class cricketer, who played six matches for Yorkshire County Cricket Club between 2000 and 2002, as a right-handed lower order batsman and right arm medium pacer. He scored a total of 28 runs, with his best an unbeaten 18, and with six not outs in seven innings, his average was quite high for a lower order batsman at 28.00 rpi (runs per innings.) He took nine wickets at 39.55 with a best of 3 for 37, plus two catches. In ten one day matches for Yorkshire and the Leeds/Bradford UCCE, he took 12 wickets at 24.16, with 4 for 25 his best performance.

After being released by Yorkshire, he played one Second XI game for Kent County Cricket Club in 2003, without taking a miss.

He is now a secondary school PE teacher in Cleckheaton, West Yorkshire at Whitcliffe Mount School.
