= Duntisbourne =

Duntisbourne is part of the name of three villages in Gloucestershire, England:

- Duntisbourne Abbots
- Duntisbourne Leer
- Duntisbourne Rouse
