= Clubmen of Dorset and Wiltshire =

Paramilitary unit during the English Civil War

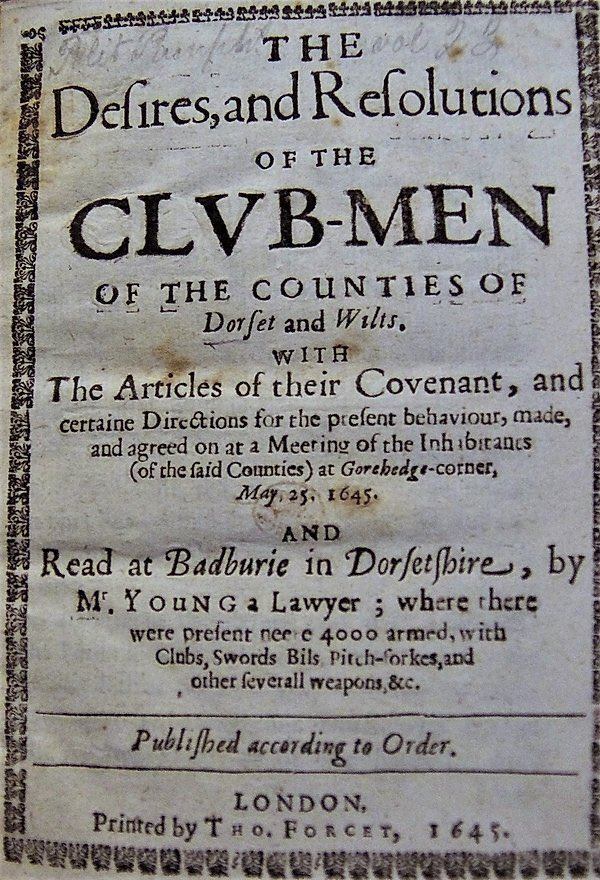
Title page of "The Desires and Resolutions of the Clubmen of the Counties of Dorset and Wiltshire", published by said Clubmen in 1645

The Clubmen of Dorset and Wiltshire were a paramilitary unit formed in late 1644 or early 1645, during the English Civil War, in the Dorset and Wiltshire region. As with other groups of Clubmen, they were formed for the purpose of self-protection from the deprivations of both the Parliamentarians and the Royalists, with their goal being the cessation of all hostilities.

== Background ==
By late summer of 1644, Royalist commanders were facing significant difficulties supplying and quartering their troops in the face of indifference and hostility from the local population. This local response was due to the arrival of Prince Rupert's troops from the north; while the local population had previously reluctant supported local garrisons, they were hostile to these strangers. This response was then exacerbated by the defeats suffered by the Royalists in the summer and the autumn of that year, as it triggered a further withdrawal of support from the local population who sought to bring about a quick end to the war and its deprivations.

Meanwhile, in the Midlands, local gentry proposed the forming of a "Western Association", an army in the form of a posse that could be levied to maintain order and ward off Parliamentarian attacks. This plan, having aroused little interest among the Western Gentry, was eventually dropped, with a likely cause being the changed military situation in favour of the Royalists in the region. However, it had aroused interest in the Marches, and a request to form an association there was issued.

This presented a danger to the Royalists; it would be funded through sources, such as sequestered estates, that previously funded their army, and it would enable the formation of a large body of men that could be turned against them. However, on 15 February 1644, Charles I granted the association permission to form, with Ronald Hutton theorizing that he considered the dangers of refusing it permission to form to be greater than the dangers of granting such permission, though some control over it was attempted by requiring the officers to be drawn from the Royalist Army.

== Formation in Dorset and Wiltshire ==
The authorized associations provided both the model and the impetus for the Clubmen, who formed, primarily in Dorset, Wiltshire, and Somerset, without authorization in the first outbreak of militant neutralism since 1643, and with the intent of preventing their homes from being battlegrounds, as well as in reaction to the demands of the Associations for universal conscription and higher taxation, neither of which the peasantry were in a position to bear.

== Decentralization ==
Despite the apparent broad nature of the Clubmen, in practice the groups operated in a decentralized manner; independently and on a local level. This is particularly seen with the Clubmen of Langport, who disassociated themselves from the Clubmen of Shepton Mallet and Wells (all three places in Somerset), despite all being within the region of Dorset and Wiltshire.

== Uprising ==
In mid-1645, with the First English Civil War drawing to a close, Parliamentarian Forces arrived in the West. The reaction to this varied by location, with some sub-groups such as the Langport Clubmen assisting them, but the broader Dorset-Wiltshire Clubmen rose up against them. The proposed reasons for this vary, with some, such as David Underdown arguing that this is related to geography; the Clubmen who were most friendly to the Royalists were from the "Chalk", the larger settlements in the region, while those most friendly to the Parliamentarians were from the "Cheese", the smaller farming settlements. Others, such as Ronald Hutton propose an alternative; that the difference is due to differing wartime experience, with the areas that had only experienced deprivation by the Royalists being most friendly to the Parliamentarians, while those who had experienced deprivation by both sides were in turn opposed to both.

In response, Colonel Charles Fleetwood was sent to disperse 1000 Clubmen in Shaftesbury, Dorset on 2 August 1645. Oliver Cromwell, meanwhile, moved against a larger group on Hambledon Hill, where 60 Clubmen were killed and 400 captured, though Cromwell wrote to Fairfax on 4 August that he had "I believe killed not twelve of them, but cut very many, 'and put them all to flight.' We have taken about 300". These actions, in concert with the end of the war, ended the operations of the Clubmen, although the greater discipline (and consequent lack of looting) by the New Model Army also lessened the demand.
