= Maria Epes =

American feminist artist (born 1950)

- Born: March 2, 1950 (age 76); Alexandria, Virginia
- Education: Cornell University
- Known for: Art
- Notable work: Biogender, Drawing Blood, End of the Line Design
- Website: mariaepes.com

Maria Epes is a feminist artist working in the media of artists' books, installation, sculpture, printmaking, and works on paper.

== Early life and education ==
Maria Epes has a BFA in printmaking from Cornell University and an MFA from California College of the Arts.

== Career ==
Maria Epes's work has been exhibited and cataloged internationally at venues including Franklin Furnace, La Mama La Galleria, and ABC No Rio. A long time member and solo exhibiting artist of Ceres Gallery, a feminist art collective in New York City, she also showed with Artemisia Gallery in Chicago, Illinois. She is represented in the Feminist Art Database, a curated selection of important feminist works in the Elizabeth A. Sackler Center for Feminist Art at the Brooklyn Museum.

Her work has been reviewed in publications including The Village Voice, and Ms. Magazine, and she has been in television spots featuring her artwork, including NBC News for their series, "The Guns of November." She produced a Tête-bêche book, Wimmin X 1 = Past, Present, Future + Future Perfect: 4 Installations/Wimmin X 1 = Birthrite, Liferite, Deathrite + Rebirthrite : 4 Installations/2 B with an introduction by Arlene Raven.
