= Ralph Pugh =

British historian and editor

Ralph Bernard Pugh
- Born: 1 August 1910
- Died: 3 December 1982 (aged 72)
- Education: St Paul's School, London
- Alma mater: The Queen's College, Oxford
- Occupations: archivist, historian, editor

Ralph Bernard Pugh (1 August 1910 – 3 December 1982) was an historian and editor of the Victoria History of the Counties of England from 1949 to 1977.

He was also a professor of English history at the University of London, a Fellow of St Edmund Hall, Oxford, a teacher of palaeography, and an expert on medieval penology.

== Life ==
Born at Sutton, Surrey, Pugh was the only child of Bernard Pugh (1859–1940), a journalist, by his marriage to Mabel Elizabeth (circa 1869–1943), and the grandson of Samuel Pugh, a Baptist minister in Devizes, Wiltshire, where until 1917 his uncles Clarence and Cyril Pugh were masters of the local grammar school. He was educated at Homefield, a preparatory school, then from 1924 to 1929 at St Paul's School, London, and finally at The Queen's College, Oxford, where he read modern history and graduated BA in 1932 with a First. He began a doctoral thesis on early nineteenth-century European historiography, but did not complete it.

== Career ==
In 1934 Pugh was appointed an assistant keeper at the Public Record Office in Chancery Lane, where he worked on calendars of archives. In 1937 he was the chief mover in the foundation of the records branch of the Wiltshire Archaeological and Natural History Society and went on to edit its first volume.

During the Second World War he was kept out of military service by a deformity of the spine and from 1940 to 1946 was seconded to the Dominions Office. In 1946 he returned to the PRO, but had already been approached by the corporation of Swindon in Wiltshire, which wished to support local history, and Pugh helped to establish a new partnership to create the Wiltshire Victoria County History, funded by Wiltshire local authorities, with a view to producing the Wiltshire volumes of the Victoria County History, none of which had yet appeared. This financial scheme was a real innovation which was imitated elsewhere.

In May 1949 Pugh became joint honorary editor of the VCH for Wiltshire and later the same year succeeded L.F. Salzman as general editor of the VCH at the national level, remaining in post until 1977. During those years some sixty new volumes were published. Pugh improved the finances of the project, and its general articles were expanded, using those of Wiltshire as a model. His efforts to choose and manage the VCH staff around England sometimes put him at odds with county leaders, and after 1966 he discouraged new VCH partnerships with local authorities, realising they made central control more difficult. He gave such active guidance to the project's historians, that his control was seen as paternalistic by some of them.

Pugh also wrote many reviews, became a supernumerary Fellow of St Edmund Hall, Oxford, taught palaeography, and from 1953 was chairman of the Wiltshire records branch, then from 1967 its president, when it became the Wiltshire Record Society. He also became an expert in medieval penology. Between 1963 and 1978, he took four sabbaticals in the United States, of which two were at Princeton. In 1968 he was appointed a professor of English history at the University of London, which later gave him the honorary degree of D. Litt. After retirement from the VCH in 1977, he continued his work on penal history. He was succeeded at the VCH by Christopher Elrington, and on his retirement was appointed an emeritus professor of London University.

In 1973 Pugh was a Fellow of the Folger Shakespeare Library of Washington, D.C.

== Personal life ==
Pugh never married and did not learn to drive a car. He was a High Anglican, and despite his stoop was very tall. His manners were very formal, and he was an enthusiast for precision. In Who's Who, he gave his recreation as sight-seeing.

He was Vice-President of the Selden Society from 1966 to 1969 and a member of the Council of the National Trust from 1967 to 1975.

His health was troubled by worsening spinal curvature and by pipe-smoking. Late in 1982 he was admitted to hospital with diverticulitis, contracted pneumonia, and died on 3 December, to be cremated at Golders Green.

== Selected publications ==
- Abstracts of Feet of Fines for Wiltshire, Edw. I and II (Wiltshire Record Society, 1939)
- Calendar of Antrobus deeds before 1625 (Wiltshire Record Society, 1947)
- How to Write a Parish History (1954)
- The Crown Estate (1960)
- Records of the Colonial and Dominions Offices (1964)
- 'The structure and aims of the Victoria History of the Counties of England', in Historical Research, vol. 40 (1967), pp. 65–73
- Itinerant Justices in English History (1967)
- Imprisonment in Medieval England (1968)
- Court Rolls of the Wiltshire Manors of Adam de Stratton (Wiltshire Record Society, 1970)
- 'The Victoria History: its origin and progress', in The Victoria History of the Counties of England: General Introduction (1970), pp. 1–27
- Calendar of London Trailbaston Trials (1976)
- Wiltshire Gaol Delivery and Trailbaston Trials, 1275–1306 (Wiltshire Record Society, 1978)
