= Devon and Cornwall Record Society =

Devon and Cornwall Record Society logo

The Devon and Cornwall Record Society is a text publication society founded in 1904. It publishes scholarly editions of historical records relating to the south west of England. It is based at the Devon Heritage Centre, Exeter.

== Selected publications ==
=== Old series (before 1955) ===
- 1906: A calendar of Inquisitions Post Mortem for Cornwall and Devon, from Henry III to Charles I, 1216–1649, ed. E. A. Fry
- 1906: The Registers of Parkham, J. I. Dredge
- 1906: The Register of Baptisms, Marriages and Burials of the Parish of Ottery St. Mary, Devon, 1601–1837, ed. H. Tapley-Soper
- 1910: Subsidy Rolls, Muster and Hearth Tax Rolls, and Probate Calendars of the Parish of St Constantine (Kerrier) Cornwall
- 1910: The Registers of Baptisms, Marriages and Burials of the city of Exeter, 2 vols., ed. H. Tapley-Soper – vol. 1
- 1912: Devon Feet of Fines, 2 vols, eds O. Reichel, J. Oswald, F. B. Prideaux, H. Tapley-Soper – vol. 1
- 1913: The Registers of Baptisms, Marriages and Burials of the Parish of Branscombe, Devon, 1539-1812, eds H. Tapley-Soper, E. Chick
- 1914: Cornwall Feet of Fines, 2 vols, ed. J. H. Rowe – vol. 1
- 1914: The Register of Baptisms, Marriages and Burials of the Parish of Falmouth in the county of Cornwall, 1663-1812, eds S. E. Gay, Mrs H. Fox Volume 2.
- 1917: The Register of Baptisms, Marriages and Burials of the Parish of Parracombe, Devon, 1597–1836, A. J. P. Skinner
- 1919: The Description of the Citie of Excester by Iohn Vowell alias Hoker, Gentleman and Chamberlayne of the same. Transcribed and edited from a manuscript in the archives of the corporation of the city of Exeter, eds J. W. Harte, J. W. Schopp, H. Tapley-Soper
- 1923: The Register of Baptisms, Marriages and Burials of the Parish of Hemyock, Devon, 1635–1837, with the bishop's transcripts for the years 1602, 1606, 1611, 1617, 1625, 1626, 1633, 1636, and a list of the rectors and chaplain priests, A. J. P. Skinner
- 1927: The Register of Baptisms, Marriages and Burials of the Parish of Lustleigh, Devon, 1631–1837, and extracts from the bishop's transcripts, 1608–1811, eds H. Johnston, H. Tapley-Soper
- 1928: The Register of Baptisms, Marriages and Burials of the Parish of Colyton, Devon, 1538–1837, A. J. P. Skinner
- 1930: The Register of Baptisms, Marriages and Burials of the Parish of Halberton, Devon, 1605–1837, C. A. T. Fursdon
- 1930: The Register of Baptisms, Marriages and Burials of the Parish of Hartland, Devon, 1558–1837, eds J. I. Dredge, H. Tapley-Soper
- 1938: The Register of Baptisms, Marriages and Burials of the Parish of Widecombe-in-the-Moor, Devon, eds E. C. Wood, H. Tapley-Soper
- 1938: Parish of Topsham, co. Devon. Marriages, Baptisms and Burials, A.D. 1600 to 1837, from the Parochial Register, the Register of the Independent Meeting, the Register of the Presbyterians, the Register of the Quakers, together with copies of memorial inscriptions, ed. H. Tapley-Soper - online, HathiTrust ID 000112302
- 1940: The Register of Marriages, Baptisms and Burials of the Parish of Plymtree, co. Devon, A.D. 1538 to 1837, ed. E. Hay
- 1945: The Register of Marriages, Baptisms and Burials of the Parish of Camborne, co. Cornwall, A.D. 1538 to 1837, eds S. E. Gay, Mrs H. Fox, S. Fox, H. Tapley-Soper
- 1948: Transcripts of Parish Registers, Bishops' Transcripts, etc., in the possession of the Society, revised edn.
- 1954: The Register of Marriages, Baptisms and Burials of the Parish of Lapford, co. Devon, A.D. 1567 to 1837, A. R. Densham
- 1954: The Register of the Parish of St Andrew's, Plymouth, co. Devon, A.D. 1581 to 1618, with Baptisms, 1619–1633, ed. M. C. S. Cruwys
