= Cawdon Hundred =

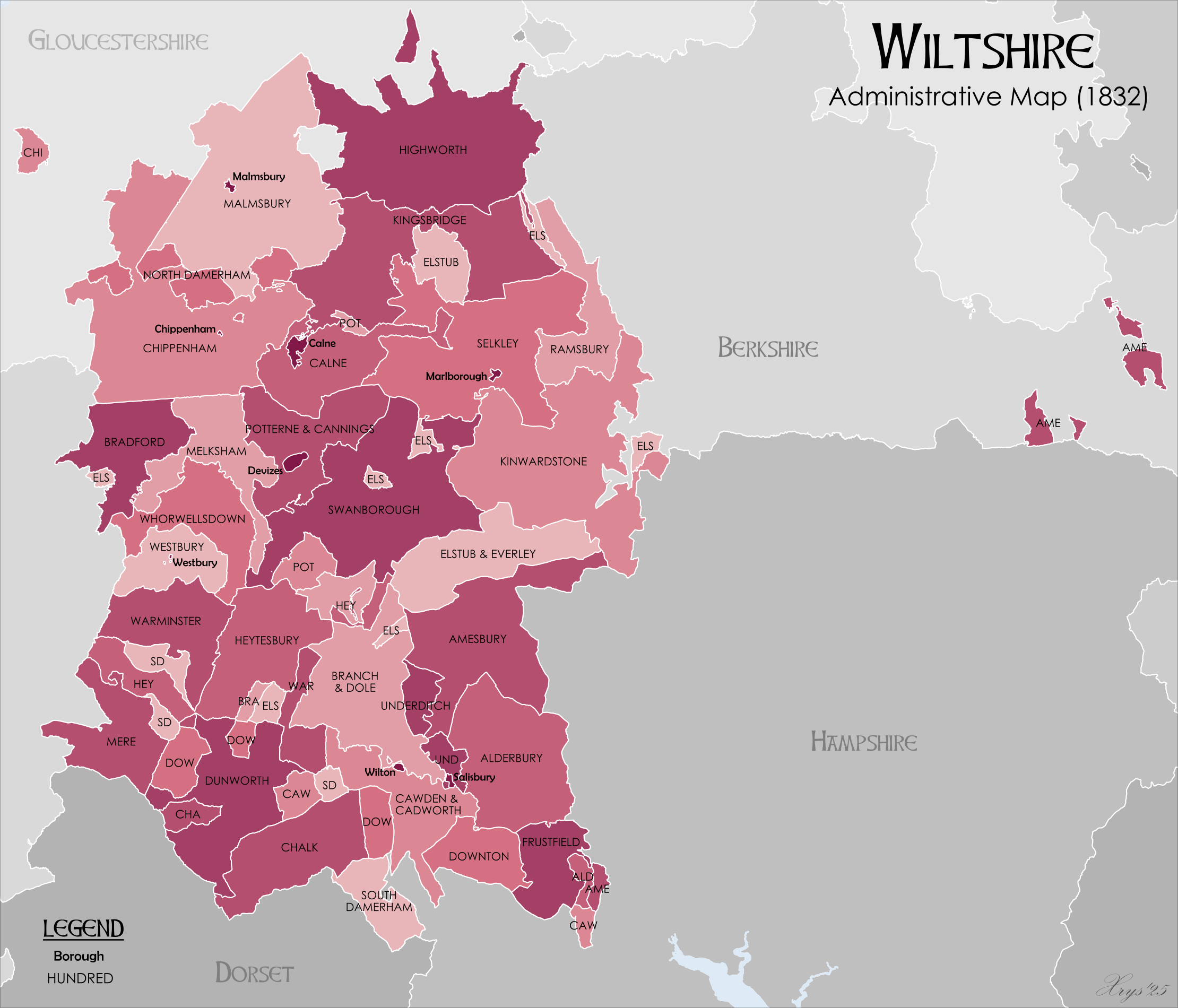
Hundreds of Wiltshire in 1832

Cawdon Hundred, also known as Cawden Hundred, was a judicial and taxation subdivision of the English county of Wiltshire. It later became the hundred of Cawden and Cadworth.

== Etymology ==
The name of the hundred is attested in the Domesday book of 1086 as Cauuadone, de Cauaadona, and Cauduna, with largely similar later attestations. There has been no doubt that the second part of the name comes from Old English dūn (meaning "hill"), but there has been debate about the first element. Suggestions up to 1943 include Old English calu ("bare") and cawel ("basket"), but subsequent work has preferred an Old English word cawe, meaning "jackdaw" or "corvid". If so, the name once meant something like "jackdaw hill".
