= Wiltshire Record Society =

The Wiltshire Record Society is a text publication society in Wiltshire, England, which edits and publishes historic documents concerned with the history of Wiltshire.

== History ==
In 1937, Ralph Pugh was the chief mover in a proposal to found the records branch of the Wiltshire Archaeological and Natural History Society. The Records Branch was established in 1939, and in 1967 it became the Wiltshire Record Society, an independent organisation. However, the numbering of the volumes published has remained continuous, the last volume published by the Records Branch being number 21 and the first volume under the new regime being number 22. The books published by both have all been bound in pale blue cloth and have the same size and format.

The work of the society is funded by the subscribing members, some of them being academic bodies and libraries, but most are private individuals. An annual general meeting is held in Wiltshire once a year, usually in June.

== Presidents ==
- 1967–1982: R. B. Pugh
- 1982–2009: Christopher Elrington
- 2009– : Negley Harte

== General editors ==
- 1962–1972: Christopher Elrington
- 1972–1976: Douglas A. Crowley
- 1976–1978: D. C. Cox
- 1979–1981: Janet H. Stevenson
- 1981–1982: vacant
- 1982–1988: J. L. Kirby
- 1988–1995: Jane Freeman
- 1995–2007: John Chandler
- 2007–2014: Virginia Bainbridge (jointly with Steven Hobbs from 2013)
- 2013– : Steven Hobbs (jointly with Virginia Bainbridge from 2013)

== Publications ==
Since 1939, the Society and its predecessor the Records Branch have produced roughly one volume per year, the list of publications being as follows:

1. Abstracts of feet of fines relating to Wiltshire for the reigns of Edward I and Edward II, ed. Ralph Pugh, 1939
2. Accounts of the parliamentary garrisons of Great Chalfield and Malmesbury, 1645–1646, H. P. Pafford, 1940
3. Calendar of Antrobus deeds before 1625, ed. R. B. Pugh, 1947
4. Wiltshire county records: minutes of proceedings in sessions, 1563 and 1574 to 1592, ed. H. C. Johnson, 1949
5. List of Wiltshire borough records earlier in date than 1836, ed. M. G. Rathbone, 1951
6. The Trowbridge woollen industry as illustrated by the stock books of John and Thomas Clark 1804–1824, ed. R. P. Beckinsale
7. Guild stewards book of the borough of Calne, 1561–1688, ed. A. W. Mabbs, 1953
8. Andrews' and Dury's map of Wiltshire, 1773: a reduced facsimile, ed. Elizabeth Crittall, 1952
9. Surveys of the manors of Philip Herbert, 5th Earl of Pembroke, 1631-2, ed. E. Kerridge, 1953
10. Two sixteenth century taxation lists, 1545 and 1576, ed. G. D. Ramsay, 1954
11. Wiltshire quarter sessions and assizes, 1736, ed. J. P. M. Fowle, 1955
12. Collectanea, ed. N.J. Williams, 1956
13. Progress notes of Warden Woodward for the Wiltshire estates of New College, Oxford, 1659–1675, ed. R. L. Rickard, 1957
14. Accounts and surveys of the Wiltshire lands of Adam de Stratton, 1268–86, ed. M. W. Farr, 1959
15. Tradesmen in early-Stuart Wiltshire : a miscellany, ed. N. J. Williams, 1960
16. Crown pleas of the Wiltshire eyre, 1249, ed. C. A. F. Meekings, 1961
17. Wiltshire apprentices and their masters, 1710–1760, ed. Christabel Dale, 1961
18. Hemingby's register, ed. Helena M. Chew, 1963
19. Documents illustrating the Wiltshire textile trades in the eighteenth century, ed. Julia de L. Mann, 1964
20. The diary of Thomas Naish, ed. Doreen Slatter, 1965
21. The rolls of the Highworth hundred 1275–1287, part 1, ed. Brenda Farr, 1966,
22. The rolls of the Highworth hundred 1275–1287, part 2, ed. Brenda Farr, 1968
23. The earl of Hertford's lieutenancy papers, 1603–1612, ed. W. P. D. Murphy, 1969
24. Court rolls of the Wiltshire manors of Adam de Stratton, ed. R. B. Pugh, 1970.
25. Abstracts of Wiltshire inclosure awards and agreements, ed. R. E. Sandell, 1971
26. Civil pleas of the Wiltshire eyre, 1249, ed. M. T. Clanchy, 1971
27. Wiltshire returns to the bishop's visitation queries, 1783, ed. Mary Ransome, 1972
28. Wiltshire extents for debts, Edward I – Elizabeth I, ed. Angela Conyers, 1973
29. Abstracts of feet of fines relating to Wiltshire for the reign of Edward III, ed. C. R. Elrington, 1974
30. Abstracts of Wiltshire tithe apportionments, ed. R. E. Sandell, 1975
31. Poverty in early-Stuart Salisbury, ed. Paul Slack, 1975
32. The subscription book of Bishops Tounson and Davenant, 1620–40, ed. B. Williams, 1977
33. Wiltshire gaol delivery and trailbaston trials, 1275–1306, ed. R. B. Pugh, 1978
34. Lacock Abbey charters, ed. K. H. Rogers, 1979
35. The cartulary of Bradenstoke Priory, ed. Vera C. M. London, 1979
36. Wiltshire coroners' bills, 1752–1796, ed. R. F. Hunnisett, 1981
37. Two justicing notebooks of William Hunt, 1744–1749, ed. Elizabeth Crittall, 1982
38. Two Elizabethan women : correspondence of Joan and Maria Thynne, 1575–1611, ed. Alison D. Wall, 1983
39. The register of John Chandler, dean of Salisbury, 1404–17, ed. T. C. B. Timmins, 1984
40. Wiltshire dissenters meeting house certificates and registrations, 1689–1852, ed. J. H. Chandler, 1985
41. Abstracts of feet of fines relating to Wiltshire, 1377–1509, ed. J. L. Kirby, 1986
42. The Edington cartulary, ed. Janet H. Stevenson, 1987
43. The commonplace book of Sir Edward Bayntun of Bromham, ed. Jane Freeman, 1988
44. The diaries of Jeffery Whitaker, schoolmaster of Bratton, 1739–1741, ed. Marjorie Reeves and Jean Morrison, 1989
45. The Wiltshire tax list of 1332, ed. D. A. Crowley, 1989
46. Calendar of Bradford-on-Avon settlement examinations and removal orders, 1725–98, ed. Phyllis Hembry, 1990
47. Early trade directories of Wiltshire, ed. K. H. Rogers and indexed by J. H. Chandler, 1992
48. Star chamber suits of John and Thomas Warneford, ed. F. E. Warneford, 1993
49. The Hungerford cartulary : a calendar of the earl of Radnor's cartulary of the Hungerford family, ed. J. L. Kirby, 1994
50. The Letters of John Peniston, Salisbury architect, Catholic, and Yeomanry Officer, 1823–1830, ed. M. Cowan, 1996
51. The Apprentice Registers of the Wiltshire Society, 1817–1922, ed. H. R. Henly, 1997
52. Printed Maps of Wiltshire 1787–1844 : a selection of topographical, road and canal maps, in facsimile, ed. John Chandler, 1998
53. Monumental Inscriptions of Wiltshire, ed. Peter Sherlock, 2000
54. The First General Entry Book of the City of Salisbury, 1387–1452, ed. David R. Carr, 2001
55. Devizes Division income tax assessments, 1842–1860, ed. Robert Colley, 2002
56. Wiltshire Glebe Terriers, 1588–1827, ed. Steven Hobbs, 2003
57. Wiltshire Farming in the Seventeenth Century, ed. Joseph Bettey, 2005
58. Early Motor Vehicle Registration in Wiltshire 1903–1914, ed. Ian Hicks, 2006
59. Marlborough Probate Inventories 1591–1775, ed. Lorelei Williams and Sally Thomson, 2007
60. The Hungerford Cartulary, Part 2: a calendar of the Hobhouse cartulary of the Hungerford family, ed. J. L. Kirby, 2007
61. The Court Records of Brinkworth and Charlton, 1544–1648, ed. Douglas Crowley, 2009
62. The Diary of William Henry Tucker, 1825–1850, ed. Helen Rogers, 2009
63. Gleanings from Wiltshire Parish Registers, ed. Steven Hobbs, 2010
64. William Small's Cherished Memories and Associations, ed. Jane Howells and Ruth Newman, 2011
65. Crown Pleas of the Wiltshire Eyre, 1268, ed. Brenda Farr and Christopher Elrington, 2012
66. The Minute Books of Froxfield Almshouse 1714–1866, ed. Douglas Crowley, 2013
67. Wiltshire Quarter Sessions Order Book, 1642–1654, ed. Ivor Slocombe, 2014
68. Register of John Blyth, Bishop of Salisbury, 1493–1499, ed. David Wright, 2015
69. The Churchwardens’ Accounts of St Mary’s, Devizes, 1633–1689, ed. Alex Craven, 2016
70. Arundell Papers and Accounts 1745–1798, ed. Barry Williamson, 2017
71. Letters of Henry Hoare of Stourhead, 1760–1781, ed. Dudley Dodd, 2018
72. Braydon Forest and the Forest Law, ed. Douglas Crowley, 2019
73. The Parish Registers of Thomas Crockford, 1561–1633, ed. John Chandler, 2020
74. The Farming Diaries of Thomas Pinniger, 1813–1847, ed. Alan Wadsworth, 2021

== See also ==
- History of Wiltshire
- Wiltshire Archaeological and Natural History Society
- Wiltshire Victoria County History
- Wiltshire and Swindon History Centre
