= England's Past for Everyone =

England’s Past for Everyone, commonly known as EPE, was a Heritage Lottery funded project run by the Victoria County History between September 2005 and February 2010.

Authors and researchers worked alongside volunteers in ten counties to produce 15 paperback publications, an interactive website, and schools and learning resources.

== General ==
England’s Past for Everyone was a community-based project where historians and local volunteers collaborated to create a range of resources under the heading 'Bringing local history to life'. The project produced a series of books and interactive materials for schools. There were 15 individual county projects created over the duration of the scheme.

The project was part of the Victoria County History, which was founded in 1899 to create an encyclopaedic record of England’s places and people.

EPE's aim was to help more people access their local history by:

- Publishing a series of paperback books
- Working with schools and other partners to provide education resources
- Coordinating and supporting a series of volunteer programmes
- Developing an interactive website to explore the images, documents and audio visual material that has been discovered

== Strapline ==
- "Bringing local history to life."
- "History is not just about the dim and distant past, it's happening right now. This is your chance to get involved in the life story of your community."

== Counties and projects involved ==
- Bristol – Identity and the City: A History of Ethnic Minorities in Bristol 1000–2001
- Cornwall – (1) The Fishing Communities of Mousehole and Newlyn, (2) Religious Houses of Cornwall
- Durham – (1) Sunderland and its Origins: Monks and Mariners, (2) Townscape of Sunderland
- Derbyshire – (1) Bolsover: Castle and Townscape, (2) Hardwick Hall, Estate and Village
- Exmoor – The Settlement of Exmoor
- Herefordshire – (1) Ledbury Pre-1558, (2) Ledbury Post-1558
- Kent – People and Work in the Lower Medway Valley 1750–1900
- Oxfordshire – (1) Buildings and People of Burford, (2) Town and River: A History of Henley-on-Thames
- Sussex – Parham: An Elizabethan House and its Restoration
- Wiltshire – Codford: Wool and War in Wiltshire

== See also ==
- Victoria County History
