= Victoria County History =

English history project

Victoria History of the Counties of England
- The VCH logo
- Country: United Kingdom
- Language: English
- Discipline: History
- Publisher: Institute of Historical Research
- Media type: Print
- Website: www.history.ac.uk/research/victoria-county-history

The Victoria History of the Counties of England, commonly known as the Victoria County History (VCH), is an English history project which began in 1899 with the aim of creating an encyclopaedic history of each of the historic counties of England, and was dedicated to Queen Victoria. In 2012 the project was rededicated to Queen Elizabeth II in celebration of her Diamond Jubilee year. Since 1933 the project has been coordinated by the Institute of Historical Research in the University of London.

== History ==
The history of the VCH falls into three main phases, defined by different funding regimes: an early phase, 1899–1914, when the project was conceived as a commercial enterprise, and progress was rapid; a second more desultory phase, 1914–1947, when relatively little progress was made; and the third phase beginning in 1947, when, under the auspices of the Institute of Historical Research, a high academic standard was set, and progress has been slow but reasonably steady.

These phases have also been characterised by changing attitudes towards the proper scope of English local history. The early volumes were planned on the model of traditional English county histories, with a strong emphasis on manorial descents, the advowsons of parish churches, and the local landed gentry: a prospectus of c. 1904 stated that "there is no Englishman to whom [the VCH] does not in some one or other of its features make a direct appeal". More recent volumes – especially those published since the 1950s – have been more wide-ranging in their approach, and have included systematic coverage of social and economic history, industrial history, population history, educational history, landscape history, religious nonconformity, and so on; individual parish histories have consequently grown considerably in length and complexity.

From 1902 the joint general editors were H. Arthur Doubleday and William Page. Doubleday resigned (in acrimonious circumstances) in 1904, leaving Page as sole general editor until his death in 1934. In 1932 Page bought the rights to the ailing project for a nominal sum, donating it to the Institute of Historical Research the following year. Page was succeeded as general editor by L. F. Salzman, who remained in post until 1949. The early volumes depended heavily on the efforts of a large number of young research workers, mostly female, fresh from degree courses at Oxford, Cambridge, London or the Scottish universities, for whom other employment opportunities were limited: the VCH of this period has been described as "a history for gentlemen largely researched by ladies".

From 1909 until 1931 Frederick Smith, later 2nd Viscount Hambleden, was the VCH's major sponsor. In February 2005 the Heritage Lottery Fund awarded the VCH £3,374,000 to fund the England's Past for Everyone project, which ran from September that year until February 2010.

== Progress ==
VCH progress by county

The first VCH volume was published in 1901, and publication continued “at the stateliest of paces” throughout the 20th century, although in some counties it has come to a halt, especially during World War I and again in the 1970s. Some inactive counties have recently been reactivated.

There are now more than 230 VCH volumes, with around three new volumes published per year. Each is published with a red cover, and they are therefore sometimes known as "the big red books". When the Institute of Historical Research published a short history of the project to mark the 75th anniversary of taking it over, it was titled The Little Big Red Book. A special edition Jubilee book was published in 2012, A Diamond Jubilee Celebration 1899–2012.

A map showing the publication status appears on the VCH website.

== Structure and content of the county histories ==
From its inception, responsibility for writing the volumes was delegated to local editors for each individual county. The county editors traditionally worked under the direction of a general editor, following a uniform format and style.

In general, the histories begin with one or more volumes of general studies of the county as a whole, including major themes, such as religious history, agriculture, industries, population (with summary tables of decennial census totals 1801–1901), and an introduction to and translation of the relevant section of Domesday Book. These volumes are followed by others consisting of detailed historical surveys of each Hundred, Wapentake (discussed in separate riding volumes) and ward, parish by parish. At first, ancient ecclesiastical parishes formed the unit of investigation, but since the mid-1950s the VCH parish is the civil parish, the modern successor of the ancient parishes or of townships within them. Large towns are dealt with as a whole, including, since the 1960s, built-up areas of adjoining, formerly rural parishes.

Under the original plan, each county, in addition to its general and topographical volumes, was to have a genealogical volume containing the pedigrees of county families. Genealogical volumes were published in a large folio format for Northamptonshire (1906) and Hertfordshire (1907), but the research costs were found to be excessive, and this side of the project was discontinued.

== Completed county histories ==
Some of the county histories have been completed, as follows:

County	Number of volumes	Year completed
Bedfordshire	3 + index	1914
Berkshire	4 + index	1927
Buckinghamshire	4 + index	1928
Cambridgeshire	10 + index	2002
Hampshire	5 + index	1914
Hertfordshire	4 + index	1923
Huntingdonshire	3 + index	1938
Lancashire	8	1914
Rutland	2 + index	1936
Surrey	4 + index	1914
Warwickshire	8 + index	1969
Worcestershire	4 + index	1926
Yorkshire (general volumes)	3 + index	1925
Yorkshire (North Riding)	2 + index	1925

== Counties in progress ==
For each uncompleted county history on which work is continuing (i.e.: "active" in VCH terminology), progress is as follows:

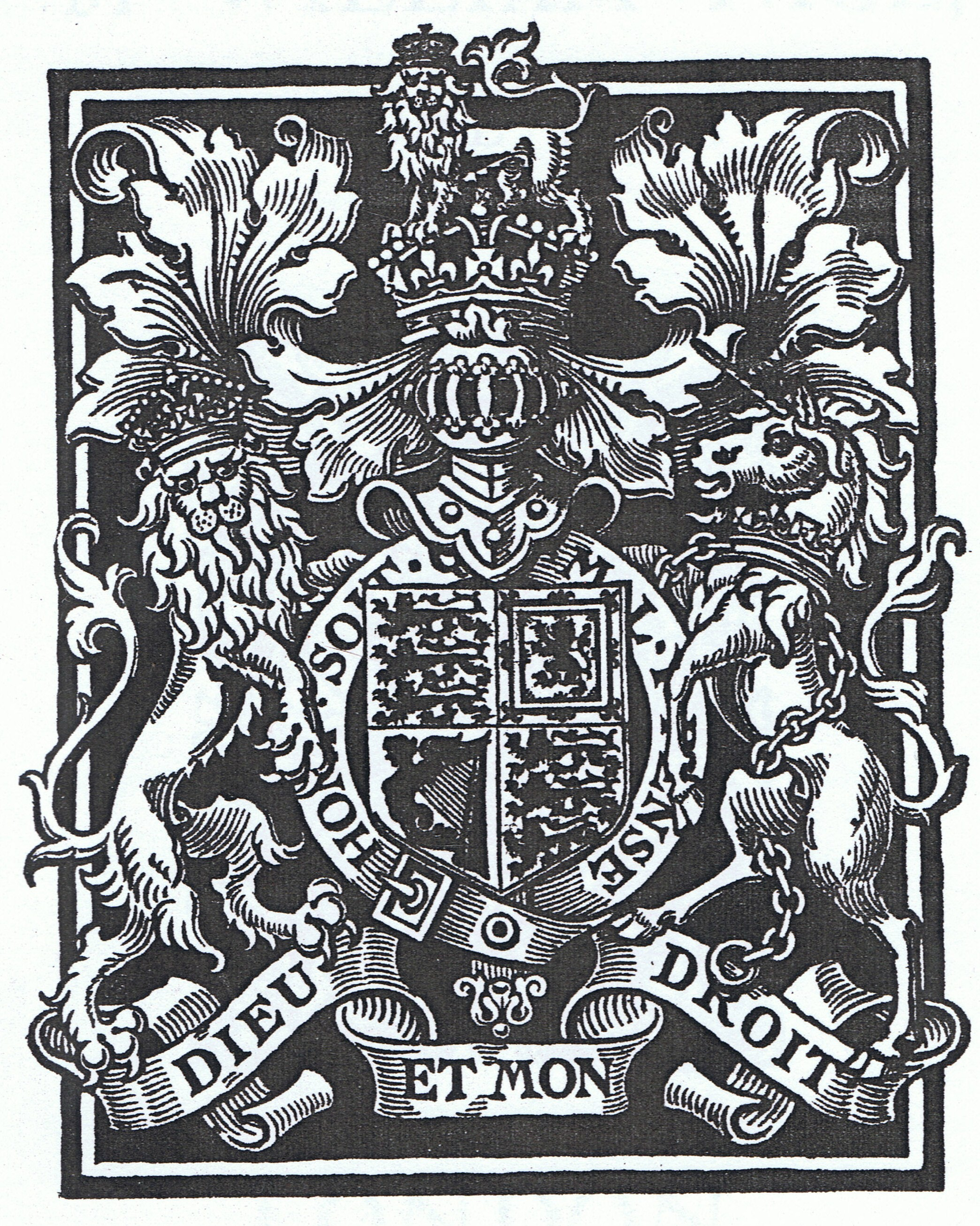
From a VCH frontispiece, 1911

County	Number of volumes published	Year of most recent volume
Cornwall	1 in two parts	1925
County Durham	5	2015
Cumberland	2	1968
Derbyshire	3	2013
Essex	12	2022
Gloucestershire	11	2016
Herefordshire	1	1975
Kent	3	1974
Leicestershire	5	1988
Middlesex	13	2009
Northamptonshire	7	2013
Nottinghamshire	2	1907
Oxfordshire	20	2022
Shropshire	11	2014
Somerset	11	2015
Staffordshire	15	2021
Sussex	11	2009
Westmorland	none	
Wiltshire	18	2011
Yorkshire (East Riding)	10	2021
Yorkshire (West Riding)	none	

== Dormant counties ==
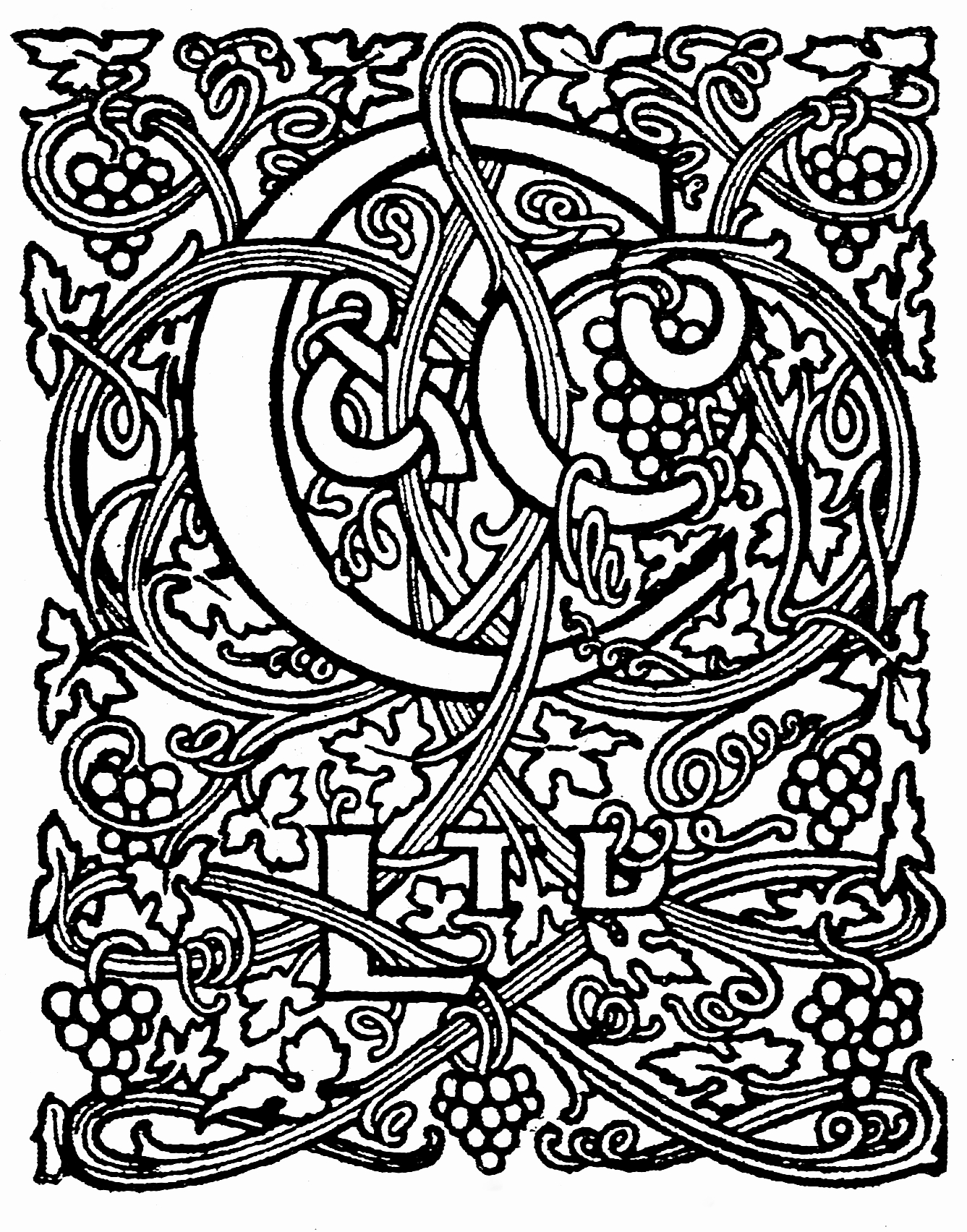
Logo of VCH publisher, Constable & Co. Ltd

Several volumes are not currently being worked on.

County	Number of volumes published	Year of most recent volume
Cheshire	6	2005
Devon	1	1906
Dorset	2	1968
Lincolnshire	1	1906
London	1	1974
Norfolk	2	1975
Suffolk	2	1975
Yorkshire (general volumes and city of York)	4	1974

== Counties with no published volumes ==
- Northumberland produced its own, non-VCH, history in 15 volumes, published by the Northumberland County History Committee, completed in 1940.
- Monmouthshire, sometimes regarded between the 16th and 20th centuries as an English county, has never been treated as such by the VCH, and has never been proposed for inclusion within the project. A non-VCH county history of Gwent/Monmouthshire was published by the University of Wales Press in five volumes between 2004 and 2013.
- Westmorland has not yet produced a VCH volume, but the area is included within the VCH Cumbria project.

== General editors ==
- William Page (General Editor 1904–34)
- Louis Francis Salzman (General Editor 1934–49)
- Ralph Pugh (General Editor 1949–77)
- Christopher Elrington (General Editor 1977–94)
- Christopher Currie (General Editor 1994–2000)
- Anthony Fletcher (General Editor/Director 2000–2005)
- John Beckett (General Editor/Director 2005–2010)
- Elizabeth Williamson (Executive Editor 2010–2014)
- Richard Hoyle (General Editor/Director 2014–2016)
- Catherine Clarke (Director 2019–present)

== Notable county editors ==
- William Page (Somerset, also general editor)
- David Crouch (Yorkshire, East Riding)
- Peter Ditchfield (Berkshire)
- Mary Lobel (Oxfordshire)
- Susan Reynolds (Middlesex)
- J. Horace Round (Essex)
- John William Willis-Bund (Worcestershire)
- Oswald Barron (general editor of the genealogical volumes for Northamptonshire and Hertfordshire)

== Notable contributors ==
- Mary Bateson
- Madeleine Hope Dodds (contributed to Durham)
- Charles Reed Peers (Architectural Editor, 1903–10)
- Maud Sellars (contributed to Yorkshire, Durham)
- Ethel Stokes (contributed to Essex)
- Margerie Venables Taylor

== Online availability ==
Much of the content of the older VCH volumes is now accessible via the British History Online digital library, digitised by double rekeying. Priority has been given to the topographical volumes containing histories of individual parishes. The more general introductory volumes are excluded for the time being, with the exception of those sections covering the religious houses of each county.

== See also ==
- Gloucestershire Victoria County History
- Somerset Victoria County History
- Wiltshire Victoria County History
- Cambridge County Geographies
- English county histories
- Historiography of the United Kingdom
