= Christopher Elrington =

English historian

- Christopher Elrington holding a volume of the Victoria County History
- Born: 20 January 1930; Farnborough, Hampshire, England
- Died: 3 August 2009 (aged 79)
- Education: Wellington College; University of London
- Known for: editing the Victoria County History
- Spouse: Jean Margaret Buchanan

Christopher Robin Elrington FRHistS FSA (20 January 1930 – 3 August 2009) was an English historian, known primarily for his work with the Victoria County History.

== Biography ==
Elrington was born in Farnborough, as the second of three sons of Brigadier Maxwell Elrington, and his wife Beryl. Christopher's father died in active service in Germany, while the son was 15. Elrington was educated at Wellington College, Berkshire, before performing his military service. He later went to University College, Oxford, where he took a BA. After this he did his MA in medieval history at Bedford College, University of London.

In 1954 Elrington started working for the Victoria County History. The project – an attempt to build a comprehensive history of all the counties of England – was at this time in a phase of revival, after having been dormant since the time of the First World War. Initially he worked primarily on the history of Birmingham, as well as a history of the parish of Woodford, Wiltshire (published in 1962), that would serve as a model for the format that the new editions of the works would adopt. In 1960 work started on the county of Gloucestershire, and Elrington moved to the county to get closer to the sources. Over the course of eight years, he and his assistants completed two and a half volumes covering over sixty places, which was considered a good rate of work. In 1968 he returned to London, where he became deputy editor of the whole project. Then, in 1977, he was made general editor, succeeding Ralph Pugh, and remained in this post until 1994. As the coordinator of the work of over thirty professional historians, he had great influence on the work, and put greater emphasis on such things as the history of the landscape. Much of his effort was also focused on financing the project, which at the time was running into financial difficulties.

From 1962 to 1972 he was the general editor of the Wiltshire Record Society, an honorary position.

Elrington became a Fellow of the Society of Antiquaries in 1964, and of the Royal Historical Society in 1969. The University of London gave him the title of professor in 1992, though he did not teach there. After he retired in 1994 he became an emeritus professor. While at Oxford he met and married Jean Margaret Buchanan, an architect. Together they had twins; a son and a daughter.

Elrington died at home in London on 3 August 2009.

== Selected publications ==
- Handbook for Editors and Authors of the Victoria History of the Counties of England. London: Institute of Historical Research. 1970. ISBN 978-0-901179-03-6.
- Abstracts of Feet of Fines Relating to Gloucestershire, 1199–1299. Gloucester: Bristol and Gloucestershire Archaeological Society. 2003. ISBN 0-900197-58-7.
