= Wiltshire Archaeological and Natural History Society =

The Wiltshire Archaeological and Natural History Society was founded in 1853, and is one of the largest county-based archaeological societies in the United Kingdom. It runs the Wiltshire Museum in Devizes, Wiltshire which has the best Bronze Age collections in Britain, including finds from Avebury and Stonehenge. It also publishes the annual Wiltshire Archaeological and Natural History Magazine.

The society has in the past published books of Wiltshire interest, such as the Tropenell Cartulary. The present-day Wiltshire Record Society began life as the Records Branch of the society.

== History ==
A motivation for the creation of the society was an 1852 proposal by the antiquarian and writer John Britton (1771–1857) to sell his collection of Wiltshire-related books, drawings etc. William Cunnington III (grandson of the pioneering excavator of the same name) formed a Devizes-based committee which purchased the collection for £150.

The inaugural meeting of the society was held at Devizes Town Hall on 12 October 1853, and attracted between 200 and 300 people including "many of the neighbouring Gentry and Clergy". The resolution to form the society stated that its objects would be "to cultivate and collect information on Archaeology and Natural History in their various branches, and to form a Library and Museum, illustrating the History, natural, civil and ecclesiastic, of the County of Wilts". George Poulett Scrope, a geologist and MP for Stroud, was elected as the president and gave an address. Membership subscriptions were set at 21 shillings for the first year and 10s 6d thereafter.

In 1893, the society had 393 members.

A history of the society was published in 1953, under the title The Wiltshire Archaeological and Natural History Society: 1853–1952: a centenary history.

== Notable officers ==
- George Scrope – first President
- Rev J. E. Jackson – founder member, one of the first Secretaries and Editor of the magazine; gave a talk at the annual meeting in most years until 1890
- General Pitt-Rivers – President 1890–1893
- Henry Bruce Meux – President 1893–1896
- Maud Cunnington – President 1931–1932
- Harold Brakspear – President 1932–1934
- Robert Awdry – President 1939–1946, Chairman until his death in 1949
- Margaret Guido – Vice President from 1984, Co-President 1987–1994
- Stuart Piggott – Co-President 1987–1996
