= European Parliament of Enterprises =

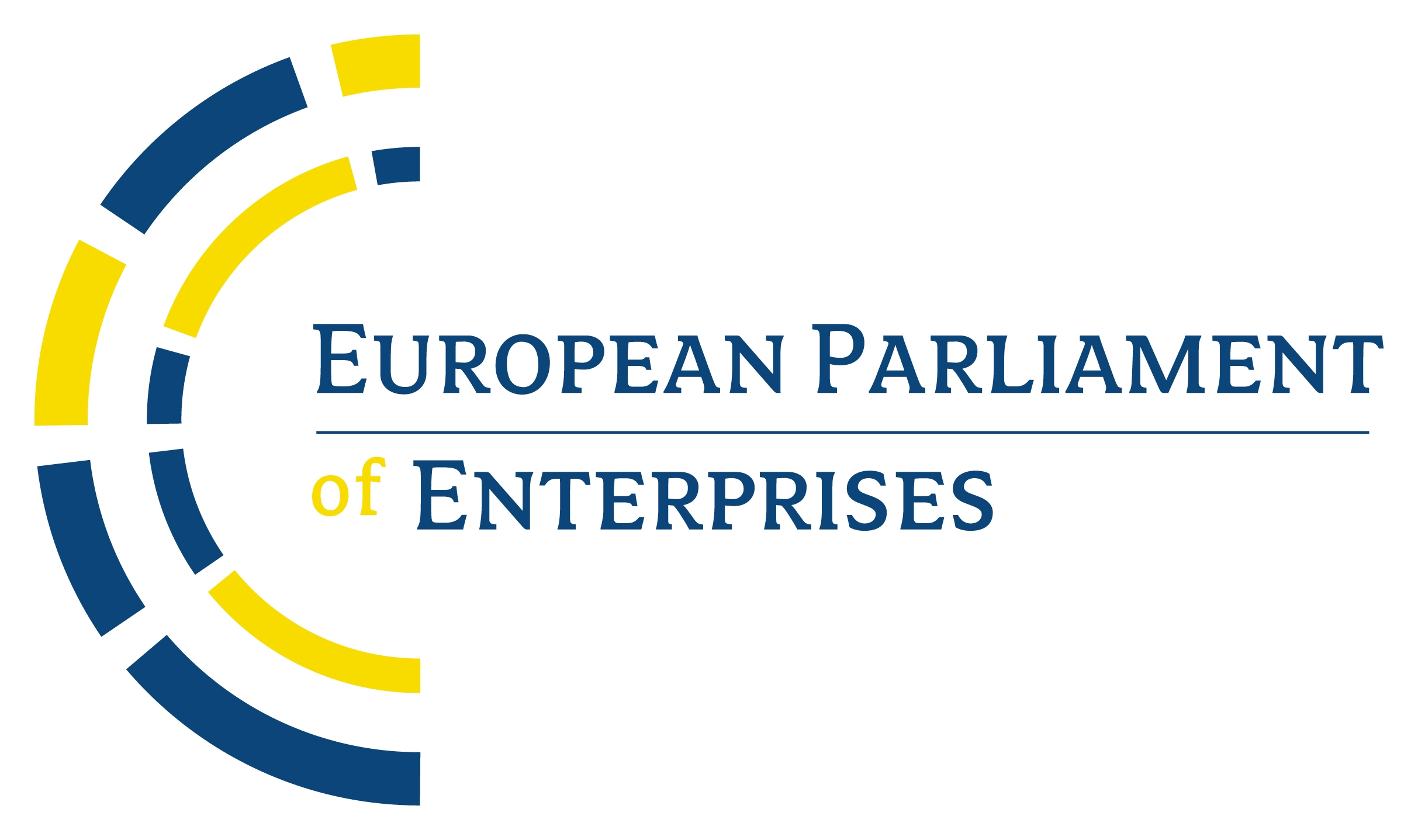
European Parliament of Enterprises

The European Parliament of Enterprises™ (EPE) is an event for European entrepreneurs, organized by Eurochambres, the Association of European Chambers of Commerce and Industry, once every two years. The first edition of the event was launched on 14 October 2008 on the occasion of Eurochambres' fiftieth anniversary.

== Concept ==
The concept of the European Parliament of Enterprises™ originated from the consideration, that there is a democratic gap between the European institutions and the main actors of economic growth, entrepreneurs and that, consequently, European legislators do not sufficiently take into account entrepreneurs' concerns. On the other hand, businesses are largely unfamiliar with the role and functioning of the European Union and the significance that the institutions’ decisions can have on their activities and results.

== Participants ==
720 entrepreneurs, or Members of the European Parliament of Enterprises™ (MEPEs), gather in the symbolic location of the Hemicycle of the European Parliament. The composition of the EPE reflects the number of Members of the European Parliament per member state.

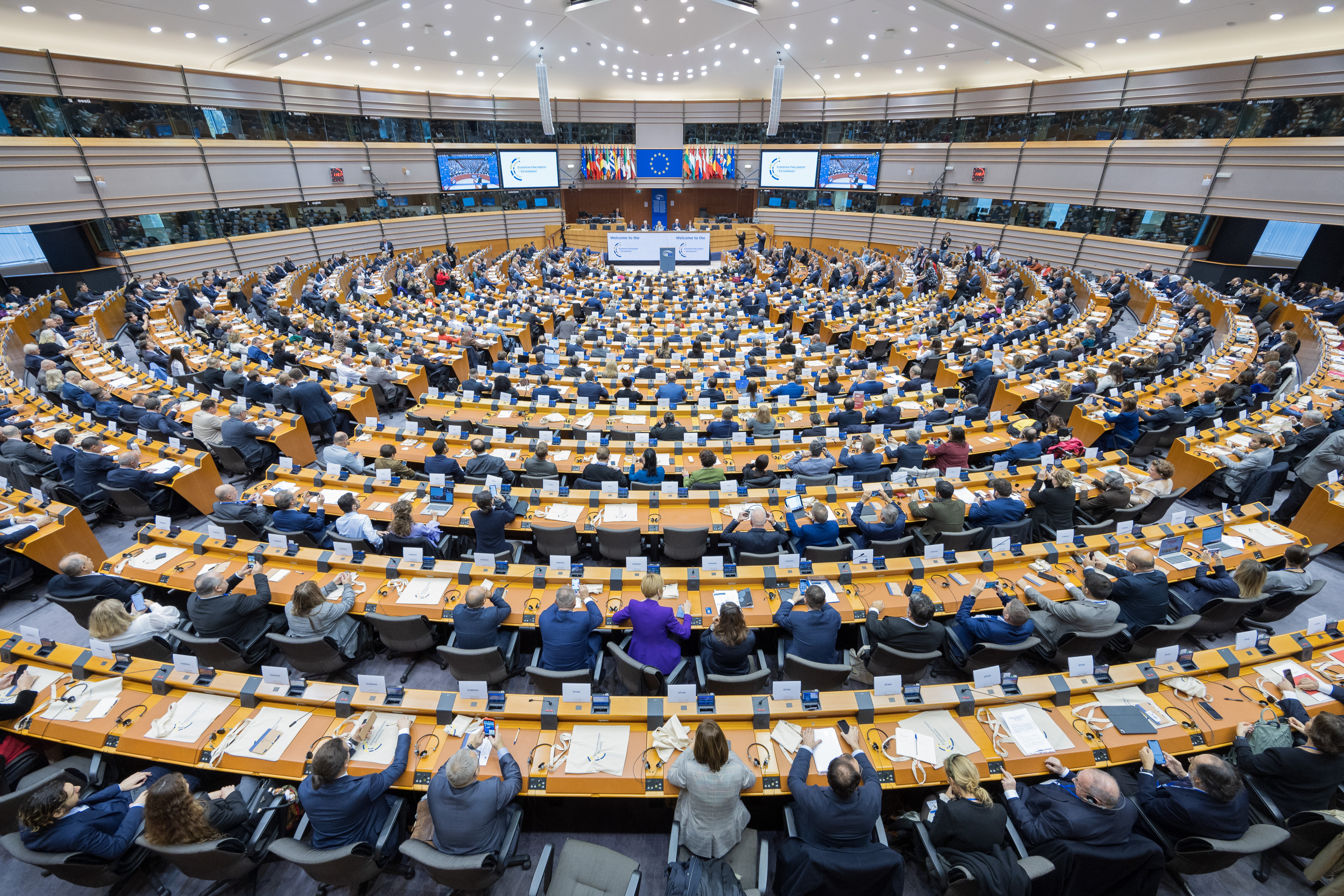
EPE 2023 - 6th edition

== Aims and objectives ==
The EPE aims to bring businesses and institutions face-to-face for one day so as to enhance mutual understanding. The EPE represents a unique opportunity for businesses to have a direct debate with high European representatives and to provide them with a direct bottom-up feedback on EU policy related issues.

== Votes ==
During the EPE, Members of the European Parliament of Enterprises exercise their voting rights on major EU business-related issues. The results of the votes are presented by Eurochambres to the relevant political interlocutors from all of the EU institutions as "the voice of European businesses”. The "European Parliament of Enterprises” is organised with the active cooperation of Eurochambres' members, the national associations of Chambers of Commerce & Industry.
