= List of windmills in the United Kingdom =

Windmills have played a significant role in British history, particularly in agriculture and early industry. This is a list of windmills and windpumps in the United Kingdom.

== England ==
The list is divided into the current ceremonial counties of England:

=== Bedfordshire ===
See List of windmills in Bedfordshire

=== Berkshire ===
Location	Name of mill and grid reference	Type	Maps	First mention or built	Last mention or demise	Photograph
Bracknell	Amen Corner Mill				Demolished by 1936	
Cookham	Sutton Farm	Titt iron wind engine		1894		
Easthampstead	Caesars Camp					
Faringdon	Wadley House	Titt iron wind engine		1900		
Lockinge	Lockinge Downs	Titt iron wind engine		1895		
Slough	Salt Hill Mill	Smock			Moved to Great Thurlow, Suffolk	
Slough	Salt Hill Mill (2nd mill)	Smock			Moved to Luton, Kent 1848.	
Winkfield	Chavey Down Mill					
Winkfield	Maiden's Green Mill					

Mock mill

Location	Name of mill and grid reference	Type	Maps	First mention or built	Last mention or demise	Photograph
Wraysbury	Splash Mill	Smock		1996		

=== Buckinghamshire ===
See List of windmills in Buckinghamshire

=== Cambridgeshire ===
See List of windmills in Cambridgeshire

=== Cheshire ===
Windmills in Cheshire, including those now within Merseyside.

Location	Name of mill and grid reference	Type	Maps	First mention or built	Last mention or demise	Photograph
Bidston	Bidston Windmill; SJ 287 894	tower		Late 18th century	Windmill World	
Bromborough	Bromborough Mills	tower		1870	1870	
Buerton	Buerton Mill; SJ 686 440	Tower		Late 18th or early 19th century	Windmill World	
Burland	Ravensmoor Mill; SJ 623 530	Tower		Early 19th century	Windmill World	
Burton	Burton Windmill; SJ 313 745	Post		1771	Demolished, only 8 courses of roundhouse remain. Windmill World	
Gayton	Gayton Mill; SJ 278 812	Tower			Windmill World	
Great Saughall	Gibbet Mill; SJ 364 723	Tower		Late 18th century	Windmill World	
Halton	SJ 519 829					
Helsby	Hornsmill, Hapsford; SJ 481 741			19th century		
Helsby	Helsby Mill	Tower				
Neston	Great Neston Mill; SJ 289 781	Tower		Mid-18th century	Windmill World	
Penketh	Penketh Mill	Post				
Threapwood	Bevan's Mill; SJ 442 452	Tower		Early 18th century	Windmill World	
Upton-by-Chester	Dean's Mill; SJ 409 688	Tower		c. 1775	Windmill World	
Warrington	Hill Cliff Mill	Tower			1839	
Willaston	Willaston Mill; SJ 328 785	Tower		1805	Windmill World	

=== Cornwall ===
See List of windmills in Cornwall

=== Cumbria ===
Location	Name of mill and grid reference	Type	Maps	First mention or built	Last mention or demise	Photograph
Cardewlees	Cardewlees Mill; NY 347 513	Tower			Windmill World	
Cockermouth	Cockermouth Mill; NY 118 308	Tower		Early 19th century	Windmill World	
Hodbarrow	Haverigg Mill; SD 184 783	Tower			Windmill World	
Langrigg	Langrigg Mill; NY 170 455	Tower		Early 19th century	Windmill World	
Monkhill	Monkhill Mill; NY 342 585	Tower		Late 18th century	Windmill World	
Wigton	Wigton Mill; NY 252 488	Tower				
Workington	Schoose Mill; NY 014 279	Tower			Windmill World	

=== Derbyshire ===
See List of windmills in Derbyshire

=== Devon ===
See List of windmills in Devon.

=== Dorset ===
Location	Name of mill and grid reference	Type	Maps	First mention or built	Last mention or demise	Photograph
Easton	Cottonfields Mill; Angel Mill; SY 691 714	Tower	1710	1710	Windmill World	
Easton	Top Growlands Mill; South Mill; SY 692 713	Tower	1710	17th century	Windmill World	
Gillingham	The Kendalls	Titt iron wind engine		1895		
Melbury Abbas	Cann Mill; ST 872 208	Tower		1970	Demolished 2009; Windmill World	

Maps

- 1710 John Hutchins

=== Durham ===
Location	Name of mill and grid reference	Type	Maps	First mention or built	Last mention or demise	Photograph
Cleadon	Cleadon Mill; NZ 389 632	Tower		Early 19th century		
Easington	Jackson's Mill; NZ 409 437	Tower		1832	Windmill World	
Easington	Thorpe Moor Mill; NZ 412 422	Tower			Windmill World	
Elwick	New Mill; NZ 449 315	Tower			Windmill World	
Ferryhill	Dean Bank Mill; Broom Mill; NZ 276 326	Tower			Windmill World	
Fulwell	Fulwell Mill; NZ 392 595				Demolished c. 1821	
Fulwell	Fulwell Mill; NZ 392 595	Tower		c. 1821	Windmill World	
Gateshead	Windmill Hill Mill	Post		1898	1898	
Gateshead	Windmill Hill (6 mills in addition to that listed above)	Post			Last one demolished in 1890.	
Gateshead	Gateshead Mill; NZ 208 614	Tower			Windmill World	
Gateshead	Borough Mill; NZ 2494 6262	Tower		1837	Demolished July 1927.	
Newton Aycliffe	Heworth Mill; NZ 290 219	Tower			Windmill World	
Redworth	Redworth Mill; NZ 229 234	Tower			Windmill World	
Ushaw Moor	Ushaw Moor Mill; NZ 215 438	Tower		1817	Windmill World	
West Boldon	West Mill; NZ 354 612	Tower			Windmill World	
Whickham	Whickham Mill; NZ 210 610	Tower		c. 1720	Windmill World	
Whitburn	Whitburn Mill; NZ 407 625	Tower		1790	Windmill World	

=== Essex ===
See List of windmills in Essex

=== Gloucestershire ===
Location	Name of mill and grid reference	Type	Maps	First mention or built	Last mention or demise	Photograph
Almondsbury		Titt iron wind engine		c. 1894		
Almondsbury	ST 608 839		OS 1830	1777		
Arlingham	SO 715 108					
Barnwood	SO 841 180			1777		
Brimpsfield	SO 933 114		OS 1830	1824		
Bristol	Clifton Down Mill; ST 566 733	Tower		18th century	Converted to camera obscura, 1828. Windmill World	
Dursley	Cam Mills	Titt iron wind engine		1901		
Dursley		Titt iron wind engine		1898		
Dymock	SO 7090 2913	Smock mill				
Falfield	Falfield Mill; ST 6839 9299	Tower		1708	Windmill World	
Forthampton	(two mills)			1291	1291	
Forthampton				1636	1672	
Forthampton	Alcock's Mill; SO 868 324	Tower		1845	1859	
Forthampton	Mill Hill Mill			1759	1759	
Forthampton	Swinley Mill			1538	1544	
Frampton Cotterell	Frampton Cotterell Mill; ST 673 814	Tower		Late 18th or early 19th century	Windmill World	
Gloucester	SO 831 183	Post				
Gloucester	SO 832 185			1455		
Gloucester	SO 830 170			1624		
Hazleton	Grange Mill; SP 078 183	Tower			Windmill World	
Newent	Castle Hill Mill; SO 720 250	Smock		1920s	Windmill World	
Oddington	Martin's Hill Mill; SP 212 255	Tower			Windmill World	
Quinton	Lower Quinton Mill; SP 176 473	Tower		Early 19th century	Demolished spring 1951	
Siddington	Siddington Mill; SU 041 995	Tower		Late 18th century	Windmill World	
Tidenham	Folly Mill	Tower; ST 537 949			Windmill World	
Warmley	Warmley Mill; ST 667 727	Tower		18th century	Windmill World	

=== Greater London ===
See List of windmills in Greater London

=== Greater Manchester ===
Windmills that survive today within Greater Manchester. Historic windmills will be listed under Lancashire.

Location	Name of mill and grid reference	Type	Maps	First mention or built	Last mention or demise	Photograph
Haigh	Haigh Mill	Tower		1845		

=== Hampshire ===
See List of windmills in Hampshire

=== Herefordshire ===
Location	Name of mill and grid reference	Type	Maps	First mention or built	Last mention or demise	Photograph
Ledbury	Wellington Heath Mill; Approximately; SO 709 408	Post		1798	1885	
Moccas	Rollsford Mill; SO 361 419	Tower	1832; 1835	1832	Windmill World	
Ross-on-Wye	Waterworks	Titt iron wind engine				
Leinthall Starkes	Leinthall Starkes Mill; SO 444 698	Mock Smock			Windmill World	

=== Hertfordshire ===
See List of windmills in Hertfordshire

=== Isle of Wight ===
See List of windmills in the Isle of Wight

=== Kent ===
See List of windmills in Kent

=== Lancashire ===
See List of windmills in Lancashire

=== Leicestershire ===
See List of windmills in Leicestershire

=== Lincolnshire ===
See List of windmills in Lincolnshire, and Lincolnshire's windmills

=== Merseyside ===
Historical mills can be found under Cheshire and Lancashire.

Location	Name of mill and grid reference	Type	Maps	First mention or built	Last mention or demise	Photograph
Bidston	Bidston Windmill; SJ 287 894	tower		Late 18th century	Windmill World	
Gayton	Gayton Mill; SJ 278 812	Tower			Windmill World	
Great Crosby	Moor Lane Mill; SD 329 003	Tower		1813	Windmill World	
Lydiate	Forest's Mill; SD 380 039	Tower		1768	Windmill World	
Prescot	Acres Mill	Tower			1908	
St Helens	Ravenhead Mill; SJ 502 942	Tower		Late 18th century	Windmill World	
Wavertree	Wavertree Mill	Post		1452	1916; Windmill World	

Mock mill

Location	Name of mill and grid reference	Type	Maps	First mention or built	Last mention or demise	Photograph
Heswall	Heswall Windmill	Tower		Mid-1980s	Windmill World	

=== Norfolk ===
See List of windmills in Norfolk and List of drainage windmills in Norfolk

=== Northamptonshire ===
Location	Name of mill and grid reference	Type	Maps	First mention or built	Last mention or demise	Photograph
Barby	Barby Mill; SP 542 696	Tower		Early 19th century	Windmill World	
Blakesley	Quinbury End Mill; SP 623 504	Tower		1832	Windmill World	
Bozeat		Post			1937; Windmill World	
Braunston	Braunston Mill; SP 537 663	Tower		c. 1800	Truncated c. 1920; Windmill World	
Cottingham	SP 849 901			1536	1720; Windmill World	
Cottingham	Cottingham Mill; SP 849 901	Tower		Late 18th century	Truncated 1955; Windmill World	
Finedon	Finedon Mill; SP 907 724	Tower		c. 1818	Windmill World	
Great Brington		Titt iron wind engine		1894		
Hellidon	Hellidon Mill; SP 519 578	Tower		Late 18th or early 19th century	Windmill World	
Kingsthorpe	Kingsthorpe Mill; SP 756 639	Tower		Early 19th century	Windmill World	
Newnham	Newnham Mill; SP 575 610	Tower			Windmill World	
Rushden	Rushden Mill; SP 956 653	Smock			Windmill World	
Silverstone	Silverstone Mill; SP 674 443	Tower			Windmill World	
Strixton				13th century	13th century Windmill World	
Sulgrave	Sulgrave Mill; SP 554 459	Tower			Windmill World	
Tansor	Tansor Mill; TL 055 910	Tower		Mid-18th century	Windmill World	
Tansor	Tansor Crossroads				Windmill World	
West Haddon					Windmill World	
Wootton	Wootton Mill; SP 759 567	Tower			1902; Windmill World	

=== Northumberland ===
Location	Name of mill and grid reference	Type	Maps	First mention or built	Last mention or demise	Photograph
Acomb	NY 931 662	Tower		1720	Truncated early 19th century Windmill World	
Bamburgh	Castle Mill; NU 182 352	Tower		1835	Windmill World	
Belford	Spindlestone Ducket Mill; NU 147 335	Tower		18th century	Windmill World	
Berwick upon Tweed	Berwick Castle (two mills)			1333	Temporary mills, probably demolished 1335 when the Castle Mill, a watermill, was rebuilt.	
Berwick upon Tweed	Berwick Castle	Tower		C17th	Standing in 1833.	
Chollerton	NY 932 720	Tower			Windmill World	
Great Whittington	Whittington Mill; NZ 015 705	Tower		18th century	Windmill World	
Haggerston	NU 035 436	Tower			Windmill World	
Hartley	NZ 337 765	Tower				
High Callerton	Birney Hill Mill; NZ 147 697	Tower		18th century	Windmill World	
Hexham	Dipton Mill; NY 927 609	tower			Windmill World	
Newcastle	Chimney Mill; NZ 240 656	Smock		1782	Windmill World	
Newcastle	Heaton Mill; NZ 267 658	Tower		Early 18th century	Windmill World	
North Shields	Billy Mill; NZ 337 691	Tower				
Scremerston	NU 014 491	Tower				
Stannington	Plessey Mill; NZ 238 789	Tower		1749	Windmill World	
Woodhorn	Woodhorn Mill; NZ 298 893	Tower		Early 19th century	Windmill World	

Mock mill

Location	Name of mill and grid reference	Type	Maps	First mention or built	Last mention or demise	Photograph
South Dissington	NZ 129 695	Smock			Windmill World	

=== Nottinghamshire ===
See List of windmills in Nottinghamshire

=== Oxfordshire ===
See List of windmills in Oxfordshire

=== Rutland ===
Location	Name of mill and grid reference	Type	Maps	First mention or built	Last mention or demise	Photograph
Greetham	SK 951 131	Smock			Windmill World	
Ketton	Ketton Mill; SK 972 046	Tower			Windmill World	
Morcott	Morcott Mill; SK 930 001	Tower			Windmill World	
North Luffenham		Tower				
Oakham		Post				
Preston		Post			Demolished c. 1928	
Seaton	SP 907 976	Post			Demolished c. 1928; Windmill World	
South Luffenham	South Luffenham Mill; SK 947 025	Tower			Windmill World	
Whissendine	Whissendine Mill; SK 823 143	Tower		1809	Windmill World	

=== Shropshire ===
See List of windmills in Shropshire

=== Somerset ===
See List of windmills in Somerset

=== Staffordshire ===
See List of windmills in Staffordshire

=== Suffolk ===
See List of windmills in Suffolk

=== Surrey ===
See List of windmills in Surrey

=== Sussex ===
- List of windmills in East Sussex
- List of windmills in West Sussex

=== Tyne and Wear ===
Windmills standing today in Tyne and Wear, historic windmills are listed under Co Durham or Northumberland as appropriate.

Location	Name of mill and grid reference	Type	Maps	First mention or built	Last mention or demise	Photograph
Cleadon	Cleadon Mill; NZ 389 632	Tower		Early 19th century	Windmill World	
Fulwell	Fulwell Mill; NZ392 595	Tower		c. 1821	Windmill World	
Newcastle	Chimney Mill; NZ 240 656	Smock	1793 upminster	1782	Windmill World	
Whitburn	Whitburn Mill; NZ 210 610	Tower		1790	Windmill World	

=== Warwickshire ===
See List of windmills in Warwickshire

=== West Midlands ===
Windmills standing today in the West Midlands. Historical mills can be found under Staffordshire, Warwickshire and Worcestershire

Location	Name of mill and grid reference	Type	Maps	First mention or built	Last mention or demise	Photograph
Berkswell	Balsall Common Mill; SP 249 759	Tower		1826	Windmill World	
Chesterton, Warwickshire	Chesterton Windmill SP 347 593	Tower		1632		
Tettenhall Wood	Tettenhall Mill; SO 873 991	Tower	1818	1818		
Walsall	Highgate Mill; SP 017 975	Tower		1826	Windmill World	
Wightwick	Wightwick mill SO 871 981	Tower		1720		

Maps

- 1818 C & G Greenwood

=== Wiltshire ===
See List of windmills in Wiltshire

=== Worcestershire ===
Location	Name of mill and grid reference	Type	Maps	First mention or built	Last mention or demise	Photograph
Alvechurch	Weatheroak Hill Mill; SP 059 740	Tower	1821	1821	Windmill World	
Inkberrow	Holberrow Green Mill; SP 024 588	Tower	1821; 1832	1801	Windmill World	
Inkberrow	Stonepits Quarry Mill; SP 008 568	Tower		c. 1840	Windmill World	
Inkberrow	SP 038 587	Post		1832	Demolished 1880s	
Kempsey	Kempsey Mill	Tower		1854	Demolished 1875	
Redditch	Walkwood Common Mill; SP 027 647	Tower		1833	1848, gone by 1885	
Redditch	Approximately; SP 039 675	Vertical axis mill		c. 1780	Demolished c. 1889	
Stoke Heath	Danzey Green Mill; SO 951 682	Midlands post		1971	Windmill World	
Stourport-on-Severn	Areley Common Mill; SO 803 703	Tower		c. 1800	Windmill World	

Maps

- 1821 C & G Greenwood
- 1832 Ordnance Survey

=== Yorkshire ===
- List of windmills in the East Riding of Yorkshire
- List of windmills in North Yorkshire
- List of windmills in South Yorkshire
- List of windmills in West Yorkshire

== Northern Ireland ==
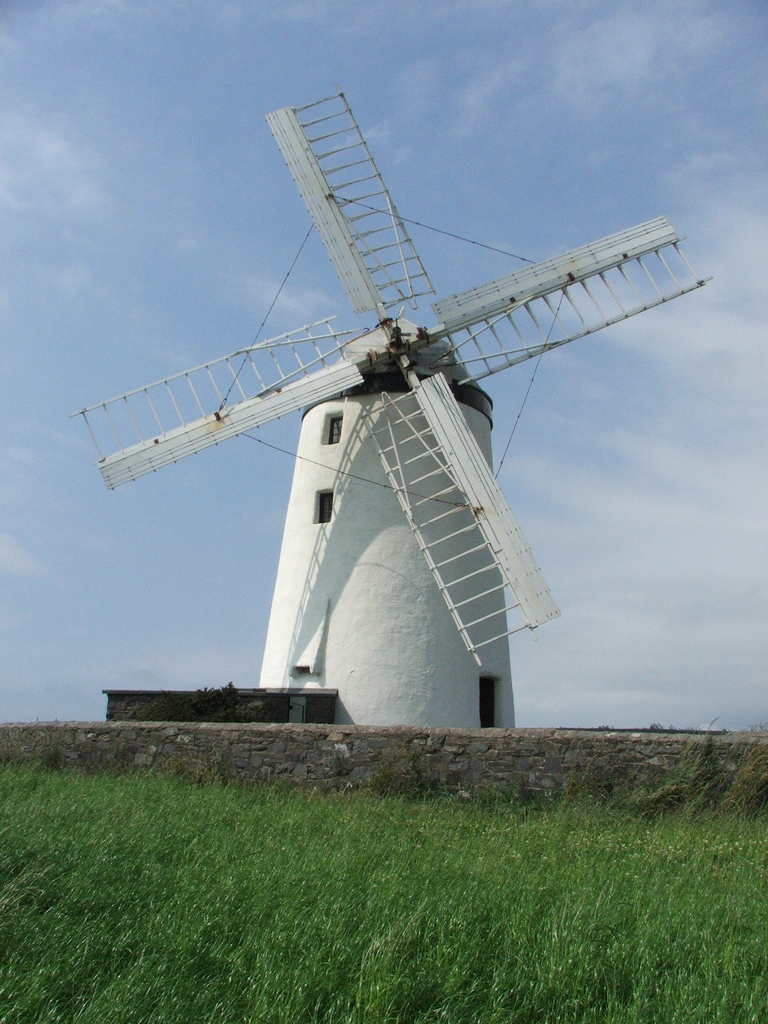
Ballycopeland Windmill in County Down, Northern Ireland

- See List of windmills in Northern Ireland

== Scotland ==
See List of windmills in Scotland

== Wales ==
See List of windmills in Wales

== See also ==
- Windmills in the Channel Islands
- Windmills in the Isle of Man
- Watermills in the United Kingdom
