= Union Mill =

Union Mill or Union Mills may refer to:

== British Isles ==
=== Communities ===
- Union Mills, a village on the Isle of Man

=== Windmills ===
- Union Mill, Appledore, a windmill in Kent
- Union Mills, Burnham Overy, a combined wind and watermill in Norfolk
- Union Mill, Beverley, a windmill in the East Riding of Yorkshire
- Union Mill, Cranbrook, a windmill in Kent
- Union Mill, Gainsborough, a windmill in Lincolnshire
- Union Mill, Gilberdyke, a windmill in the East Riding of Yorkshire
- Union Mill, Hackney, a windmill in Middlesex
- Union Mill, Lynstead, a windmill in Kent
- Union Mill, Onehouse, a windmill in Suffolk
- Union Mill, Whitby, a windmill in the North Riding of Yorkshire
- Union Mills, Thurning a windmill in Norfolk
- Boreas Union Mill, Pontefract, a windmill in the West Riding of Yorkshire

=== Watermills ===
- Union Mills, Burnham Overy, a combined wind and watermill in Norfolk

=== Textile mills ===
- Union Mills, Milnsbridge, Yorkshire
- Union Mills, Skipton, North Yorkshire

== United States ==
(by state)

Communities

- Union Mills, Indiana, an unincorporated community
- Union Mills, Iowa, an unincorporated community
- Union Mills, Maryland, an unincorporated community
- Union Mills, Virginia, an unincorporated community
- Union Mills, Pleasants County, West Virginia, an unincorporated community

Watermills

- Union Mills (Fall River, Massachusetts), listed on the National Register of Historic Places (NRHP)
- Union Mill Complex, Ballston Spa, NRHP-listed

Other

- Union Mills Homestead Historic District, Westminster, Maryland, NRHP-listed
- Union Mills Superintendent's House, Olympia, NRHP-listed in Thurston County
