= List of windmills in Wiltshire =

Extant windmills (blue) and former sites (red) in Wiltshire.
1 East Knoyle, 2 Chiseldon, 3 Great Bedwyn, 4 Swindon, 5 West Gomeldon

A list of all windmills and windmill sites which lie in the current ceremonial county of Wiltshire.

== Locations ==
Location	Name of mill and grid reference	Type	Maps	First mention or built	Last mention or demise	Photograph
Aldbourne				1311	1311	
Aldbourne	SU 270 761	Tower			Demolished 1900	
Amesbury	Amesbury Junction	Titt iron wind engine				
Boyton		Titt iron wind engine		1894		
Burderop	Burderop Estate	Titt iron wind engine		1899		
Bradford on Avon	Bradford Mill; ST 828 612	Tower		1808	Cap and sails blown off c. 1818; Windmill World	
Calne	Bowood House	Titt iron wind engine		1900		
Chiseldon	Saxon Mill; SU 170 799	Tower		Early to mid-19th century	Dismantled, moved to Swindon; Windmill World	
Chitterne	Elm Farm Mill; ST 999 443	Post		1841	1841	
Chute				1305	c. 1331	
Chute			1773	1773	Demolished 1930s	
Clyffe Pypard	Woodhill			14th century	Mid-17th century	
Codford St. Mary		Titt iron wind engine		1893		
Devizes	South Mill, Devizes Castle	Tower		c. 1720	Demolished c. 1840	
Devizes	North Mill, Devizes Castle; SU 001 614	Tower		c. 1720	Incorporated into Devizes Castle, 1860s Windmill World	
East Grafton				1593	1593	
East Knoyle	East Knoyle Mill; ST 874 310	Tower		c. 1800	Windmill World	
Foxhill		Titt iron wind engine		1896		
Fyfield	Fyfield Mill			Early 19th century	Demolished by 1842	
Gomeldon	Idmiston Mill; SU 177 358	Tower		Late 18th or early 19th century	Windmill World	
Great Bedwyn	SU 276 616	Post			Replaced by tower mill, 1821	
Great Bedwyn	Wilton Mill; SU 276 616	Tower		1821	Windmill World	
Heytesbury	Tytherington Estate	Titt iron wind engine		1893		
Heytesbury	Bolesbro' Knoll	Titt iron wind engine		1895		
Hilmarton				1348	1348	
Highworth	Hannington Hall	Titt iron wind engine		1898		
Ludgershall	Ludgershall Common	Post	1773; 1810	1773	1810	
Milton Lilbourne	Clench Mill		1773	1773	1773	
Ogbourne St Andrew				1589	1589	
Ogbourne St George				1294	1341	
Odstock		Titt iron wind engine		1886		
Pewsey				1810	1820, gone by 1839	
Salisbury		Titt iron wind engine		1890		
Savernake Forest	Chisbury Farm	Titt iron wind engine		1888		
Shrewton	Nett Road	Post		1793	1827, gone by 1899	
Shrewton	Maddington			1580s	1580s	
Shrewton	Maddington			1841	Demolished 1958	
Steeple Ashton				1371	1371	
Stourton	Search Farm	Titt iron wind engine		1888		
Stratton St Margaret				1291	1291	
Sutton Veny	The Beeches	Titt iron wind engine		1895		
Swindon				1324	1324	
Swindon	Windmill Street				gone by 1867	
Swindon	Okus Farm Mill			1849	Burnt down c. 1854	
Swindon	Swindon Works	Titt iron wind engine		1907		
Swindon	Chiseldon Mill; SU 106 835	Tower			Windmill World	
Tilshead	Tilshead Windmill	Post		1813	Demolished c.1905	
Tisbury	Pyt House	Titt iron wind engine		1888		
Urchfont				1884	1884	
Wanborough				1310	1310	
Westbury	Courtleigh	Titt iron wind engine		1892		
Winterbourne Monkton	west of village			c. 1265	Early 14th century	
Winterbourne Monkton				1530s	1540s	
Winterbourne Monkton				1815	1889	
Winterbourne Stoke	Hill Farm	Titt iron wind engine		1899		
Wootton Bassett	Wootton Manor Mill			1271	1334	
Wootton Bassett	Vastern Manor Mill			1271	1334	
Wootton Bassett	Wood Street		1773	1773	1773	
Wootton Bassett	north of Hunt's Mill (watermill)		1773	1773	Blown down 1781	
Yatesbury				1309	1310	

== Notes ==
Mills in bold are still standing. Known building dates are indicated in bold. Text in italics indicates that the information is not confirmed, but is likely to be as stated.

== Sources ==
- Andrews' and Dury's maps of Wiltshire, 1773 and 1810
