= Ashmansworth =

Village and parish in Hampshire, England

Coordinates: 51.316°N 1.403°W

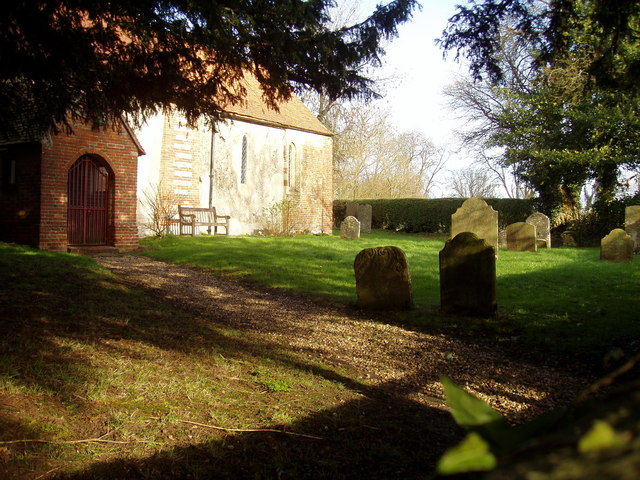
- St James' Church

- Location within Hampshire
- Population: 222 (2021 census)
- OS grid reference: SU4157
- Civil parish: Ashmansworth
- District: Basingstoke and Deane
- Shire county: Hampshire
- Region: South East
- Country: England
- Sovereign state: United Kingdom
- Post town: NEWBURY
- Postcode district: RG20
- Dialling code: 01635
- Police: Hampshire and Isle of Wight
- Fire: Hampshire and Isle of Wight
- Ambulance: South Central
- UK Parliament: North West Hampshire
- Website: Parish Council

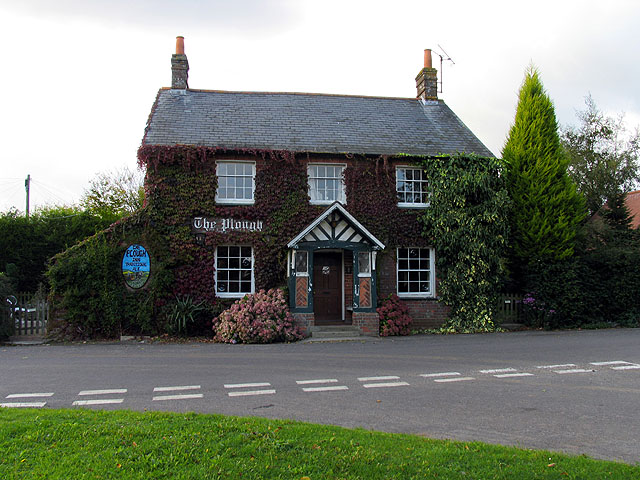
The Plough (former public house), photographed in 2005

Ashmansworth is a village and civil parish in the Basingstoke and Deane district of the English county of Hampshire. The village is about 8 miles (13 km) northeast of the town of Andover. The parish population at the 2021 census was 222. The parish has scattered settlements, including one unnamed hamlet and the village of Crux Easton.

== Geography ==
Ashmansworth village lies about 7 miles (11 km) southwest of Newbury in Berkshire, just southwest of the top of a ridge line running south. The ridge overlooks Highclere Castle and Newbury, with views over large areas of Berkshire and North Hampshire. With heights between 235 and 240 metres above sea-level, Ashmansworth is the highest village in Hampshire; a spot height of 242 metres (794 ft) at the top of the ridge on the northeast side of the village is one of the highest points in the county. It lies within the North Wessex Downs national landscape, and the area is popular with walkers, cyclists and horse riders.

The village is at the junction of five minor roads, about 1 km west of the A343 between Newbury and Andover.

The hamlet of Crux Easton lies around 1 mile south-east from Ashmansworth.

== History ==
=== Origins ===
Excavations at Church Farm indicate part of the hamlet was occupied in the Iron Age. The hamlet is also located in close proximity to the Oxdrove prehistoric route. Some Roman pottery fragments have been discovered in Ashmansworth.

Ashmansworth was granted as part of Whitchurch to the church of Winchester, some time in the 10th century. The first reference to Ashmansworth is in a charter dated 909, in which Edward the Elder returned the hamlet to the community. In 934, King Æthelstan (referring to the hamlet as Aescmaeres) directed that some of the land was to be put under the management of the bishop. It remained in possession of the bishopric until 1649.

Obadiah Sedgwick (and, from 1654, his son, Obadiah) was the lord of the manor from 1649 to the late 1600s, when it returned to the bishop. The manor was sold in 1802 to the Earl of Carnarvon.

=== 19th century ===
In 1811, a fire destroyed major parts of the village, along with parish records.

The population of Ashmansworth remained low during the 19th century. This was not helped by the restricted access to the land. A Black's Guide, published in 1871, described the village as being "among the least trodden districts and most secluded angles of the country, noteworthy only for its early English church".

An independent parish council for Ashmansworth was created in 1894. One of the first issues it addressed was the water supply. Throughout its history Ashmansworth experienced difficulties in maintaining an adequate supply of drinking water. Before the installation of piped water in the late 1930s, the only sources of drinking water for many villagers were Mere Pool and the 100 metres deep well at Church Farm.

== 20th century ==
In 1901, a spokesman for the Archaeological Society described Ashmansworth as "a long scattered village, neglected and deserted in its aspect, with a rapidly decreasing population". At this time the church had fallen into disrepair, probably as a result of it being subordinate to the East Woodhay parish.

Over the course of the 20th century, the character of Ashmansworth changed rapidly, largely as a result of the intensive farming practices adopted after the Second World War. The modern village has a central core, concentrated around the main thoroughfare where the village hall (built in 1952), village green, war memorial, former Plough Inn, former chapel and old schoolhouse are all located.

== Religious sites ==
The Church of England parish church of St James is in an isolated position, about 0.6 miles (1.0 km) south-west of Ashmansworth village. It was built around the middle of the 12th century, to which date the nave belongs; the chancel dates from the end of the same century. Windows have been inserted at various dates and the east wall was rebuilt in 1745. Wall paintings, mainly discovered in the 1800s and early 1900s, depict the life of Jesus, and probably date from the 1200s to the 1600s. The church is dedicated to Saint James the Great and is a Grade I listed building.

The 18th-century church of St Michael at Crux Easton is Grade II* listed.

== Amenities ==
The village was served for many years by the local public house, The Plough, which ceased trading in 2008.

== Notable residents ==
- George Bissill, artist
- Keith Chegwin, actor and presenter
- Gerald Finzi, composer
