= List of windmills in Devon =

A list of windmills in Devon.

== Locations ==
Location	Name of mill and grid reference	Type	Maps	First mention or built	Last mention or demise	Photograph
Abbotsham	Bowood Mill		1765; 1827	1765	1827	
Abbotsham	Tealter Mill			1695	Demolished c. 1817	
Alverdiscott				1603	1603	
Bere Ferrers				1637	1637	
Brixham	Little Rey Mill; SX 926 557	Tower		1797	1840; Windmill World	
Brixham	Furzeham Common Mill	Tower		1818	1838	
Broadclyst	Clyston Manor Mill; SX 991 966	Tower	1809; 1827	1786	Windmill World	
Cruwys Morchard				1553	1553	
Dartmouth		Post		c. 1700	c. 1700	
Exminster	Shillingford Mill			1835	1835	
Exmouth		Tower	1809	1797	Demolished 1849	
Galmpton Warnborough	SX 889 567	Tower	1827	c. 1810	Windmill World	
Holsworthy		Tower	1765	1765	Demolished c. 1890	
Instow	Church Mill; SS 482 312	Tower			Windmill World	
Instow	South Mill			1797	1797	
Littleham	Heale House	Titt iron wind engine				
Lundy	North Mill	Tower		17th century	Ruin by 1787	
Lundy	West Mill; SS 136 465	Tower		17th century	Windmill World	
Northam			1675	1609	1675	
Northam	Bidna Mill; SS 457 296	Tower		1806	Tower blown down 1919; Windmill World	
North Whilborough	Long Burrow Mill; SX 872 658	Tower			Windmill World	
Paignton	Fernacombe Mill; SX 875 624	Tower		1829	Windmill World	
Pilton				1594		
Petrockstowe	Heanton Mill; SS 491 103	Tower	1809	1756	Windmill World	
Plymouth	Devonport Mill			1751	Demolished 1762	
Plymouth	Devonport Mill	Tower	1827	1762	Demolished c. 1843	
Plymouth	Hoe Mill	Post		1564	1792	
Plympton St Mary				1561	1561	
Rackenford			1765	1765	1765	
Sandford	Dowrish Mill			Late 16th century	Late 16th century	
Shute	Shute House	Titt iron wind engine		1900		
Stokenham				1612	1612	
Teigngrace				1713	1713	
Teignmouth				1628	1727, demolished by 1759	
Topsham				1769	1790, demolished by 1817	
Torquay	Yaddon Down Mill; SX 908 658	Tower		1673	Windmill World	
Torquay	Chelston Mill			1823	1823	
Torquay	Fleet Mill			1808	1820	
Witheridge			1765	1765	1765	
Woodbury				1289	1289	
Woodbury Salterton				1549	1549	
Woolfardisworthy	Almiston Mill			c. 1840	c. 1840	

== Sources ==
Unless stated otherwise, the source for all entries is Minchinton, Walter (1977). Windmills of Devon. Exeter: Exeter Industrial Archaeology Group. ISBN 978-0-950177-86-1.

== Maps ==
- 1675 John Ogilby
- 1765 Benjamin Donn
- 1809 Ordnance Survey
- 1827 C & J Greenwood

== Notes ==
Mills in bold are still standing, known building dates are indicated in bold. Text in italics denotes indicates that the information is not confirmed, but is likely to be the case stated.
