= Obadiah Sedgwick =

English clergyman (c.1600–1658)

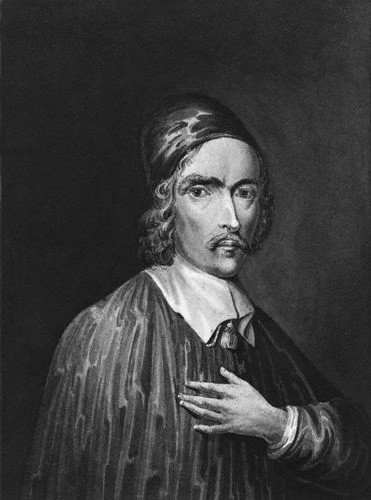
Sedgwick in a 19th-century watercolour

Obadiah Sedgwick (1600?–1658) was an English clergyman of presbyterian views, and a member of the Westminster Assembly.

== Life ==
He was the son of Joseph Sedgwick, vicar of St Peter's, Marlborough, Wiltshire, and then of Ogbourne St Andrew, and was born at Marlborough about 1600. He matriculated at Queen's College, Oxford, on 18 June 1619, aged 19, moved to Magdalen Hall, and graduated B.A. on 5 May 1620, M.A. 23 January 1623.

He was tutor (1626) to Sir Matthew Hale. Having taken orders, he became chaplain to Horace Vere, 1st Baron Vere of Tilbury, whom he accompanied to the Low Countries. Returning to Oxford, he commenced B.D. on 16 January 1630. His first preferment (1630) in the church was as lecturer at St Mildred, Bread Street, London, where his puritanism got him into trouble. On 6 July 1639 he was presented by Robert Rich, 2nd Earl of Warwick, to the vicarage of Coggeshall, Essex, in succession to John Dod.

On the opening of the Long Parliament he regained his lectureship at St Mildred's, and became known as a vigorous preacher against episcopacy. In May 1642, he was one of the preachers invited to address the House of Commons at St Margaret's, Westminster. In the autumn of 1642 he was chaplain to the regiment of foot raised by Denzil Holles. He was a member of the Westminster Assembly (1643), and in the same year was appointed a licenser of the press. On 6 October 1643 he spoke at the Guildhall, London in favour of the league with Scotland for the prosecution of the war, and his speech was published in Foure Speeches, 1646. In a sermon of September 1644 he preached for 'cutting off delinquents.' He held for a short time the rectory of St Andrew's, Holborn, on the sequestration (13 December 1645) of John Hacket; but next year (before May 1646) he was appointed to the rectory of St Paul's, Covent Garden, and resigned Coggeshall where John Owen succeeded him (18 August).

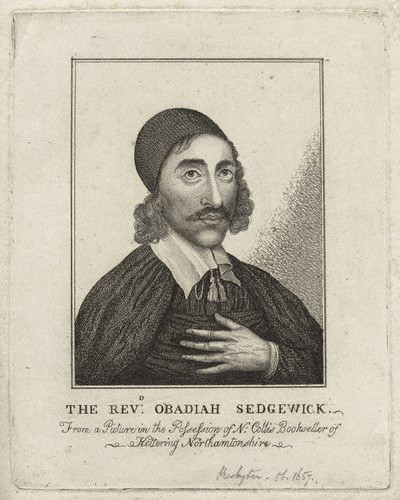
Sedgwick in an engraving from 1792

He was a member of the eleventh London classis in the parliamentary presbyterian system; but also on 20 March 1654 he was appointed one of Oliver Cromwell's 'triers,' and in August of the same year was a clerical assistant to the 'expurgators.' His health failing, he resigned St Paul's in 1656, and was succeeded by Thomas Manton, who is sometimes mistakenly referred to as his son-in-law. He was a man of property, being lord of the manor of Ashmansworth, Hampshire. Retiring to Marlborough, he died there at the beginning of January 1658, and was buried near his father in the chancel of Ogbourne St Andrew. By his wife Priscilla he had a son Robert, baptised at Coggeshall on 19 October 1641, who was a frequent preacher before parliament.

== Works ==
He published many sermons between 1639 and 1657. Besides these and a catechism, he published:

- Christ's Counsell to ... Sardis, 1640
- The Doubting Believer, 1641; 1653
- England's Preservation, 1642
- Haman’s Vanity, Displaying the birthlesse Issues of Church-destroying Adversaries 1643
- An Arke against a Deluge: or Safety in Dangerous Times, 1644
- A Thanksgiving-Sermon, 1644
- The Nature and Danger of Heresies, 1647
- Elisha His Lamentation, 1654
- The Humbled Sinner, 1656; 1660
- The Fountain Opened, 1657
- The Riches of Grace, 1657; 1658

Posthumous were:

- The Shepherd of Israel, 1658
- The Parable of the Prodigal, 1660
- The Anatomy of Secret Sins, 1660
- The Bowels of Tender Mercy, 1661
