= Crux Easton wind engine =

Grade II listed windmill in Crux Easton, Hampshire, England

Crux Easton Wind Engine
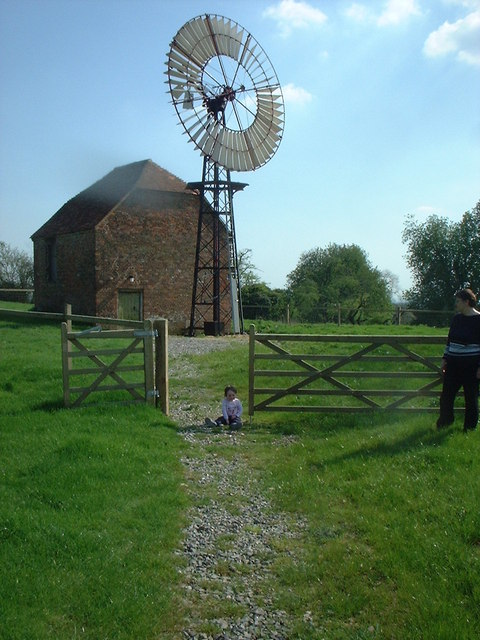
- The restored wind engine

Origin
- Mill name: Crux Easton Wind Engine
- Grid reference: SU 4267 5634
- Coordinates: 51.3046°N 1.3892°W
- Operator(s): Crux Easton Wind Engine Restoration Trust
- Year built: 1891

Information
- Purpose: Pumping mill, sawmill and corn mill
- Type: Simplex geared wind engine
- No. of sails: One sail
- Type of sails: Annular sail
- Winding: Fantail
- Fantail blades: Six blades
- No. of pairs of millstones: One pair
- Type of saw: Circular saw
- Other information: Built by John Wallis Titt

Crux Easton wind engine is a Grade II listed Titt wind engine, used as a windpump, at Crux Easton, Hampshire, England, which has been restored to working order.

== History ==
Erected for the Earl of Carnarvon in 1891. The wind engine pumped water from a well 410 feet (125 m) deep. It was last used in the 1920s. The sails were removed in the 1960s and placed in storage. Restoration of the wind engine was undertaken by Hampshire Industrial Archaeology Society and Hampshire Mills Group with assistance from the British Engineerium, Hove for the Crux Easton Wind Engine Restoration Trust. The restoration was funded by the Heritage Lottery Fund, which was asked to contribute £149,750 of the estimated £226,180 cost. Other grants were received from Basingstoke & Deane District Council, Hampshire County Council. and the Vodafone Charitable Trust. Restoration of the wind engine was delayed due to an outbreak of Foot and Mouth disease. The restored wind engine was officially opened on 25 September 2002 by Sir George Young.

== Description ==
Crux Easton wind engine is a Titt Simplex geared wind engine. It has a 20 feet (6.10 m) diameter sail mounted on a 35 feet (10.67 m) hexagonal steel tower. The annular sail has 48 blades, each one 5 feet (1.52 m) long. It is winded by a six blade fantail. The wind engine was primarily used for pumping water, but also drove a circular saw and a pair of millstones. The mill was capable of producing eight to ten sacks of flour (20 stone (130 kg) per day).
