= Weston, Dorset =

Village in Dorset, England

Coordinates: 50.53971°N 2.44729°W

Weston
- Location within Dorset
- OS grid reference: SY690721
- Unitary authority: Dorset
- Ceremonial county: Dorset
- Region: South West
- Country: England
- Sovereign state: United Kingdom
- Post town: PORTLAND
- Postcode district: DT5 1
- Dialling code: 01305
- Police: Dorset
- Fire: Dorset and Wiltshire
- Ambulance: South Western
- UK Parliament: South Dorset

Weston is a village in Tophill on the Isle of Portland, Dorset, England. It abuts the main village Easton. As with the rest of Portland's villages and settlements, Weston has been designated as a conservation area, as it is a place of special architectural and historic interest. The village was designated in 1994.

== History ==
The village grew up through the industry of agriculture, with Weston being surrounded by strip fields, also known as lawnsheds. It is likely that Roman occupation saw the development of Weston as a village, by establishing the various ponds and wells. Weston remained a small settlement for many centuries. From the 19th century, housing had caused the large expansion of many of Portland's villages, although Weston remained a small settlement. The early 20th century saw inland quarrying beginning to destroy some of Weston's surrounding fields.

The second half of the 20th century saw Weston undergo extensive changes, with the major expansion of the village. During the 1960s, large housing estates were placed on either side of the village, towards the western cliffs, and Easton village. The building of the Haylands housing estate commenced during the late 1960s. The construction of the Weston Estate at West Cliff was originally for the Admiralty, but was later sold as private housing. This estate continued to expand throughout the 1970s. Despite the expansion, Weston is still set amongst expansive fields to the east and south.

== Features ==
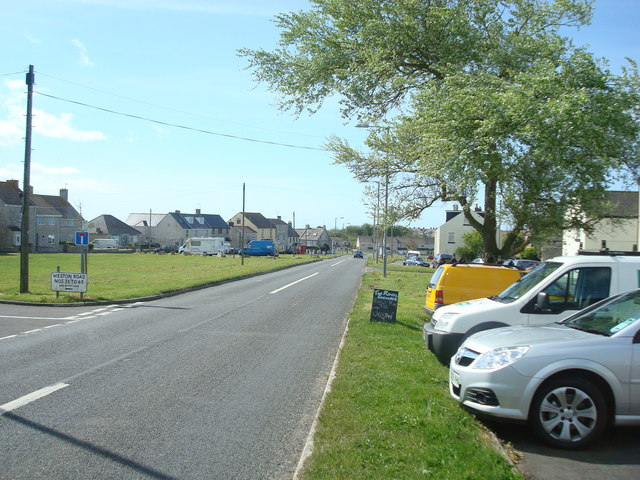
Part of Weston Road

The village features a small number of commercial business based along the main Weston Road. The top of Weston Road has the Royal Manor Arts College, which is Portland's only secondary school. It became a campus of the Isle of Portland Aldridge Community Academy in 2012, and closed in 2016, along with other schools on the island, to be replaced by a new school situated at Southwell Business Park. On this side of the road is a restored stone-walled Sheep Pound, once used by the Court Leet to impound straying sheep and cattle.

Along West Cliff, near the Weston Estate, Blacknor Fort was built around 1902 and the stronghold was equipped during both World Wars. The fort is now converted into a private clifftop residence. Further south, on the edge of the estate once stood ROC Post Portland Bill, which was operational from 1960 to 1991, and was demolished circa 2008.

To the north is Reforne, Easton, which holds St George's Church and St George's Centre - the former which can be seen from Weston. Close to the church, within Weston, is Portland's only public cemetery. To the east of the village, and near Easton, are the two Portland Windmills. The disused and historic stone towers date from as early as 1608. Both windmills have been separate Grade II Listed monuments since September 1978, and are the only historic windmill remains to survive in Dorset.

On the west side of Weston Road, opposite the Royal Manor School, is one of the few archaeological sites on the Isle of Portland. Remains of what is likely to be a Roman villa and high quality medieval building remains have been discovered. The ruins dating from the Iron Age, Roman and Medieval periods were unearthed during the topsoil clearance.

== Grade listed features ==
Weston has a wide array of architecture and buildings, a number of which are Grade Listed. High Croft Cottage (51 Providence Place), 53 Providence Place, Wanganui Cottage (71 Weston Road), 82-84 Weston Road, along with its attached wall, 64 Weston Road and its attached wall, and 72 Weston Road have all become Grade II listed. The row of houses consisting of 44, 44A, 46, and 48 Weston Street all make up what was once a farmhouse, and have become Grade II Listed.
