= List of windmills in Somerset =

This is a list of windmills in the English county of Somerset.

== Locations ==
=== A - B ===
Location	Name of mill and grid reference	Type	Maps	First mention or built	Last mention or demise	Photograph
Ashcott	ST 442 377		1736; 1760	1736	1760, gone by 1784	
Bawdrip	Approximately; ST 347 397		1660; 1675	1660	1675	
Bedminster	ST 592 714		1769	1769	1769	
Bedminster	ST 583 701		1769	1769	1769	
Berrow				1330s	1330s	
Berrow	ST 294 523	Tower	1782	1773	Demolished 1890s	
Bickenhall	Approximately; ST 282 180					
Bleadon	Bleadon Level		Early 17th century	Early 17th century		
Brent Knoll	Approximately; ST 335 516		1675	1330s	1675	
Brent Knoll	Shackleton's Mill; ST 332 509	Tower		1861	Demolished early 1900s	
Bridgwater	Stowey Farm	Titt iron wind engine		1893		
Bridgwater Without	ST 318 384	Sunk post		15th century	15th century	
Brockley	ST 473 661	Tower	1769; 1782	1529	1782, gone by 1829	
Burnham on Sea	ST 309 484	Post	1675	1675	1786	
Burnham on Sea	Allen's Mill; Sandway Mill; ST 309 484	Tower		1840s	Demolished June 1869	
Burnham on Sea	Burnham Brewery	Titt iron wind engine		1894		
Burnham Without	Blew Mill; Burnham Mill; Edithmead Mill; ST 337 490	Post	1675; 1760	1675	1885	
Burnham Without	Highbridge Mill; ST 322 485	Sunk post	1675	1675	1675	
Burnham Without	Approximately; ST 343 472	Post		1803	1867	
Burnham Without	Watchfield Mill; ST 348 470	tower	1817	1817	Windmill World	
Butcombe	ST 517 628	Sunk post		13th century	13th century	
Butleigh	Approximately; ST 513 324		1675; 1817	1675	1817	

=== C - E ===
Location	Name of mill and grid reference	Type	Maps	First mention or built	Last mention or demise	Photograph
Catcott	Catgut Mill approximately ST 388 383		1675	1675	1675	
Chapel Allerton	ST 414 504			1317	1736	
Chapel Allerton	Ashton Mill; ST 414 504	Tower		1774	Windmill World	
Charlton Horethorne	Approximately; ST 674 239				Demolished c. 1784	
Charlton Mackrell	(two mills); ST 516 292		1467	1467		
Charlton Mackrell	Baskett's Mill; ST 516 292	Tower		1592	1757, gone by 1810	
Chedzoy	ST 345 371	1817; 1822	Sunk post	1685	Blown down 7 December 1827	
Churchill, Somerset	Approximately; ST 445 601			1652	1652	
Compton Dundon	Approximately; ST 495 339		1675	c. 1660	1675	
Cossington	Approximately; ST 356 400		1675	1675	1675	
Croscombe		Titt iron wind engine		1899		
Curry Rivel	Willtown Mill; ST 388 246	Tower	1822	1822	Demolished c. 1930	
Curry Rivel	Week Mill; Wick Mill; ST 403 265	Sunk post	1760	1760	1775, gone by 1820	
Ditcheat	Blindmill approximately ST 627 341					
Durston	ST 294 280	Sunk post				
Durston	ST 297 278	Sunk post			Gone by 1817	
East Brent	ST 356 518	Post	1675; 1760; 1822	1675	c. 1880	
East Brent	Edingworth; ST 357 530	Post				

=== G - H ===
Location	Name of mill and grid reference	Type	Maps	First mention or built	Last mention or demise	Photograph
Glastonbury	Approximately; ST 519 390			1244	1309	
Glastonbury	Windmill Hill Mill approximately ST 505 395			Late 15th or early 16th century	Late 15th or early 16th century	
Glastonbury	Wearyall Hill Mill approximately ST 495 384		1660; 1675	1640	c. 1775	
Glastonbury	Common Moor Mill			1722	1722	
Glastonbury	The Elms	Titt iron wind engine		1892		
Greinton	Approximately; ST 417 371		1660; 1675	1660	1675, gone by 1742	
Hardington Mandeville	Approximately; ST 511 114					
High Ham	Stembridge Mill; ST 433 305	Tower		1822	Windmill World	
High Ham	Sedgemoor Hill Mill approximately ST 435 307		1660; 1760	1660	1779	
High Ham	Turn Hill Mill; ST 427 298		1660	1660	1660	
Hinton Charterhouse		Titt iron wind engine		1895		
Huish Episcopi	Bowden's Mill approximately ST 415 286	Tower		1874	Demolished c. 1885	
Huish Episcopi	Pibsbury Mill; ST 433 265		Tower	1823	Collapsed April 1915	
Huish Episcopi	Wearne Mill approximately ST 424 298		1660	1585	1664	
Hutton	ST 361 589			1309	1309	
Hutton	ST 361 589			1482	1482	
Hutton	Hutton Mill; ST 361 589		1809	1809	1864	
Hutton	Oldmixon Mill approximately ST 337 580		1736; 1760	1736	1760	

=== K - M ===
Location	Name of mill and grid reference	Type	Maps	First mention or built	Last mention or demise	Photograph
Kenn	Kenn Mill; ST 411 696			1821	Truncated c. 1900	
Kingsdon	Approximately; ST 512 269			1628	1694	
Langport	Big Mill approximately ST 422 268			1344	Blown down 16 January 1362	
Locking	Vale Mill; Locking Moor Mill; ST 359 617	tower		c. 1813		
Long Ashton				1312	1312	
Long Sutton	Upton Mill approximately ST 454 266			1349	1538	
Low Ham	Approximately; ST 443 285		1660	1660	Derelict in 1779	
Lympsham	Batch Farm Mill; ST 326 551	Tower		1758	1758	
Mark	ST 387 378			1700	Blown down 26 November 1703	
Mark	Mark Causeway				Blown down 26 November 1703	
Middlezoy	Approximately; ST 366 328		1660	1660	1660	
Middlezoy	Approximately; ST 366 328	Tower	1822	1822	1885	
Montacute	Approximately; ST 506 170			1560	1560	
Moorlinch	Knoll Hill Mill; ST 400 372	Post	1660; 1675; 1760	1660	1760	
Moorlinch	ST 400 372	Tower		Early 19th century	1889	

=== N - P ===
Location	Name of mill and grid reference	Type	Maps	First mention or built	Last mention or demise	Photograph
North Cheriton	Approximately; ST 686 258			1766	1766	
North Curry	ST 315 248			c. 1840	c. 1840	
Othery				1308	1346, gone by 1403	
Othery				1515	Demolished c. 1811	
Othery	Approximately; ST 377 313		1660	1598	1701	
Paulton	ST 656 567					
Pawlett						
Pawlett	Hams Mill; ST 277 411	Tower			Demolished 1880s	
Pitney				1605	1691	
Portbury	Okey Mill approximately ST 509 740		1769; 1782	1769	1782	
Portishead	Portishead Mill; ST 458 767	Tower		1832	Windmill World	
Puriton	Approximately; ST 319 411	Tower	1610; 1675; 1760	1610	Demolished early 20th century	
Puriton	Approximately; ST 325 409		1675	1675	1675	
Puriton	Approximately; ST 325 409		1817	1817	c. 1840	

=== S - U ===
Location	Name of mill and grid reference	Type	Maps	First mention or built	Last mention or demise	Photograph
St Cuthbert Out	Approximately; ST 577 474					
Seavington St Michael				c. 1212	c. 1212	
Shapwick	ST 422 373			1330s	1330s	
Shapwick	ST 422 373	Post	1660; 1760; 1782	1660	Blown down 29 November 1836	
Shapwick	ST 425 374	Tower		c. 1836	1860	
Somerton				1276	1330	
Somerton	Mileburgh approximately ST 480 275			1334	1484	
Somerton	South Field			1575	1619	
Somerton	Applin's Mill approximately ST 477 283		1736^{*} 1760	1715	1802	
Somerton	Crane's Mill approximately ST 490 275			1616	1779, gone by 1802	
Somerton	William Champion's Mill			1651	1651	
Somerton	South Hill Mill; Cullen's Mill approximately ST 471 271		1675	1675	1749	
Stawell, Somerset	Approximately; ST 368 389		1660; 1675	1660	1675	
Stawell	Cock Hill Mill; Stoll Mill approximately ST 376 387		1675	1675	1675	
Stawell	Sutton Mill; ST 369 365			1685	1685	
Stockland Bristol	(two mills); ST 249 439			1317	1317	
Stoke St Gregory	ST 339 277					
Stoke St Gregory	ST 354 269	Tower		1704	1787	
Street				c. 1255	c. 1255	
Street	Millfield Mill approximately ST 492 362		1660; 1675	1660	1675	
Street	Ivythorn Mill approximately ST 477 345		1822	1822	1822	
Uphill	Uphill Mill; ST 317 583	Tower	1782	1782	Truncated 1934; Windmill World	

=== W ===
Location	Name of mill and grid reference	Type	Maps	First mention or built	Last mention or demise	Photograph
Walton				1342	1342	
Walton	Walton Mill; ST 462 352	Post	1660; 1675	1660	Collapsed c. 1725	
Walton	Walton Mill; ST 462 352	Tower		1741	Windmill World	White circular building with three windows, surrounded by vegetation.
Weare	Weare Mill; ST 406 515		1760	1760	Windmill World	
Wedmore	Maltfield Farm Mill; ST 441 474	Tower	1760; 1782	1760	Demolished 1886	
Wedmore	ST 425 428	Post		1678	Moved to Mark, 1700	
Wedmore	Burnt Mill approximately ST 426 509					
Wedmore	Heath House Mill; ST 421 469			1737	Burnt down c. 1740	
Wedmore	Heath House Mill; Westfield Mill; ST 421 469	tower		1775	Demolished 1962	
Wedmore	Stoughton Mill; ST 419 487	Tower	1817	1817	1875	
West Huntspill	Approximately; ST 310 453		1675	1675	1675	
West Monkton	(two mills)			1364	Mid-16th century	
West Monkton	Burlinch Mill; ST 265 295	Tower	1817			
West Monkton	Woodball Mill; ST 255 293					
West Pennard	Approximately; ST 560 382			1362	1362	
Westonzoyland				1330s	1330s	
Westonzoyland	Penzoy Mill; ST 339 350		1822	1822	1822	
Westonzoyland	Westonfield Mill approximately ST 365 346			1833	1833	
Williton	Great Mill approximately ST 102 342					
Winford	Broadfield Mill; ST 515 649	Tower		1880s	Windmill World	
Woolavington	(two mills)			1222	1222	
Woolavington	ST 347 408		1736; 1760; 1783; 1822	1630	Demolished 1967	
Worle	Worle Mill; ST 352 632	Tower	1760; 1782	1760	Windmill World	
Worlebury	Approximately; ST 326 627		1736; 1760	1736	1760	

== Maps ==
- 1660 Newcourt
- 1675 John Ogilby
- 1736 John Kirby
- 1736^{*} Strachey
- 1760 Bowen
- 1769 Donn
- 1782 Day & Masters
- 1783 Joseph Hodgkinson
- 1822 C & J Greenwood
- 1825 C & J Greenwood
- 1817 Ordnance Survey
- 1826 Andrew Bryant
- 1838 Ordnance Survey

== Notes ==
Mills in bold are still standing, known building dates are indicated in bold. Text in italics denotes indicates that the information is not confirmed, but is likely to be the case stated.

== Sources ==
Unless otherwise indicated, the source for all entries is Coulthard, Alfred J, and Watts, Martin (1978). Windmills of Somerset and the men who worked them. London: The Research Publishing Co. ISBN 0-7050-0060-5.
