= List of windmills in County Down =

This is a list of windmills in County Down, Northern Ireland.

== Locations ==
Location	Name of mill and coordinate	Type	Maps	First mention or built	Last mention or demise	Photograph
Ardkeen				1836	1836	
Ballyagherty				1779	1779	
Ballybohillbo	Ballybohillbo Mill					
Ballydugan				1792	1792	
Ballygrainey				1836	1836	
Ballyhalbert	Ballyhalbert Mill	Tower			Demolished 1940; Windmill World	
Ballyherley				1836	1836	
Ballyherley	(2nd mill)			1836	1836	
Ballyholme	Ballyholme Mill				Burnt down 9 July 1922; Windmill World	
Ballykeel				1834	1834	
Ballymaconell				1836	1836	
Ballymenagh				1834	1834	
Ballyministragh				1836	1836	
Ballyorgan				1836	1836	
Ballyrogan				1836	1863	
Ballyskeagh				1836	1836	
Ballytrustan				1836	1836	
Ballywalter				1681	1681	
Ballywalter	Ballyferis Mill; 54°32′45″N 5°29′17″W	Tower		19th century	Windmill World	
Balloo	Ballyminstragh Mill	Tower				
Boardmills	Boardmills Mill; 54°28′12″N 5°55′43″W	Tower		1813	Windmill World	
Carrowmacaw				1836	1836	
Cattogs				1836	1836	
Cloghey	Cloghey Mill; 54°26′21″N 5°27′56″W	Tower		1836	Windmill World	
Crawfordsburn	Crawfordsburn Mill; 54°39′40″N 5°43′33″W	Tower		1830	Windmill World	
Cullentra				1836	1826	
Dunoraver				1836	1836	
Ganaway				1836	1836	
Greyabbey	Ballybryan Mill; 54°31′11″N 5°32′57″W	Tower		19th century	Windmill World	
Holywood	Holywood Mill; 54°38′33″N 5°49′40″W	Tower			Windmill World	
Killinchy	Killinchy Mill; 54°27′08″N 5°39′55″W	Tower		c. 1702	Windmill World	
Killough	Killough Mill; 54°15′15″N 5°38′45″W	Tower		1823	Windmill World	
Killyleagh	Ringdufferin Mill	tower				
Killyleagh	Ringdufferin Mill (2nd mill)					
Kirkistown	Kirkistown Mill	Tower				
Knockinelder	Knockinelder Mill; 54°23′07″N 5°28′08″W	Tower			Windmill World	
Lisbane				1836	1836	
Lisboy				1836	1836	
Millisle	Ballycopeland Mill; 54°36′28″N 5°33′22″W	Tower		c. 1785	Windmill World	
Newtownards	Newtownards Mill; 54°36′52″N 5°41′18″W	Tower			Windmill World	
Portaferry	Portaferry Mill; 54°22′47″N 5°32′28″W	Tower			Windmill World	
Poyntzpass	Poyntzpass Mill	Tower			Windmill World	
Saintfield	Glassdrumman Windmill; 54°27′51″N 5°49′30″W	Tower		1803	1839	
Tullyboard				1836	1836	
Tullykevin	Tullykevin Mill					
Warrenpoint	Ringmackilroy Mill	Tower			1802	
Whitechurch				1836	1836	

== Sources ==
Unless otherwise stated, the source for all entries is the linked Windmill World webpage.

== See also ==
- List of windmills in Ireland
