= List of windmills in Ireland =

This is a list of windmills in Ireland, split by the thirty-two counties that comprise the island.

== Locations ==
=== Cork ===
Location	Name of mill and coordinate	Type	Maps	First mention or built	Last mention or demise	Photograph
Cork	Bruce College	tower		Late C18th/early C19th	Truncated and converted	
Drinagh					Pumping windmill. Destroyed by fire 26 October 1856.	

=== Donegal ===
Location	Name of mill and coordinate	Type	Maps	First mention or built	Last mention or demise	Photograph
Murlough	Ballindrait Mill	Tower mill		1874		

=== Down ===
See List of windmills in County Down

=== Dublin ===
Location	Name of mill and coordinate	Type	Maps	First mention or built	Last mention or demise	Photograph
Castleknock	Castleknock Windmill	Tower		Late C18th/early C19th		
Dalkey	Dalkey Quarry	Wind engine		1860	Late 19th century Windmill World	
Dublin	St Patrick's Mill; 53°20′38″N 6°17′02″W	Tower		c. 1757	Windmill World	
Garristown	Garristown Mill; 53°33′47″N 6°23′38″W	Tower			Windmill World	
Rathcoole	Windmill Hill; 53°16′16″N 6°30′11″W	Tower		The mill now standing is of eighteenth-century date but it stands on the site of an earlier mill mentioned in 1413. (Note: the only windmill in South Dublin county)		
Rush	Rush Windmill	Tower		Late C18th/early C19th		
Skerries	Shallock Hill Mill; 53°34′28″N 6°06′48″W	Tower		1578	Windmill World	
Skerries	Great Mill; 53°34′30″N 6°06′37″W	Tower		Late 18th century	Windmill World	

=== Galway ===
Location	Name of mill and coordinate	Type	Maps	First mention or built	Last mention or demise	Photograph
Carrowreagh East	Carrowreagh Windmill	Tower		Mid C18th		
Castlegar, County Galway	Castlegar Windmill	Tower		C.1750		
Kinvara	Kinvara Windmill	Tower	1839	Late C18th		
Newtowneyre	Newtowneyre Windmill	Tower		C.1780		
Tuam	Gold Cave Crescent Windmill	Tower		Mid C18th		

=== Kerry ===
Location	Name of mill and coordinate	Type	Maps	First mention or built	Last mention or demise	Photograph
Tralee	Blennerville Mill; 52°15′24″N 9°44′14″W	Tower		1800	Windmill World	

=== Kilkenny ===
Location	Name of mill and coordinate	Type	Maps	First mention or built	Last mention or demise	Photograph
Croan	Croan Mill; 52°28′40″N 7°16′06″W	Tower	1839	1839	Windmill World	

=== Laois ===
Location	Name of mill and coordinate	Type	Maps	First mention or built	Last mention or demise	Photograph
Capard	Capard Windmill	Tower		c.1840		

=== Limerick ===
Location	Name of mill and coordinate	Type	Maps	First mention or built	Last mention or demise	Photograph
Limerick	Windmill Street Mill	Tower		Late C18th	Burnt out, 15 November 1814, tower demolished c.1915.	
Limerick	Ennis Road Mill			Demolished 1811.		
Limerick	Ballinacurra Mill	Tower		1800	Working in 1849	
Shannongrove	Shannongrove Windmill	Tower		1735		

=== Londonderry ===
Location	Name of mill and coordinate	Type	Maps	First mention or built	Last mention or demise	Photograph
Knockclogrim	Knocklogrim Mill; 54°49′00″N 6°36′49″W	Tower		1860	Windmill World	
Limavady	Limavady Junction	Titt iron wind engine				

=== Longford ===
Location	Name of mill and coordinate	Type	Maps	First mention or built	Last mention or demise	Photograph
Elfeet	Elfeet Windmill	Tower		c.1770.		
Lanesborough	Knock Windmill	Tower		c.1750.		

=== Louth ===
Location	Name of mill and coordinate	Type	Maps	First mention or built	Last mention or demise	Photograph
Ardee	Christians Hill Mill; 53°52′14″N 6°31′24″W	Tower	1778	1778	Gone by 1835; Windmill World	
Dundalk	Carnanbregagh Mill; 53°58′45″N 6°25′29″W	Tower	1778	1778	Windmill World	
Dundalk	Seatown Mill; 54°00′21″N 6°23′21″W	Tower		1790s	Windmill World	
Moneyveg	Moneyveg Windmill	Tower		1837		
Pepperstown	53°53′15″N 6°31′53″W	Tower			Windmill World	
Piperstown	53°46′59″N 6°20′23″W	Tower		1756	Windmill World	
Termonfeckin	Termonfeckin Mill; 53°46′02″N 6°16′13″W	Tower	1778	1778	Windmill World	
Whitemill	Whitemill Mill; 54°02′41″N 6°23′41″W	Tower			Windmill World	

=== Meath ===
Location	Name of mill and coordinate	Type	Maps	First mention or built	Last mention or demise	Photograph
Balrath	Balrath Mill; 53°37′24″N 6°28′50″W	Tower			Windmill World	
Bartramstown	Bartramstown Mill; 53°35′36″N 6°22′40″W	Tower			Windmill World	
Corballis	Corballis Mill; 53°40′17″N 6°15′24″W	Tower	1836	1836	Windmill World	
Stameen	Stameen Mill; 53°42′57″N 6°17′47″W	Tower			Windmill World	

=== Monaghan ===
Location	Name of mill and coordinate	Type	Maps	First mention or built	Last mention or demise	Photograph
Ballymackney	Ballymackney Mill; 53°57′35″N 6°39′25″W	tower	1778	Mid C18th	Windmill World	
Carrickmacross	Carrickmacross Windmill		Tower	Mid C18th		
Carrivetragh	Carrivetragh Mill; 54°12′28″N 7°13′46″W	Tower			Windmill World	
Drummulla	Drummulla Windmill		Tower	c.1760		
Dunaree	Dunaree Windmill		Tower	Late C19th		
Lisnamore	Lisnamore Windmill		Tower	c.1790		

=== Offaly ===
Location	Name of mill and coordinate	Type	Maps	First mention or built	Last mention or demise	Photograph
Cloghan Beg	Cloghan Beg Mill; 53°10′03″N 8°01′21″W	Tower			Windmill World	

=== Roscommon ===
Location	Name of mill and coordinate	Type	Maps	First mention or built	Last mention or demise	Photograph
Correal	Lobinroe Mill	Tower		c. 1750	Windmill World	
Elphin	Elphin Mill; 53°51′07″N 8°12′19″W	Tower		c. 1730	Windmill World	
Rindoon		Post				
Rindoon	St John's Woods	Tower				

=== Waterford ===
Location	Name of mill and coordinate	Type	Maps	First mention or built	Last mention or demise	Photograph
Ballinvella	Ballinvella Mill	Tower			Windmill World	

=== Wexford ===
Location	Name of mill and coordinate	Type	Maps	First mention or built	Last mention or demise	Photograph
Ballyharty	Ballyharty Windmill	Tower		1840		
Ballyseskin	Ballyseskin Windmill	Tower		1749		
Bargy	Bargy Windmill	Tower		1840		
Clonmines	Clonmines Windmill	Tower		C18th/early C19th		
Drinagh South	Drinagh Windmill	Tower		1840		
Enniscorthy	Vinegar Hill Mill; Templeshannon Mill; 52°30′05″N 6°33′12″W	Tower		1798	Windmill World	
Hardygregan	Tagunnan Windmill	Tower		1829		
Hook Peninsula	Hook Mill	Tower			Windmill World	
Chapel, Kilmore	Chapel Mill; 52°11′05″N 6°34′22″W	Tower		1836	Windmill World	
Kiltra	KiltraWindmill	Tower		mid/late C19th		
Mullanour	52°18′42″N 6°32′04″W	Tower			Windmill World	
Rath	Rath Windmill	Tower		1777		
Rosslare Harbour	Tagoat Mill; 52°14′43″N 6°23′02″W	Tower		Modern replica built as part of the Yola Farmstead Folk Park, opened in 1969	Windmill World	
Soughnane	Boley's Crossroads Windmill	Tower		1840		
Tacumshane	Tacumshane Mill; 52°12′32″N 6°25′28″W	Tower		1846	Windmill World	

== Maps ==
- 1778 Taylor & Skinner's map of Louth
- 1836 Ordnance Survey
- 1830 Ordnance Survey

== Notes ==
Mills in bold are still standing, known building dates are indicated in bold. Text in italics denotes indicates that the information is not confirmed, but is likely to be the case stated.

== Sources ==
- Unless stated otherwise, the sources for these entries are Windmill World, Eire mills and Windmill World, Northern Ireland mills
- Creggan, Michael; Minogue and Associates; Aegis Archaeology; Geoscience Ltd (1 May 2021). "South Dublin County Development Plan 2022-2028. Appendix 9 - Draft Landscape Character Assessment (LCA) of South Dublin County" (PDF).
