= Copehill Down =

Training facility in Wiltshire, England

- Part of Salisbury Plain Training Area
- Near Warminster, Wiltshire in England
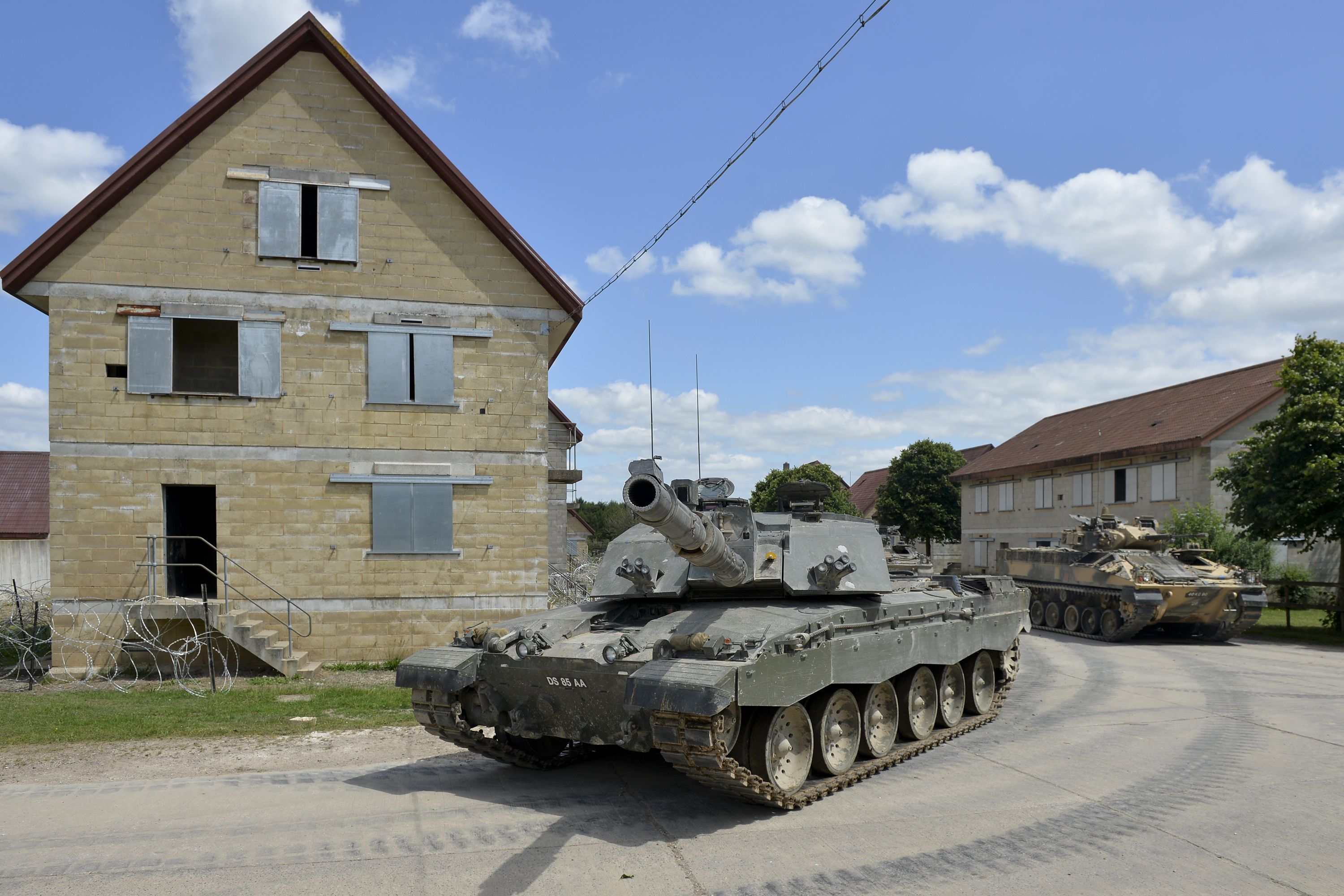
- Armoured vehicles during a training exercise at Copehill Down

Site information
- Type: Urban warfare training facility
- Owner: Ministry of Defence
- Operator: Defence Infrastructure Organisation
- Controlled by: Defence Training Estate
- Condition: Operational

Location
- Location in Wiltshire
- Coordinates: 51.2069°N 1.9770°W

Site history
- Built: 1987
- In use: 1987 – present

Copehill Down is a Ministry of Defence training facility near Chitterne on Salisbury Plain, Wiltshire, England. It is a 'FIBUA' (Fighting In Built Up Areas) urban warfare and close quarters battle training centre, where exercises and tests are conducted. The site lies in open ground in the northeast of Chitterne parish, between Chitterne and Tilshead, at Ordnance Survey grid reference SU017453.

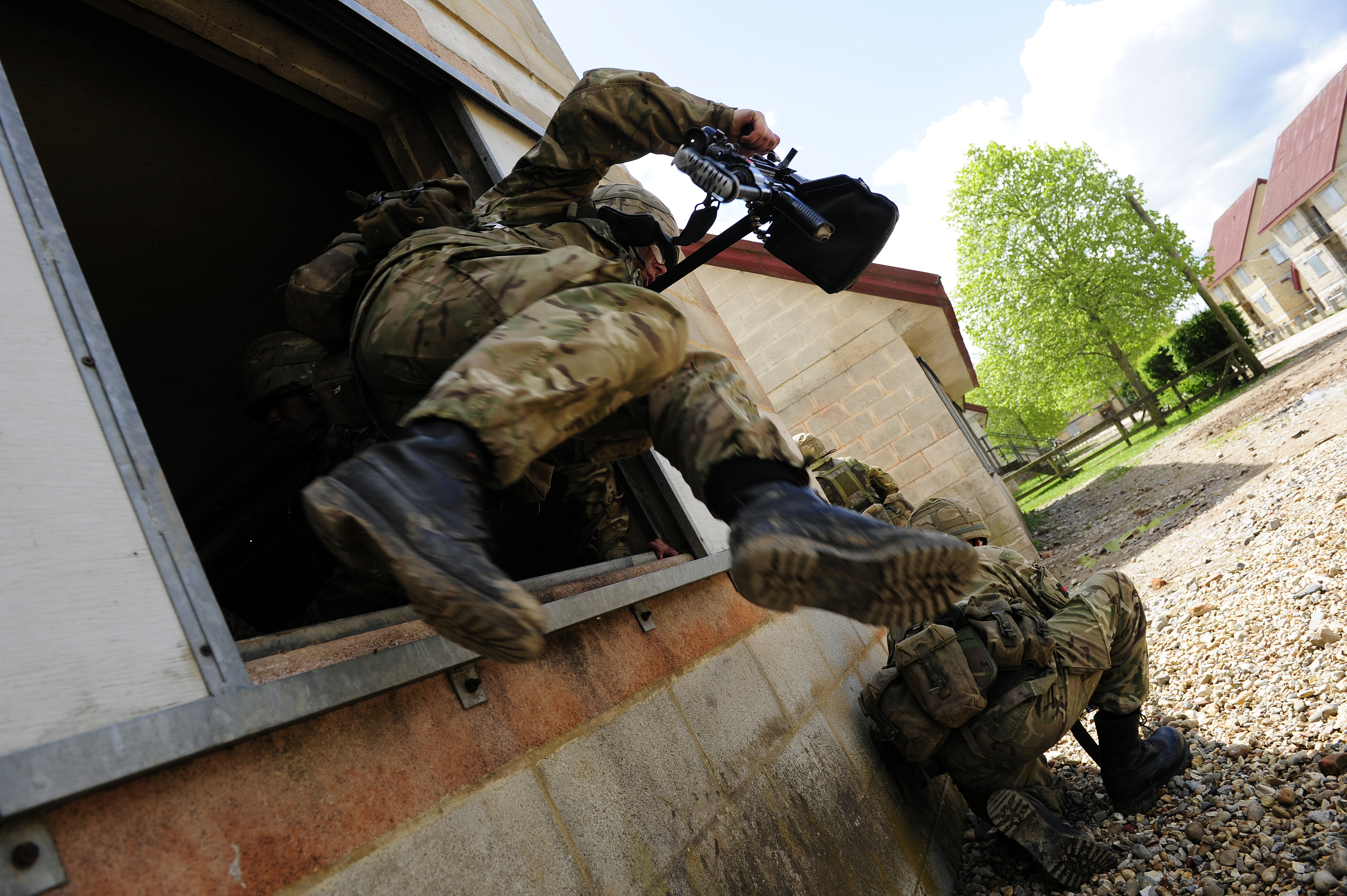
Soldiers training at Copehill Down

== History ==
The facility was built to resemble a German village in Bavaria, to provide troops with a simulated backdrop when training for operations in European theatres including the Cold War, the Balkans and Northern Ireland, and was completed in 1987.

The facility includes a shanty town stacked and laid out in rows of tightly packed streets, to provide an additional training area that more closely resembles the Army's operational theatres in Afghanistan and Iraq. There is also some rolling stock.

The Copehill Down training area is open for public access. Non-combat access to the FIBUA village is restricted, but has been used for airsoft wargaming and by historical reenactment societies, which take part in private reenactments of battles.
