= Stembridge Mill, High Ham =

Thatched windmill in High Ham, UK

Stembridge Tower Mill
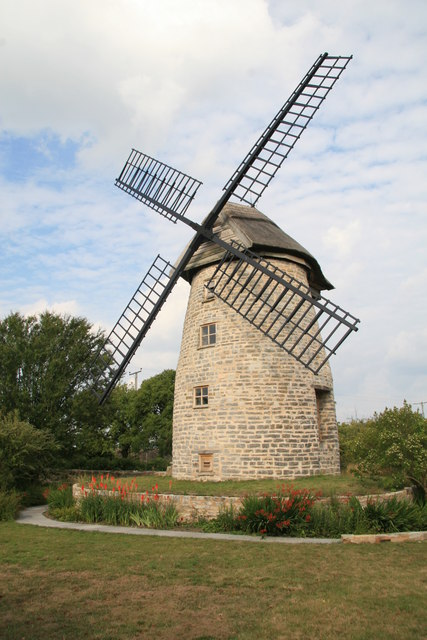
- Interactive map of Stembridge Tower Mill

Origin
- Mill location: High Ham, Somerset, England
- Grid reference: ST432305
- Coordinates: 51.0713°N 2.8107°W
- Operator: The National Trust
- Year built: 1822

Information
- Purpose: Corn mill
- Type: Tower mill
- Storeys: Four storey tower
- No. of sails: 4
- Type of sails: Common sails
- Windshaft: Wood, with a cast iron cross
- Winding: Wheel and chain
- Auxiliary power: Formerly had a steam engine
- No. of pairs of millstones: 2
- Size of millstones: 4 feet 0 inches (1.22 m) diameter
- Other information: Restored 1971/74 and 2009

Stembridge Tower Mill in High Ham, Somerset, England, is the last remaining thatched windmill in England. The mill is a grade II* listed building.

The stone tower mill was built in 1822 with four floors and a thatched "cap". A steam engine was installed in 1894, and became the mill's sole source of power after a storm damaged it in 1897 or 1898. Commercial use ended in 1908. The mill is now owned by The National Trust. In 2009, it underwent a £100,000 restoration by local craftsmen funded by the Grantscape Community Heritage Fund, and was re-opened later that year.

== History ==
Stembridge Mill was constructed for Robert Tatchell in 1822. It incorporated parts from the earlier Ham Mill, a few hundred yards to the north east. The mill has a 26 feet (7.9 m) tower situated on an old mill mound, surrounded by a low wall intended to keep people and livestock away from the sails.

Tatchell leased the mill to his son-in-law John Sherrin, who inherited the mill in 1824 following Tatchell's death. When Sherrin died, the mill passed to his three sons, although only one, Robert, worked the mill. Simon Spearing became the miller in 1869. He was later assisted by his son William, who lost an arm when he was thirteen due to an accident at a watermill in Low Ham. The mill was acquired by Adam Sherrin in 1881 and owned by his family until 1902. By the late 1880s, the mill was being rented by George Parker. He added a portable steam engine as auxiliary power. It drove one pair of stones. The mill was damaged by storms in 1897 or 1898 and after that was only powered by the steam engine, which had been installed in 1894, rather than the wind. The bakehouse ceased to be used around this time.

Robert Hook then acquired the mill. Unable to compete against grain imports and the building of dockside mills at Avonmouth, Stembridge Mill was last used commercially in 1908. Hook sold the mill and 5 acres (2.0 ha) of land to Dr. Hugh Hale Leigh Bellot for £500. Upon his death in 1928, it was inherited by his son, Professor Hugh Hale Bellot. In 1969 Professor Bellot left the windmill, miller's cottage and garden to the National Trust in his will. New sails were added in 1971, along with other repairs. Further repairs were carried out in 1974, including the removal of floors. It was designated as a grade II* listed building in 1986.

It is the last survivor of five windmills that once existed in the area.

In 2009 the sails were replaced and the mill re-thatched and restored by local craftsmen at a cost of a £100,000; the mill was re-opened later that year. The work was funded by the Grantscape Community Heritage Fund. Although the sails do not rotate with the wind, they are moved 90 degrees four times per year for maintenance. Before the restoration work was undertaken surveys revealed that the mill was used as a roost for long-eared and lesser horseshoe bats. It was ensured that the bats would still have access after the restoration.

== Description ==
Note: Italicized terms are defined in the mill machinery article.

Stembridge Mill is a tower mill, a type of windmill which consists of a brick or stone tower, on top of which sits a roof or cap which can be turned to bring the sails into the wind. The advantage of the tower mill over the earlier post mill is that it is not necessary to turn the whole mill ("body", "buck") with all its machinery into the wind; this allows more space for the machinery and storage. In the earliest tower mills the cap was turned into the wind with a long tail-pole which stretched to the ground at the back of the mill. Later, a looping chain was used which turned the cap with gears, as is used at Stembridge. It is winded by a wheel and chain. The windshaft is of wood, with a cast iron cross, which carries four common sails. The brake wheel is of clasp arm construction. No other machinery remains, since the wallower, upright shaft and great spur wheel were removed after the mill ceased to operate by wind

The mill has four floors, a thatched cap and is constructed of local limestone known in the area as Blue Lias. It has two pairs of 4-foot (1.22 m) diameter millstones. One pair is French Burr stones, which date from 1859. The other pair has a French Burr runner stone on a conglomerate bedstone. Both pairs of millstones were originally driven overdrift by the windmill, with the mixed pair later being driven underdrift by the steam engine, which also drove a wire machine. The remains of the old bakehouse can be seen at the rear of the mill.

== Millers ==
The following millers worked Stembridge Mill:

- John Sherrin (1822–?)
- Robert Sherrin (1861–69)
- Simon Spearing (1869–?)
- Joseph Loader (1879–81)
- George Parker (1889–97)
- Frank Parker (1897–98)
- Robert Mead (1898–?)
- F. G. Harding (post 1898)
- Mr. Hill (post 1898)

== See also ==
- List of National Trust properties in Somerset
- List of windmills in Somerset
