= Crux Easton =

Village and parish in Hampshire, England

Coordinates: 51.30423°N 1.39029°W

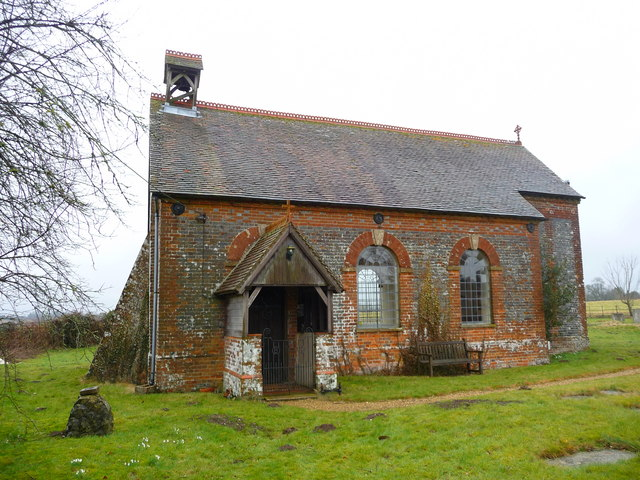
- St Michael and All Angels' parish church

- Location within Hampshire
- Civil parish: Ashmansworth
- District: Basingstoke and Deane
- Shire county: Hampshire
- Region: South East
- Country: England
- Sovereign state: United Kingdom

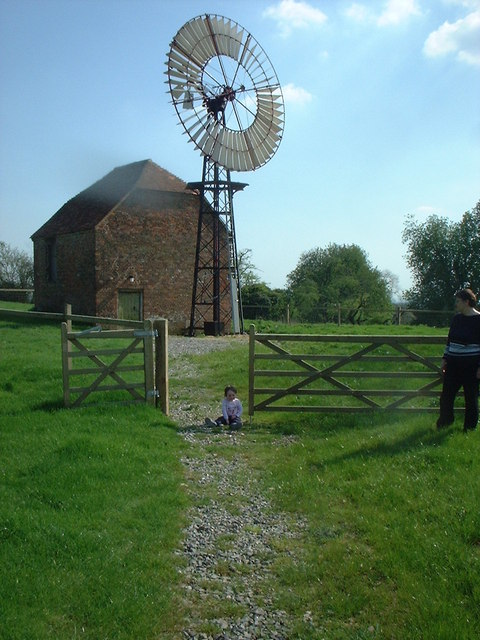
Crux Easton wind engine

Crux Easton is a village and former civil parish, now in the parish of Ashmansworth, in the Basingstoke and Deane district of Hampshire, England, about 7 miles (11 km) south of Newbury, Berkshire. In 1931, the parish had a population of 63.

== History ==
The Church of England parish church of St Michael and All Angels was built in 1775, restored in 1894 and is a Grade II* listed building.

In 1870 official records showed that Crux Easton parish covered 1,099 acres (445 ha), had a population of 76, and had 17 houses.

There is a wind engine at Crux Easton that was made by John Wallis Titt in about 1892.

During the Second World War, the British Union of Fascists leader Sir Oswald Mosley bought Crux Easton House, where he and his wife Diana were placed under house arrest in 1944.

Geoffrey de Havilland's father was vicar of Crux Easton.

On 1 April 1932 the parish was abolished and merged with Ashmansworth.

== Thomas Croc ==
A grant [1216-1272] of corn was made by Thomas Croc [Croch](dead by 1230) to the Canons of the Church of Saint John the Baptist, Sandleford of three quarters de meliori frumento [the better corn] annually in his town and manor of Estun. Witnesses: Sir Henry de Wodecote [ Woodcott ], John Lanceleuee, Robert Lord de Vrleston, William de Edmundestrop, Richard de Quercu, Bartholomew Croc, Vrlestun, son of Ranuld de Vndecote and Richard Croc.
