= List of windmills in Wales =

This is a list of windmills in Wales.

== Locations ==
=== Anglesey ===
There were 49 windmills in Anglesey, the most of any county in Wales.

See List of windmills in Anglesey.

=== Carmarthenshire ===
There was one windmill in Carmarthenshire.

Location	Name of mill and grid reference	Type	Maps	First mention or built	Last mention or demise	Photograph
Machynys	Machynys Brick & Tile Co Ltd			1900	1900	

=== Ceredigion ===
There were four windmills in Ceredigion.

=== Conwy ===
There was one windmill in Conwy County Borough.

Location	Name of mill and grid reference	Type	Maps	First mention or built	Last mention or demise	Photograph
Llandudno	Melin Hen Dŵr; SH 804 812	Tower		Early 18th century		

=== Denbighshire ===
There were three windmills in Denbighshire.

=== Flintshire ===
There were five windmills in Flintshire.

Location	Name of mill and grid reference	Type	Maps	First mention or built	Last mention or demise	Photograph
Trefynnon	Groes Onnen	Tower				
Whitford	Melin Garreg; SJ 1336 7826	Tower				

=== Glamorgan ===
There were twelve windmills in Glamorgan, not including the Titt engine.

Location	Name of mill and grid reference	Type	Maps	First mention or built	Last mention or demise	Photograph
Caswell Bay						
Llantrisant	Y Billy Wynt; ST 042 835	Tower				
Llantwit Major	SS 9614 6856	Tower				
Llantwit Major	Melin Frampton; SS 972 693	Tower		1820		
Monknash	Melin Monknash; SS 919 706	Tower				
Radyr		Titt iron wind engine		1894		
St Donats		Tower			Standing in 1815	
Sully	Hayes Farm Mill; ST 1410 6789	Tower				
Swansea	Kilvey Hill Mill	Tower			Demolished by 1957	
Wick	SS 9258 7199	Tower				
Wick	SS 924 721	Tower	1878	1878		

=== Gwynedd ===
There were four windmills in Gwynedd

Location	Name of mill and grid reference	Type	Maps	First mention or built	Last mention or demise	Photograph
Llanengan	SH 297 275	tower				
Mynytho	Melin Foel Fawr; SH 305 320	Tower				

=== Monmouthshire ===
There were two windmills in Monmouthshire.

Location	Name of mill and grid reference	Type	Maps	First mention or built	Last mention or demise	Photograph
Llancayo	Melin Llancayo; SO 365 030	Tower		1813		
Rogiet	Melin Rogiet; ST 455 883	Tower		16th century	Grade II listed in 1995	

=== Pembrokeshire ===
There were nine windmills in Pembrokeshire.

Location	Name of mill and grid reference	Type	Maps	First mention or built	Last mention or demise	Photograph
Angle	SM 8668 0190	tower		Early 19th century	Truncated	
Dale	Dale Windmill; SM 809 062	tower				
Tyddewi	Twr y Felin; SM 758 251	tower		1806		

=== Powys ===
There were two windmills in Powys.

Location	Name of mill and grid reference	Type	Maps	First mention or built	Last mention or demise	Photograph
Bettisfield	Melin Bettisfield; SJ 472 349	Tower			Converted to dwelling	

See also

- Centre for Alternative Technology

== Maps ==
- 1878 Ordnance Survey

== Notes ==
Mills in bold are still standing, known building dates are indicated in bold. Text in italics denotes indicates that the information is not confirmed, but is likely to be the case stated.
