= Blacknor Fort =

Fort on the Isle of Portland, England

Coordinates: 50.54356°N 2.45381°W

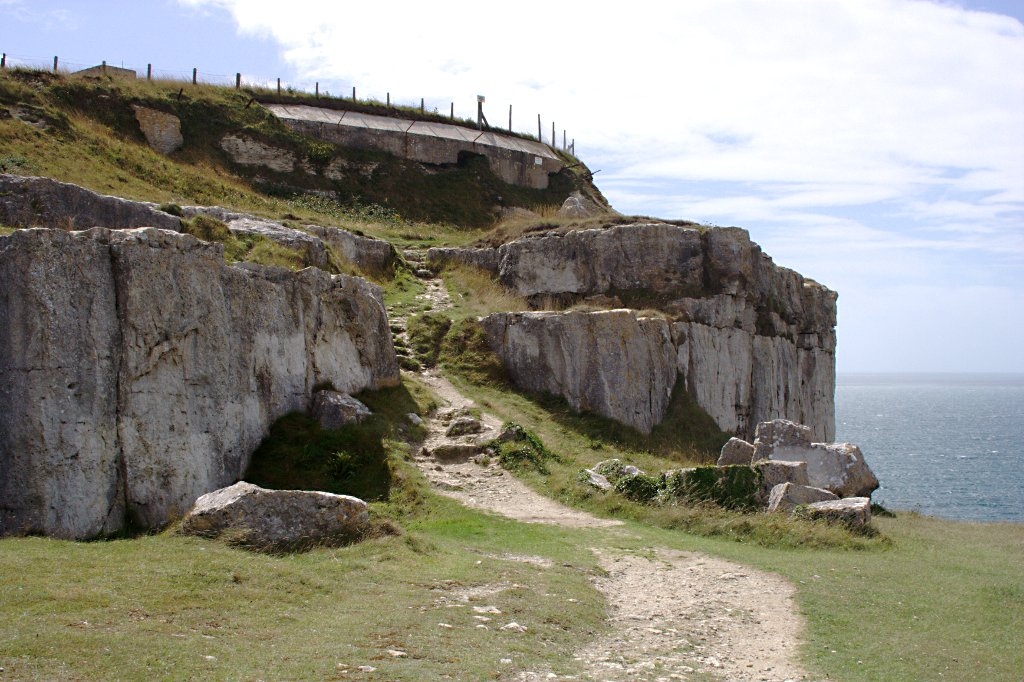
Blacknor Fort

Blacknor Fort is a 20th-century fort on the Isle of Portland, Dorset, England. It is located at Blacknor Point on the western side of Portland, close to Weston village.

== History ==
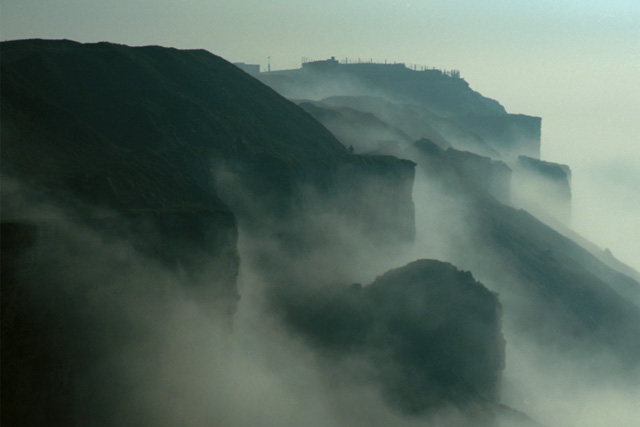
Blacknor Fort and the surrounding cliffs in fog

The fortress was built in 1900–02 as a coastal defence overlooking Lyme Bay to defend Portland Harbour and the other naval institutions on the island. The fort was operational during both World Wars with two 9.2-inch guns. During World War II, on the night of the 27 April 1944, the fort witnessed the Slapton Sands Massacre. As part of Exercise Tiger, United States soldiers were practising landings at Slapton Sands when they were attacked by German E-boats. The gunners at Blacknor Fort were ordered not to open fire for fear of hitting the Allied troops. More than 600 American soldiers and seamen drowned by the end of the night, many were pulled down by the weight of their own equipment.

The fort was decommissioned in 1956 and is now privately owned and split into three separate properties, one of which was built on top of one of the two gun emplacements. Two small gun emplacements and an observation post survive outside the fort's perimeter on the cliff edge.
