= List of windmills in Shropshire =

This is a list of windmills in the English county of Shropshire.

== Locations ==
Confirmed

Location	Name of mill and grid reference	Type	Maps	First mention or built	Last mention or demise	Photograph
Alberbury	Rew Wood Mill	Post			Gone by 1774	
Alberbury	Rowton Mill; Sunny Bank Mill; SJ 366 129	Tower		1774	Windmill World	
Albrighton	Albrighton Mill; SJ 802 040	Tower		1768	Windmill World	
Albrighton	SJ 818 042		1827	1827	1827	
Asterley	Westbury Road; SJ 373 075	Tower	1827; 1833	1809	Windmill World	
Barrow	Posenhall		1808	1808	1808, gone by 1845	
Bayston Hill	Lyth Hill Mill; SJ 470 068	Tower		c. 1835	Windmill World	
Bishop's Castle	Approximately; SO 327 897		1808	1805	1808	
Bourton	Henmoor Hill Mill			c. 1717	c. 1717	
Broome	Broome station	Titt iron wind engine		1895		
Broseley	Syners Hill Great Mill			1778	1838	
Broseley	Syners Hill Lesser Mill			1782	Stump still standing 2010	
Broseley	Ferney Bank Mill			1776	1838	
Cardeston	SJ 365 129	Tower		Late 18th century		
Chetwynd	Howle Mill; SJ 695 325	Tower		1845	Windmill World	
Ditton Priors	Hillside Mill; SO 593 877	Tower		1845	1883; Windmill World	
Ellesmere	SJ 406 342		1808	1803	1908	
Hadnall	Waterloo Mill; SJ 523 210	Tower		1787	Windmill World	
Harley	Harley Court Mill; SJ 597 018	Tower	1808	1808	Demolished 1960	
Harmer Hill	Shotton Farm Mill; SJ 496 216	Tower			Windmill World	
Ketley	Near ironworks SJ 673 107			1794	1856, gone by 1870	
Lilleshall				1804	1880, gone by 1901	
Longford	combined wind and water mill SJ 718 181	Tower				
Loppington	SJ 463 302		1808	1808	1908	
Lydbury North	Walcot Estate	Titt iron wind engine		1895		
Lydbury North	Walcot Estate	Titt iron wind engine		1896		
Madeley	Madeley Court Mill; SJ 695 053	Tower	1827; 1832	1702	Windmill World	
Munslow	Bache Mill			Early 19th century	1880s	
Much Wenlock				1321	1321	
Much Wenlock	Much Wenlock Mill; SJ 625 008	Tower	1752; 1833	1714	Windmill World	
Preston on the Weald Moors	west of village			1676	1676	
Rodington	SJ 590 144	Tower	1833	c. 1830	1904, truncated by 1936; Windmill World	
Shifnal	Upton Mill; SJ 756 067	Tower			Windmill World	
Shrewsbury				1267	1267	
Shrewsbury	Kingsland; SJ 484 117			1796	1796	
Telford	Hadley Park Mill; SJ 677 135	Tower	1808; 1827	c. 1787	Windmill World	
Wellington				1315	1315	
Wem				1281		
Wem	Cotonwood Mill; SJ 542 351	Tower		1813	Windmill World	
Westbury	Vennington Mill; SJ 337 096	Tower	1808	1808	Windmill World	
Weston-under-Redcastle	Hawkstone Mill; SJ 566 297	Tower		1808	Windmill World	
Willey				1755	1755	
Whixall	Stanley Green Mill; SJ 518 352		1827; 1833	1827	Demolished c. 1930	
Wrockwardine					destroyed 1349	
Wrockwardine			1752	1752	1752	
Wrockwardine	Cluddley Mill; SJ 631 104	Tower		1827	Windmill World	
Wroxeter	Charlton Hill Mill; SJ 588 075	Post	1752; 1808; 1827; 1833	1752	1833	

== Maps ==
- 1752 John Rocque
- 1808 Baugh
- 1827 C & G Greenwood
- 1832 Ordnance Survey
- 1833 Ordnance Survey

== Notes ==
Mills in bold are still standing, known building dates are indicated in bold. Text in italics denotes indicates that the information is not confirmed, but is likely to be the case stated.

== Sources ==
Unless otherwise indicated, the source for all entries is:-Seaby, Wilfred A, and Smith, Arthur C (1984). Windmills in Shropshire Hereford and Worcester. Stevenage: Stevenage Museum. ISBN 0-9504239-8-X. or the linked Windmill World page.
