= Union Mills, Burnham Overy =

Watermill and windmill in Burnham Overy, Norfolk, England

Burnham Overy Mills
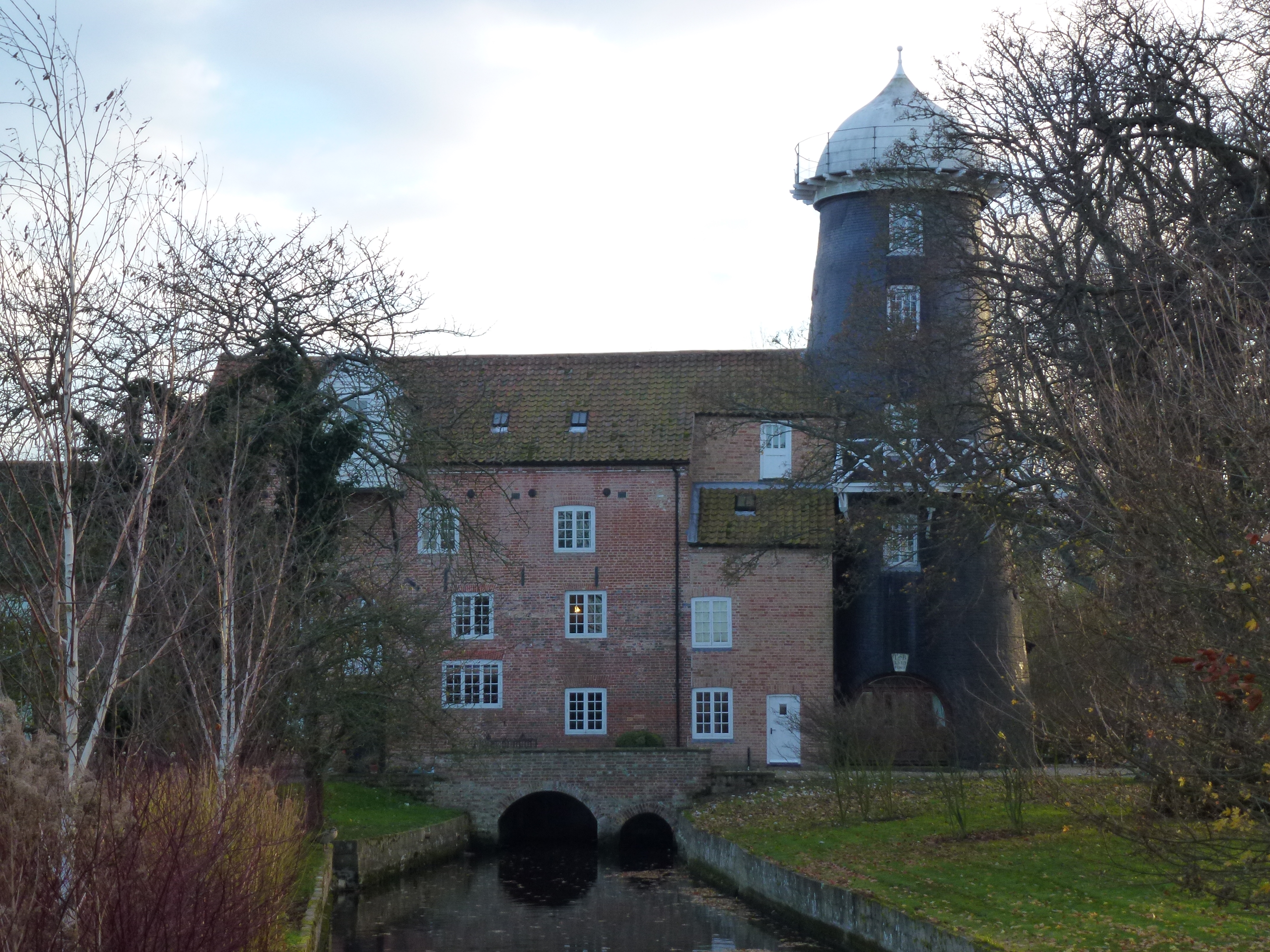
- Interactive map of Burnham Overy Mills

Origin
- Mill name: Union Mills
- Mill location: TF 8423 4260
- Coordinates: 52°57′35″N 0°44′05″E
- Operator: Private
- Year built: 1737

Information
- Purpose: Corn mill
- Type: Tower mill
- Storeys: Six storeys
- No. of sails: Four sails
- Type of sails: Double Patent sails
- Windshaft: cast iron
- Winding: Fantail
- Auxiliary power: Waterwheel, also a steam engine which was later replaced by a gas engine and then an oil engine
- No. of pairs of millstones: Two pairs, plus three pairs in the watermill
- Size of millstones: Two pairs 3 feet (910 mm) diameter, three pairs 4 feet (1.22 m) diameter

Union Mills or Roy's Mills are a Grade II listed combined tower mill and watermill at Burnham Overy, Norfolk, England which has been converted to residential accommodation.

== History ==
The watermill was built in 1737, this date being recorded on the watermill. As originally built, it was a two-storey mill. Thomas Beeston was the miller in 1802. The windmill was built in 1814 and bears a tablet inscribed T. B. 1814 PEACE, referring to the banishment of Napoleon to Elba in that year. The watermill was probably raised by a storey at this date. The mills were offered for sale by auction at the Norfolk Hotel, Norwich on 3 August 1825. The windmill was described as having five floors and the Patent sails had shutters made of copper. The mills were not sold. James Read took them, and worked them until his death in 1864. William Love Porritt, the son-in-law of James Read then took the mills. The mills were offered for sale by auction at the Hoste Arms Inn, Burnham Market on 13 July 1870. They were then being let to Porritt at an annual rental of £225. In 1893, the windmill was dismantled and the watermill fitted out with roller milling machinery.

In 1896, the mills had a steam engine as auxiliary power. This had been replaced by a gas engine by 1925. In May 1935, the mill tower was burnt out in a fire. The tower was refitted, and the former conical roof replaced with two cowled ventilators. An oil engine was the auxiliary power source in 1937. On 1 February 1953, the mills were flooded to a depth of 7 feet (2.13 m). The mills were still in use at this time but had ceased working by 1969. In 1999 the mills were purchased for conversion. A new ogee cap was constructed and fitted to the windmill tower.

== Description ==
The windmill is a six-storey tower mill with an ogee cap which has a gallery. There is a stage at third-floor level. The mill had four double Patent sails carried on a cast-iron windshaft. The windmill drove two pairs of French Burr millstones, and was also capable of driving the three pairs of French Burr millstones in the watermill.

The watermill is a three-storey brick building with a roof of pantiles. It is powered by an undershot Poncelet waterwheel made by Whitmore & Binyon, the Wickham Market, Suffolk, millwrights. The watermill drove three pairs of French Burr millstones and was also capable of driving the two pairs of French Burr millstones in the windmill.

== Millers ==
- Thomas Beeston 1802-25
- James Read 1830-64
- William Love Porritt 1865-1900
- Philip Roy 1904-22
- Philip Roy & Sons Ltd 1925-37
- Sidney Roy 1953

References for above:-
