= Chitterne =

Village and civil parish in Wiltshire, England

Coordinates: 51.195°N 2.013°W

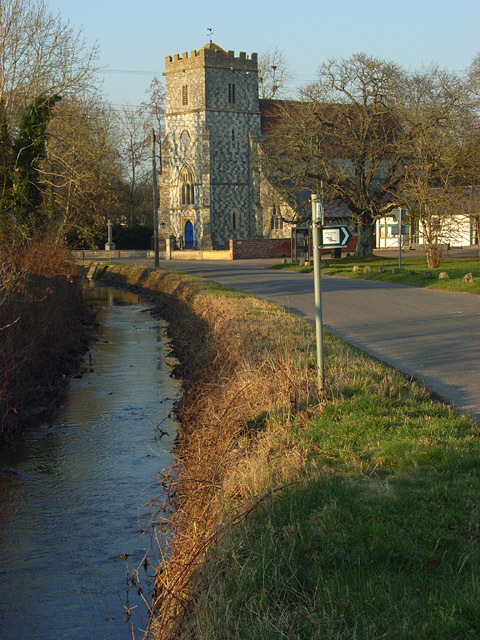
- Chitterne Brook and parish church

- Location within Wiltshire
- Population: 293 (in 2021)
- OS grid reference: ST992440
- Civil parish: Chitterne
- Unitary authority: Wiltshire
- Ceremonial county: Wiltshire
- Region: South West
- Country: England
- Sovereign state: United Kingdom
- Post town: Warminster
- Postcode district: BA12
- Dialling code: 01985
- Police: Wiltshire
- Fire: Dorset and Wiltshire
- Ambulance: South Western
- UK Parliament: South West Wiltshire
- Website: Parish Council

Chitterne is a village and civil parish in the county of Wiltshire, in the south west of England. The village lies in the middle of Salisbury Plain, about 7 miles (11 km) east of the town of Warminster.

The Chitterne Brook, a small tributary of the River Wylye, flows southwest through the village.

== Etymology ==
The name of Chitterne is first attested in the Domesday Book, as Cetre and Celtre; similar forms continue to be a found through the thirteenth century. Forms more closely resembling the modern name are first attested in 1268, in the form Chytterne. The English Place-Name Society survey of Wiltshire concluded that the name derives from the Old English words cyte ("cottage") and ærn ("building"). But Eilert Ekwall and subsequent commentators concluded that the first element of the name was the Common Brittonic word that survives in modern Welsh as coed ("woodland"). The second element was originally the word found in Welsh as tref ("farm"), and was adapted later in the history of the name by folk etymology to look like the Old English word ærn.

== History ==
A large settlement of 60 households, held by Edward of Salisbury, was recorded in the Domesday Book of 1086. Chitterne was one of many Wiltshire estates owned in the 12th century by Ela, 3rd Countess of Salisbury.

There were two ancient parishes, Chitterne St Mary to the west and Chitterne All Saints to the east. Their villages were adjacent and each had a small parish church. In the 19th century they became two civil parishes, then in 1907 they were combined to form Chitterne civil parish.

A village school was built near the village green in 1840 and was attended by children of all ages until 1937, when it became a junior school. The school closed in 1967, by which time the number of pupils had fallen below 20.

== Features ==
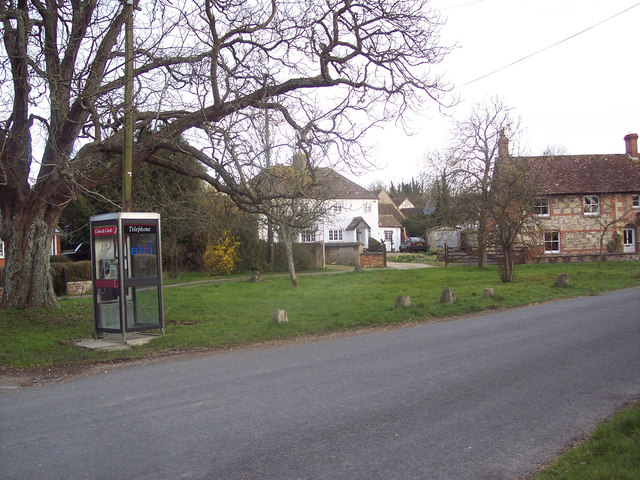
The village green

Chitterne has a village hall, which stands on the site of the former school. Opposite the hall is a large sports field, on which cricket and football are played, according to the season. The village also has a public house called the King's Head. There are several notable houses, including Chitterne House, the Manor, the Grange, and Manor Farm, all Grade II listed for their architectural merit.

Large parts of Chitterne parish are Ministry of Defence land within the Salisbury Plain Training Area; the Imber firing range is to the north and the Copehill Down training area to the east. The latter has an uninhabited "German Village" used by the British Army for training in street warfare (FIBUA - Fighting in Built-up Areas). This was built in the mid-1980s, before the Berlin Wall was demolished, and is based on a typical village of Saxony in Germany. A few miles to the north, across Salisbury Plain in the "Danger Area", and now part of Heytesbury parish, lies the remains of the ancient village of Imber.

== Religious sites ==
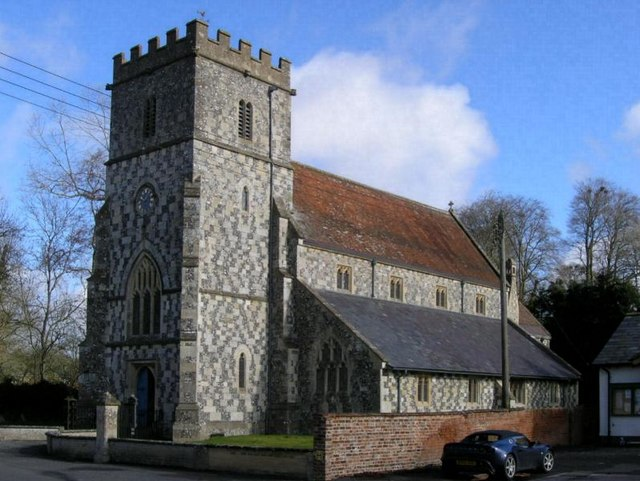
Victorian church

The first records of churches in the parishes are from 1270 for All Saints and 1319 for St Mary's; both were largely rebuilt in the 15th century. From 1848 the two churches were served by one vicar, and by that time the churches were in need of repair and too small to serve the growing population, so a new church was built in the centre of the village and opened in 1863.

The new church was built in flint and stone in the Perpendicular style, to designs of T.H. Wyatt. The 12th-century font was brought from St Mary's, as were the pulpit and two bells. The church was designated as Grade II* listed in 1968 and is now part of the Salisbury Plain benefice.

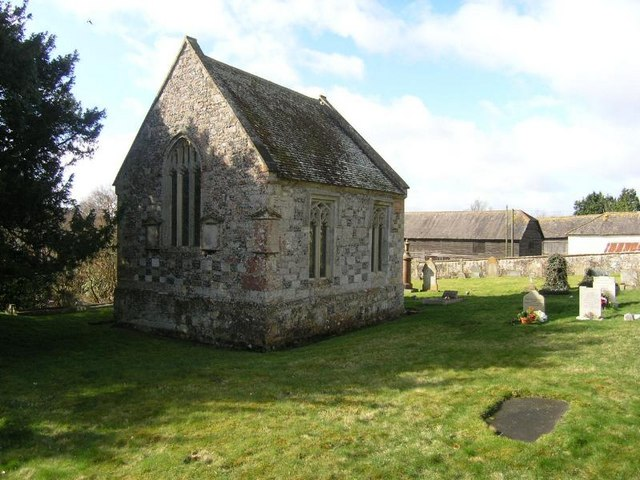
Surviving part of St Mary's Church

At first the chancels of both earlier churches were retained, to serve as chapels for their graveyards. All Saints was demolished in 1877 but St Mary's chancel still stands and is Grade II* listed.

A Wesleyan Methodist chapel was built sometime before 1846, and was later taken over by Baptists. After a fire in 1903, a rebuilt chapel opened on the same site in 1904. The chapel closed c.1969 and is now a private house.

== Local government ==
Most local government services are provided by Wiltshire Council, which has its offices in Trowbridge, 15 miles (24 km) to the north. Chitterne also has its own elected parish council of seven members, five representing the ancient parish of Chitterne All Saints and two representing the former Chitterne St Mary.

The village is represented in Parliament by the MP for South West Wiltshire, Andrew Murrison.

== In popular culture ==
In Dennis Wheatley's 1934 novel The Devil Rides Out, characters drive through the parishes of Chitterne St. Mary and Chitterne All Saints. A Satanic 'Grand Sabbat' then takes place somewhere between Chitterne All Saints, Imber, and Tilshead.

== Notable people ==
- Sir Arthur Gooch, 14th Baronet
- Sir Richard Johns, Royal Air Force officer
- Ferdinand Mount, author and journalist, grew up in Chitterne
- General Sir Nick Parker, soldier
- General John Strawson, soldier
- Danny Sullivan, US technologist, lived in Chitterne
- John Wallis Titt, engineer, was born in Chitterne.
