= List of windmills in West Yorkshire =

This is a list of windmills in the English county of West Yorkshire.

== Locations ==
Location	Name of mill and grid reference	Type	Maps	First mention or built	Last mention or demise	Photograph
Aberford	Barkeston Mill			1216	1216	
Aberford	Hicklam Mill; SE 434 359	Tower		18th century	Windmill World	
Aberford	Lotherton Mill			1720	1720	
Barwick in Elmet	Barwick Mill			1850s	Demolished 1950s	
Birstall	Brownhill Mill; SE 233 262	Tower			Windmill World	
Bramham	Bramham Mill; SE 432 433	Tower		18th century	Windmill World	
Darrington	Darrington Mill; SE 474 199	Tower		Late 18th or early 19th century	Windmill World	
Howden	Howden Brickworks Pump; SE 250 280	Tower			Windmill World	
Kippax	Kippax Mill; SE 426 299	Tower		18th century	Windmill World	
Knottingley	Knottingley Mill; SE 500 230	Tower			Windmill World	
Leeds	Colton Mill; SE 376 330	Tower		Mid-18th century	Windmill World	
Leeds	Potternewton Mill; SE 296 365	Tower		Late 18th century	Windmill World	
Leeds	Whin Moor Mill; Seacroft Mill; SWillington Mill; SE 359 364	Tower			Windmill World	
Leeds	Flint Mill			1758	1774	
Morley	Morley Mill					
Pontefract	Dandy Mill; Boreas Union Mill; SE 468 230	Tower		1819	Windmill World	
South Kirkby	Kirkby Mill; SE 4438 1035	Tower	1854			
Upton	Upton Mill; SE 474 139	Tower			Windmill World	
Wakefield	Flint Mill	Smock		1755		
Wakefield	Oil Mill	Smock		1755		
West Ardsley	Boyle Hall	Titt iron wind engine		1899	Demolished by 1971	

== Maps ==
- 1772 T Jeffereys
- 1775 Jackson
- 1829 A Bryant
- 1854 Ordnance Survey
- 1855 Ordnance Survey

== Notes ==
Mills in bold are still standing, known building dates are indicated in bold. Text in italics denotes indicates that the information is not confirmed, but is likely to be the case stated.

== Sources ==
Unless otherwise indicated, the source for all entries is:-Gregory, Roy (1985). East Yorkshire Windmills. Cheddar: Charles Skilton Ltd. ISBN 0-284-98721-2. or the linked Windmill World page.
