= List of windmills in South Yorkshire =

This is a list of windmills in the English county of South Yorkshire.

== Locations ==
Location	Name of mill and grid reference	Type	Maps	First mention or built	Last mention or demise	Photograph
Cantley	Sandpit Hill Mill; SE 633 018	Tower			Windmill World	
Fishlake	Millfield Mill; SE 648 140	Tower			Windmill World	
Fishlake	West Nab Mill; SE 652 131	Tower			Windmill World	
Dunscroft	Ling's Mill; SE 660 883	Tower			Windmill World	
Hatfield Woodhouse	Hatfield Mill; SE 671 087	Tower			Windmill World	
Moss	Wrancarr Mill; SE 593 128	Tower			Windmill World	
Norton	Norton Mill; SE 538 148	Tower			Windmill World	
Sykehouse	Sykehouse Mill; SE 625 174	Tower			Windmill World	
Thorne	Oates Mill; SE 686 137	Tower		Early 19th century	Windmill World	
Thorne		Post			Standing in 1911	
Wentworth	Wentworth Mill; SK 392 892	Tower			Windmill World	
Wentworth	Barrow Mill; SK 379 987	Tower			Windmill World	

== Sources ==
Unless otherwise indicated, the source for all entries is:- Gregory, Roy (1985). East Yorkshire Windmills. Cheddar: Charles Skilton Ltd. ISBN 0-284-98721-2. or the linked Windmill World page.
