= Portland Windmills =

Two stone towers in Portland, Dorset, UK

Coordinates: 50.5410°N 2.4370°W

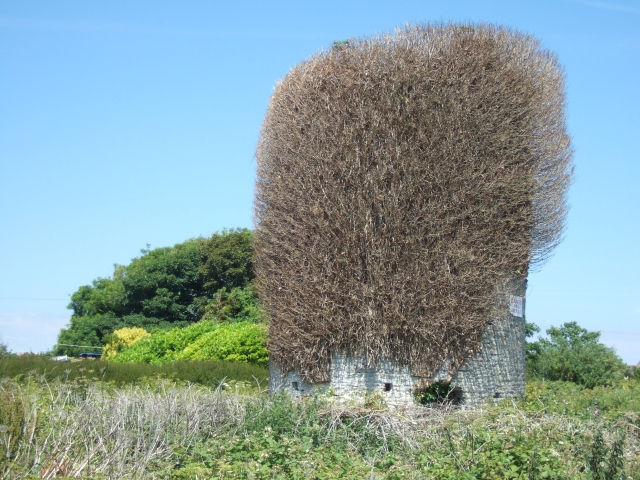
Angel Mill (northern windmill)

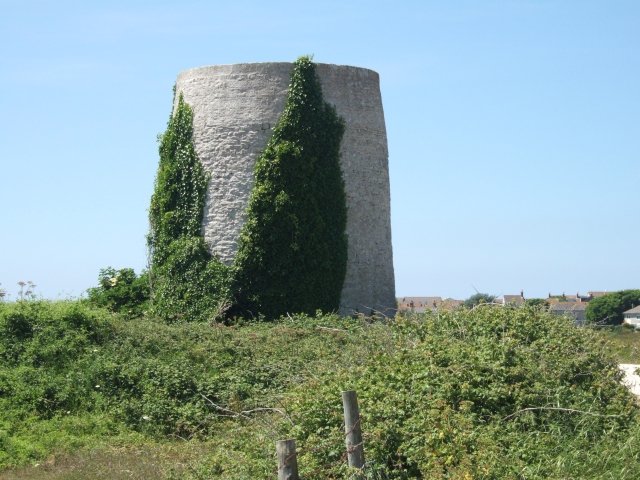
South Mill (southern windmill)

The Portland Windmills are two disused stone towers which were used as windmills from at least the early 17th century. They are located on the Isle of Portland south of Easton village and the east of Weston village. The towers, which are relatively short mills with conical caps, stand approximately 135 metres apart. They have been separate Grade II Listed monuments since September 1978, and are the only historic windmill remains to survive in Dorset.

== History ==
Although their origin is unknown, Portland's windmills were first recorded in the Land Revenue Accounts of 1608. They were also featured on a 1626 map by William Simplon and the Hutchins map of 1710, where they were depicted as prominent landmarks. It is believed that the two windmills are two of the earliest of their type in the United Kingdom and were probably built by local craftsmen. The mills, which were traditionally operated by the Pearce family, ceased use in the 1890s as mass-produced flour and bread became available through Portland's modern rail and road links.

During World War II, the south tower was used as a look-out post. The same tower was renovated by ARC Ltd in 1991. In 2000, some care was given to the windmills in attempt to preserve them, while in recent years, attempts have been made to form a trust to preserve both windmills.
