= John Wallis Titt =

English mechanical engineer (1841–1910)

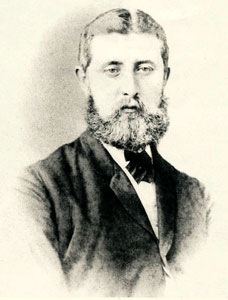
- John Wallis Titt
- Born: 14 April 1841; Chitterne, Wiltshire
- Died: 5 May 1910 (aged 69)
- Children: Two sons
- Parent(s): John Titt; Eliza Titt (Née Wallis)
- Engineering career
- Discipline: Agricultural engineering, wind engines
- Practice name: Woodcock Ironworks, Warminster

John Wallis Titt (14 April 1841 – 5 May 1910) was a nineteenth-century English agricultural engineer, millwright, iron founder, and builder of large wind engines.

== Early life ==
Titt was born in 1841 at Chitterne, Wiltshire, the son of John Titt and his wife Eliza Wallis. He was baptized into the Church of England at Chitterne St Mary on 24 October 1841. In the 1851 census, his father was a farmer of 220 acres employing ten labourers. Elm Farm, Chitterne, had a post mill, which as a young man Titt worked for his father.

== Career ==
In 1865, Titt left home to join Messrs Wallis, Haslam and Steevens, agricultural engineers and steam engine manufacturers of Basingstoke, Hampshire. He worked for them for about two years as a commercial traveller. In 1867, he joined the millwrighting firm of Brown & May, based in Devizes, Wiltshire. He remained with them for five years. From 1870, Titt was an agent for Brown and May. From 1872, he was an agricultural engineer with that firm and also an agent for Fowler's of Leeds, Yorkshire. In March 1874, he went into business on his own account, announcing that he had succeeded to the Warminster branch of Brown & May's business and henceforward would repair Portable Steam Engines and machines and act as agent for all kinds of engineering.

In 1876, Titt established the Woodcock Ironworks at Warminster and at first was mostly manufacturing elevators. He continued in business as an agricultural engineer and iron founder, and in 1884 made his first wind engine, for the Boyton estate. Titt continued to run the firm until he retired through ill health in 1903, the year in which he exhibited three wind engines at the Royal Agricultural Society's show, at Park Royal, Acton, London.

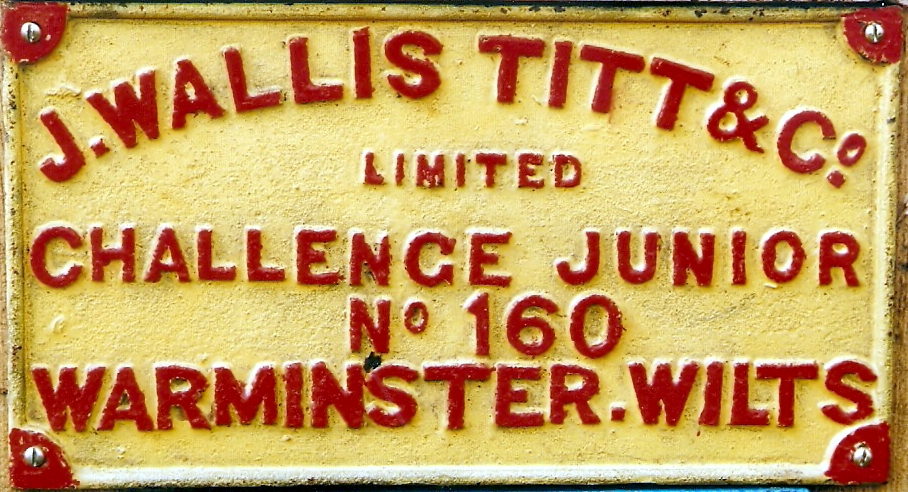
Identification plate for one of Titt's machines

In 1903, Titt sold his business, the Woodcock Ironworks and its assets, to two of his sons, Alec and Herbert Titt, for £5,000 (equivalent to £525,636 in 2025) "to be paid in manner mentioned in an Indenture of Assignment and Covenant dated the 12th September 1903". The firm was continued by those sons.

Titt died in May 1910. In reporting his death, the Salisbury Times referred to him as "the founder of the firm which turns out the wind-pumps which ornament, or otherwise, the countryside."

== Personal life ==
On 23 November 1868, at Warminster, Titt married Emily Eliza Sainsbury, the daughter of Thomas Sainsbury, of Warminster, an innkeeper. At the April 1871 census, they were living at Portway, Chitterne, with their eight-month old son Alec and one young housemaid. Another son, John Wallis Sainsbury Titt, baptized in 1879, died young. At the time of the 1901 census, Titt and his wife were living at Woodcock House, Warminster, with sons called Herbert W., aged 27, engineer, and Wallis G., aged 19, bank clerk. Two unmarried daughters were also living with them, Edith and Ethel. Herbert Wallis Titt, born in 1873, migrated to Australia in the 1930s but later returned to Warminster. Emily Eliza Titt died in Warminster on 10 March 1939, aged 93.

== Titt wind engines ==
Titt made three main types of wind engine: the Woodcock, the Simplex direct, and the Simplex geared. After the firm was taken over by his sons, another standard type of windpump, the Imperial, was produced.

Woodcock engines

The Woodcock engine was a conventional iron windpump. It came in two sizes, with wind wheels of 10 feet (3.05 m) and 12 feet (3.66 m) and could be supplied with a wood or steel tower. The Woodcock wind engine could pump water to a total height of 150 feet (45.72 m).

Simplex direct engines

The Simplex engines came either as direct drive or as geared drive. The direct drive engines had a wind wheel diameter of 14 feet (4.27 m), 16 feet (4.88 m), 18 feet (5.49 m), 20 feet (6.10 m) or 25 feet (7.62 m). A 25 feet (7.62 m) high tower was supplied as standard, but could be made to any greater height a customer desired at extra cost. The blades of the wind wheel were similar in design and operation to the shutters on a Spring or Patent sail. Some of the larger direct engines were turned into the wind by a fantail. A single or double fantail could be ordered, according to the customer's wishes.

Simplex geared engines

The geared engines came in the same sizes as the direct engines and were also available in 30 feet (9.14 m), 35 feet (10.67 m), and 40 feet (12.19 m) diameters. A 25 feet (7.62 m) tower was standard for the smallest three sizes, and the larger sizes came with a 35 feet (10.67 m) as standard. Again, a taller tower could be supplied at extra cost. The geared Simplex engines were turned into the wind by a fantail.

Imperial engines

By January 1906, the firm was also advertising "Imperial" pumping wind engines, in sizes between 20 feet (6.10 m) and 8 feet (2.44 m), "constructed throughout of steel, and suitable for pumping water from wells and boreholes".

=== Wind engine locations ===
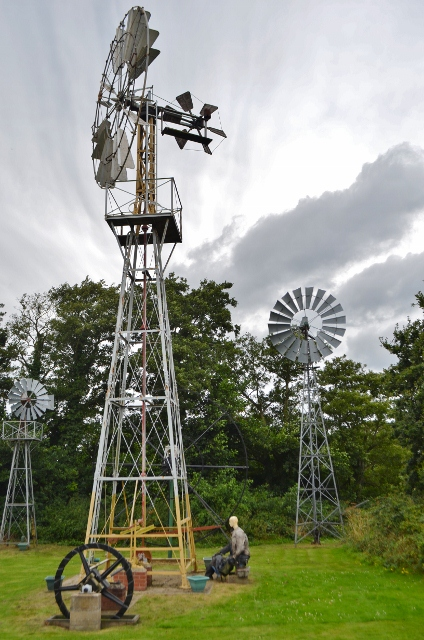
One of the two Titt wind engines now at Morse's Wind Engine Park, Repps, Norfolk

Two remaining wind engines made by John Wallis Titt are on show at the Wind Energy Museum in Repps with Bastwick, Norfolk.

Titt wind engines are known to have been built at the following locations:^{unless otherwise stated}

Location	Type	Notes
Almondsbury, Gloucestershire		Erected about 1894 for the Cattybrook Brick Company Ltd.
Amesbury, Wiltshire		A wind engine was erected at Amesbury Junction for the London and South Western Railway.
Barrowby, Lincolnshire		Erected by 1899 for the Duke of Devonshire.
Basingstoke, Hampshire		Erected in 1898 at Pitt Hall Farm, Upper Wooton.
Bentworth, Hampshire	Simplex	A wind engine was erected in 1901 at Bentworth and Lasham station on the Basingstoke and Alton Light Railway. It can be seen in a photo of the station dated 1928, standing just behind the station building.
Bitterne, Hampshire		Erected at Thornhill Park in 1894.
Boyton, Wiltshire		First wind engine supplied by Titt in 1884.
Breaston, Derbyshire		Erected at Perks Park in 1935 for use as a windpump; restored in 2008.
Bridgwater, Somerset		Erected in 1893 at Stowey Farm.
Broome, Shropshire		Erected in 1895 at Broome Station for the London and North Western Railway.
Burderop, Wiltshire		Erected by 1899 on the Burderop Estate for Colonel Thomas Calley.
Burnham-on-Sea, Somerset		Erected for Holt Brothers, Burnham Brewery by 1894.
Bury St Edmunds, Suffolk	Simplex wind engine driving chain pumps.	Erected in 1898 for Bury St Edmunds Town Council at a sewerage works in the town.
Bury St Edmunds, Suffolk	40 feet (12.19 m) geared Simplex wind engine on a 35 feet (10.67 m) steel tower, itself erected on a 22 feet 6 inches (6.86 m) brick tower.	The largest Titt engine to date when built. The overall height of the engine was 81 feet (24.69 m). The 50 sails were 12 feet (3.66 m) long, tapering from 2 feet 6 inches (760 mm) at the tip to 1 foot (300 mm) at the heel. Equipped with twin fantails. Supplied the town with water. Proposal in 1900 to adapt it to generate electricity too.
Calne, Wiltshire		Erected by 1900 at Bowood House for the Marquess of Lansdowne.
Castletown, Isle of Man		Erected in May 1892, replaced a steam engine.
Chesfield, Hertfordshire		Erected at Chesfield Park by 1896. Supplied water from a well 300 feet (91.44 m) deep to a 2,000 imperial gallons (9,100 L) tank.
Chitterne, Wiltshire	Woodcock	Erected at Manor Farm in 1905, standing 1936.
Cliddesden, Hampshire	Simplex	A wind engine was erected in 1901 at Cliddesden railway station on the Basingstoke and Alton Light Railway. It was demolished in the late 1940s. The wind engine can be seen briefly in the film Oh, Mr Porter!
Codford St. Mary, Wiltshire		Erected by 1893.
Cookham, Berkshire	20 feet (6.10 m) geared Simplex on 40 feet (12.19 m) hexagonal tower.	Powered a chaff cutter, corn grinder, oat crusher and peat moss breaker. Erected at Sutton Farm for F D Lambert by 1894.
Croscombe, Somerset	18 feet (5.49 m) Simplex	Erected in 1899 for Shepton Mallett Rural District Council. Used a 4-inch (100 mm) double suction pump to pump water to a height of 84 feet (25.60 m).
Crux Easton, Hampshire; SU 4258 5642	20 feet (6.10 m) Simplex geared wind engine on a 32 feet (9.75 m) hexagonal steel tower	Main article: Crux Easton wind engine Erected in 1891, last worked in the 1920s, sails removed in the 1960s and restoration completed in 2002.
Dover, Kent		Erected at the Infectious Diseases Hospital by 1893 for Dover Corporation.
Dunwich, Suffolk		Erected by 1895 for the Grey Friars.
Dursley, Gloucestershire		Erected by 1901 at Cam Mills.
Dursley, Gloucestershire	16 feet (4.88 m) Simplex on a 60 feet (18.29 m) steel tower.	Erected in 1898. Supplied over thirty properties in Dursley with water. Reservoir was 300 yards (270 m) from the wind engine.
Elsenham, Essex	Simplex	Drove an oat crusher in addition to pumping water. Erected for Walter Gilbey.
Faringdon, Berkshire		Erected by 1900 at Royal Prize Farm, Wadley House.
Foxhill, Wanborough, Wiltshire		Erected by 1896.
Gillingham, Dorset	Simplex wind engine on a brick water tower.	Erected at The Kendalls by 1895.
Gilmorton, Leicestershire		Erected in a field adjacent to the M1; probably used for a nearby farming estate.
Glastonbury, Somerset		Supplied water to The Elms. Erected by 1892.
Great Brington, Northamptonshire	30 feet (9.14 m) diameter Simplex geared wind engine.	Supplied Great Brington and Little Brington with water from a well 202 feet (61.57 m) deep. Capacity 40,000 imperial gallons (180,000 L) per day. Erected for Earl Spencer by 1894.
Tytherington, Wiltshire		Erected by 1893 on the Tytherington Estate. Supplied water to a reservoir 3/4 mile (1,207 m) away. Water raised a total of 260 feet (79.25 m) in height. The original wind-pump blew down in a storm around 1935-1940. The site is still used to pump water for the village, not using a wind-pump.
Heytesbury, Wiltshire		Erected in 1895 at Bolesbro' Knoll for Lord Heytesbury.
Highworth, Wiltshire		Erected by 1898 at Hannington Hall. Supplied water to the house, farm and stables.
Hinton Charterhouse, Somerset		Wind engine erected in 1895 for Bath Union Rural District Council. Auxiliary power supplied by a horse. The engine was 1/3 mile (536 m) from the reservoir and 130 feet (39.62 m) lower than it was.
Hundon, Suffolk	Simplex on hexagonal steel tower	Built at North Street, Hundon. Extant in 1940.
Knighton, Leicestershire		Erected at Narborough Wood Farm by 1896.
Leiston, Suffolk		Erected by 1892.
Leiston, Suffolk	16 feet (4.88 m) Simplex	Erected in 1924 on the site of a smock mill. Standing in 1979.
Leiston, Suffolk		Erected by 1891 for C P Ogilvie. Supplied Sizewell house with water.
Limavady, Co Londonderry	35 feet (10.67 m) geared Simplex on a 50 feet (15.24 m) hexagonal steel tower. Drove an 18 feet (5.49 m) diameter scoop wheel.	Erected at Limavady Junction.
Littleham, Devon		Supplied Heale House via a 16,000 imperial gallons (73,000 L) water tank.
Lockinge, Berkshire	35 feet (10.67 m) geared Simplex on a 40 feet (12.19 m) hexagonal steel tower	Erected on Lockinge Downs in 1895 to supply Lockinge House with water.
Lower Assendon, Oxfordshire	16 feet (4.88 m) Imperial	Extant in 1977.
Lydbury North, Shropshire		Erected in 1895 at the Walcot Estate for Lord Powis.
Lydbury North, Shropshire		Erected in 1896 at the Walcot Estate for Lord Powis, replacing a steam engine. Supplied water from a well 15 feet (4.57 m) deep to a height of 84 feet (25.60 m). The tank was 480 yards (440 m) from the wind engine.
Marchwood, Hampshire	16 feet (4.88 m) engine on a 70 feet (21.34 m) steel tower.	Erected in 1893 at a cost of £155.
Margherita di Savoia, Italy	Geared Simplex	A wind engine was erected for the Italian Government.
Micheldever, Hampshire		Erected by 1898 on the Stratton Estate for the Earl of Northbrook.
Narborough, Leicestershire		
Odstock, Wiltshire		Erected by 1886 for the Earl of Radnor.
Par, Cornwall	Two Simplex engines	Erected at Trenython, Par Station for the Bishop of Truro by 1894.
Radyr, Glamorganshire		Erected by 1894.
Repps, Norfolk; TG 417 174		A Titt wind engine is preserved at Morse's Wind Engine Park, Repps. Photographs show it to be a small Simplex on a 30 feet (9.14 m) tower.
Repps, Norfolk; TG 417 174		A second Titt wind engine is preserved at Morse's Wind Engine Park, Repps.
Salisbury, Wiltshire		Erected by 1890.
Ross-on-Wye, Herefordshire	Geared Simplex	A geared Simplex wind engine driving horizontal treble barrel plunger pumps was erected at a waterworks at Ross-on-Wye.
Savernake Forest, Wiltshire		Erected at Chisbury Farm by 1888 for the Marquess of Ailesbury.
Shute, Devon		Erected in 1900 for Sir Edmund de la Pole of Shute House. Supplied to Shute House with water.
Southport, Lancashire	Simplex mounted on a water tower	Erected by 1894 for Southport Corporation.
Stockbridge, Hampshire		Erected by 1900 at Marshcourt for Herbert Johnson.
Southwold, Suffolk	Simplex	Erected c1886 for Southwold Corporation. Standing in 1893.
Stourton, Wiltshire		Erected at Search Farm by 1888, replaced a Halliday's wind engine which had blown down.
Sutton Veny, Wiltshire		Erected at The Beeches by 1895. Auxiliary drive powered by horse.
Swindon, Wiltshire		A wind engine was erected in 1907 at Swindon Works to pump water for use by locomotives.
Tisbury, Wiltshire		Erected in 1888 for V F Bennett-Stanfore, Pyt House. Supplied Pyt House and Home Farm with water.
West Ardsley, Yorkshire	30 feet (9.14 m) Simplex on a 35 feet (10.67 m) hexagonal steel tower, itself built on a stone base.	Erected in February 1899 at Boyle Hall for Luther Colbeck. Generated electricity. A dynamo powered 110 lights, mostly rated at 16 candlepower, with some rated at 8 candlepower.
Westbury, Wiltshire	16 feet (4.88 m) engine on a steel tower	Erected by 1892, supplied water to Courtleigh.
West Dean, West Sussex	20 feet (6.10 m) wind engine	Erected in 1898. Supplied water from a well 186 feet (56.69 m) deep.
West Dean, West Sussex	20 feet (6.10 m) wind engine	Erected in 1898. Supplied water from a well 120 feet (36.58 m) deep.
West Stow, Suffolk		Erected at the sewage works c1898.
Westwick, Norfolk	18 feet (5.49 m) wind engine on a 60 feet (18.29 m) steel tower	Erected in November 1893 at Westwick Hall. Supplied a 2,000 imperial gallons (9,100 L) tank at a total height to 57 feet (17.37 m).
Winterbourne Stoke, Wiltshire		Erected in 1899 at Hill Farm.
Wold Newton, Lincolnshire	Two wind pumps	In 1910 a borehole was sunk in the middle of the village, which is situated in a valley. One pump was erected to move water up the hill to a reservoir which then supplied the village by gravity. This pump was later converted to electricity before being removed when mains water arrived in the 1970s. A second pump moved water further up the hill to a second reservoir which then fed water troughs for livestock.

The name "Simplex" was independently used by an Australian windmill manufacturer (the Intercolonial Boring Company) for its windmills, with the name used to describe greatness in simplicity. The windmill and its design had no association with Titt's machines. A restored IBC Direct Acting Simplex windmill is part of the National Museum of Australia collection. It is 13 metres high with a six-metre sail diameter. The windmill drew water from the Great Artesian Basin at Kenya Station in central Queensland from the 1920s until 1988, when it was decommissioned. It was subsequently donated to the museum in 2008 and installed in 2011.

== Later history of the J. W. Titt business ==
At the end of 1908, the partnership between Alec and Herbert Titt, carrying on business under the name of John Wallis Titt, was dissolved, and the firm came into the hands of Alec Titt. In October 1915, he was commissioned into the Royal Army Service Corps. In December 1919, he relinquished his commission, but kept the rank of Captain.

Apart from the agricultural side of the engineering business, it also handled bicycles and motor cars. At its height, some 150 people were employed by the firm, but it declined after the First World War.

In August 1928, Captain Alec J. B. Titt, of Belmont, Warminster, died of appendicitis and peritonitis while he was head of the engineering firm. In the aftermath of his death, a limited company, John Wallis Titt & Co. Limited, was formed on 23 January 1929.

In 1929, after the death of Alec Titt, only 25 people were employed. In the 1940s, under the management of G. T. Frost, the firm expanded again, and in 1952 it was employing 60 people. A branch was established at Frome, Somerset. The Warminster headquarters closed in 1986, but the firm continued in business in Frome until 2009.

In 1975, John Wallis Titt of Warminster bought out all the agricultural interests of Wallis & Steevens of Basingstoke, the first firm J. W. Titt had worked for.

On 26 August 2009, a general meeting of the limited company held in Bath resolved to wind the company up voluntarily and to appoint a liquidator. The company was wound up on 9 September 2011, when the secured and preferential creditors were paid in full; ninety unsecured creditors, who were owed £308,999, received 32.6 pence in the pound. There were 40,000 shares in the company, and the shareholders received nothing.
