= William Holmes à Court =

William Holmes à Court may refer to:

- William à Court-Holmes, 2nd Baron Heytesbury later Holmes-à Court (1809–1891), British peer and politician
- William Holmes à Court, 3rd Baron Heytesbury (1862–1903), British peer and landowner
- William Holmes à Court, 5th Baron Heytesbury (1906–1971), British landowner and peer
