= Knook (disambiguation) =

Knook is a village in Wiltshire, England.

Knook may also refer to:

- Peter Knook, a character in the children's book The Life and Adventures of Santa Claus
- Knook, a type of crochet hook
- Kosy Knook Court, a bungalow court in Pasadena, California, United States
- Empress (chess), a fairy chess piece that can move like a rook or knight
