= Church of St Peter and St Paul, Heytesbury =

Coordinates: 51.1823°N 2.1086°W

St Peter and St Paul, Heytesbury
- Church of St Peter and St Paul
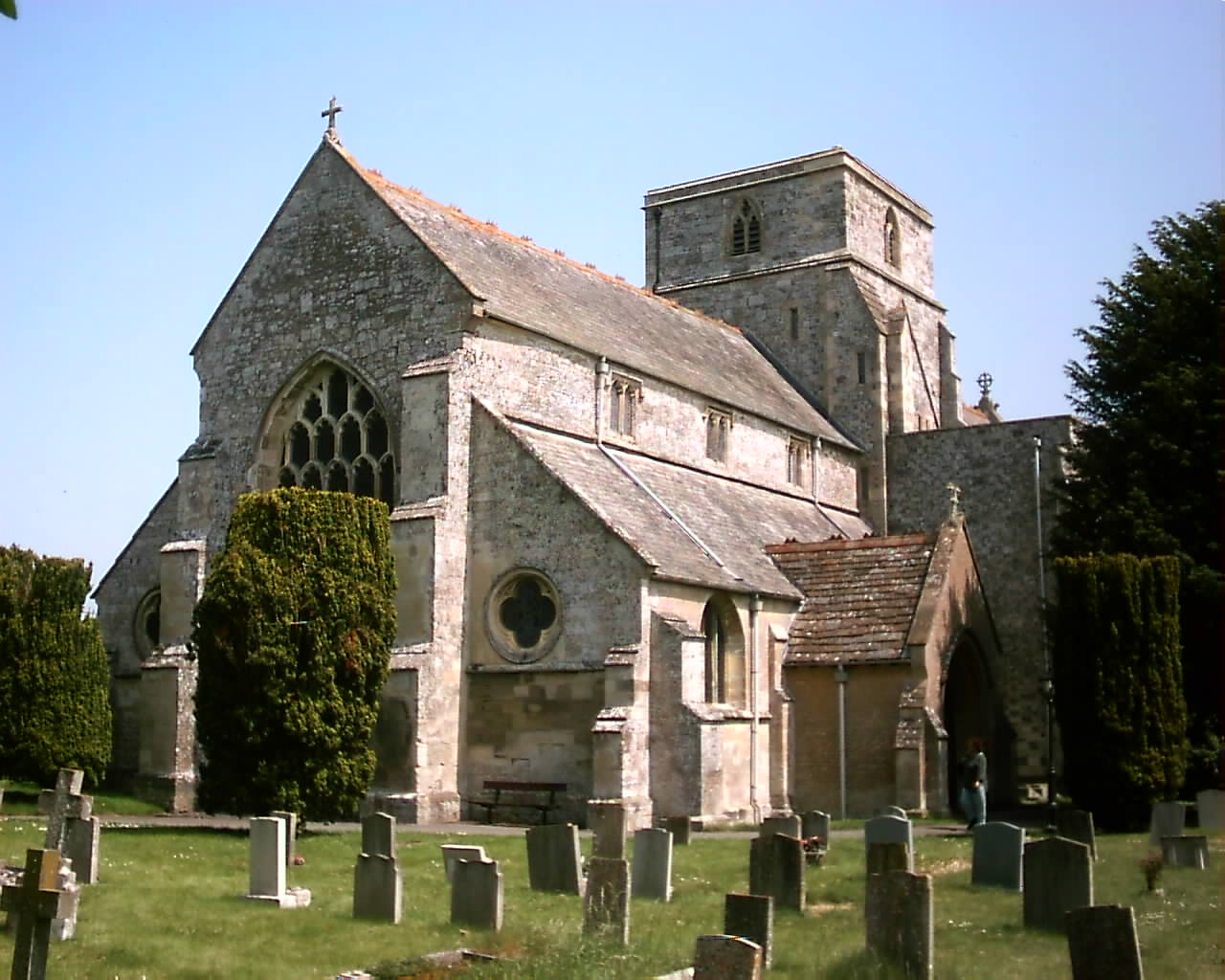

- Location in Wiltshire
- OS grid reference: ST 92504 42549
- Location: Heytesbury, Wiltshire
- Country: England
- Denomination: Anglican
- Website: www.upperwylyevalleyteam.com/our-churches/st-peter-st-paul-heytesbury/

History
- Status: Parish church

Architecture
- Functional status: Active
- Years built: 13th century, restored 1864-7

Administration
- Province: Canterbury
- Diocese: Salisbury
- Archdeaconry: Sarum
- Deanery: Heytesbury
- Parish: Heytesbury with Tytherington and Knook

Clergy
- Rector: vacant
- Dean: Rev'd Caroline Husband

Listed Building – Grade I
- Reference no.: 1036357

The Church of St Peter and St Paul, Heytesbury is the Church of England parish church for the parish of Heytesbury with Tytherington and Knook, Wiltshire, England. It was a collegiate church from the 12th century until 1840. The present building is largely 13th-century and is designated as Grade I listed.

== History ==
A church was mentioned at Hestrebe in the Domesday Book of 1086. The church was given to Salisbury Cathedral by Henry I in about 1115, together with the church of Godalming, Surrey, and lands lying beside the two churches, to form a prebend. Shortly after this the church became collegiate, with the head of the college the canon who held the prebend at the cathedral.

A charter granted by bishop Josceline (or Jocelin) between 1150 and 1160 established four canons at Heytesbury. Their income included tithes from Tytherington, where there was a chapel, and from Horningsham; the churches of Hill Deverill and Swallowcliffe; and land at Wilton. From about 1220 the prebend of Heytesbury was annexed to the deanery of Salisbury, thus the Dean of Salisbury was also Dean of Heytesbury. Most collegiate churches were abolished in 1547 as part of the Reformation but Heytesbury continued until it was suppressed, along with the other remaining non-residential deaneries, by the Ecclesiastical Commissioners Act 1840.

== Architecture and interior ==
The large cruciform church dates from the 13th century, although a fragment of earlier work survives: one pier of the north aisle, with a scalloped capital, is partly from the late 12th century.

The low tower over the crossing was completed in the 14th century and the clerestory was added in the mid-15th.

The south chapel, founded c. 1316, is dedicated to St Catherine. In the north transept, Walter Hungerford founded a chapel in 1421; the 16th-century stone screen survives.

The tower has six bells: the tenor is from c. 1460, alongside two from the 17th century and two from the 18th.

The vestry and the gabled south porch are from the 19th century. Restoration in 1864-7 was by William Butterfield and included rebuilding of the north and south aisles; interior work included the addition of a coloured marble font in the south aisle, new pews, a polychrome tiled floor, and stained glass by Alexander Gibbs. Pevsner criticised the restoration, describing the buildings as "A large and impressive church, but an over-restored one [...] which makes it externally more rewarding from a distance than from near by and internally disappointing in spite of its undeniable grandeur". However, he added that "Most of the glass of Butterfield's restoration is good and characteristic. Pale colours, good leading."

The organ was installed in 1854 by J.W. Walker, having been moved from St Mary's, Bermondsey, London. It was taken down during Butterfield's restoration and reconstructed in 1867 in a new position, with new case fronts in deal.

The building was designated as Grade I listed in 1968.

== Parish ==
Dependent churches and chapels of Heytesbury were those nearby at Tytherington, Knook, Hill Deverill, Horningsham, and the more distant church at Swallowcliffe, some 10 miles (16 km) to the south.

In 1885 the benefice of Heytesbury-with-Tytherington was united with Knook, and this union was reaffirmed in 1970. In 1976 the parishes of Sutton Veny and Norton Bavant were added. Since 2000 the church has been served by the Upper Wylye Valley team. Currently, the position of Team Rector is vacant, as is the position of Vicar following the departure of Rev'd. Clifford Stride in February 2024.

Parish registers survive from 1653 and are held by the Wiltshire and Swindon History Centre at Chippenham.

== Services ==
The benefice holds a Eucharist service in at least two of its churches every Sunday. The current A Church Near You page suggests that Communion is celebrated in Heytesbury on the first Sunday of the month. Choral Evensong is held on the third Sunday of each month.
