= Francis Holmes à Court, 6th Baron Heytesbury =

English farmer and peer

The Lord Heytesbury

Personal details
- Born: Francis William Holmes à Court

Francis William Holmes à Court, 6th Baron Heytesbury (8 November 1931 – 5 October 2004) was a British landowner and peer, serving as a Member of the House of Lords from 1971 until 1999.

== Early life ==
The only child of William Holmes à Court, 5th Baron Heytesbury, and his wife Beryl Crawford, a daughter of Dr Albert Edward Bredin Crawford of Aston Clinton House, Buckinghamshire, the young Francis Holmes à Court was educated at Bryanston School and Pembroke College, Cambridge. He was an exhibitioner of his college and a member of the University's Mountaineering Club.

He was confirmed into the Church of England on 13 March 1945 in St Peter's Church, Codford.

== Career ==
Heytesbury spent most of his early life working full-time for the charity Oxfam. In early middle age, having inherited the peerage and the remains of the family estate at Heytesbury, Wiltshire, he sold some family land and bought Manor Farm, Tarrant Keynston. He learned to farm the land himself and made a success of it. Reaching an age to retire, he sold the farmland but kept Manor Farm House.

He was a member of the House of Lords from 1971 until 1999, when most hereditary peers lost their seats, but rarely spoke there.

== Personal life ==
On 22 September 1962, Francis Holmes à Court married Alison Jean Balfour, daughter of Professor Michael Leonard Graham Balfour and Ethel Grizel Wilson. They had one son, James, who succeeded to the peerage, and a daughter, Camilla.

His sports were mountaineering, gliding, and sailing. He also had a great love of poetry and opera.

== Arms ==
Coat of arms of Holmes à Court, Baron Heytesbury
Crest 1st, Out of a naval crown or, an arm embowed in armour, the hand proper grasping a trident azure headed or; 2nd An eagle displayed sable charged on the body with two chevronels or and holding in the beak a lily slipped proper. Escutcheon Quarterly, 1st and 4th, Barry wavy of six or and azure, on a canton gules a lion of England (Holmes); 2nd and 3rd Per fess or and paly of six erminois and azure, in chief an eagle displayed sable, beaked and membered gules, charged on the body with two chevronels argent (à Court). Supporters Two eagles, wings elevated and displayed sable, beaked and membered gules, each holding in the beak a lily slipped proper. Motto Grandescunt aucta labore (Increased by labour, they grow large)

== Notes ==
Parliament of the United Kingdom
Peerage of the United Kingdom
Preceded by William Leonard Frank Holmes à Court	Baron Heytesbury; 1971–2004	Succeeded by James William Holmes à Court
