= Imber =

Uninhabited village in Wiltshire, England

Coordinates: 51.234°N 2.051°W

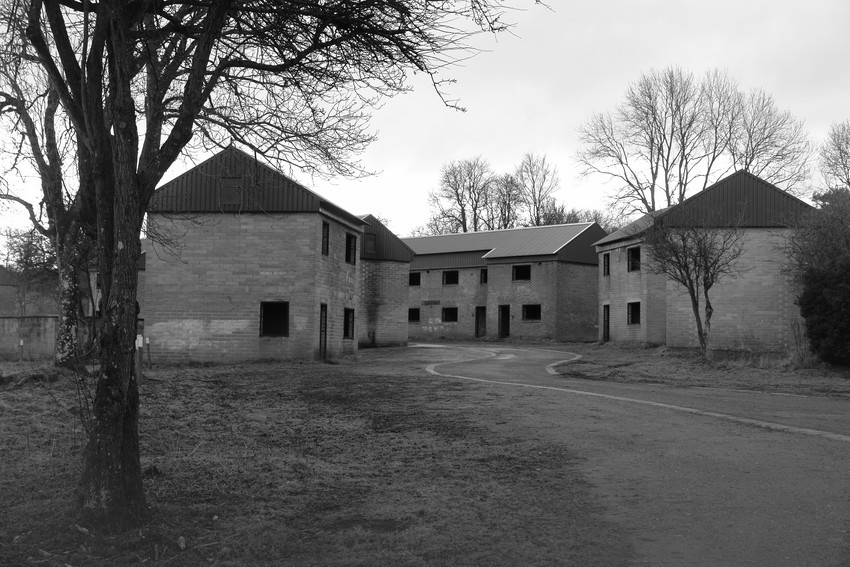
- Part of the Urban warfare training area at Imber; original dwellings in centre

- Location within Wiltshire
- Population: 0
- OS grid reference: ST965485
- Civil parish: Heytesbury
- Unitary authority: Wiltshire
- Ceremonial county: Wiltshire
- Region: South West
- Country: England
- Sovereign state: United Kingdom
- Post town: DEVIZES
- Postcode district: SN10
- Police: Wiltshire
- Fire: Dorset and Wiltshire
- Ambulance: South Western
- UK Parliament: South West Wiltshire

Imber is an uninhabited village and former civil parish within the British Army's training area, now in the parish of Heytesbury, on Salisbury Plain, Wiltshire, England. It lies in an isolated area of the Plain, about 2 1/2 miles (4 km) west of the A360 road between Tilshead and West Lavington. A linear village, its main street follows the course of a stream.

Recorded in the Domesday Book of 1086, Imber was always an isolated community, several miles from any market town, and most of its men worked in agriculture or related trades. Beginning in the 1890s, the Ministry of Defence slowly bought up the village and in 1943 the whole population of about 150 was evicted to provide an exercise area for American troops preparing for the invasion of Europe during the Second World War. After the war, the villagers were not allowed to return to their homes. It remains under the control of the Ministry of Defence despite several attempts by former residents to return. Non-military access is limited to several open days a year.

== History ==
=== Early history ===
Settlement in the area began before the period of Roman rule, in the British Iron Age or earlier. Several ancient trackways lead to and from the village. The first documentary evidence of Imber's existence comes from Saxon times, with a mention of the village in 967. A small settlement called Imembrie with seven households was recorded in the 1086 Domesday Book. The village's church of St Giles dates from the 13th century and has notable wall-paintings from the 15th. By the 14th century the population of the village had risen to around 250, where it is believed to have remained until the 19th century. Population peaked at 440 as recorded in the census of 1851, declining to around 150 by the time of Imber's evacuation.

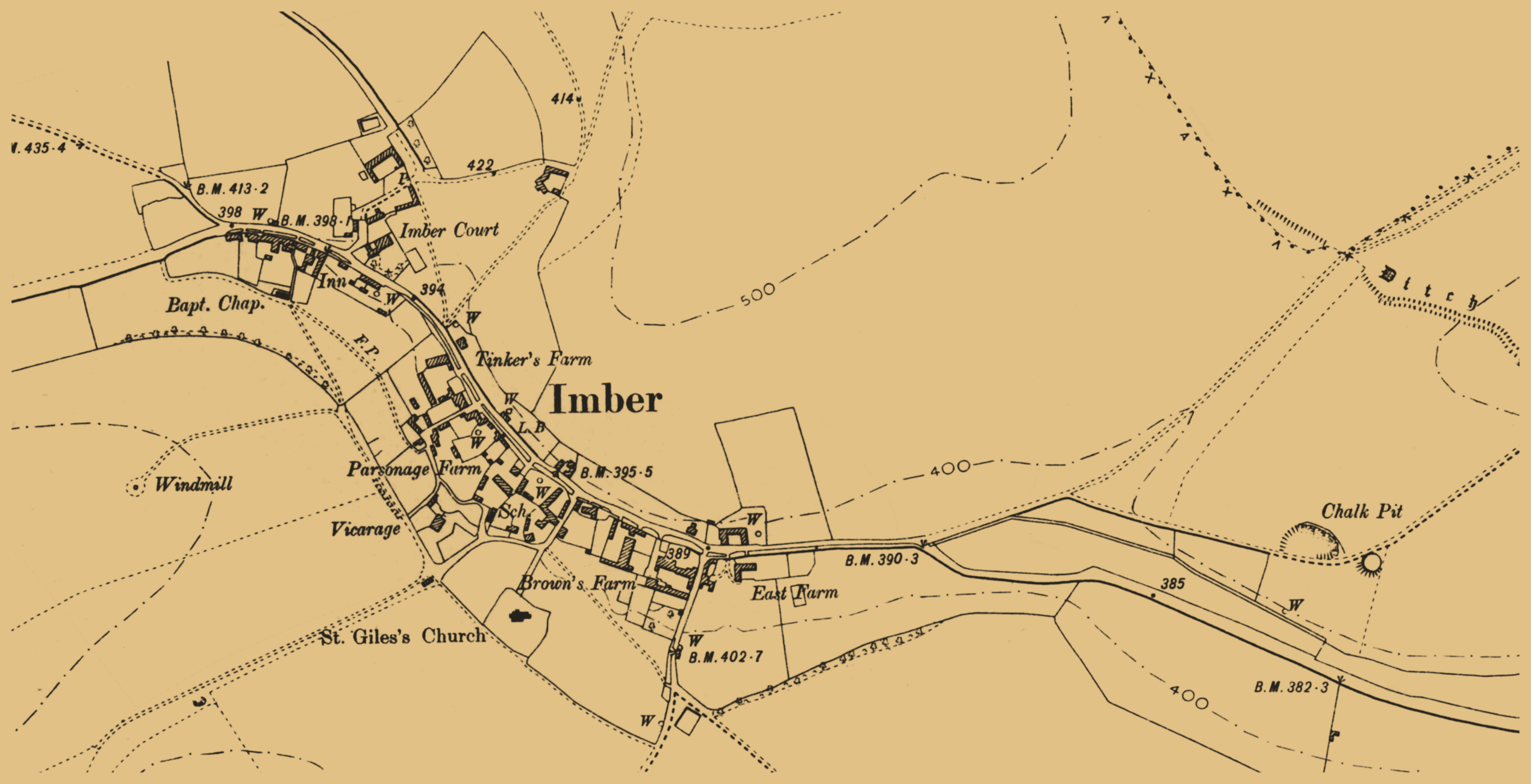
Ordnance Survey map of Imber, 1902

Imber was always an isolated community, Salisbury Plain being relatively sparsely populated. Most of its residents were employed in agriculture or work that directly depended on it. The village had the elongated form of a linear village and its main street followed the course of a stream known as Imber Dock. The only building to survive in a reasonable condition is the church; the rest became derelict or were demolished by the Army. In 1943 there was also a Baptist chapel (built in 1839, demolished in the late 1970s), a post office and a pub called the Bell Inn, which still stands; as do the manor house, Imber Court, and a farmhouse, farm cottages, a small school house and four "council house"-type blocks built in 1938.

=== Eviction and military use ===
In the late 19th century the War Office began buying land on Salisbury Plain, primarily to the east of Imber, and using it for manoeuvres. Beginning in the late 1920s, farms around Imber were bought, as well as the land on which the village sat. The pressures of agricultural depression, combined with the good prices offered by the military, encouraged the sale of land, with few being put off by the new conditions of their tenancy, which allowed the War Office to assume control and evict the residents if necessary. By the time of the Second World War, almost all of the land in and around Imber, except the church, vicarage, chapel, schoolroom and the Bell Inn, belonged to the War Office.

On 1 November 1943, with preparations for the Allied invasion of mainland Europe under way, the people of Imber were called to a meeting in the village schoolroom and given 47 days' notice to leave their homes; Imber was to be used by US forces to practise street fighting. Richard Madigan's evidence to the Defence Lands Committee (DLC) stated that street fighting practice never took place and that his and others' duties were to keep the village in good repair for the villagers' eventual return. The reason for eviction was the village's proximity to shell impact areas.

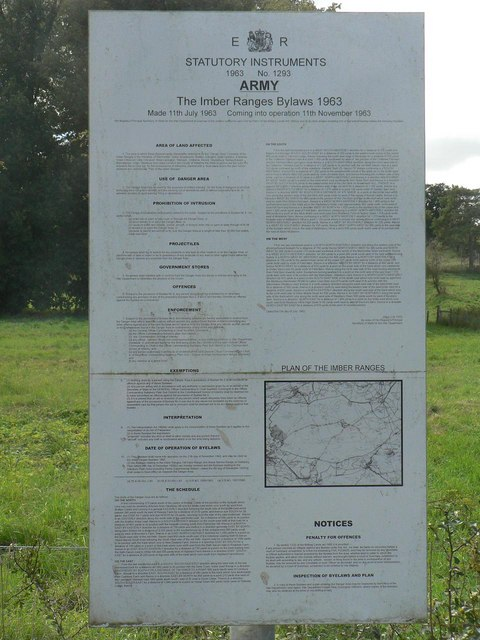
The Imber Ranges by-laws

Although upset about being forced to leave, most villagers put up no resistance, even leaving canned provisions in their kitchens and taking the view that it was their duty to contribute to the war effort in this way – making sacrifices on the Home Front for the greater good. Compensation for the move was limited and the occupants of one farm had to be forcibly evicted by the Army. Albert Nash, who had been the village blacksmith for over 40 years, is said to have been found sobbing over his anvil and later became the first resident to die and be brought back to Imber for burial. It was said that he died of a broken heart after being forced to leave the village.

After the war, the village was used extensively for training, particularly preparing soldiers for service in the urban environments of Northern Ireland during The Troubles, and several empty house-like buildings were constructed in the 1970s to aid training. Since 1988, urban warfare training has been centred at a purpose-built complex at Copehill Down, about 3 miles to the southeast.

The Bell Inn was sold to the MoD in the mid-1950s and the Baptist Chapel in the late 1970s. The civil parish of Imber was eventually incorporated into neighbouring Heytesbury, to the south, while for Church of England purposes the ecclesiastical parish of Imber was incorporated into the parish of Edington, to the north.

=== Restoration attempts ===
Many of the village's buildings suffered shell and explosion damage after the war when UK military operations began and were additionally eroded by the weather, quickly falling into disrepair. Although the villagers had been told they could return in six months, this was never allowed. At the end of the war, efforts were made to restore Imber to its pre-war condition – although there was very little damage – but the decision was taken not to relinquish control. Documentary evidence of a return agreement was only discovered in the 1970s.

In 1961, a rally in the village was organised to demand that the villagers be allowed to move back and over 2,000 people attended, including many former residents. A public inquiry was held and found in favour of Imber's continued military use. The matter was also raised in the House of Lords and it was decided that the church would be maintained and would be open for worship on the Saturday closest to St Giles' Day each year, a practice that continues.

A further attempt to restore Imber took place in the early 1970s, when the Defence Lands Committee (DLC) was given the task of looking into the need for the retention of Ministry of Defence lands. The Imber case was represented before the DLC by David J. Johnson, an Imber researcher; Richard Madigan, a former soldier who helped to evacuate the village – and testified to the promise of return after the war – and Rex Mutters, a wartime fighter pilot. They were assisted by Austin Underwood, who had led the campaign in the early 1960s, and backed-up with written evidence from former villagers. In spite of all the additional evidence, including the first re-appearance since 1943 of the original eviction letter (which indicated return), the DLC recommended that the village be retained for military use.

== Present day ==
The annual church service, on the Saturday nearest to 1 September (St Giles' Day), has been attended by former residents, soldiers who have used the village for training, and the general public. A small number of former residents have been buried in the churchyard, with funeral services held in the church. Since 2009 there has been a carol service on the Saturday before Christmas. The Ministry of Defence is required to allow public access to the village on between one and fifty days a year; in the late 2010s, the open days were reduced to three because of trespassing.

Since 2009, the annual summer opening of the village has been served by Routemaster double-decker buses on a scheduled service from Warminster known as Imberbus, which raises money for charity.

=== St Giles' parish church ===
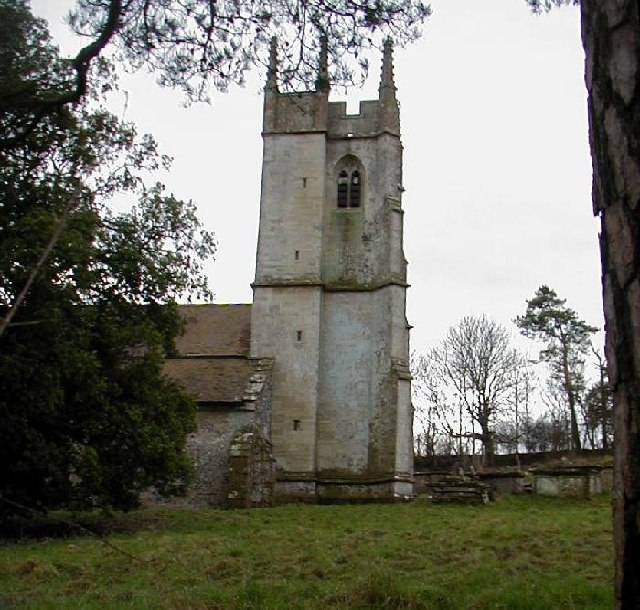
The tower of St Giles' in 2002

Unlike the rest of the parish, St Giles' church and its graveyard remained in the hands of the Diocese of Salisbury, although access remains controlled by the Ministry of Defence. The church was recorded as Grade I listed in 1987.

By 2001 it had become clear, according to a Church of England press release, that St Giles' "was in need of extensive repairs". Since it was not possible for the parochial church council to accept liability for the maintenance of a building to which they only had effective access for worship once a year, the Edington with Imber PCC requested that Imber church be declared redundant, a process which ended in 2005 with the vesting of the church in the Churches Conservation Trust. In the meantime, the church tower had been struck by lightning in 2003, weakening the structure, but restoration work began in 2008 and the annual service resumed in September 2009 upon completion of the repair works.

On 5 January 2023 the burial of Ray Nash took place. Nash, a great nephew of the village blacksmith Albert Nash, was born in Imber and was one of the last recorded baptisms in the church. His father Jim died in 1936 and was also buried at Imber, and Ray Nash had wanted to be reunited with his father upon his death. His funeral is believed to be the last held at Imber.

== Governance ==
In 1961 the parish had a population of 0. On 1 April 1991 the parish was abolished and merged with Heytesbury. A parish council known as "Heytesbury, Imber and Knook" covers this parish and the neighbouring parish of Knook. Although it has no electors, Imber is represented in parliament by the member for South West Wiltshire, Andrew Murrison; and on Wiltshire Council by Christopher Newbury.

With the exception of St Giles' church, the whole of the former parish is owned by the Ministry of Defence and is administered as part of its Salisbury Plain Training Area.

== Popular culture ==
Imber features in the 1965 movie Catch Us If You Can, the debut feature film of director John Boorman and a starring vehicle for the British pop group The Dave Clark Five.

In Victor Canning's 1972 novel for teenagers The Runaways, the cheetah that has escaped from Longleat Safari Park makes a den on the firing range close to Imber and her cubs are found there by the young hero Smiler.

A photograph taken in Imber is featured on the cover of These Four Walls, the 2009 debut album from Scottish indie rock band We Were Promised Jetpacks.

The 2013 novel The Sea Change by Joanna Rossiter centres on the evacuation of Imber and the subsequent experiences of fictional characters from the village in the war and post-war years.

Neil Spring's 2017 novel The Lost Village, a ghost story featuring ghost hunter Harry Price, is set in Imber.

Imber features in the fourth episode of Michael Portillo's Channel 5 series Portillo's Hidden History of Britain broadcast 11 May 2018.

=== Musical references ===
Mount Vernon Arts Lab recorded the instrumental piece Imber by Drew Mulholland and this was released on Earworm Subscription Series in 1998 (WORMSS2).

Little Imber by the Georgian composer Giya Kancheli is a piece for small ensemble, voice, children's and men's choirs. It was performed in the church at Imber in 2003 and the recording released on ECM Records in 2008 (ECM 1812).

The Norwegian electronic duo Kook recorded an album called Imber, Wiltshire of seven wordless compositions all with titles taken from the village and its inhabitants. This was released on Va Fongool Records (VAFCD011).

The Wiltshire folk group The Yirdbards recorded their song The Ghosts of Old Imber at St Giles' Church in the village in October 2013 and released it on CD in 2014 to raise funds for the church.

A song called Imber appears on Convenience Kills, an album by the group Bad Amputee released in 2020 (Ferric Mordant FE11).

A cassette album, Look to Imber, appeared in 2022 on the Modern Aviation label containing 12 experimental or folk-based pieces loosely based on the story of the village.

The Lost Village of Imber is a piece for brass band, composed by Christopher Bond and commissioned by the Bratton Silver Band in 2019 with the support of Arts Council England and The Norman Jones Trust Fund, to celebrate the band's 160th anniversary. It received its first public performance by the Cory Band in 2020 and was first performed by the Bratton Silver Band in September 2022 at Holy Trinity Church in Dilton Marsh, around 9 miles from the site of Imber village. The piece went on to be selected as the test piece for the Third Section at the 2023 National Brass Band Championship of Great Britain.

== Gallery ==
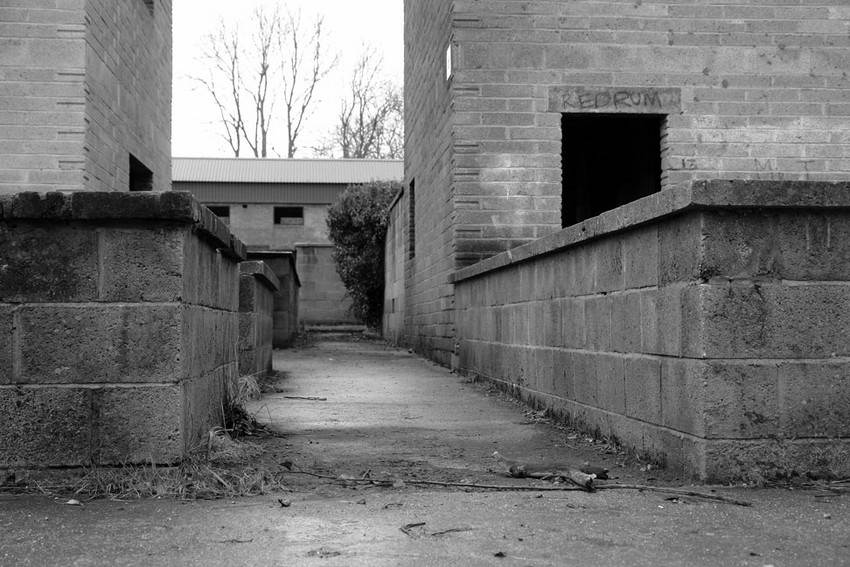

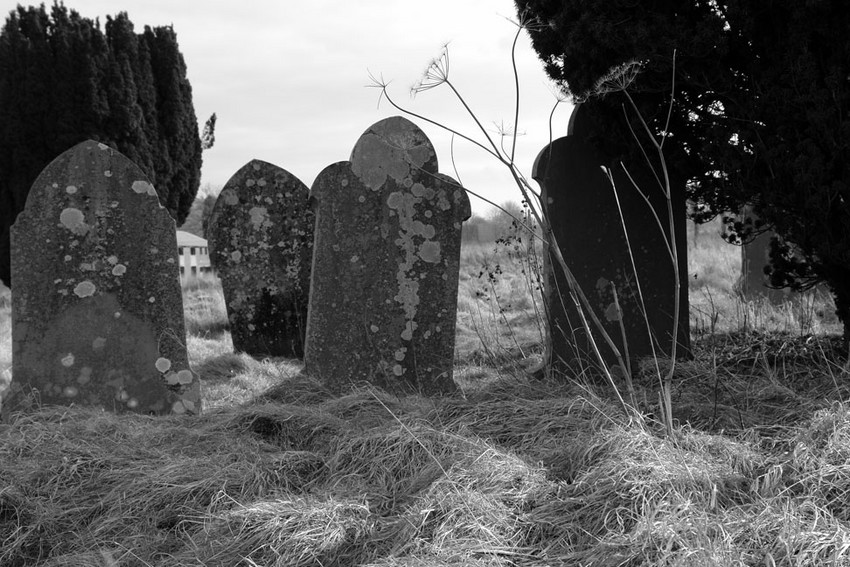
Gravestones in the churchyard

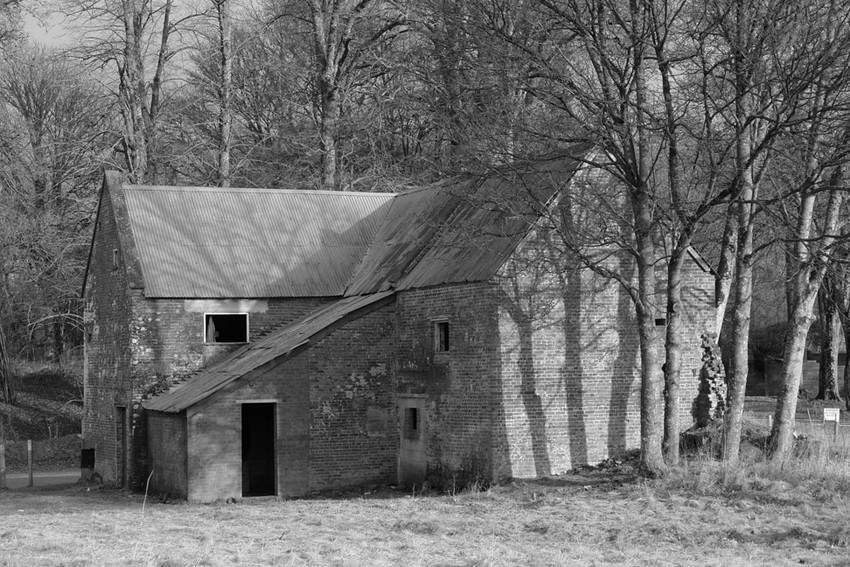

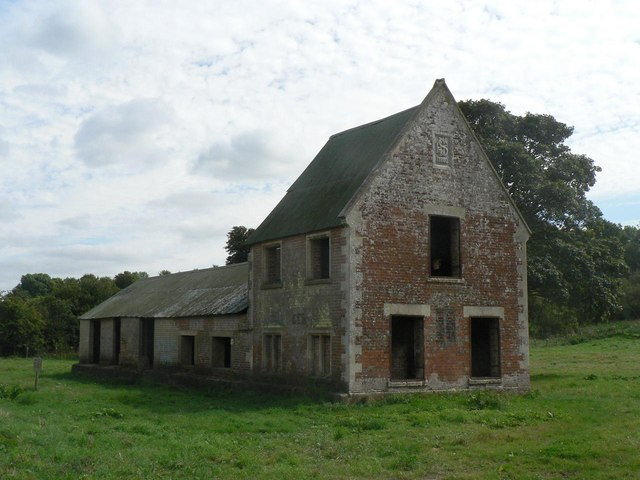
Former Seagrams Farm

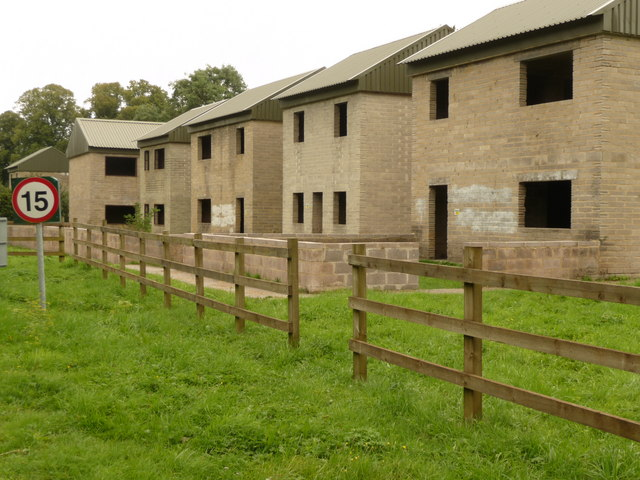
Houses used for training purposes

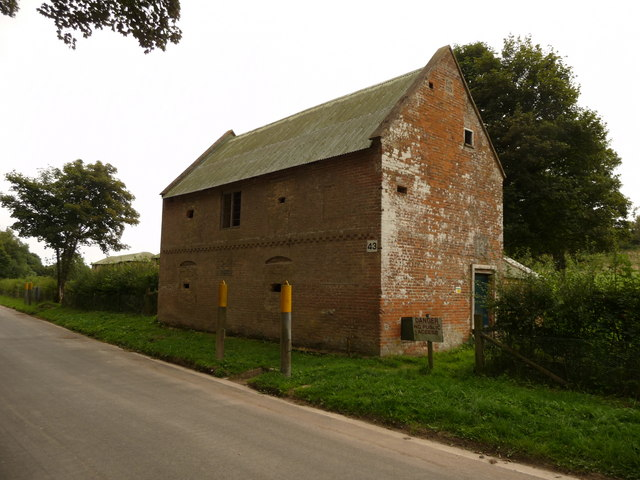
The Bell pub

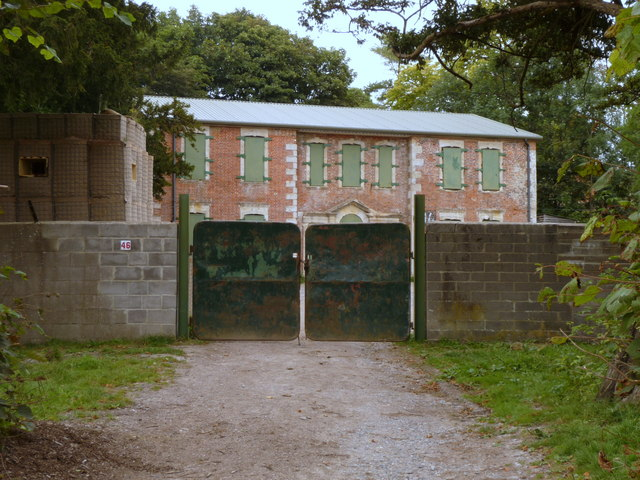
Imber Court

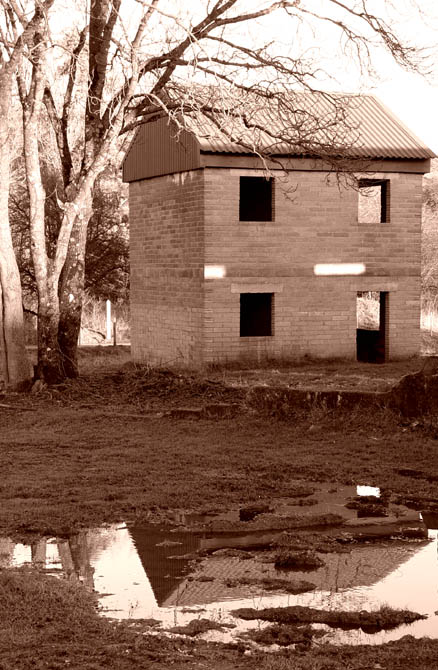

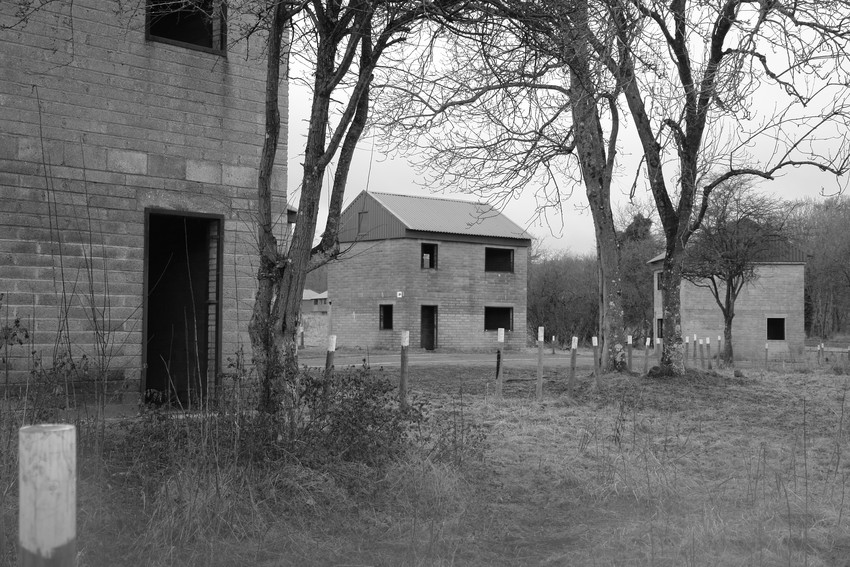

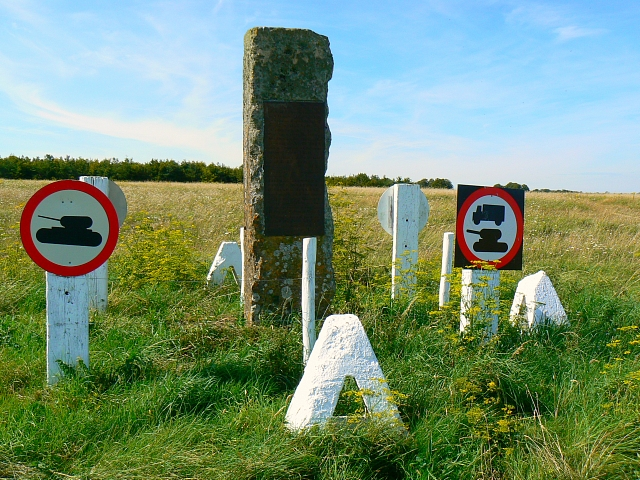
Monument to four highwaymen, Imber Range

== See also ==
- Imber friendly fire incident (1942)
- Tyneham – another village taken over for military purposes
- Langford, Norfolk
- Mynydd Epynt
- The Stanford Battle Area, in Norfolk, contains six villages also taken over for military purposes.

== Sources ==
- Sawyer, Rex L. (2010) [2001]. Little Imber on the Down: Salisbury Plain's Ghost Village (reprint ed.). Hobnob Press. ISBN 978-1-906978-24-2.
