= Leonard Holmes à Court, 4th Baron Heytesbury =

The Right Honourable Leonard Holmes à Court
- Born: Leonard Holmes à Court; 11 June 1863; Upham, Hampshire
- Died: 2 February 1949 (aged 85); Crockerton, Wiltshire
- Burial place: Longbridge Deverill, Wiltshire
- Spouse: Sybil Mary Morris (m. 1896)
- Children: 3
- Relatives: William Leonard Holmes à Court (father); Isabella Sophia Beadon (mother)
- Military career
- Allegiance: United Kingdom
- Branch: British Army
- Service years: 1885–1919
- Rank: Colonel
- Nickname: Lionel
- Unit: Wiltshire Regiment
- Commands: 3rd (Special Reserve) Battalion
- Conflicts: Second Boer War, World War I

Leonard Holmes à Court, 4th Baron Heytesbury (11 June 1863 – 2 February 1949) was a British Army officer, a British peer, landowner in Wiltshire, and a member of the House of Lords from 1903 until his death.

== Early life ==
He was born as the second son of William Leonard Holmes à Court (1835–1885) and his wife Isabella Sophia, a daughter of the Reverend Richard à Court Beadon, whose mother, Annabella à Court (1781–1866) had been a daughter of Sir William à Court, 1st Baronet. His father predeceased his grandfather, thus leaving his eldest brother as the successor to his grandfather's barony.

== Career and military service ==
Heytesbury commissioned as an officer to enter the British Army in 1885, and was gazetted to the Wiltshire Regiment which rotated through various posts of the British Empire, at which time the regiment was dispatched to British India until 1895. In 1899, the regiment was dispatched to South Africa to take part in the Second Boer War. He remained active in the war until June 1902 and returned home on the SS Dominion, which arrived in Southampton that September.

On 15 August 1903, he succeeded his older brother William Holmes à Court as Baron Heytesbury (1828) and as a Baronet (1795) following his death.

Heytesbury retired from active military service in 1913, but returned the following year as a Lieutenant-Colonel at the outbreak of World War I and was made commander of the 3rd (Special Reserve) Battalion of the Wiltshire Regiment which provided reinforcement drafts for regular units serving overseas in wartime. Heytesbury was officially discharged and retired from military service in 1919 and received a brevet rank of colonel upon the completion of his service.

In 1933, Heytesbury sold the family estate, the Heytesbury House in Wiltshire, to poet and writer Siegfried Sassoon. The family then relocated to Green House, Crockerton, Wiltshire where he eventually passed away on 2 February 1949 at age 85.

== Family ==
On 9 September 1896, he married Sybil Mary Morris in Holy Trinity Church, Karachi, India (now Pakistan). She was the daughter of Capt. Frank Bird Morris and Juliet Mary Rawlatt. Capt. Frank Bird Morris was a British commissioned officer serving the British Army. Heytesbury and Sybil Mary had three children:

1. Hon. Sybil Nancy Bowly (née Holmes à Court) (1897-1970), born in Hyderabad. Married Lt Col Geoffrey Richard Marriott Bowly who served the Royal Warwickshire Regiment of the British Army and had two sons.
2. Hon. Betty Mary Robinson à Court (née Holmes à Court) (1902-1991), born in Warminster. Married firstly Commander Vivian John Robinson of the Royal Navy and had two sons and one daughter. Her first marriage ended in divorce in 1946. In 1956, she married a second time to Alfred Esmond Robinson who was the brother of her former spouse.
3. William Leonard Frank Holmes à Court (1906-1971), who succeeded the titles and later became the 5th Baron Heytesbury. He married Beryl Bredin Crawford and had one son.

Peerage of the United Kingdom
Preceded by William Frederick Holmes à Court	Baron Heytesbury; 1903–1949	Succeeded by William Leonard Frank Holmes à Court
