= Baron Heytesbury =

Peerage title in the United Kingdom

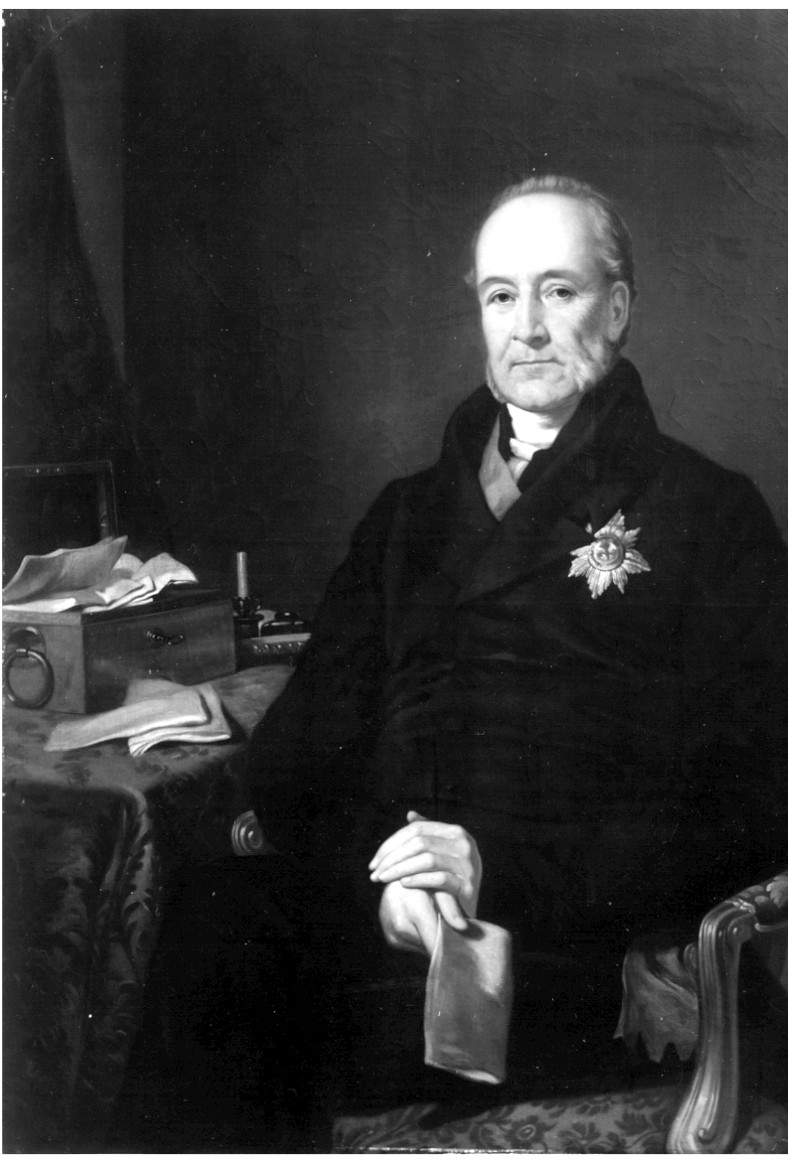
William à Court, 1st Baron Heytesbury

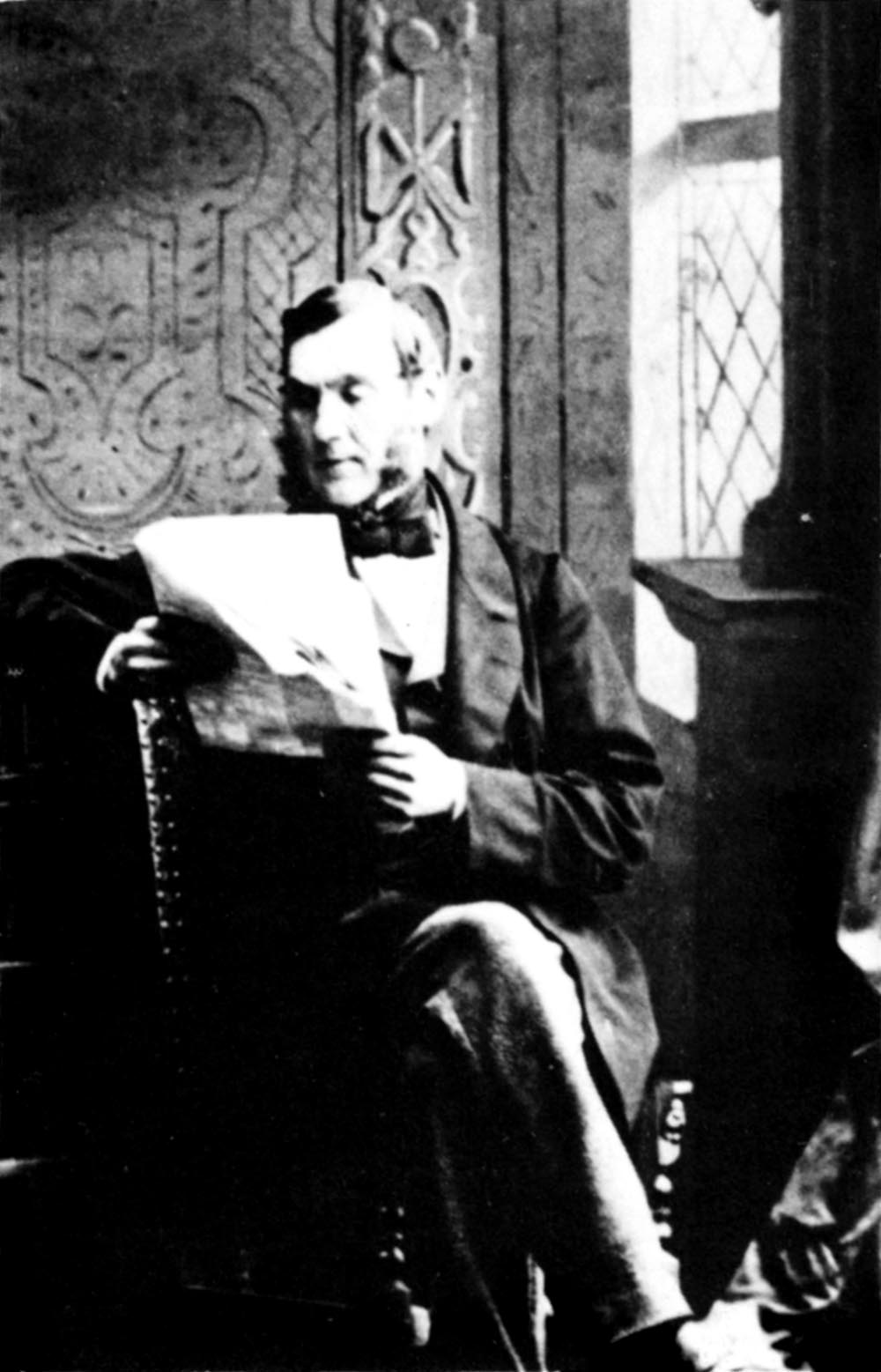
William Henry Ashe Holmes-à Court, 2nd Baron Heytesbury

Baron Heytesbury (pronounced 'Hetsbury'), of Heytesbury in the County of Wiltshire, is a title in the Peerage of the United Kingdom. It was created in 1828 for the prominent politician and diplomat Sir William à Court, 2nd Baronet, who later served as Ambassador to Russia and as Viceroy of Ireland. His son, the second Baron, sat as Member of Parliament for the Isle of Wight. On his marriage in 1837 to Elizabeth Holmes, daughter of Sir Leonard Worsley Holmes, Lord Heytesbury assumed the additional surname of Holmes. His son the 4th baron commanded a battalion in the Wiltshire Regiment (Duke of Edinburgh's) and was for a time in command of 62nd (Wiltshire) Regiment of Foot. As of 2010, the titles are held by his great-great-great-grandson, the seventh Baron, who succeeded his father in 2004.

The baronetcy, of Heytesbury House in the County of Wiltshire, was created in the Baronetage of Great Britain on 4 July 1795 for the first Baron's father, William à Court. He was a colonel in the army and represented Heytesbury in the House of Commons. His father, William Ashe-à Court, was a general in the army and also sat as a Member of Parliament for the rotten borough of Heytesbury.

A junior line of the family has attained fortune and fame in Australia, thanks to the business empire of Robert Holmes à Court, who was of South African birth, and his Western Australian wife Janet, formerly one of Australia's richest women. Their vast business interests are managed through Heytesbury Pty Ltd, a company named after the family peerage.

== à Court baronets, of Heytesbury (1795) ==
- Sir William Pierce Ashe à Court, 1st Baronet (c. 1747–1817)
- Sir William à Court, 2nd Baronet (1779–1860) (created Baron Heytesbury in 1828)

== Barons Heytesbury (1828) ==
- William à Court, 1st Baron Heytesbury (1779–1860)
- William Henry Ashe à Court-Holmes, 2nd Baron Heytesbury (1809–1891)
- William Frederick Holmes à Court, 3rd Baron Heytesbury (1862–1903)
- Leonard Holmes à Court, 4th Baron Heytesbury (1863–1949)
- William Leonard Frank Holmes à Court, 5th Baron Heytesbury (1906–1971)
- Francis William Holmes à Court, 6th Baron Heytesbury (1931–2004)
- James William Holmes à Court, 7th Baron Heytesbury (born 1967)

Barons Heytesbury line of succession
- Colonel Sir William Pierce Ashe à Court, of Heytesbury, 1st Baronet (c. 1747—1817)
  - William à Court, 1st Baron Heytesbury (1779—1860)
    - William Henry Ashe Holmes à Court, 2nd Baron Heytesbury (1809—1891)
      - Hon. William Leonard Holmes à Court (1835—1885)
        - William Frederick Holmes à Court, 3rd Baron Heytesbury (1862—1903)
        - Leonard Holmes à Court, 4th Baron Heytesbury (1863—1949)
          - William Leonard Frank Holmes à Court, 5th Baron Heytesbury (1906—1971)
            - Francis William Holmes à Court, 6th Baron Heytesbury (1931—2004)
              - James William Holmes à Court, 7th Baron Heytesbury (b. 1967)
        - Henry Worsley Holmes à Court (1871—1924)
          - Robert Anthony Pierce Holmes à Court (1905—d.)
          - Peter Worsley Holmes à Court (1912—1966)
            - Michael Robert Hamilton Holmes à Court (1937—1990)
              - (1) Peter Michael Hamilton Holmes à Court (b. 1968)
                - (2) George William Lark Holmes à Court (b. 1999)
                - (3) Robert Hamilton Wim Holmes à Court (b. 1999)
              - (4) Simon Antony Holmes à Court (b. 1972)
                - (5) William Alexander Hazard Holmes à Court (b. 2000)
              - (6) Paul William Holmes à Court (b. 1973)
            - Simon Roger Holmes à Court (1939—1977)
      - Charles George Holmes à Court (1843—1924)
        - Alan Worsley Holmes à Court (1887—1957)
          - Peter Holmes à Court (1925—2006)
            - (7) Alan William Holmes à Court (b. 1953)
            - (8) Campbell Worsley Holmes à Court (b. 1958)
      - Arthur Wyndham Holmes à Court (1848—1915)
        - William Alexander Russell Holmes à Court (1878—1942)
          - William Charles Holmes à Court (1918—1967)
            - (9) William Walter Holmes à Court (b. 1948)
            - (10) Phillip John Holmes à Court (b. 1960)

== Arms ==
Coat of arms of Holmes à Court, Baron Heytesbury
Crest 1st, Out of a naval crown or, an arm embowed in armour, the hand proper grasping a trident azure headed or; 2nd An eagle displayed sable charged on the body with two chevronels or and holding in the beak a lily slipped proper. Escutcheon Quarterly, 1st and 4th, Barry wavy of six or and azure, on a canton gules a lion of England (Holmes); 2nd and 3rd Per fess or and paly of six erminois and azure, in chief an eagle displayed sable, beaked and membered gules, charged on the body with two chevronels argent (à Court). Supporters Two eagles, wings elevated and displayed sable, beaked and membered gules, each holding in the beak a lily slipped proper. Motto Grandescunt aucta labore (Increased by labour, they grow large)

== See also ==
- Walter Hungerford, 1st Baron Hungerford of Heytesbury
- Baron Holmes

Baronetage of Great Britain
Preceded by Murray baronets	à Court baronets of Heytesbury; 4 July 1795	Succeeded by Vanden-Bempde-Johnstone baronets
