= Imber friendly fire incident =

1942 incident in England

Coordinates: 51.234°N 2.051°W

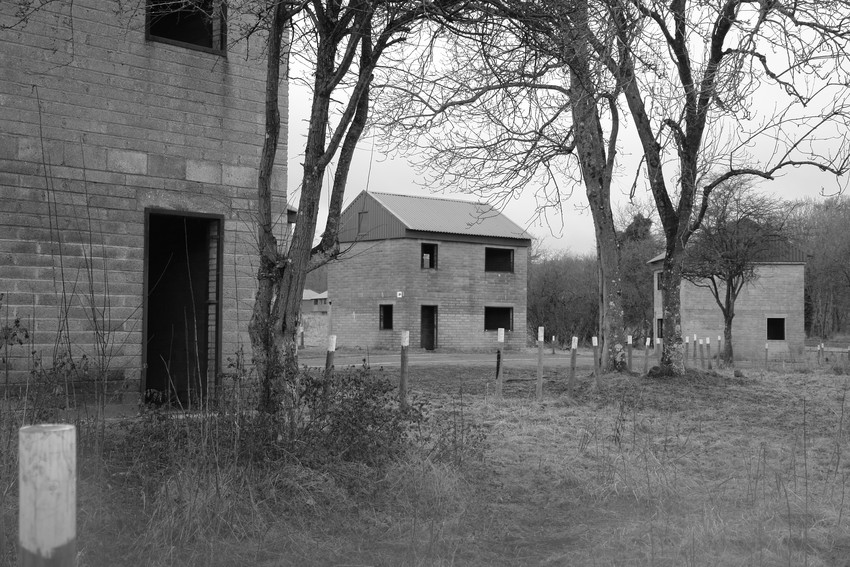
- The houses at the training ground at Imber
- Date: 13 April 1942
- Location: Imber, Wiltshire
- Cause: Pilot error and bad weather
- Deaths: 25
- Injuries: 71

The Imber friendly fire incident took place on 13 April 1942 at Imber in the English county of Wiltshire during the Second World War. One of the Royal Air Force fighter aircraft taking part in a firepower demonstration accidentally opened fire on a crowd of spectators, killing 25 and wounding 71. Pilot error and bad weather were blamed for the incident.

== Incident ==
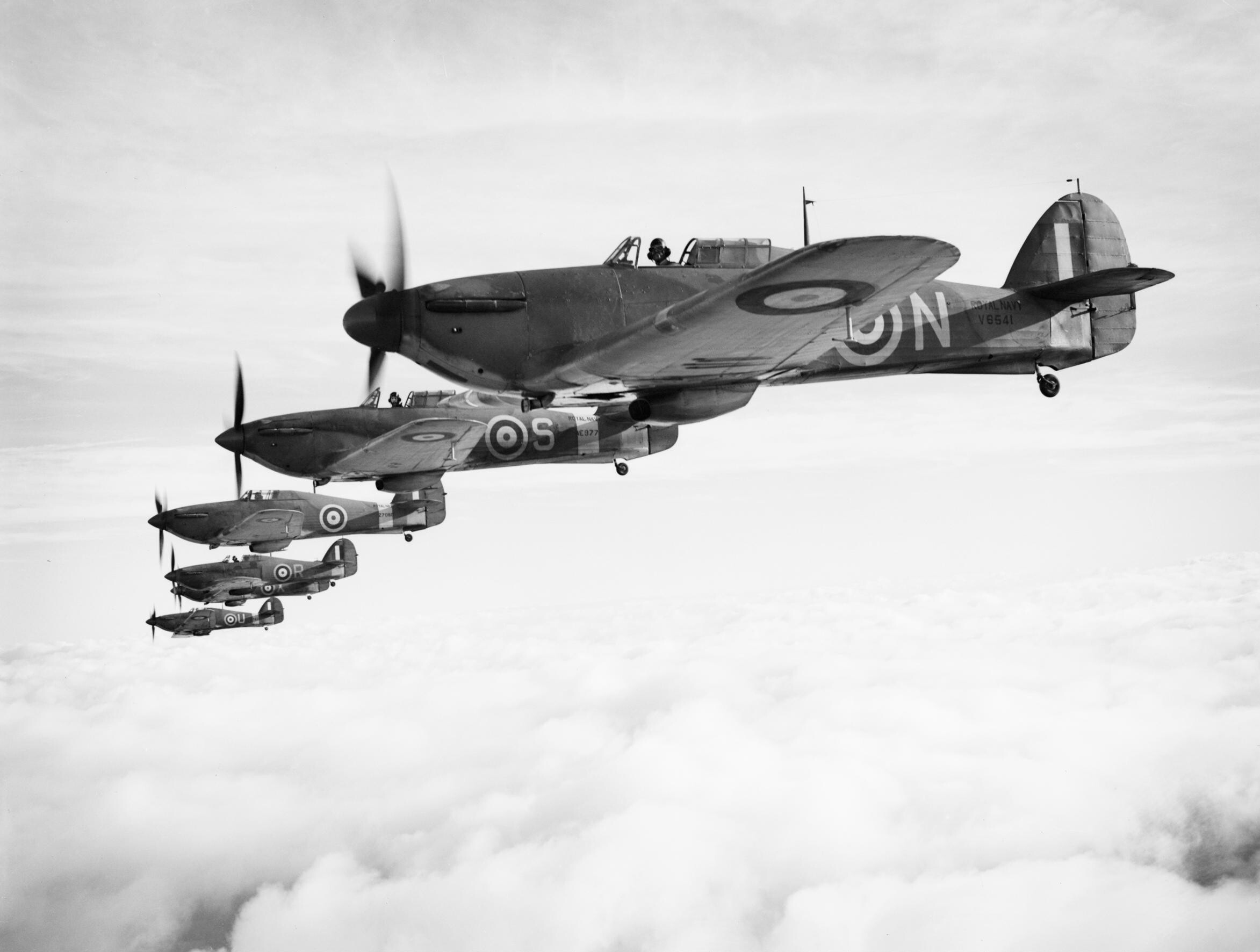
Six Hawker Hurricanes similar to the aircraft involved.

On 13 April 1942, the weather was hazy, and six Royal Air Force (RAF) Hawker Hurricanes from No. 175 Squadron RAF and six Supermarine Spitfires from No. 234 Squadron RAF were being used for a demonstration of tactical airpower at Imber, a British Army training ground on Salisbury Plain in Wiltshire. The event was a dress rehearsal for an upcoming visit by Winston Churchill and General George Marshall, Chief of Staff of the United States Army, and was attended by a number of military personnel. The Spitfires overflew followed by the Hurricanes. Five of the Hurricanes hit the correct targets: several armoured vehicles and mock tanks. The pilot of the sixth Hurricane opened fire at the spectators before continuing with the demonstration. Casualties were 25 military personnel killed and 71 wounded.

The following day the War Office and Air Ministry issued a joint statement:

During combined exercises to-day in Southern England there was an unfortunate accident in which a number of soldiers, including some members of the Home Guard, were killed and other injured. The next-of-kin have been informed.

First reports were that 14 had died with forty to fifty injured but this was later revised to 23 killed on the day (16 officers and seven soldiers). Four of the officers were members of the Home Guard. Two other officers died from wounds in the next few days, one on 14 April the other (a Home Guard officer) on 15 April, to bring the total deaths to 25.

== Inquiry ==
The Court of Inquiry found the pilot, 21-year-old Sergeant William McLachlan, was guilty of making an error of judgement and that the weather at the time contributed to the incident. The pilot of the Hurricane had misidentified the spectators as dummies, thinking that they were part of the demonstration when he opened fire.

An inquest held at Warminster into the 27 deaths (Note: The Times report contradicts other sources that give the total deaths at 25.) recorded that the deaths were caused by gunshot wounds and attributed to misadventure. The RAF pilot told the inquest he lost sight of the aeroplane he was following in the haze and realised he had made a mistake after he fired. While the coroner said that the pilot was British and not American, McLachlan was an American-born Canadian pilot serving in the Royal Canadian Air Force.

== Aftermath ==
The demonstration for Churchill and Marshall went ahead as planned three days later. McLachlan was killed when he was shot down in his Hurricane over France during a night raid on 29 June 1942. On 13 April 2012, a plaque was unveiled on the 70th anniversary of the incident at St Giles' Church, Warminster.
