= William Holmes à Court, 5th Baron Heytesbury =

English landowner and peer

The Right Honourable William Leonard Frank Holmes à Court

Personal details
- Born: William Leonard Frank Holmes à Court; 17 April 1906 Rockley, Devizes, Wiltshire
- Died: 27 November 1971 (aged 65) Heytesbury, Wiltshire
- Spouse: Beryl Bredin Crawford (m. 1926)
- Children: 1
- Parent(s): Leonard Holmes à Court, 4th Baron Heytesbury (father); Sybil Mary Morris (mother)

William Leonard Frank Holmes à Court, 5th Baron Heytesbury of Heytesbury (17 April 1906 – 27 November 1971) was a British landowner and peer, serving as a Member of the House of Lords from 1949 until 1971.

== Early life ==
The only son of Leonard Holmes à Court, 4th Baron Heytesbury, and his wife Sybil Mary Morris, a daughter of Captain Frank Bird Morris, the young Holmes à Court was educated at Pembroke College, Cambridge.

== Career ==
Holmes à Court succeeded as the 5th Baron Heytesbury of Heytesbury, and as a baronet, on 2 February 1949. He was a member of the House of Lords from then until his death in 1971.

== Personal life ==
On 11 May 1926, Holmes à Court married Beryl Bredin Crawford, a daughter of Dr Albert Edward Bredin Crawford. They had an only child, Francis Holmes à Court, 6th Baron Heytesbury (1931–2004), who in 1971 succeeded to the peerage and baronetage.

== Arms ==
Coat of arms of Holmes à Court, Baron Heytesbury
Crest 1st, Out of a naval crown or, an arm embowed in armour, the hand proper grasping a trident azure headed or; 2nd An eagle displayed sable charged on the body with two chevronels or and holding in the beak a lily slipped proper. Escutcheon Quarterly, 1st and 4th, Barry wavy of six or and azure, on a canton gules a lion of England (Holmes); 2nd and 3rd Per fess or and paly of six erminois and azure, in chief an eagle displayed sable, beaked and membered gules, charged on the body with two chevronels argent (à Court). Supporters Two eagles, wings elevated and displayed sable, beaked and membered gules, each holding in the beak a lily slipped proper. Motto Grandescunt aucta labore (Increased by labour, they grow large)

== Notes ==
Parliament of the United Kingdom
Peerage of the United Kingdom
Preceded by Leonard Holmes à Court	Baron Heytesbury; 1949–1971	Succeeded by Francis William Holmes à Court
