= Tytherington Down =

Protected area in Wiltshire, England

Coordinates: 51.14569°N 2.12718°W

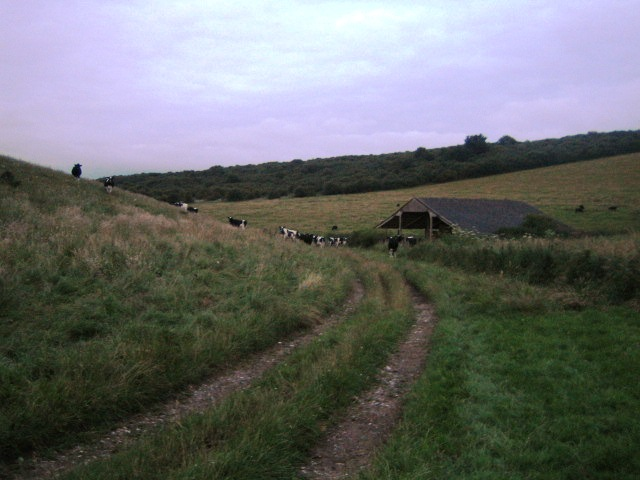
Tytherington Down

Tytherington Down (grid reference ST912385) is a 5.9 hectares (15 acres) biological Site of Special Scientific Interest in Wiltshire, England, notified in 1975. The site spans a dry valley some 1 1/2 miles (2.4 km) south of the village of Tytherington and 5 miles (8 km) southeast of Warminster.

== Sources ==
- Natural England citation sheet for the site (accessed 25 May 2023)
