= William Holmes à Court, 3rd Baron Heytesbury =

The Right Honourable The Lord Heytesbury
- Born: William Frederick Holmes à Court; 25 June 1862; Wells, Somerset
- Died: 15 August 1903 (aged 41); Heytesbury, Wiltshire
- Education: Eton College
- Spouse: Margaret Anna Harman (m. 1887)
- Children: 2
- Parents: William Leonard Holmes à Court (father); Isabella Sophia Beadon (mother)

William Frederick Holmes à Court, 3rd Baron Heytesbury (25 June 1862 – 15 August 1903) was a British peer and landowner in Wiltshire, a member of the House of Lords from 1891 until his death.

== Background and education ==
He was the elder son of William Leonard Holmes à Court (1835–1885) and his wife Isabella Sophia, a daughter of the Reverend Richard à Court Beadon, whose mother, Annabella à Court (1781–1866) had been a daughter of Sir William à Court, 1st Baronet.

== Career ==
On 21 April 1891, he succeeded his grandfather William à Court-Holmes as Baron Heytesbury (1828) and as a Baronet (1795). He was a Justice of the Peace for Wiltshire.

== Family ==
On 19 November 1887, he married Margaret Anna Harman, daughter of John Nixon Harman and Margaret Elizabeth Day, and they had two children:

1. Margaret Elinor FitzHerbert (née Holmes à Court) (1888–1957), married in 1907 to Henry Edward FitzHerbert, a younger son of Sir Richard FitzHerbert, 5th Baronet, who later became a Church of England clergyman. They had four daughters and three sons, including Sir John Richard Frederick FitzHerbert, 8th Baronet (1913–1989), who inherited the Tissington Hall estate in 1963.
2. William Leonard Holmes à Court (born and died 1889)

His sudden death at the age of 41 came as a shock, as he was thought to be in excellent health.

== Land-holding ==
Heytesbury's entry in Who's Who 1903 said he "owned about 13,400 acres" and lived at Heytesbury, Wiltshire, and Westover, Newport, Isle of Wight. He died in 1903, at Heytesbury House, and since 1901 had been master of the South and West Wilts Hunt. He was succeeded by his younger brother, Leonard Holmes à Court.

== Notes ==
Peerage of the United Kingdom
| Preceded by William Henry Ashe Holmes-à Court | Baron Heytesbury; 1891–1903 | Succeeded by Leonard Holmes à Court |
