= Tytherington, Wiltshire =

Village in Wiltshire, England

Coordinates: 51.170°N 2.121°W

Tytherington
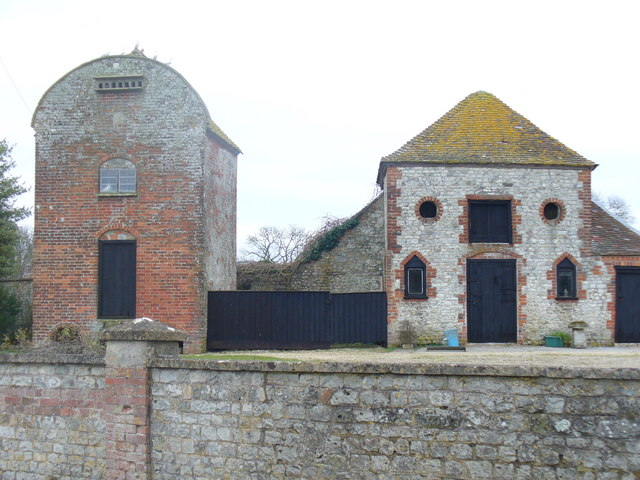
- The 19th-century dovecote (left) and granary (right)

- Location within Wiltshire
- OS grid reference: ST916412
- Civil parish: Heytesbury
- Unitary authority: Wiltshire
- Ceremonial county: Wiltshire
- Region: South West
- Country: England
- Sovereign state: United Kingdom
- Post town: Warminster
- Postcode district: BA12
- Dialling code: 01985
- Police: Wiltshire
- Fire: Dorset and Wiltshire
- Ambulance: South Western
- UK Parliament: South West Wiltshire
- Website: Parish Council

Tytherington is a small village in Wiltshire, in the southwest of England. It lies on the south side of the Wylye valley, about 3 1/2 miles (6 km) southeast of the town of Warminster and 1 mile (1.6 km) southwest of the larger village of Heytesbury. Most of the village is now part of the civil parish of Heytesbury although a few houses in the west are within the parish of Sutton Veny.

John Marius Wilson's Imperial Gazetteer of England and Wales (1870-1872) said of Tytherington:

TYTHERINGTON, a parish in Warminster district, Wilts; 1 mile S by W of Heytesbury r. station. Post town, Warminster. Acres, 1,650. Real property, £1,137. Pop., 111. Houses, 23. The living is a curacy in the diocese of Salisbury. Value, not reported – Patron, the Bishop of Salisbury.

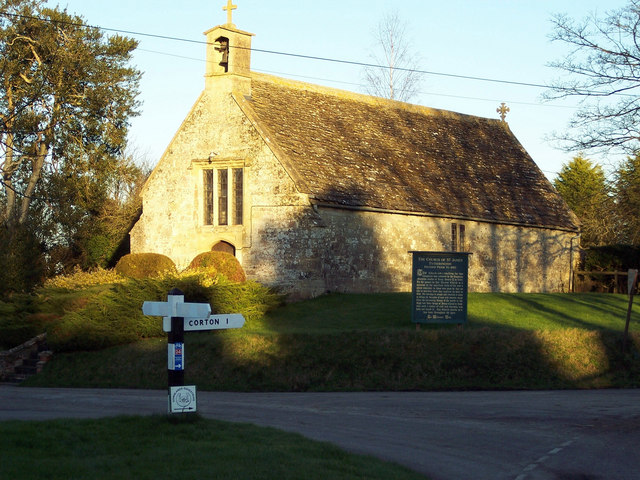
St James' Church, Tytherington

The small Anglican Church of St James is Grade II* listed. A church was founded here in the early 12th century but the present building is mainly from the 16th, and was restored in 1891 by C.E. Ponting. It has always been a chapel of St Peter and St Paul at Heytesbury; it has no graveyard. Today the parish is served by the Upper Wylye Valley team ministry.

Manor Farmhouse, at the north entrance to the village, is a 4-bay 2-storey house from the early 18th century, extended and altered in the 19th. In the Sutton Veny part of the village, Ashbys (formerly Tytherington Farmhouse) carries a date of 1771; nearby are a dovecote dated 1810 and a granary and stable of similar date.

Tytherington Down is a biological Site of Special Scientific Interest.
