= William à Court, 1st Baron Heytesbury =

British diplomat and Conservative politician (1779–1860)

The Right Honourable The Lord Heytesbury GCB PC
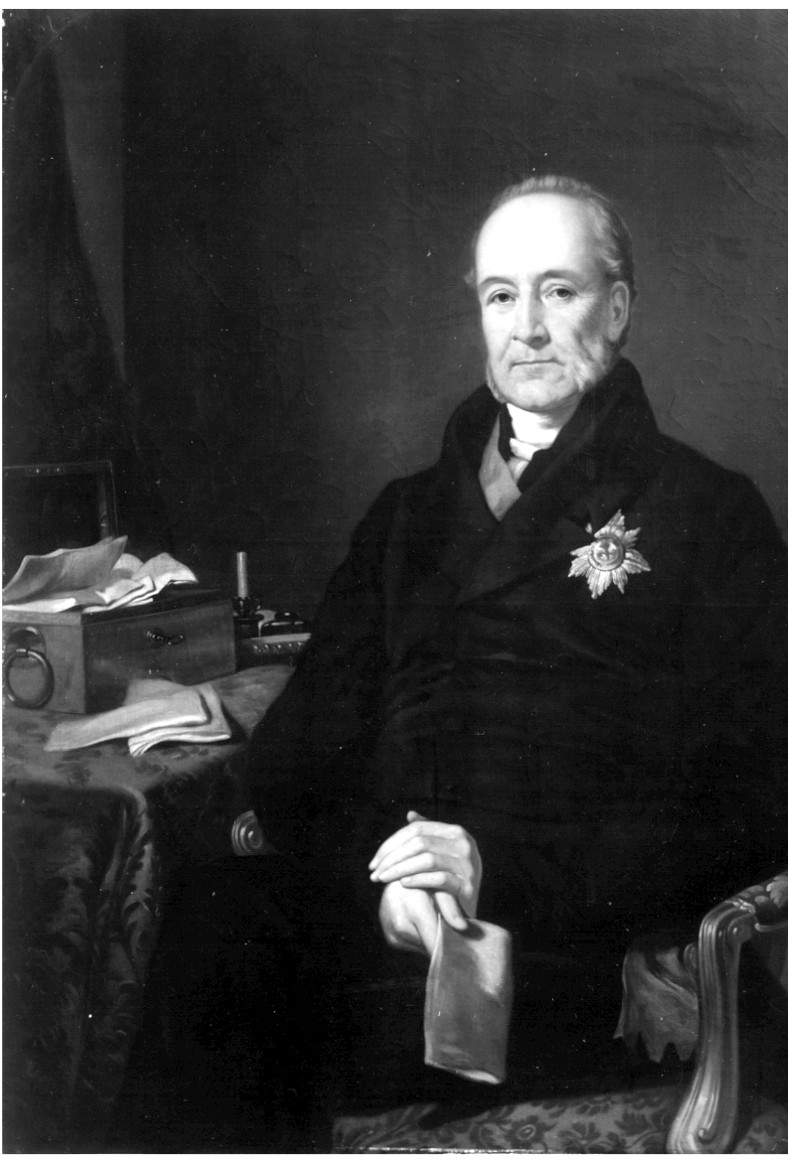

Lord Lieutenant of Ireland
- In office 17 July 1844 – 8 July 1846
- Monarch: Victoria
- Prime Minister: Sir Robert Peel, Bt
- Preceded by: The Earl de Grey
- Succeeded by: The Earl of Bessborough

Personal details
- Born: 11 July 1779 The Close, Salisbury, Wiltshire
- Died: 31 May 1860 (aged 80) Heytesbury, Wiltshire
- Party: Tory
- Spouse: Maria Rebecca Bouverie (m. 1808; died 1844)
- Children: William Henry, 2nd Baron Heytesbury; Cecilia Maria Daly
- Parent(s): Sir William Pierce Ashe à Court, 1st Baronet; Laetitia Wyndham
- Education: Eton College

William à Court, 1st Baron Heytesbury (11 July 1779 – 31 May 1860), known as Sir William à Court, 2nd Baronet, from 1817 to 1828, was an English diplomat and Conservative politician.

== Background and education ==
Heytesbury was the eldest son of Sir William Pierce Ashe à Court, 1st Baronet, and Laetitia, daughter of Henry Wyndham. He was educated at Eton and entered the Diplomatic Service at an early age.

== Political and diplomatic career ==
In 1812 Heytesbury was elected to the House of Commons for Dorchester, a seat he held until 1814. He was also Envoy Extraordinary to the Barbary States from 1813 to 1814, to the Kingdom of Naples in 1814 and to Spain from 1822 to 1824 and served as Ambassador to Portugal between 1824 and 1828.

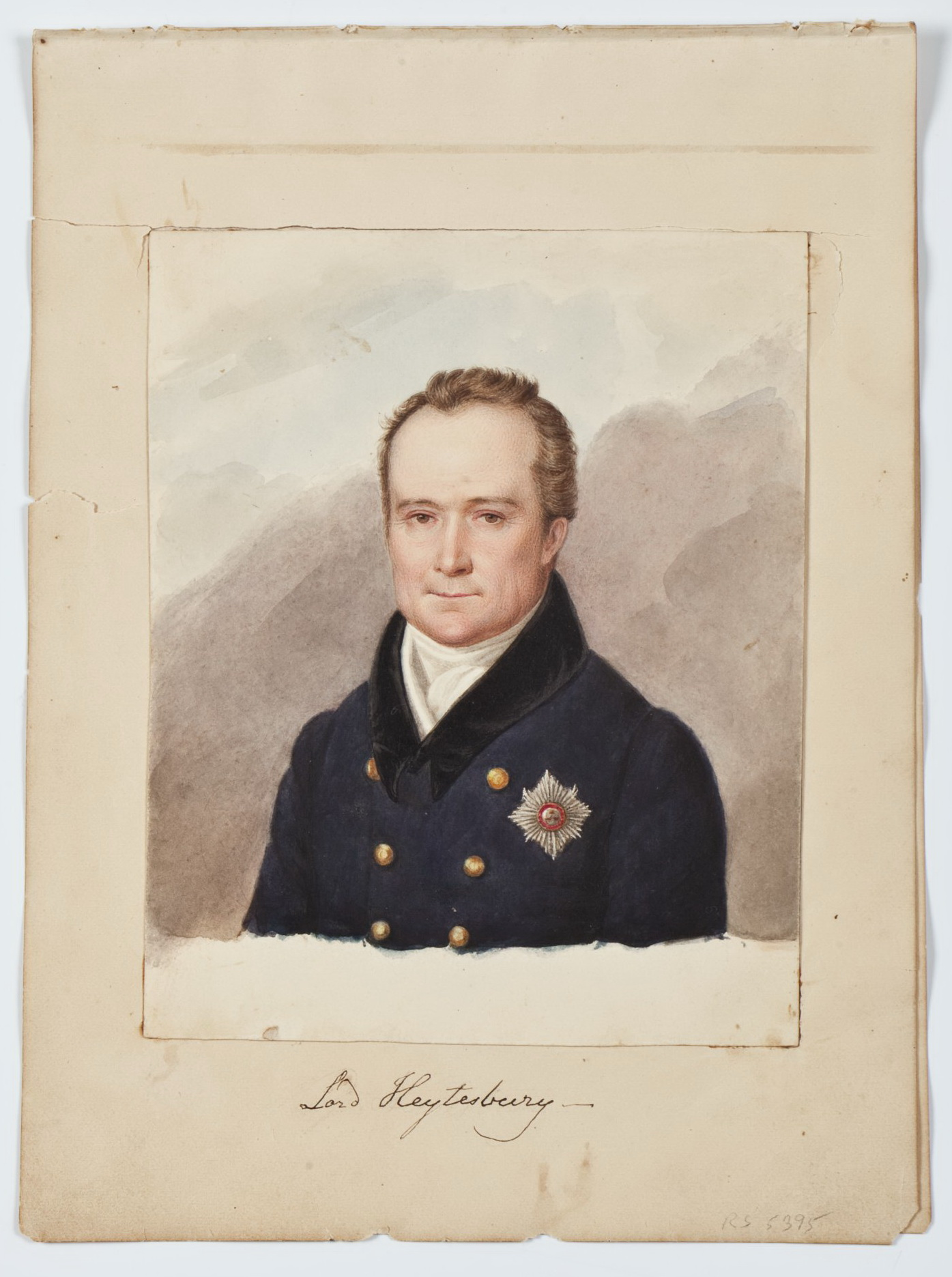
During 1820s in Russia

The latter year Heytesbury was appointed Ambassador to Russia, where he had to deal with the Russo-Turkish War of 1828 to 1829 and the tensions created by the Russian Empire's occupation of the Danubian Principalities. He remained in Russia until 1832. In 1835 Sir Robert Peel nominated him for the office of Governor-General of India, but the Tory government soon fell and he never took up the post. However, he later served under Peel as Lord-Lieutenant of Ireland from 1844 to 1846, and presided over the beginning of the Great Famine (Ireland). Heytesbury succeeded his father as second Baronet in 1817, was admitted to the Privy Council the same year and made a GCB in 1819. In 1828 he was raised to the peerage as Baron Heytesbury, of Heytesbury in the County of Wiltshire.

== Family ==
Lord Heytesbury married Maria Rebecca, daughter of the Hon. William Henry Bouverie and Bridget Douglas, on 30 October 1808 in St George's, Hanover Square. They had four sons and two daughters:

1. Hon. William Henry Holmes à Court (1809-1891), who succeeded the titles and later became the 2nd Baron Heytesbury. He married Elizabeth Worsley-Holmes, daughter of Sir Leonard Thomas Worsley-Holmes, 9th Baronet, in 1833. The union created the Ashe à Court-Holmes (later changed to Holmes à Court) family name and lineage. They had ten sons and five daughters.
2. Gertrude Laetitia Ashe à Court (1810-1816), born in London and died in childhood of scarlet fever.
3. Hon. Cecilia Maria Daly (née Ashe à Court) (1811-1889), married Hon. Robert Daly, the fifth son of James Daly, 1st Baron Dunsandle and Clanconal, and with whom had three sons and three daughters. Robert Daly served as the Aide-de-Camp and State Steward to the Lord-Lieutenant of Ireland.
4. Herbert Ashley Ashe à Court (born and died 1814), born in Naples and died in infancy.
5. Arthur Edward Ashe à Court (1815-1816), born in Naples and died in infancy.
6. Hon. Frederick Ashe à Court (1818-1840), born in Naples and died at the age of 22.

== Arms ==
Coat of arms of William à Court, 1st Baron Heytesbury
Crest An eagle displayed sable charged on the body with two chevronels or and holding in the beak a lily slipped proper. Escutcheon Per fess or and paly of six erminois and azure, in chief an eagle displayed sable, beaked and membered gules, charged on the body with two chevronels argent. Supporters Two eagles, wings elevated and displayed sable, beaked and membered gules, each holding in the beak a lily slipped proper. Motto Grandescunt aucta labore (Increased by labour, they grow large) Orders Order of the Bath - Knight Grand Cross (GCB)

== Sources ==
- Stephen, Leslie; Lee, Sidney, eds. (1891). "Heytesbury, William A'Court" . Dictionary of National Biography. Vol. 26. London: Smith, Elder & Co.
- Kidd, Charles; Williamson, David, eds. (1990). Debrett's Peerage and Baronetage. London and New York: St Martin's Press.
- Burke's Peerage and Baronetage, 107th edn., (London, 2003)
- Debrett's Peerage (London, 2002)
- William A Court, 1st Baron Heytesbury, archived from the original on 8 June 2008

Parliament of the United Kingdom
Preceded by Charles Henry Bouverie; Robert Williams	Member of Parliament for Dorchester; 2 seat constituency (with Robert Williams); 1812–1814	Succeeded by Robert Williams; Sir Samuel Shepherd
Diplomatic posts
Preceded by Henry Wellesley	British Ambassador to Spain; 1822–1825	Succeeded by Frederick Lamb
Preceded by Sir Edward Thornton	British Ambassador to Portugal; 1824–1827	Succeeded by Hon. Sir Frederick Lamb
Preceded by The Viscount Strangford	British Ambassador to Russia; 1828–1832	Succeeded by Sir Stratford Canning
Political offices
Preceded by The Earl de Grey	Lord Lieutenant of Ireland; 1844–1846	Succeeded by The Earl of Bessborough
Honorary titles
Preceded by The Earl of Malmesbury	Governor of the Isle of Wight; 1841–1857	Succeeded by The Viscount Eversley
Peerage of the United Kingdom
New creation	Baron Heytesbury; 1828–1860	Succeeded by William à Court-Holmes
Baronetage of Great Britain
Preceded by William à Court	Baronet (of Heytesbury); 1817–1860	Succeeded by William à Court-Holmes
