= St Giles' Church, Imber =

St Giles' Church
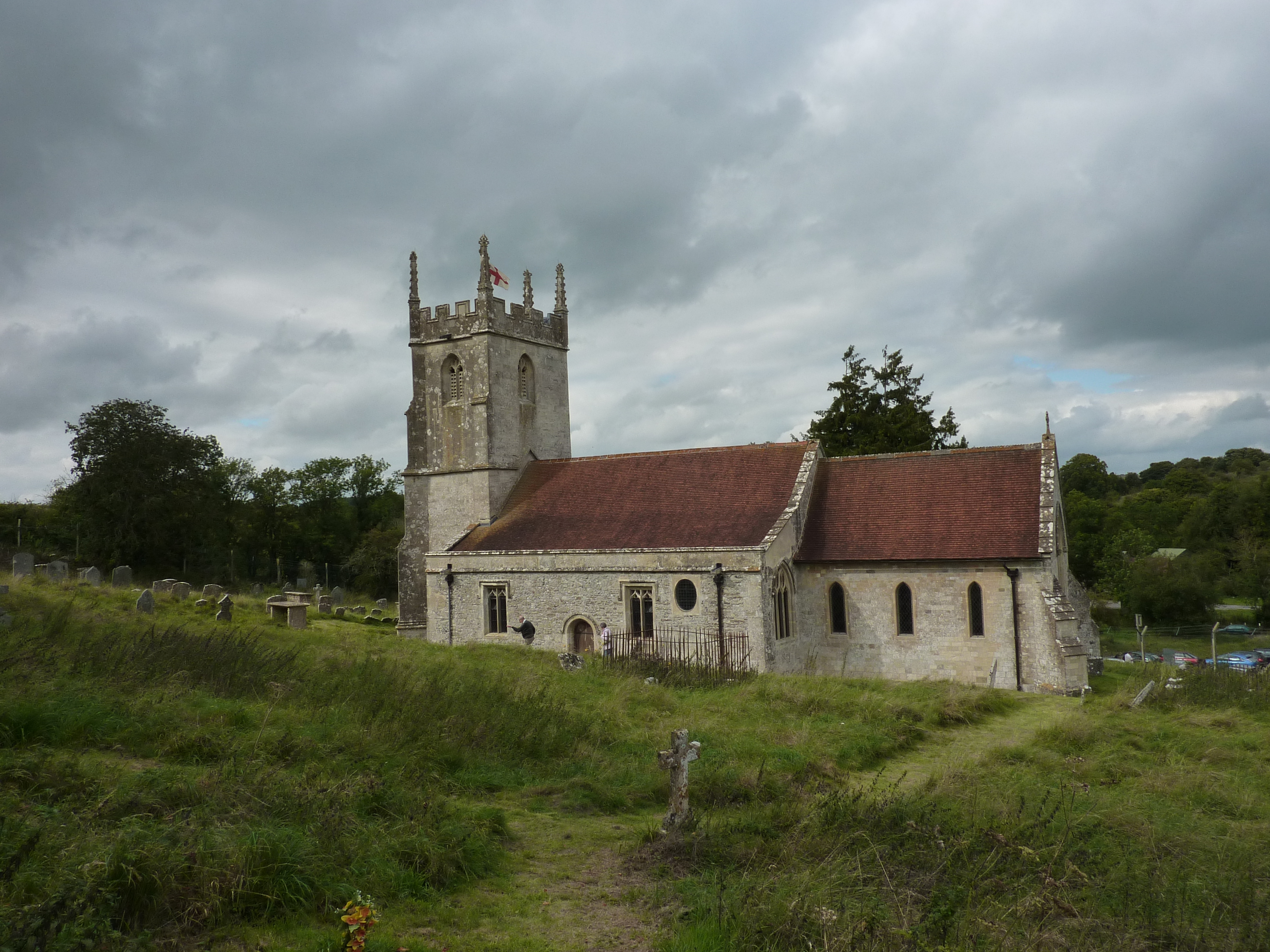

- Location within Wiltshire
- 51.2345°N 2.0513°W
- Location: Imber, Wiltshire, England

History
- Built: late 13th century

Listed Building – Grade I
- Official name: Church of St Giles
- Designated: 11 December 1987
- Reference no.: 1036472

St Giles' Church is in the deserted village of Imber, Wiltshire, England, which since 1943 has been within the British Army's training area on Salisbury Plain. The church was built in the late 13th or early 14th century. It is recorded in the National Heritage List for England as a Grade I listed building, and is now a redundant church in the care of the Churches Conservation Trust. It was declared redundant on 1 November 2002 and was vested in the Trust on 14 September 2005. Public access to it is severely restricted due to its military setting.

== History ==
The church was built of dressed limestone in the late 13th century, replacing a church which had stood on the site since the 12th century. The tower with its five pinnacles, and the north and south aisles, followed in the 14th century. Extensive rebuilding was undertaken in the 19th century. The church no longer has its pews or other fittings; the remains of medieval paintings can still be seen on the walls, including a set of 17th-century bell ringing changes painted on the north wall of the tower.

The village is part of the British Army's training grounds on Salisbury Plain. The entire civilian population was evicted in 1943 to provide an exercise area for American troops preparing for the invasion of Europe during the Second World War. After the war, villagers were not allowed to return to their homes, so the church's font was moved to Brixton Deverill, the pulpit to Winterbourne Stoke and the seating, bell and two effigies to Edington Priory. The village, which is still classed as an urban entity, remains under the control of the Ministry of Defence despite several attempts by former residents to return. Non-military access is limited to a few days a year. Unlike the rest of the parish, St Giles's church and its graveyard remained in the hands of the Diocese of Salisbury, although access to them was and is controlled by the Ministry of Defence.

For Church of England purposes, the ecclesiastical parish of Imber was incorporated into the parish of Edington, to the north.

== Restoration ==
By 2001, according to a Church of England press release, St Giles's "was in need of extensive repairs." Since it was "not possible for the parochial church council to accept liability for the maintenance of a building to which they only had effective access for worship once a year", the Edington-with-Imber PCC requested that Imber church be declared redundant, setting in train a legal process which ended in 2005 with the vesting of the church in the Churches Conservation Trust. In the meantime, the church tower had been struck by lightning in 2003, weakening the structure. Restoration commenced in 2008 and the permitted annual service of public worship resumed in September 2009 on completion of the works.

After extensive restoration, a ring of six bells was installed in August 2010.

== Open days and current use ==
Open days and occasional events such as music performances are held on days when public access to the village is permitted by the Ministry of Defence. These are typically at Easter and during August. Public access to the church and village site is strictly prohibited at other times.

Small numbers of former residents have been buried in the churchyard; a report on the 2023 burial of Ray Nash (whose family had left the village in 1936) stated that the previous funeral had taken place ten years earlier.

== See also ==
- List of churches preserved by the Churches Conservation Trust in Southwest England
