= Kosy Knook Court =

- U.S. National Register of Historic Places
- U.S. Historic district
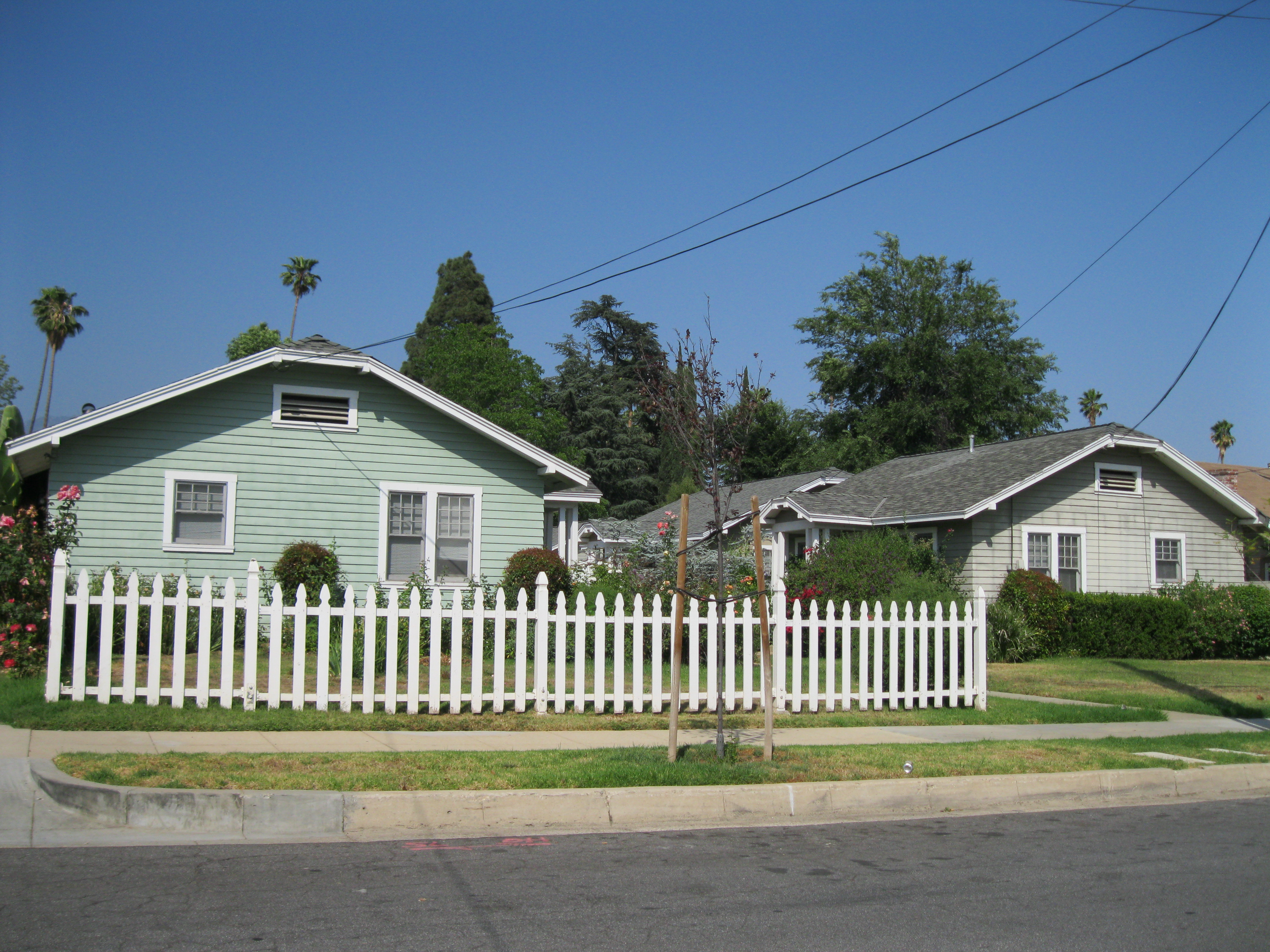

- Location within the Los Angeles metropolitan area Location within California Location within the United States
- Location: 830 Brooks Ave., Pasadena, California
- Coordinates: 34°9′35″N 118°9′19″W
- Area: less than one acre
- Built: 1922
- Built by: Hartman Brothers
- Architect: Tombleson, G. W.
- Architectural style: Colonial Revival
- MPS: Bungalow Courts of Pasadena TR
- NRHP reference No.: 94001322
- Added to NRHP: November 15, 1994

Kosy Knook Court is a bungalow court located at 830 Brooks Avenue in Pasadena, California. The court was constructed in 1922 and designed by G. W. Tombleson. The court includes five identical homes arranged around a central path; it originally included two garages as well, which have since been removed. The homes were designed in the Colonial Revival style and feature entrance porticos, windows with multiple panes, wood siding, and jerkinhead roofs.

The court was added to the National Register of Historic Places on November 15, 1994.
