= William à Court-Holmes, 2nd Baron Heytesbury =

British politician

The Right Honourable The Lord Heytesbury
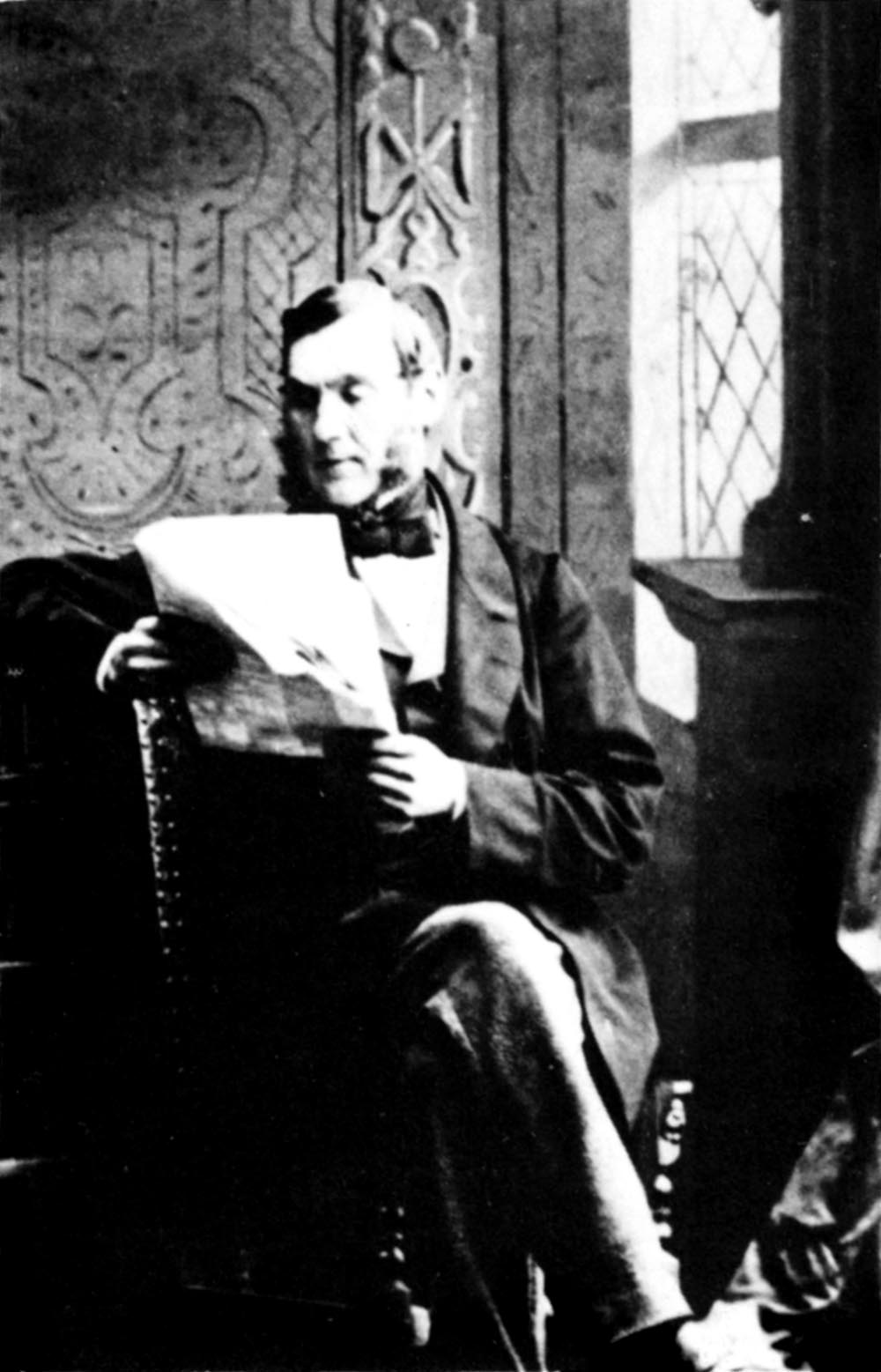
- The Rt. Hon. Lord Heytesbury, c. 1860

Member of Parliament for the Isle of Wight
- In office 1837–1847
- Preceded by: Sir Richard Simeon, Bt
- Succeeded by: John Simeon

Personal details
- Born: William Henry Ashe à Court; 11 July 1809 Heytesbury, Wiltshire
- Died: 21 April 1891 (aged 81) Heytesbury, Wiltshire
- Party: Conservative
- Spouse: Elizabeth Worsley-Holmes (m. 1833; died 1874)
- Children: 15
- Parent(s): William à Court, 1st Baron Heytesbury; Maria Rebecca Bouverie
- Education: Eton College
- Alma mater: St John's College, Cambridge

William Henry Ashe à Court-Holmes later Holmes-à Court, 2nd Baron Heytesbury (11 July 1809 – 21 April 1891) was a British peer and Conservative Member of Parliament.

== Career ==
Born William Henry Ashe à Court, Lord Heytesbury was the only son of William à Court, 1st Baron Heytesbury and Maria Rebecca Bouverie. In 1828 he went up to St John's College, Cambridge. He was elected to the House of Commons for the Isle of Wight in 1837, a seat he held until 1847. In 1860, he succeeded his father as second Baron Heytesbury and entered the House of Lords.

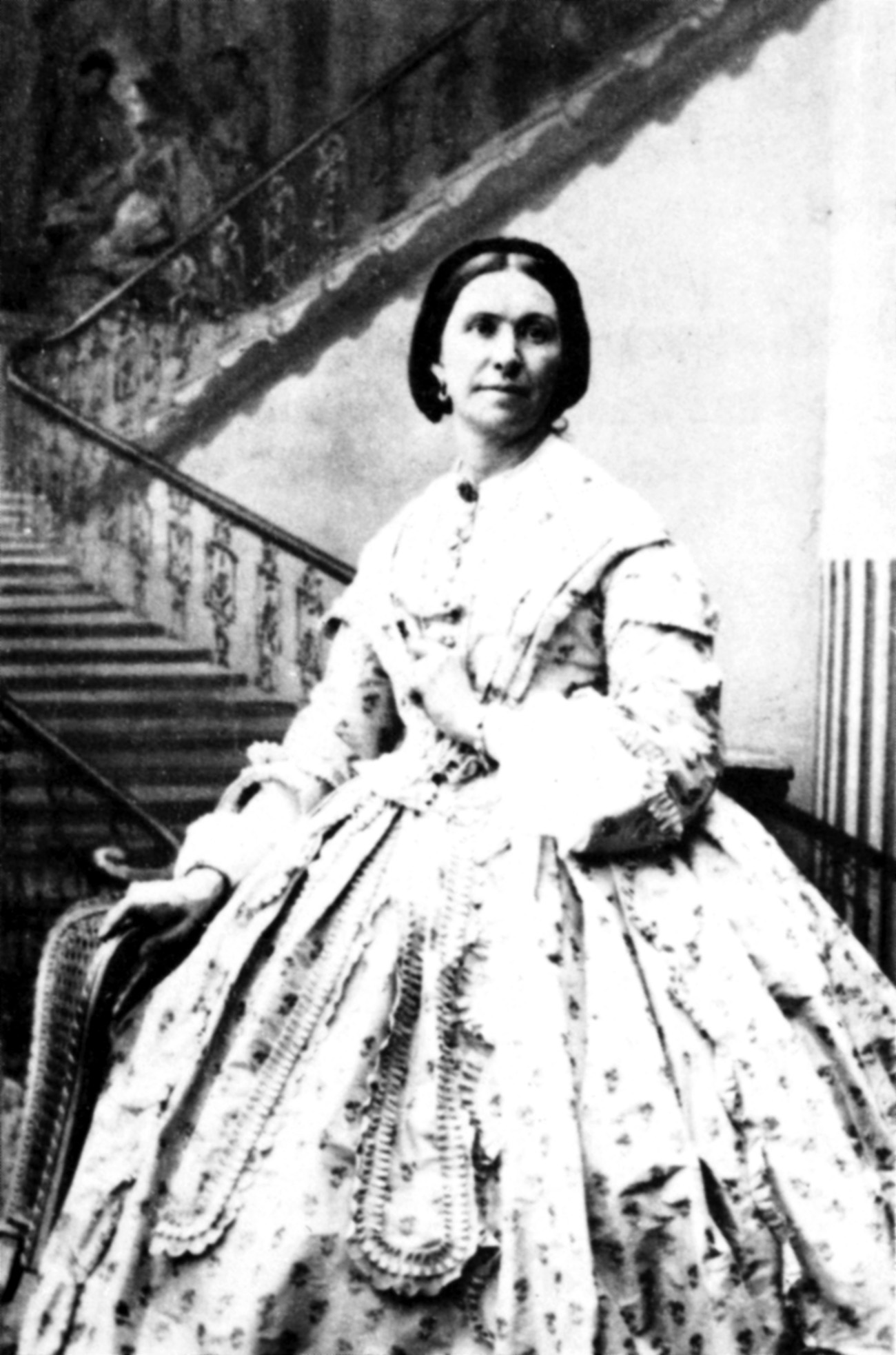
The Rt. Hon. Lady Heytesbury, c. 1860

== Family ==
Lord Heytesbury married Elizabeth Worsley-Holmes, daughter of Sir Leonard Worsley-Holmes, 9th Baronet, in 1833, and whom was the sole heiress of the 9th Baronet and its estates. He assumed by royal licence the additional surname of Holmes after that of Ashe à Court at the same time. In 1860, he changed the family name, by royal licence, from Ashe à Court-Holmes to Holmes à Court. They had ten sons and five daughters:

1. William Leonard Holmes à Court (1835-1885), married, Isabella Sophia Beadon, daughter of Reverend Richard Beadon and Isabella White, and had seven sons and two daughters. His eldest son William Frederick Holmes à Court, 3rd Baron Heytesbury succeeded his grandfather's barony.
2. Frederick Holmes à Court (1839-1917), was an officer in the British Army
3. Elizabeth Waud (née Holmes à Court) (1840-1902), married Edward Wilkes Waud and had three sons and five daughters.
4. Cpt Henry Holmes à Court (1841-1885), was a captain in the Royal Navy.
5. Emily O'Brien (née Holmes à Court) (1842-1868), married Edward Donough O'Brien, 14th Baron Inchiquin and had three sons and one daughter.
6. Charles George Holmes à Court (1843-1924), married firstly, Mary Anderson from 1874 to 1875, secondly, Mary West Howe from 1877 to 1889, thirdly, Martha Clowes from 1895 to 1899, and lastly Mary Rae Johnstone Jenkins from 1901 to 1944. His marriages resulted in four children.
7. Lt Col Edward Alexander Holmes à Court (1845-1923), served as Lieutenant-Colonel of the British Army. He married Adelaide Sophie, daughter of Hugh Hamersley (former husband of his sister) and his second wife Phillippa Mary Anne Phillips in 1880, they had one son and two daughters.
8. Gertrude Anne Hamersley (née Holmes à Court) (1847-1933), married Hugh Hamersley in 1882 but later divorced.
9. Arthur Wyndham Holmes à Court (1848-1915), married Annie Hardtman-Berkeley, daughter of Thomas Hardtman-Berkeley in 1873 and had four sons and one daughter.
10. Leonard Worsley Holmes à Court (1849-1899)
11. Walter Ashe Holmes à Court (1850-1930), married Annie Helmer
12. Herbert Holmes à Court (1851-1921), married Anna Frances Bray, daughter of James Bray, in 1879
13. Edith Maria Charlotte Holmes à Court (1853-1854)
14. Margaret Holmes à Court (1855-1933)
15. Alfred Holmes à Court (1856)

Lord Heytesbury died in April 1891, aged 81, and was succeeded by his grandson, William Frederick Holmes à Court, whose father William Leonard Holmes à Court had predeceased the 2nd Baron.

== Arms ==
Coat of arms of Holmes à Court, Baron Heytesbury
Crest 1st, Out of a naval crown or, an arm embowed in armour, the hand proper grasping a trident azure headed or; 2nd An eagle displayed sable charged on the body with two chevronels or and holding in the beak a lily slipped proper. Escutcheon Quarterly, 1st and 4th, Barry wavy of six or and azure, on a canton gules a lion of England (Holmes); 2nd and 3rd Per fess or and paly of six erminois and azure, in chief an eagle displayed sable, beaked and membered gules, charged on the body with two chevronels argent (à Court). Supporters Two eagles, wings elevated and displayed sable, beaked and membered gules, each holding in the beak a lily slipped proper. Motto Grandescunt aucta labore (Increased by labour, they grow large)

Parliament of the United Kingdom
Preceded by Sir Richard Godin Simeon	Member of Parliament for Isle of Wight; 1837–1847	Succeeded by John Simeon
Peerage of the United Kingdom
Preceded by William à Court	Baron Heytesbury; 1860–1891	Succeeded by William Frederick Holmes à Court
