= Knook =

Village in Wiltshire, England

Coordinates: 51.176°N 2.090°W

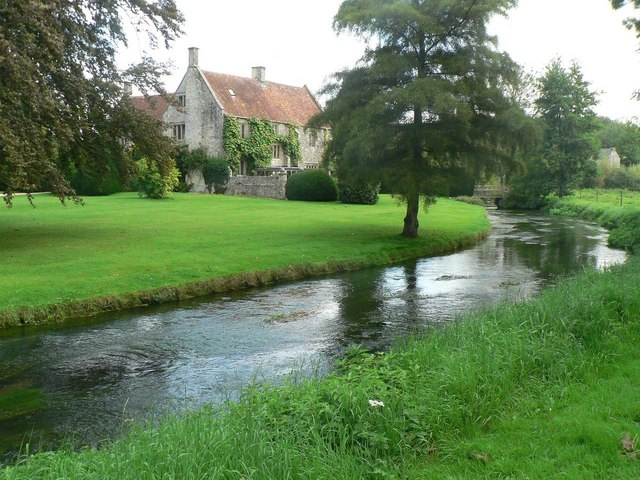
- River Wylye and Knook Manor

- Location within Wiltshire
- Population: 77 (in 2011)
- OS grid reference: ST938419
- Civil parish: Knook
- Unitary authority: Wiltshire
- Ceremonial county: Wiltshire
- Region: South West
- Country: England
- Sovereign state: United Kingdom
- Post town: Warminster
- Postcode district: BA12
- Dialling code: 01985
- Police: Wiltshire
- Fire: Dorset and Wiltshire
- Ambulance: South Western
- UK Parliament: South West Wiltshire
- Website: Parish Council

Knook is a small village and civil parish in Wiltshire, England. The village lies to the north of the River Wylye at the edge of Salisbury Plain, about 4 1/2 miles (7 km) southeast of Warminster, close to the A36 road to Salisbury.

== History ==
The Iron Age hillfort known as Knook Castle is in the adjacent parish of Upton Lovell.

The Domesday Book of 1086 records the manor of Knook as Cunuche, with 19 households. The entry mentions a woman of the manor called Leofgyth "who made gold embroideries for the king and queen and still does so".

Much of the present manor house was built in 1637. It is Grade I listed.

An army camp was established in 1914 to the north of the village, on the other side of the main road near the junction with the Chitterne road. The site is now part of the Salisbury Plain Training Area and continues in use as Knook Camp, providing temporary accommodation in many small buildings and extending north into Heytesbury parish.

== Imperial Gazetteer entry ==
John Marius Wilson's Imperial Gazetteer of England and Wales (1870–1872) described Knook as follows:

KNOOK, a parish, with a village, in Warminster district, Wilts; on the river Wiley, the Old Ditch way, and the Somerset and Weymouth railway, 1 mile SE of Heytesbury r. station. Post town, Heytesbury, under Bath. Acres, 1,440. Real property, £1,342. Pop., 208. Houses, 46. The property belongs chiefly to Lord Heytesbury. Knook Castle is an ancient single ditched entrenchment, of about 2 acres; is supposed to have been originally a British village, and afterwards a Roman summer camp; and has yielded Roman coins. Traces of another ancient British village are to the N. "The site of these villages," says Sir R.Hoare, "is decidedly marked by great cavities and a black soil; and the attentive eye may easily trace out the lines of houses and the streets, or rather the hollow ways, conducting to them. Numerous tumuli and barrows are in the neighbourhood." The living is a p. curacy, annexed to the p. curacy of Heytesbury, in the diocese of Salisbury. The church, in Aug., 1866 was about to be repaired.

== Parish church ==
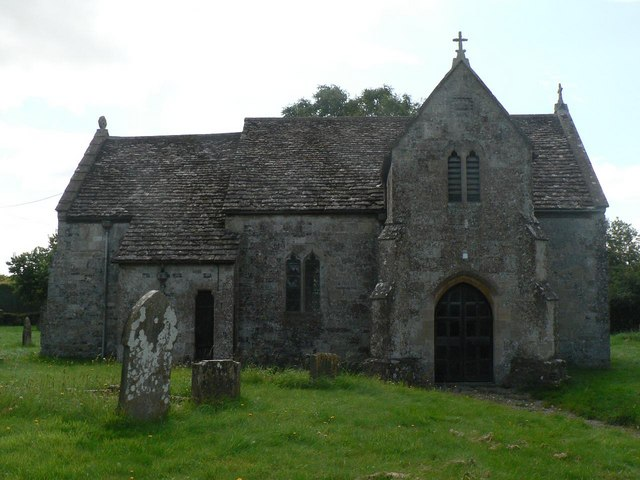
Church of St Margaret

The oldest parts of the Church of England parish church of St Margaret are early Norman, from the late 11th century. They include decorative carved stonework, which is notable in the tympanum to an arched doorway. St Margret's was a dependent chapelry of the collegiate church of SS. Peter and Paul, Heytesbury. A monumental inscription at St Margaret's dating from 1592 asks "Of your cheriti praye for ye soule of Iohn Morgan Gentleman and Elinor his wife with all thaire progenitors and all Christians amen".

The church was restored by William Butterfield in 1874–6, and was designated as Grade I listed in 1968. Parish registers survive from 1687 and are kept at the Wiltshire and Swindon History Centre. The benefice was united with Heytesbury-with-Tytherington in 1885, and today the church is served by the Upper Wylye Valley team.

== Local government ==
Knook, together with the parish of Heytesbury, elects a parish council called Heytesbury, Imber and Knook. Local government services are provided by Wiltshire Council.

== Sources ==
- Fletcher, Banister (1975). Sir Banister Fletcher's A History of Architecture. p. 557.
- Marshall, Peter. Beliefs and the Dead in Reformation England. p. 177.
- Pevsner, Nikolaus; Cherry, Bridget (revision) (1975) [1963]. Wiltshire. The Buildings of England (2nd ed.). Harmondsworth: Penguin Books. pp. 282–283. ISBN 0-14-071026-4.
- Pugh, R.B.; Crittall, Elizabeth, eds. (1956). "The Collegiate Church of St. Peter and St. Paul, Heytesbury". A History of the County of Wiltshire. Victoria County History. Vol. 3. pp. 389–392.
- Wood, Michael (1986). Domesday: a Search for the Roots of England. London: BBC Publications. p. 10.
