= Heytesbury =

Village in Wiltshire, England

Coordinates: 51.183°N 2.109°W

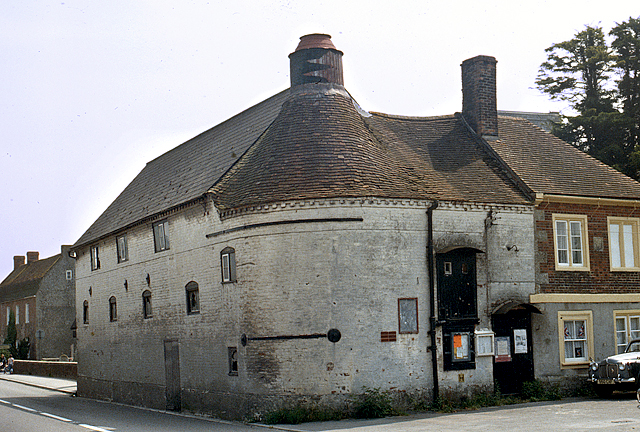
- A late 18th-century former maltings

- Location within Wiltshire
- Interactive map showing the parish boundary
- Population: 722 (2021 census)
- OS grid reference: ST925426
- Civil parish: Heytesbury
- Unitary authority: Wiltshire
- Ceremonial county: Wiltshire
- Region: South West
- Country: England
- Sovereign state: United Kingdom
- Post town: Warminster
- Postcode district: BA12
- Dialling code: 01985
- Police: Wiltshire
- Fire: Dorset and Wiltshire
- Ambulance: South Western
- UK Parliament: South West Wiltshire
- Website: heytesburyparish.co.uk

Heytesbury is a village (Note: It was formerly considered to be a town.) and a civil parish in Wiltshire, England. It lies on the north bank of the Wylye, about 3 1/2 miles (5.6 km) south-east of the town of Warminster. The civil parish includes most of the small neighbouring settlement of Tytherington and the deserted village of Imber.

== History ==
Chalk downland north of Heytesbury village has prehistoric earthworks, including long barrows and round barrows. Strip lynchets are visible north and east of Cotley Hill.

The parish lies between the Iron Age hillforts of Scratchbury Camp and Knook Castle. A Romano-British settlement has been identified on Tytherington Hill, in the far south of the parish. Chapperton Down, west of Imber, has evidence of settlement and field systems from the same period and earlier.

The Domesday Book of 1086 recorded a small settlement of eight households at Hestrebe, with a church. The hundred of Heytesbury, south and east of Warminster, comprised seventeen places.

The Hungerford family held land at Heytesbury by the 1390s and reared sheep in the surrounding area in the next century. Family members included Walter Hungerford, 1st Baron Hungerford of Heytesbury.

John Marius Wilson's Imperial Gazetteer of England and Wales (1870–1872) described Heytesbury as follows:

HEYTESBURY, a small town, a parish, a sub-district and a hundred, in Wilts. The town stands on the river Wylye, and on the Somerset and Weymouth railway, near Salisbury Plain, 4 miles SE by E of Warminster; was known, to the Saxons, as Hegtredesbiryg; took afterwards the names of Haresbury, Haseberie, and Heightsbury; is now commonly called Hatchbury; was, in the time of Stephen, the residence of the Empress Maud; was, in 1766, nearly all destroyed by fire, and afterwards rebuilt; consists now chiefly of a single street; possesses interest to tourists as the central point of a region abounding in British, Roman, Saxon and Danish remains; and gives the title of Baron to the family of A'Court. It sent two members to parliament from the time of Henry VI till disfranchised by the act of 1832; was a borough by prescription; and is now a seat of courts leet.

It has a post office under Bath, a railway station, two chief inns, a church, an Independent chapel, a national school and an endowed hospital. The church dates from the 12th century; was partly rebuilt in 1470; underwent a thorough restoration in 1866, at an expense of about £5,500; is cruciform; has a massive tower; and contains the burial place of the A'Courts, and a tablet to Cunningham, the antiquary. (Note: William Cunnington FSA (1754–1810) of Heytesbury was intended(sic).) The hospital was founded in 1470, by Lady Hungerford, for a chaplain, twelve poor men, and one poor woman; was rebuilt in 1769; forms three sides of a square, two stories high; and has an endowed income of £1,373. A weekly market was formerly held; and two fairs are still held on 14 May and 25 Sept. – The parish comprises 3,380 acres. Real property, £4,713. Pop., in 1841, 1,311; in 1861, 1,103. Houses, 237.

The manor belonged to the Burghershs; and passed to the Badlesmeres, the Hungerfords, the Hastingses, and others. Heytesbury House, the seat of Lord Heytesbury, is on the N side of the town; was partially rebuilt about 1784; contains a fine collection of pictures: and stands in a well wooded park. Cotley Hill rises from the woods of the park; commands a very fine panoramic view; is crowned by a tumulus; and was anciently fortified. Knook castle, Scratchbury camp, Golden barrow, and many other antiquities are in the neighbourhood. The living is a vicarage, united with the vicarage of Knook, in the diocese of Salisbury. Value, £350. Patron, the Bishop of Salisbury. The sub-district contains also eleven other parishes, and is in Warminster district. Acres, 27,546. Pop., 4,372. Houses, 946. The hundred contains thirteen parishes, and part of another. Acres, 33,040. Pop., 5,572. Houses, 1,209.

Between 1449 and 1832, Heytesbury was a parliamentary borough, returning two members of Parliament (MPs). This Borough of Heytesbury was a burgage borough, meaning that the right to vote was reserved to the householders of specific properties or "burgage tenements" within the borough; there were just twenty-six of these tenements by the time of the Reform Act 1832, and all had been owned by the heads of the A'Court family as an inheritance since the 17th century, giving them complete control of the choice of the two MPs. The Reform Act 1832 swept away all these rotten and pocket boroughs and greatly increased the enfranchised population.

An elementary school was provided in 1838, immediately south-west of the church. By 1858, there were 50–60 pupils and 40–50 infants. The school moved to a new site in 1900, off the High Street west of the church, and came under Wiltshire County Council control in the early years of that century. Children of all ages attended until 1931, when those over 11 transferred to the new Avenue Senior School at Warminster. The school continues to serve the locality as Heytesbury CofE Primary School.

== Governance ==
A parish council known as Heytesbury, Imber and Knook covers this parish and the neighbouring parish of Knook. Local government services are provided by Wiltshire Council, which has its offices in nearby Trowbridge. Historically, the parish was in Warminster Rural District from 1894 until 1934, then Warminster and Westbury Rural District until 1974, and finally West Wiltshire district until 2009, when Wiltshire became a unitary authority.

The area is represented currently by the South West Wiltshire parliamentary constituency. The village had its own eponymous Heytesbury constituency between 1449 and 1832.

== Demographics ==
At the 2021 census, the civil parish had a population of 722 people in 327 households.

Census population of Heytesbury parish
Census	Population	Female	Male	Households	Source
2001	760	393	367	304	
2011	773	408	365	349	
2021	722	383	339	327	

== Transport ==
The A36 road bypasses the village to the north; an Ordnance Survey map of 1958 shows the road's earlier route along the High Street.

Beeline Coaches operates two bus routes, which connect the village with Devizes, Frome and Warminster.

The Wessex Main Line railway, which opened here in 1856, runs to the south of the village. Until 1955, Heytesbury railway station was operational; it was sited on the road to Tytherington.

== Religious sites ==
=== Church of England ===
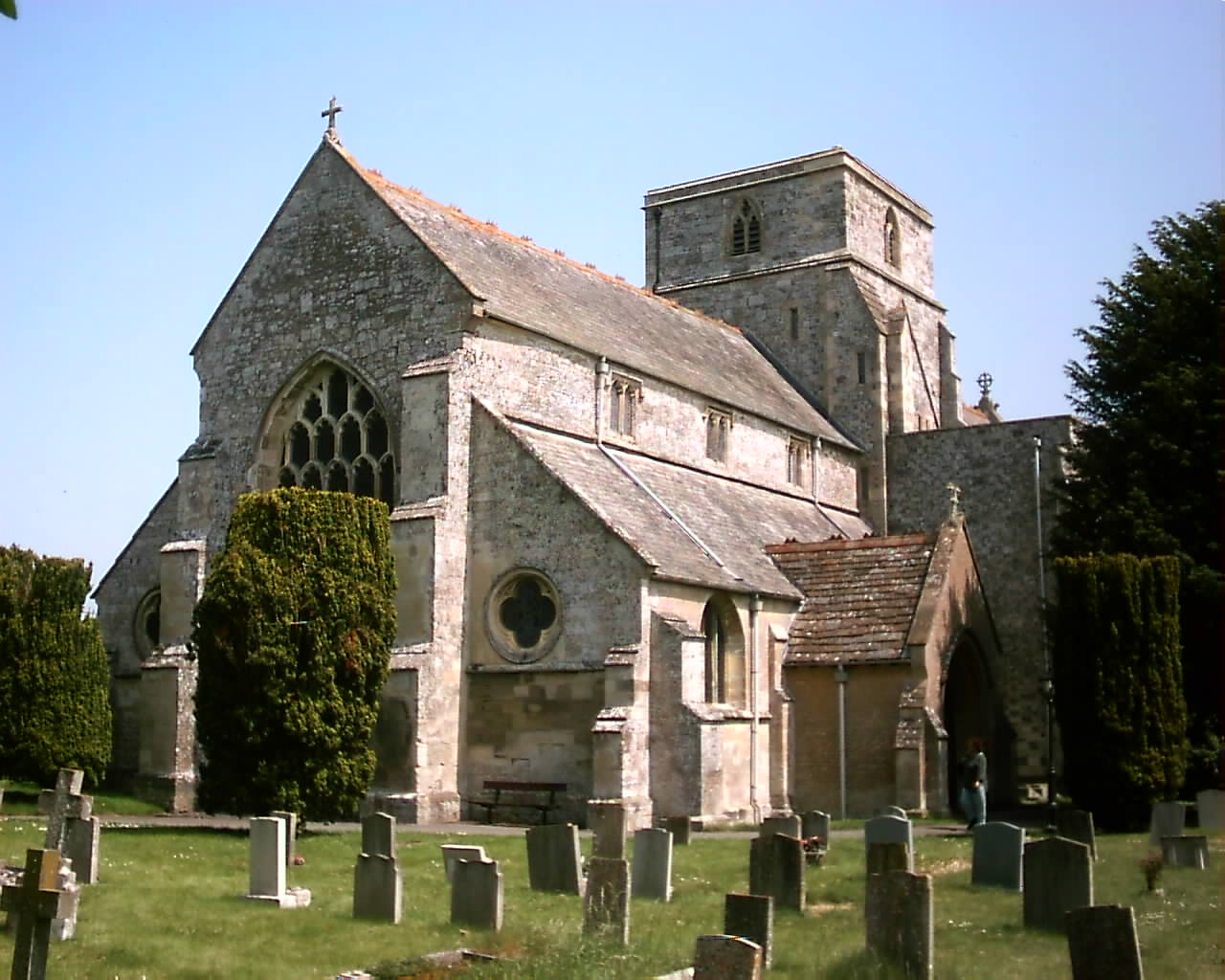
Church of St Peter and St Paul

A church was mentioned at Hestrebe in the Domesday Book of 1086, which became a collegiate church in the 12th century. The present parish church is from the 13th century and is a grade I listed building.

At Tytherington, a chapel was founded in the 12th century. The small church of St James is mainly from the 16th and is grade II* listed.

St Giles' Church, Imber, dates from the late 13th century and is a grade I listed building. It is now a redundant church in the care of the Churches Conservation Trust.

=== Non-conformist ===
A Congregational chapel was built in Heytesbury in 1812 and was replaced in c.1868. The chapel closed sometime after 1955.

There was a Primitive Methodist chapel at Tytherington.

== Notable buildings ==
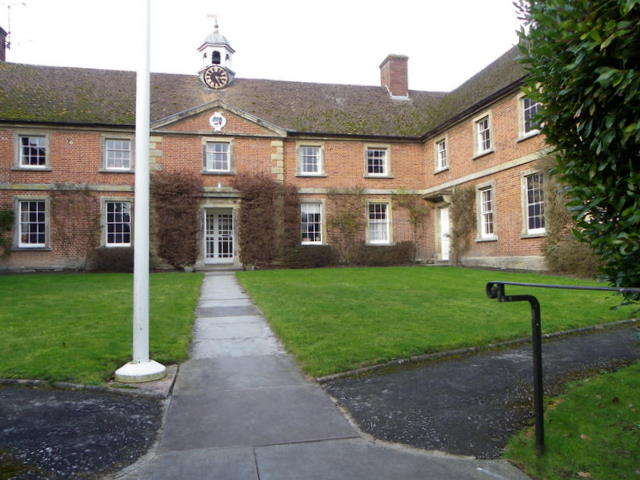
Hospital of St John and St Katherine

The Hospital of St John and St Katherine was founded in 1442 by Walter Hungerford, 1st Baron Hungerford and re-endowed in 1472 by Margaret, widow of his son Robert. The almshouse provided housing for twelve poor unmarried men and one woman, who was responsible for domestic duties, under the oversight of a chaplain or warden appointed by the Chancellor of Salisbury Cathedral. There was a school house and, from time to time, a schoolmaster. In around 1769, the hospital burned down and a new building was erected, of two storeys around three sides of a courtyard. The architect was Esau Reynolds (1725–1779) of Trowbridge. In 1968, the building was designated as grade II listed. The hospital continues as a registered charity.

Heytesbury House, a country house rebuilt in 1782, is grade II* listed. In 1985, the southern part of the park surrounding the house was the subject of a compulsory purchase order to allow construction of the A36 bypass, separating the house from its cricket field and requiring a new entrance to be made from the west. The gate piers and curved flanking walls at the former southern entrance, from the early 19th century, are still standing. In the early 21st century, the house and stables were converted into several residences.

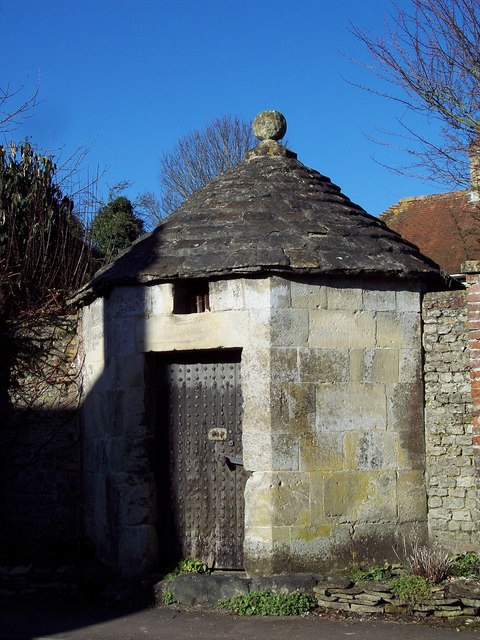
Heytesbury lock-up

On the High Street is a small octagonal village lock-up or blind house, probably dating from the 18th century.

== Notable people ==
Elizabeth Woodville (1437–1492), wife of Edward IV, mother of Elizabeth of York and the Princes in the Tower, was housed at the East Manor, with Elizabeth of York and her four sisters, following the sudden illness and subsequent death of Edward IV.

The antiquary William Cunnington (1754–1810) was of Heytesbury, and investigated many prehistoric sites on the downs.

Heytesbury House was built for the Ashe à Court family. Sir William à Court was created a Baronet in 1795 and the Baronry of Heytesbury was created in 1828 for his son, also Sir William.

The poet Siegfried Sassoon spent the latter part of his life at Heytesbury House, which he purchased in 1933. His son George Sassoon grew up there and inherited the house on his father's death in 1967; he lived there until 1994, when it was sold.

Major-General Glyn Gilbert (1920–2003) settled at Heytesbury.
