= Army Officer Selection Board =

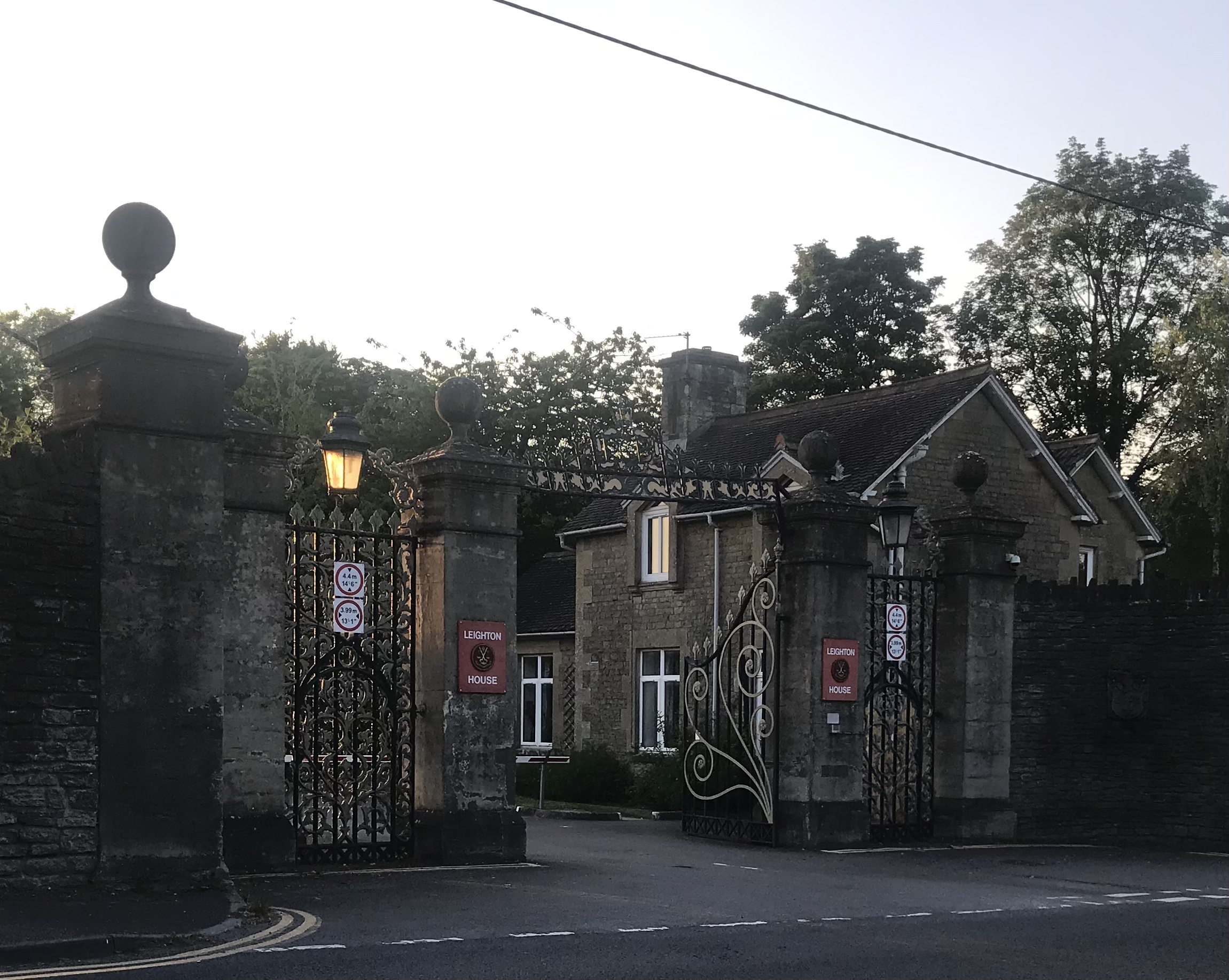
- Main entrance
- Country: United Kingdom
- Branch: British Army
- Part of: Directorate of Army Recruiting
- Garrison/HQ: Leighton House, Westbury

Commanders
- President: Colonel Mark Gidlow-Jackson

Insignia
- Badge

Army Officer Selection Board (AOSB) is an assessment centre used by the British Army as part of the officer selection process for the regular army and Army Reserve and related scholarship schemes. The board is based at Leighton House, Westbury in Wiltshire, England in a dedicated camp. It is commanded by the President AOSB, a colonel in the British Army, supported by a number of vice-presidents.

AOSB is an equivalent of the Navy's Admiralty Interview Board and the Officer and Aircrew Selection Centre of the Royal Air Force.

== History ==
The AOSB has its roots in the War Office Selection Boards (WOSBs), created by Army psychiatrists in 1942 during World War II. They involved candidates taking a three-day stay in a country house, where tests were administered including written tests of mental ability, questionnaires, leaderless group tests and interviews. Psychiatrists and some psychological components of the WOSBs were removed from the Boards after the war. The Army Officer Selection Board was known as the Regular Commissions Board (RCB). In 1949, the RCB moved from Sussex to its current facilities at Leighton House in Westbury, Wiltshire. By 2009, both Regular and Army Reserve officers were screened here.

== Application process ==
Applicants for the British Army undergo initial suitability assessments, through computer-based tests and interviews, along a number of routes. All officer candidates will be required to attend AOSB at a point determined by the type of entry. Candidates for scholarship and professionally qualified officers will attend only one board; other entrants will be required to attend both a briefing board and a main board.

Candidates will usually have undertaken insight or familiarisation visits to appropriate units prior to attendance at the board.

== Board structure ==
Candidates are divided into groups of six to eight, each supervised by a group leader who is a major or captain and who runs the activities and records evidence.

A board consists of one or two groups and is presided over by a president or vice-president, with Professionally Qualified Officer boards supervised by an officer of the appropriate specialisation. Each group is assessed by a deputy president, who is a lieutenant colonel; their group leader; and an education advisor, who is a serving or retired officer of the AGC (ETS).

Up to three boards can be run concurrently.

== Types of board ==
=== AOSB briefing ===
This takes place over two days and must be attended prior to being able to proceed to the main board. It is an opportunity for candidates to learn some of the techniques that will be tested at the main board, and for the AOSB assessors to offer advice and guidance to those attending about how prepared they are to attempt the much more challenging main board. It is designed to give potential officers an idea of what is required and expected at the main board. Candidates will participate in a number of assessments, including physical and intellectual ones. The results will be used by AOSB assessors when feeding back to candidates.

After attending AOSB briefing, candidates will be assigned a category based on the evidence available to the assessors. This will be:

1. Allowed to proceed to the main board as soon as desired.
2. Required to delay for between 3 and 24 months (often awarded to younger candidates with potential ability but insufficient maturity, or for remedial purposes such as to improve upon physical fitness)
3. The candidate is thought unlikely to pass the Main Board based on the evidence presented at briefing. However, they are not prevented from attempting the Main Board if, after further consideration, they believe they can achieve the required standard.
4. The candidate is not considered suitable for commissioned service based on the evidence available. This may be as a result of a number of issues, including their personality or their ability to apply their intellect. Candidates who receive a Category 4 at the briefing may appeal against this result if they believe that their performance was not representative. If successful (strong cases must be made) the candidate may be allowed to attend a Main Board.

=== AOSB main board ===
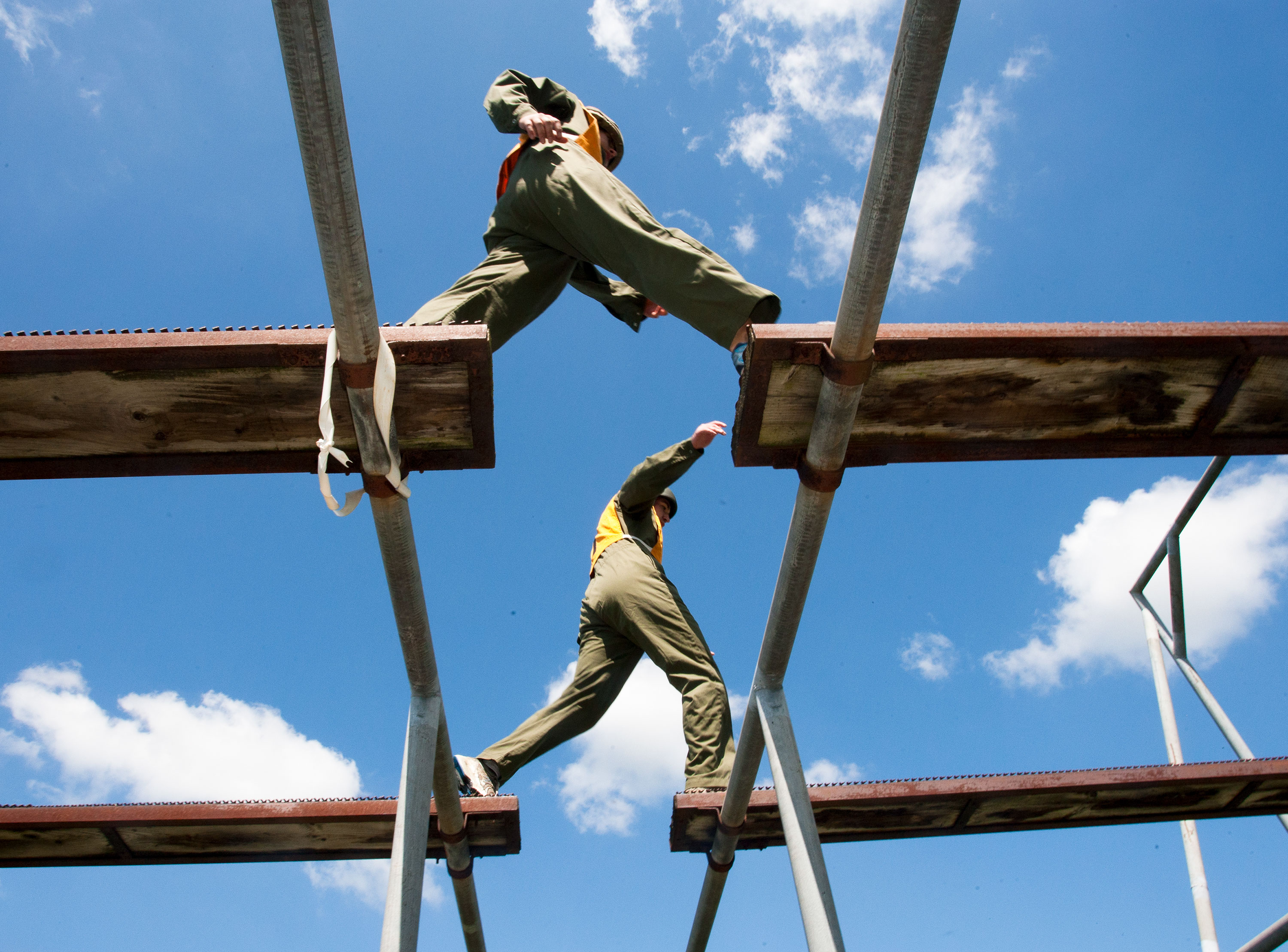
Officer Cadets of the UOTC undertaking an obstacle course in preparation for an AOSB

This is a four-day selection event that consists of a number of different but inter-linked intellectual, physical, mental and aptitude tests. It is designed to put candidates for both the Regular Army and Army Reserve under pressure whilst fostering their team spirit and competitiveness.

The Boards normally run from Tuesday until Friday but a small number each year take place from Thursday until Sunday.

On arrival, candidates are allocated a number (used instead of their name) and placed into groups. As candidates are assessed against a standard and not against each other's performance, strong groups may see a large proportion of their members meet the standard.

On the last night of the course a formal dinner is held for the candidates. The staff are at pains to point out that the meal is not an assessment, and no directing staff are present at the event.

The details of the physical tasks, command tasks, interviews and academic tests are not made public. It is known that the assessment consists of a physical fitness assessment, an individual obstacle course, two multiple-choice tests on current affairs and general knowledge (in the past a third test covered military knowledge), three interviews, a group discussion and essay on current and moral affairs, a 5-minute lecture, individual planning exercise, and both leaderless team tasks and a series of command tasks where a team member commands the rest. There are also group races where each group gets an opportunity to test themselves against the other groups undergoing selection at the time.

Candidates are only permitted to make two attempts to pass the board, which must be separated by a minimum of eight months.

=== Chaplains ===
Selection for Army chaplains – including regular, reserve, and cadet force roles – takes place at the AOSB.

=== CFCB (Cadet Forces) Board ===
The Cadet Forces Commissions Board is used to select officers for the Army Cadet Force. Run over a weekend, the course is broadly similar to the AOSB Main Board, without physical tests. There is no set quota for selection and candidates are assessed against a standard, not each other.

Following completion of CFCB, a candidate is awarded one of four possible results:

1. Selected – The candidate has been successful at the board and is recommended for an Army Cadet Force commission.
2. Not Selected (Encourage) – The candidate has not been successful, however it has been recognised that they have potential and are encouraged to attempt the board again at a later date.
3. Not Selected – The candidate has not been successful. If they wish, they can attempt the board again at a later date.
4. Not Selected (Discourage) – The candidate has not been successful and is deemed to be unsuitable for a commission. The candidate cannot normally attend for another attempt, however in extenuating circumstances their county commandant can appeal to the President CFCB for an exception to be made.

If a candidate has not been successful at the board, they must wait at least a year before a second attempt. If the second attempt is unsuccessful, they must wait a minimum of five years for a third attempt.

=== Army Scholarship Board ===
The Army runs two Scholarship Boards each year for boys and girls aged between 16 and 17. The board is similar in many ways to the Main Board, with a fitness test, interviews, planning exercise and leadership tasks. The process takes 24 hours, and is tailored to suit candidates in this age range. The Board is designed to identify intelligence and leadership at a young age. Successful candidates are then subject to further scrutiny by Recruiting Group prior to potentially receiving a financial award whilst at sixth form, and then a subsequent annual award for each year whilst studying at university. They are also awarded a final lump sum on completion of the 44-week Commissioning Course after university. By passing the Board, scholars have a guaranteed place at Royal Military Academy Sandhurst, and they do not need to pass the AOSB Main Board to enter that establishment.

== Physical fitness requirements ==
Following the roll-out of new standardised fitness tests across the entire army in April 2019, the general fitness requirements for both regular and reserve officer entrants consists of the Role Fitness Test (Entry):

- Reach 8.7 on a bleep test
- Throw a 4 kg medicine ball 3.1 metres from a seated position
- Lift 76 kg in a mid-thigh pull

Standards are the same for male and female candidates.

== Presidents ==
- Major General V. H. B. Majendie, CB, DSO, 1943–1946
- Major General Hubert Essame, CBE, DSO, MC, 1946–1948
- Major General C. E. N. Lomax, CB, CBE, DSO, 1948–1949
- Major General F. R. G. Matthews, CB, DSO, 1949–1950
- Major-General F. W. Festing, GCB, KBE, DSO, DL, 1950–1951
- Major General G. W. E. Heath, 1951–1954
- Major General B. A. Coad, CB, CBE, DSO, 1954–1956
- Major General G. E. Prior-Palmer, CB, DSO, 1956–1957
- Major General R. C. Cottrell-Hill, CB, CBE, DSO, MC, 1957–1959
- Lt General Sir W. F. R. Turner, KBE, CB, DSO, 1959–1961
- Major General R. G. S. Hobbs, CB, DSO, OBE, 1961–1962
- Major General N. L. Foster, CB, DSO, 1962–1965
- Major General Sir J. A. d'Avigdor-Goldsmid, Bart, CB, OBE, MC, Feb. 1965 – Sept. 1965
- Major General R. E. T. St John, CB, MC, 1965–1967
- Major General C. M. M. Man, CB, OBE, MC, 1967–1969
- Major General D. L. Lloyd Owen, CB, DSO, OBE, MC, 1969–1972
- Major General D. A. D. J. Bethell, 1972–1975
- Major General A. G. C. Jones, CB, MC, 1975–1978
- Major General D. Houston, 1980–1983
- Major General P. M. Welsh, O.B.E., M.C., 1983–1985
- Major General R. Benbow, CB, 1985–1987
- Brigadier J. E. Killick, 1987–1988
- Brigadier M. R. Lee, 1988–1989
- Brigadier A. B. S. H. Gooch, 1989–1992
- Brigadier C. T. J. Wright, 1992–1993
- Brigadier R. V. Searby, 1993–1996
- Brigadier S. H. R. H. Monro, 1996–1998
- Brigadier D. A. K. Biggart, 1998–2000
- Brigadier J. P. Hoskinson, 2000–2002
- Brigadier S. R. B. Allen, 2002–2005
- Brigadier R. P. D. Folkes, 2005–2007
- Brigadier P. J. Mostyn, 2007–2010
- Brigadier Simon Caraffi, 2010–2012
- Colonel L. M. Giles, CBE, 2019–2022
- Colonel Iain Moodie, 2022–2025
- Colonel Mark Gidlow-Jackson, 2025–2026

== Leighton House ==
Leighton House
- Located Near Westbury, Wiltshire, England, United Kingdom

Site information
- Type: Manor
- Owner: British Army
- Controlled by: British Army

Location
- Coordinates: 51.252501°N 2.192197°W

Site history
- Built: 1800
- Built by: Thomas Henry Hele Phipps

Garrison information
- Occupants: Army Officer Selection Board

The estate on which Leighton House stands belonged to the Phipps family, a prominent family of Westbury clothiers, later landed gentry, who first leased a house there in the early 18th century and bought the property from the Earl of Abingdon in 1791. In 1800 Thomas Henry Hele Phipps, father of coffee merchants and politicians John Lewis and Charles Paul Phipps, built a new neoclassical box house, naming it Leighton House.

William Laverton (died 1925), who owned a cloth mill inherited from his uncle Abraham Laverton, bought out the entire estate in 1888. He employed Bristol architect Sir Frank Wills to alter and extend the house, and planted trees, including a row of Araucaria araucana (Chilean pine) which still stands there today. Laverton ran his own in-house cricket team which played at W. H. Laverton's Ground, across the road from the house (now part of Wiltshire Council's Leighton Recreation Centre).

The estate and its farmland were sold by Laverton in 1921. The house was briefly used by a prep school called Victoria College, before the War Office bought the estate in 1939. It previously housed a selection board for National Service officers. Since 1949, the Regular Commissions Board, later the Army Officer Selection Board, has been based there.

The 40 acres (16 ha) estate comprises a 19th-century manor house (Leighton House itself), a trout lake fed by a chalk stream, and an assault course where potential officers are put through their paces.

In 1978 Leighton House was designated as Grade II listed for its architectural significance, noting features from two periods.

== Future ==
In March 2016, the Ministry of Defence announced that the Westbury site was one of ten to be sold in order to reduce the size of the Defence estate. In November 2016 the estimated date of disposal of the site was given as 2024, with the Selection Board due to move to Royal Military Academy Sandhurst, Berkshire. In 2021, this decision was reversed under the Future Soldier reforms and the board will remain in place.
