= 1906 Westbury by-election =

UK Parliamentary by-election

The 1906 Westbury by-election was a parliamentary by-election held for the UK House of Commons constituency of Westbury in Wiltshire on 26 February 1906.

== Vacancy ==
The by-election was caused by the resignation of the sitting Liberal MP, John Fuller. Fuller had been appointed a Lord Commissioner of the Treasury, one of the formal titles held by government Whips, and under the Parliamentary rules of the day had to resign and fight a by-election.

== Candidates ==
Fuller had been MP for Westbury since the general election of 1900 and had held the seat with a majority of 1,476 votes or 16.4% of the poll at the 1906 election just a month earlier. In all the circumstances, the Conservatives declined to stand a candidate against him.

== Result ==
There being no other candidates putting themselves forward Fuller was returned unopposed. He held his seat until 1911 when he resigned to take up appointment as Governor of Victoria in Australia.

Westbury by-election, 1906
Party	Candidate	Votes	%	±%
Liberal	John Fuller	Unopposed	N/A	N/A
Liberal hold				

== See also ==
- List of United Kingdom by-elections
- United Kingdom by-election records
- 1911 Westbury by-election
