= Charles Phipps =

Charles Phipps may refer to:

- Charles Phipps (Royal Navy officer) (1753–1786), British naval officer and member of parliament
- Charles Beaumont Phipps (1801–1866), British soldier and courtier
- C. J. Phipps (Charles John Phipps, 1835–1897), English architect
- Charles N. P. Phipps (1845–1913), English landowner and Conservative member of parliament
- Charles Paul Phipps (1815–1880), English merchant and Conservative member of parliament
