= Phipps (surname) =

Phipps is a surname derived from the given name Philip.

== Notable families ==
- Phipps family, a family of American entrepreneurs and philanthropists:
  - Henry Phipps, Jr. (1839–1930)
  - John Shaffer Phipps (1874–1958)
  - Gladys Mills Phipps (1883–1970)
  - Lillian Bostwick Phipps (1906–1987)
  - Ogden Phipps (1908–2002)
  - Ogden Mills Phipps (1940–2016)
- A family of British aristocrats, landowners and diplomats:
  - Constantine Phipps, 1st Marquess of Normanby (1797–1863), Lord Lieutenant of Ireland
  - George Phipps, 2nd Marquess of Normanby (1819–1890), soldier and politician
  - Henry Phipps, 1st Earl of Mulgrave (1755–1831), Foreign Secretary
  - Constantine Phipps, 1st Baron Mulgrave (1722–1775), Irish peer
  - Constantine Phipps, 2nd Baron Mulgrave (1744–1792), explorer
  - Charles Phipps (1753–1786), naval officer
  - Ramsay Weston Phipps (1838–1923) Royal Artillery, military historian
  - Sir Constantine Phipps (1840–1911), diplomat
  - Sir Eric Phipps (1875–1945), diplomat
- A family of British brewers, businessmen and politicians from Towcester and Northampton:
  - Pickering Phipps I (1772–1830), founder of Phipps brewery in 1801, mayor of Northampton 1821
  - John Phipps (1798–1875), mayor of Northampton 1831
  - John Phipps 2 (1823–1883), mayor of Northampton
  - Pickering Phipps II (1827–1890), mayor of Northampton, J.P., MP
  - Pickering Phipps III (1861–1937), businessman, High Sheriff of Northamptonshire
- An English family with origins as clothiers (and, later, land-owners) from Westbury, Wiltshire:
  - Thomas Phipps (c. 1648–1715), merchant and briefly member of Parliament
  - William Phipps (c. 1681–1748), Governor of Bombay
  - James Phipps (c. 1687–1723), Captain-General of the Royal African Company and Governor of Cape Coast Castle
  - John Lewis Phipps (1801–1870), coffee merchant and briefly member of Parliament
  - Charles Paul Phipps (1815–1880), coffee merchant and member of Parliament
  - Charles Nicholas Paul Phipps (1845–1913), coffee merchant and member of Parliament
  - Joyce Grenfell (née Phipps) (1910–1979), writer and actor
  - Simon Wilton Phipps (1921–2001), Bishop of Lincoln
  - Jack Phipps CBE (1925–2010), arts administrator
  - Martin Phipps (born 1968), composer

== Notable people ==
- Bill Phipps (1942–2022), also known as Reverend William Phipps, Canadian church leader and social justice activist
- Cecil Phipps (1896–1968), English footballer
- Charles Phipps (Royal Navy officer) (1753–1786), British naval officer and Member of Parliament
- Charles Beaumont Phipps (1801–1866), British soldier and courtier
- Charles J. Phipps (1835–1897), English architect
- Charles Nicholas Paul Phipps (1845–1913), English landowner and Conservative Member of Parliament
- Charles Paul Phipps (1815–1880), English merchant and Conservative Member of Parliament
- Ernest Phipps (1900–1963), American singer and Pentecostal preacher
- Grace Phipps (born 1992), American actress
- Jennifer Phipps (1932–2019), Canadian actress
- Jill Phipps (1964–1995), English animal rights activist
- Lawrence C. Phipps (1862–1958), United States Senator from Colorado
- McKinley Phipps, Jr. (born 1977), American rapper better known as Mac
- Mike Phipps (born 1947), professional football quarterback
- Marilène Phipps (born 1950), Haitian-American poet, painter, and writer
- Peter J. Phipps (born 1973), American judge
- Polly Phipps, American statistician
- Prikeba Phipps, American Olympic volleyball player
- Quentin Phipps, American politician and member of the Connecticut House of Representatives
- Steve Phipps (born 1971), American football coach
- Spencer Phips (1685–1757), nephew and adoptive son of Sir William, lieutenant governor and acting governor of colonial Massachusetts
- Thomas Phipps (?–1823), London silversmith
- William Phips (1651–1695), colonial governor of Massachusetts
- William Edward Phipps (1922–2018), Hollywood actor and producer

=== Others ===
- Phipps W. Lake (1789–1860), American politician
- Bess Phipps Dawson (1916–1994), American painter

== See also ==
- Philips (disambiguation)
