= Westbury Swimming Pool =

Indoor swimming pool in Westbury, Wiltshire, England

Coordinates: 51.2604°N 2.1825°W

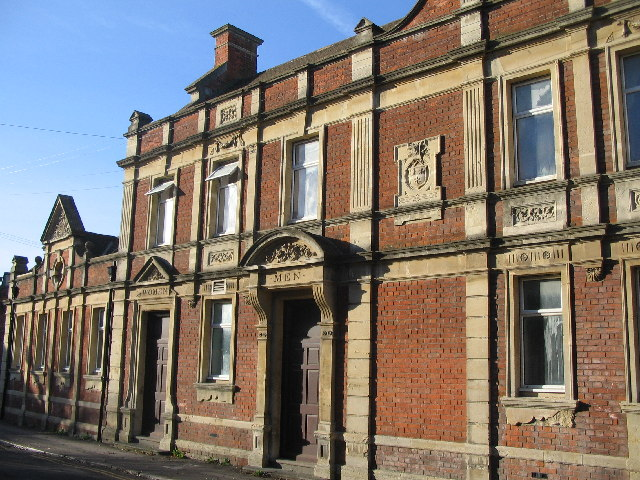
Exterior of the pool in 2005

Westbury Swimming Pool is a 19th-century indoor swimming pool in Westbury, Wiltshire, England. The structure is a Grade II listed building.

== History ==
The facility, on Church Street, Westbury, was a gift to the town from William Henry Laverton to celebrate Queen Victoria's golden jubilee. Laverton (died 1925; from 1888 the owner of the Leighton House estate) was a prominent owner of cloth mills in the town. His uncle Abraham (1819–1886) had built the Laverton Institute, amongst other gifts to the town, and may have been involved in the planning and financing of the pool.

At first called the Westbury Baths, the building opened to the public on 24 May 1887, shortly before the Golden Jubilee of Queen Victoria. During the winter months, the pool was drained and covered, so that the hall could be used for athletics and dancing.

In 1957, the pool building was altered, with some facilities re-arranged. In 1984, a new plant room was added, the roof was replaced (while retaining the original ironwork), new changing rooms were installed, and disabled access was improved.

In 2010, the pool was threatened with closure as part of a wider review of Wiltshire Council's leisure facilities. A campaign was formed to protect the pool. The building was Grade II listed in November 2010; the listing describes it as "an early example of a Victorian indoor swimming pool which has remained in use as a public pool".

== Operator ==
William Laverton conveyed the building to a charitable trust, which continues as a registered charity named Westbury Public Baths. In 1901 the trusteeship of the building was taken on by Westbury Urban District Council, which was replaced by West Wiltshire District Council in 1974; each of the councils was the sole trustee of the charity. West Wiltshire was superseded by Wiltshire Council in 2009. The charity has no endowment, therefore (as of 2015) Wiltshire Council funds the operation and maintenance of the pool, alongside its other leisure services.
