= George Fuller (British politician) =

English cricketer and politician

George Pargiter Fuller (8 January 1833 – 2 April 1927), was a businessman and Liberal Party politician in the United Kingdom who sat in the House of Commons from 1885 to 1895.

== Early life ==
Fuller was born at Baynton, Wiltshire, the eldest surviving son of John Bird Fuller, a partner in Fuller Smith & Turner, brewers, and his wife Sophia Hanning, daughter of John Hanning. He was educated at Winchester, where he played in the cricket 1st XI for two years, and at Christ Church, Oxford, where he matriculated in 1852, and graduated B.A. and M.A. in 1859. During his time at Oxford he represented the Oxford University Cricket Club and played in the Varsity match in 1854 and 1855. He played nine innings in six first-class matches with an average of 10.44 and a top score of 40. He bowled ten overs and took 6 first-class wickets.

== Occupations ==
Fuller inherited a share in the family brewery (in Chiswick, London) on his father's death in 1872, and was also chairman of Avon Rubber in Melksham. He also served as High Sheriff of Wiltshire in 1878. He lived at Neston Park, Corsham, Wiltshire.

== Politics ==
Fuller stood unsuccessfully for parliament at North Wiltshire in 1880. He was elected Member of Parliament for Westbury in the 1885 general election, a seat he held until 1895. He made 55 contributions in parliament.

He was a member of the Wiltshire County Council, chairman of the Chippenham Rural District Council and of the Corsham Parish Council and School Board and a Justice of the Peace for Wiltshire.

== Family life ==
Fuller married Emily Georgina Jane Hick Beach, second daughter of Sir Michael Hicks Beach, 8th Baronet, and sister of Lord St Aldwyn, in 1864. Fuller purchased Great Chalfield Manor, neighbouring his Neston Park estate, in 1878, at first for its farmland. The late mediaeval property was later occupied and restored by his fourth son Robert, under the direction of noted architect Harold Brakspear.

Their eldest son John (1864–1915) also became a Liberal politician and was created a baronet in 1910. Fuller died in April 1927, aged 94. His wife survived him by three years and died in December 1930.

Parliament of the United Kingdom
Preceded by Charles N. P. Phipps	Member of Parliament for Westbury; 1885 – 1895	Succeeded by Richard Chaloner
Honorary titles
Preceded by Richard Walmesley	High Sheriff of Wiltshire; 1878–1879	Succeeded by
