= Chalcot House =

English country house

Coordinates: 51.2383°N 2.2263°W

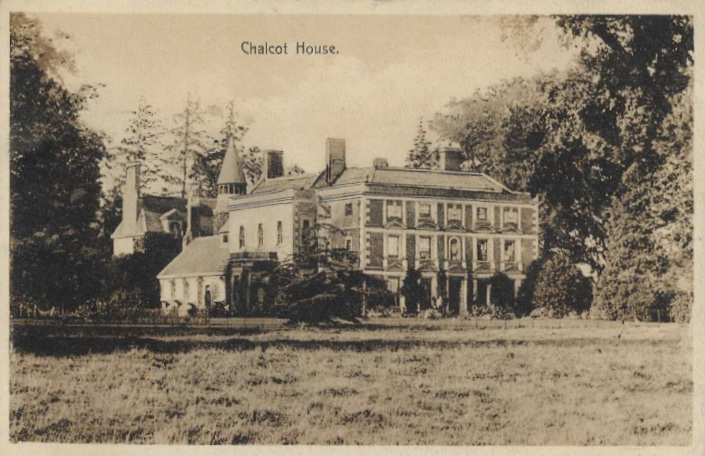
Chalcot House, by Richard Wilkinson, postcard c. 1910

Chalcot House is a Grade II* listed country house to the south of the village of Dilton Marsh, near Westbury, Wiltshire, England, standing in Chalcot Park.

== History ==
Chalcot House was built in the early 18th century on the site of an older house. In the nineteenth century, it was owned by Charles Paul Phipps (1815–1880), a merchant in Brazil, later Conservative MP for Westbury (1869–1874) and High Sheriff of Wiltshire for 1875. Phipps had the house extensively altered in 1872 by the fashionable architect James Piers St Aubyn. Phipps was succeeded at Chalcot by his son Charles N. P. Phipps (1845–1913), also a member of parliament and High Sheriff.

The three-storey house, in Flemish bond brickwork with stone dressings, has a five-bay front with pilasters flanking the ground-floor windows.

Alterations were made in the twentieth century by the architect Theo Crosby and the house was restored again in 1970. A hoard of Romano-British coins was found buried near the house in 1973. An auction of contents was held at the house by Sotheby's in 1989. The house was sold by Nicholas Phipps, the last of the family to live there, and papers relating to the family are now held by the Wiltshire and Swindon History Centre.

In the 1990s, the house was owned by the stockbroker Tony Rudd, father of Amber Rudd.
