= Sir John Fuller, 1st Baronet =

British politician

Sir John Fuller Bt KCMG

13th Governor of Victoria
- In office 24 May 1911 – 24 November 1913
- Monarch: George V
- Premier: John Murray (1911–12); William Watt (1912–13)
- Preceded by: Sir Thomas Gibson-Carmichael
- Succeeded by: Sir Arthur Stanley

Personal details
- Born: 21 October 1864 Neston Park, Corsham, Wiltshire
- Died: 4 September 1915 (aged 50) Atworth, Wiltshire
- Party: Liberal Party
- Parent: George Fuller
- Education: Winchester College; Christ Church, Oxford

Sir John Michael Fleetwood Fuller, 1st Baronet, KCMG (21 October 1864 – 4 September 1915) was a British Liberal Party politician and colonial administrator.

== Biography ==
Fuller was the eldest son of George Fuller, of Neston Park, Corsham, Wiltshire, and his wife Emily Georgina Jane, daughter of Sir Michael Hicks Beach, 8th Baronet, and was educated at Winchester and Christ Church, Oxford.

He unsuccessfully contested Parliament three times but in 1900 he was successfully returned for Westbury. He served under Sir Henry Campbell-Bannerman as a Junior Lord of the Treasury from 1906 to 1907 and under Campbell-Bannerman and later H. H. Asquith as Vice-Chamberlain of the Household from 1907 to 1911. He was created a Baronet, of Neston Park in Corsham in the County of Wiltshire, in 1910.

The following year Fuller resigned his seat in the House of Commons on his appointment as Governor of Victoria. He remained in this position until his resignation for health and family reasons in November 1913. He had been appointed a Knight Commander of the Order of St Michael and St George in the 1911 Coronation Honours.

Fuller married Norah Jacintha, daughter of Charles Nicholas Paul Phipps, in 1898. They had two sons and four daughters. He died in September 1915, aged only 50, and was succeeded in the baronetcy by his eldest son Gerard. Lady Fuller later remarried and died in 1935.

== Electoral record ==
General election 1892: Chippenham
Party	Candidate	Votes	%	±%
Conservative	Sir John Poynder Dickson-Poynder	3,684		
Liberal	John Michael Fleetwood Fuller	3,455		
Majority		229		
Turnout				
Conservative hold		Swing		

General election 1895: Bath
Party	Candidate	Votes	%	±%
Conservative	Charles Wyndham Murray	3,445		
Liberal Unionist	Edmond Robert Wodehouse	3,358		
Liberal	Sir William Martin Conway	2,917		
Liberal	John Michael Fleetwood Fuller	2,865		
Majority				
Turnout				
Conservative hold		Swing		

1897 Salisbury by-election
Party	Candidate	Votes	%	±%
Conservative	Augustus Henry Eden Allhusen	1,425		
Liberal	John Michael Fleetwood Fuller	1,278		
Majority		147		
Turnout				
Conservative hold		Swing		

General election 1900: Westbury
Party	Candidate	Votes	%	±%
Liberal	John Michael Fleetwood Fuller	4,520	53.3	
Conservative	Richard Godolphin Walmesley Chaloner	3,961	46.7	
Majority		559	6.6	
Turnout			86.7	
Liberal gain from Conservative		Swing		

General election 1906: Westbury
Party	Candidate	Votes	%	±%
Liberal	John Michael Fleetwood Fuller	5,264	58.2	+4.9
Conservative	Lord Dunsany	3,788	41.8	−4.9
Majority		1,476	16.4	+9.8
Turnout			89.4	+2.7
Liberal hold		Swing	+4.9	

General election January 1910: Westbury
Party	Candidate	Votes	%	±%
Liberal	John Michael Fleetwood Fuller	5,279		
Conservative	Robert Long	4,525		
Majority				
Turnout				
Liberal hold		Swing		

General election December 1910: Westbury
Party	Candidate	Votes	%	±%
Liberal	Sir John Michael Fleetwood Fuller	5,041	54.8	
Conservative	George Palmer	4,152	45.2	
Majority		889	9.6	
Turnout			88.3	
Liberal hold		Swing		

Coat of arms of Sir John Fuller, 1st Baronet
Crest Issuant from a coronet flory Or a lion’s head per pale Azure and Ermine. Escutcheon Per pale nebuly Azure and Ermine two bars counterchanged over all six martlets two two and two Or. Supporters On the dexter a lion reguardant Proper and on the sinister a wolf reguardant Argent each gorged with a collar Or pendent therefrom an escutcheon per pale nebuly Azure and Or charged with six martlets counterchanged.

Parliament of the United Kingdom
Preceded by Richard Chaloner	Member of Parliament for Westbury; 1900–1911	Succeeded by Geoffrey Howard
Political offices
Preceded by Herbert Lewis; Joseph Pease; Freeman Freeman-Thomas; Cecil Norton	Junior Lord of the Treasury; 1906–1907; With: Herbert Lewis; Joseph Pease; Cecil Norton	Succeeded by Herbert Lewis; Joseph Pease; Cecil Norton; John Henry Whitley
Preceded by Wentworth Beaumont	Vice-Chamberlain of the Household; 1907–1911	Succeeded by Geoffrey William Algernon Howard
Government offices
Preceded by Sir Thomas Gibson-Carmichael	Governor of Victoria; 1911–1913	Succeeded by Sir Arthur Stanley
Baronetage of the United Kingdom
New creation	Baronet (of Neston Park); 1910–1915	Succeeded by John Gerard Henry Fleetwood Fuller
