= Neston Park =

Estate in Wiltshire, England

Coordinates: 51.403°N 2.200°W

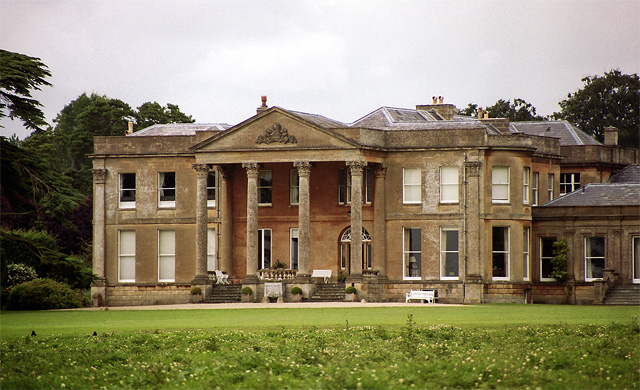
Neston Park

Neston Park is an English country house and estate in the village of Neston, some 2 miles (3 km) south of Corsham, Wiltshire. The name of the village of Neston is derived from the name of the house.

The present house dates from 1790 and has been extended several times since then. It is ashlar-built in two storeys (three storeys at rear) with a frontage of eight bays, and is Grade II* listed.

The grounds of the house contain farmland: the estate extends from north of Neston village, southwards beyond Atworth, to South Wraxall, and includes the certified organic home farm with a herd of Jersey cattle and unusual Aberdeen Angus and Jersey cross-bred cattle. The route of the ancient Roman road from London to Bath crosses the home farm from east to west, about 200 metres (700 feet) south of the house. The local portion of the road is sometimes known as the Wansdyke.

== History ==
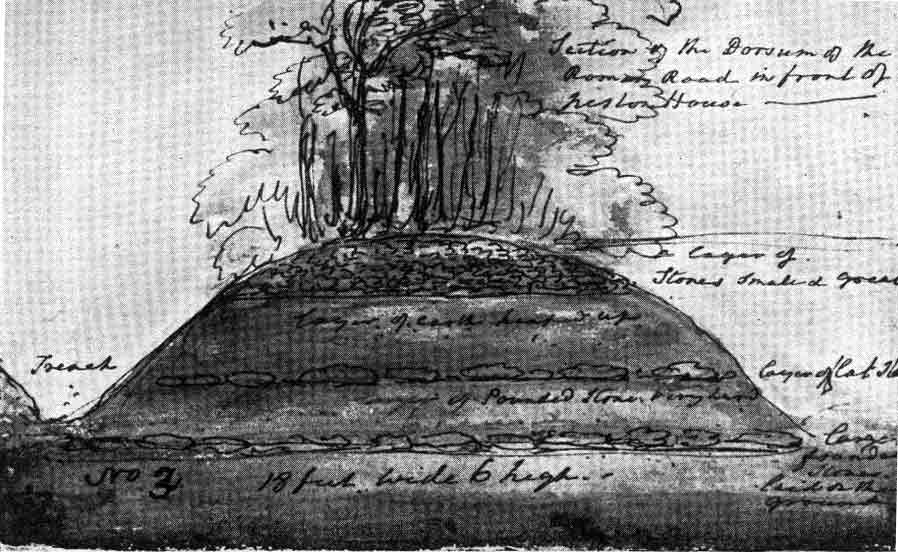
The raised course of the Roman road has been reduced by 19th-century landscaping

The Neston estate was built up by Thomas Tropenell in the 15th century, passed to the Eyre family and then by marriage to the Baronets Hanham. They sold it c. 1790 to John Fuller (died 1839), who built Neston House. John was succeeded in turn by John Bird Fuller (died 1872), George Pargiter Fuller MP (died 1927), and other descendants. The Fuller family became well known for its ownership of Fuller's Brewery in London, producer of Fuller's London Pride cask ale.

In 1864 John Hanning Speke, an explorer and a nephew of John Bird Fuller, died from a self-inflicted gunshot wound while shooting partridge at Neston Park, seemingly an accident in climbing over a wall.

In 1910, the then owner of Neston Park, John Michael Fuller MP, was created a baronet on the recommendation of the Asquith government. In 1998 James Fuller became the proprietor, estate manager and fourth Baronet.

In the late 1990s, the estate went into a Countryside Stewardship Scheme agreement with the Ministry of Agriculture, Fisheries and Food, supporting a programme of hedge, wall, and wild flower field margin restoration. A farm shop and coffee shop were established in Atworth in 2006. In 2013, a Bath stone mine on the estate called Park Lane Quarry, first worked in 1880, was reopened.

Unlike the neighbouring English country house Great Chalfield Manor, occupied by other members of the Fuller family, the house at Neston Park is not open to the public, although several public paths cross the parkland.

== Filming location ==
The estate has been used as the filming location of a number of productions, including the outdoor sets for the 2008 BBC television adaptation of Lark Rise to Candleford, some scenes of the ITV series Persuasion, and the 2015 BBC remake of Poldark.

== Music festivals ==
From 2026 the site is to host the annual WOMAD music festival after a sabbatical and a move from their previous Wiltshire home in Charlton Park. The first festival was held on 23, 24, 25 and 26 July 2026.

== See also ==
- Hanham baronets
- Fuller baronets
