= 1869 Westbury by-election =

UK Parliamentary by-election

The 1869 Westbury by-election was fought on 27 February 1869. The by-election was fought due to the void election of the incumbent MP of the Conservative Party, John Lewis Phipps. It was won by the Conservative candidate Charles Paul Phipps.
