= Westbury Ironstone Quarry =

Geological Site of Special Scientific Interest in Wiltshire, England

Coordinates: 51.2576°N 2.2124°W

Westbury Ironstone Quarry (grid reference ST853508) is a 5,600-square-metre geological Site of Special Scientific Interest located just west of Westbury in Wiltshire, England. It was notified in 1965. The quarry was once an important source of Upper Oxfordian Westbury Iron Ore.

== Sources ==
- Natural England citation sheet for the site (accessed 25 May 2023)
