= Thomas Long (died 1593) =

English politician

Thomas Long (1539 – 30 June 1593), also spelt Longe, was the first Englishman to be punished for being elected to the House of Commons of England by bribery.

After being returned as one of the two Members of the Parliament of England for Westbury in 1571, Long was found to be "a simple man, and of small capacity to serve in parliament". On enquiries being made, it transpired that he had paid Anthony Garland, the returning officer, and a Mr Wat, the sum of four pounds to be elected. For this conduct, which was described as "the said lewd and scandalous attempt", the borough of Westbury was amerced twenty pounds, Long was removed from office, and the returning officer was both fined and imprisoned.

Long's identity is not completely clear from the historical record; the dates given here are from the History of Parliament, which notes the existence of another Thomas Long, his uncle, as well as a younger brother, also Thomas Long. He died in 1593, leaving three sons and three daughters, and an estate of around £300.
