= Griffin Curteys =

16th-century English politician

Griffin (Griffith) Curteys or Curtis (by 1521 – 30 November 1587), of Bradenstoke, Wiltshire, was an English estate steward, notably to Sir Henry Long, and member of parliament.

He was a Member (MP) of the Parliament of England for Calne in 1547, Westbury in October 1553, April 1554 and November 1554, Malmesbury in 1558 and Ludgershall in 1563.
