= Charles N. P. Phipps =

Phipps in 1880

Charles Nicholas Paul Phipps (4 November 1845 – 9 December 1913), of Chalcot House, near Westbury, Wiltshire, known to his friends and family as Nicholas Phipps, was a merchant trading with Brazil, who sat as Conservative MP for Westbury (1880–1885) and was High Sheriff of Wiltshire (1888).

He was the eldest son of Charles Paul Phipps (1815–1880) and Emma Mary Benson. Having been educated at Eton, he was sent to Brazil to work for the family firm, Phipps & Co, which exported coffee from Rio de Janeiro. In 1871, following the death of his uncle, John Lewis Phipps, he became a partner in the firm.

At the 1880 general election, Phipps was elected as the Conservative Member of Parliament for Westbury. A petition by the defeated Liberal Party candidate (and outgoing Member), Abraham Laverton, to have his election annulled on the grounds of bribery, treating and undue influence, failed. He represented Westbury in the House of Commons until 1885, but did not stand again and was succeeded by George Fuller, a Liberal.

A freemason, Phipps was a member of the Longleat Lodge of Warminster and in 1887 was one of those who successfully petitioned the Provincial Grand Lodge to establish the White Horse Lodge at Westbury.

He was also a member of Wiltshire County Council and served as chairman of the Selection Committee from 1911 to 1913.

Phipps died in 1913 aged 68. In 1874, he married Clare, the daughter of Sir Frederick Hervey Bathurst, of Clarendon Park, near Salisbury. They had one son and six daughters. The son, Charles Bathurst Hele Phipps, married Lady Sybil Montagu Douglas Scott, second daughter of the 7th Duke of Buccleuch. One daughter, Norah Jacintha, married Sir John Fuller, 1st Baronet, of Neston Park, Wiltshire, the son of the George Fuller who had succeeded Phipps in parliament, and was the mother of Sir Gerard Fuller, 2nd Baronet.

== Sources ==
- Notes on the 'Westbury' Phipps Pedigrees, John C. Phipps (1983, unpublished)
- Papers of the Phipps family of Leighton and Chalcot (Ref. 540) at the Wiltshire and Swindon History Centre (National Archives catalogue)
- Burke's Landed Gentry
- Leigh Rayment's Historical List of MPs

Parliament of the United Kingdom
Preceded by Abraham Laverton	Member of Parliament for Westbury; 1880 – 1885	Succeeded by George Fuller
