= Charles Darbishire =

British politician and East India merchant

Charles Darbishire

Charles William Darbishire (17 June 1875 – 5 June 1925) was a British Liberal politician and East India merchant.

== Early life and family ==
Darbishire was born in London, the son of Colonel C. H. Darbishire of Plas Mawr, Penmaenmawr in North Wales. He was educated at Giggleswick School in Yorkshire. In 1905 he married Frances Middleton whose father had been Sheriff, or local judge, in Fort William, Scotland. Darbishire served as a volunteer member of the armed forces. He was a member of the Artists Rifles between 1897 and 1899 and the Royal Welch Fusiliers, Territorial Force from 1905 to 1908, attaining the rank of Lieutenant.

== East Asian connections ==
Darbishire went into the trading business. He was associated with the East India merchant trade and had particular connections with Malaya and Singapore. He became one of the managing directors of Paterson Simons & Co, which traded between London, the Straits Settlements and the Federated Malay States. He became an acknowledged expert on trade with area and contributed the chapter on Commerce and Currency to the book One Hundred Years of Singapore: being some account of the capital of the Straits Settlements from its foundation by Sir Stamford Raffles on 6 February 1819 to the 6 February 1919 which was published in 1921.

== Public service in Singapore ==
Darbishire lived in Singapore for some years and became involved in public and military service there as well as commercial life. He served as a member of the Municipal Commission of Singapore from 1908 to 1910, was an unofficial member of the Legislative Council of the Straits Settlements from 1910 to 1919 and a member of the Singapore Harbour Board between 1910 and 1919. He was also Chairman of the Singapore Chamber of Commerce from 1914 to 1919. He carried on his volunteer soldiering in Singapore and was Officer Commanding the Singapore Volunteer Rifles from 1914 to 1919, with the rank of temporary Major. In February and March 1915 he was involved in the operations to suppress the Singapore Mutiny. In 1921-22 he was President of the Association of British Malaya, a pressure group formed to represent planting, mining and commercial interests in the Malay states.

== Liberal politics ==
In 1922, Darbishire was adopted as the Liberal candidate for the Wiltshire constituency of Westbury. Although the seat had been represented by both Conservatives and Liberals over the years since it became a county seat in 1885 it had been Liberal for most of the time. At the 1918 general election a Coalition Conservative, Brigadier-General George Palmer had received the government 'coupon', the official letter of endorsement from Prime Minister David Lloyd George and the Conservative leader Bonar Law. Darbishire won the election of 1922 standing as a Liberal, defeating Palmer in a three-cornered contest.

== The 1923 general election ==
At the next election, however, Darbishire was in more difficulty. Although Westbury could be termed a traditionally Liberal seat (unusually for Wiltshire) resting on foundations of Nonconformism and the Liberal tradition, the character of the seat was changing with industrialisation. The new Unionist candidate, Captain Shaw, seemed more in tune with the times than the old one and Darbishire probably suffered by his refusal to support the call for protectionism in motor tyre production made to him by workers in the industry locally. There was high unemployment amongst workers in the rubber industry in Melksham and Bradford on Avon. Elsewhere in the country, the traditional Liberal policy of Free Trade was helping to reunite the party and was proving a popular policy. In Westbury however, it seemed less convincing to commentators on Liberal election prospects against the poor economic and industrial background in the area. Labour obviously tried to capitalise upon this situation and took the decision to abandon campaigning in Chippenham to concentrate on Westbury. They took votes from Darbishire but not enough to deprive him of the seat. At the 1924 general election, however Unionist prospects were altogether brighter and in another three-cornered contest, Darbishire lost out to Captain Shaw.

== Death ==
Darbishire did not get the chance to contest any more Parliamentary elections. He died aged 49 in Singapore general hospital in June 1925, having been taken ill a few days earlier. He had been taking a tour of the Far East travelling with his wife and had arrived in Singapore from Siam (as Thailand was then known).

Parliament of the United Kingdom
Preceded by George Palmer	Member of Parliament for Westbury; 1922–1924	Succeeded by Walter Shaw
