= 1911 Westbury by-election =

1911 UK parliamentary by-election

The 1911 Westbury by-election was a Parliamentary by-election held on 22 February 1911. The constituency returned one Member of Parliament (MP) to the House of Commons of the Parliament of the United Kingdom, elected by the first past the post voting system.

== Vacancy ==
The sitting Liberal Member for Westbury, Sir John Fuller, resigned his seat in the House of Commons on his appointment as Governor of Victoria. He had represented the constituency since 1900, when he gained it from the Conservatives.

== Electoral history ==
General election December 1910: Westbury Electorate 10,411
Party	Candidate	Votes	%	±%
Liberal	John Fuller	5,041	54.8	+0.9
Conservative	George Palmer	4,152	45.2	−0.9
Majority		889	9.6	+1.8
Turnout		9,193	88.3	−4.1
Liberal hold		Swing	+0.9	

== Candidates ==
- The new Liberal candidate was Geoffrey Howard, who had previously been the member for Eskdale in Cumberland. He had been defeated at the last general election in December 1910. Since then he had served as a Private Secretary to the Prime Minister, H. H. Asquith.
- The Conservatives re-selected local man George Palmer, their defeated candidate from the last election. He had been High Sheriff of Wiltshire in 1903 and since 1910 had been a Lieutenant-Colonel commanding the Royal Wiltshire Yeomanry.

== Result ==
On an increased turnout, the Liberal Party held the seat with only a 1.8% swing against them.

Geoffrey Howard

1911 Westbury by-election Electorate 10,612
Party	Candidate	Votes	%	±%
Liberal	Geoffrey Howard	5,073	53.0	−1.8
Conservative	George Palmer	4,492	47.0	+1.8
Majority		581	6.0	−3.6
Turnout		9,565	90.1	+1.8
Liberal hold		Swing	-1.8	

== Aftermath ==
A general election was due to take place by the end of 1915, and by the autumn of 1914, the following candidates had been adopted to contest it at Westbury.

- Liberal Party: Geoffrey Howard
- Unionist Party:George Palmer

However, due to the outbreak of war, there was no general election until 1918. At the 1918 general election, a former Liberal member of parliament, who had joined the Labour Party in 1916, intervened in the contest, handing the seat to the Unionists.

General election 14 December 1918: Westbury Electorate 29,208
Party	Candidate	Votes	%	±%
Unionist	*George Palmer	9,261	49.1	+3.9
Liberal	Geoffrey Howard	6,064	32.1	−22.7
Labour	Ernest Bennett	3,537	18.8	New
Majority		3,197	17.0	N/A
Turnout		18,862	64.6	−23.7
Unionist gain from Liberal		Swing	+13.3	

- Candidate endorsed by the Coalition Government.
