= Geoffrey Howard (British politician) =

English Liberal politician

The Honourable Geoffrey Howard JP

Vice-Chamberlain of the Household
- In office 6 February 1911 – 25 May 1915
- Monarch: George V
- Prime Minister: H. H. Asquith
- Preceded by: Sir John Fuller, Bt
- Succeeded by: Cecil Beck

Personal details
- Born: 12 February 1877
- Died: 20 June 1935 (aged 58)
- Party: Liberal
- Spouse: Hon. Ethel Methuen (1915–1932; her death)
- Children: 5, including Christian and George
- Parent(s): The 9th Earl of Carlisle; The Hon. Rosalind Stanley
- Education: Trinity College, Cambridge

Capt. Hon. Geoffrey William Algernon Howard JP (12 February 1877 – 20 June 1935) was an English Liberal politician from the Howard family. He served as Vice-Chamberlain of the Household under H. H. Asquith between 1911 and 1915. He served in the Royal Marines in the First World War.

== Background and education ==
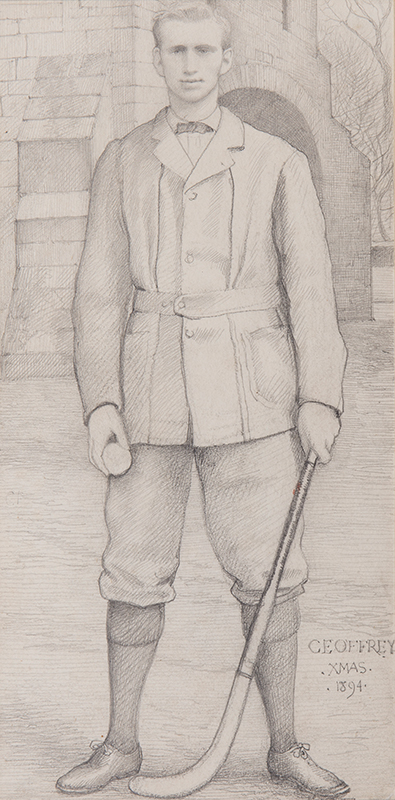
Geoffrey, drawn by his father in 1894

Howard was the fifth son of George Howard, 9th Earl of Carlisle (1843–1911), and The Honourable Rosalind Frances Stanley, daughter of Edward Stanley, 2nd Baron Stanley of Alderley.

His father, an artist and politician, inherited the Earldom of Carlisle from his uncle in 1889. The family lived at Naworth Castle in Cumbria. He was one of 11 children and outlived his five brothers.

His elder brother Hubert George Lyulph Howard (1871–1898) was killed at the Battle of Omdurman while working as a war correspondent for The Times. His father died in 1911 and his eldest brother, Charles, succeeded as the 10th Earl of Carlisle. His brother Christopher (1873–1896) died of pneumonia at Slains Castle after contracting a cold at a shooting party; and his brother Oliver FSA FRGS (1875–1908) died in Nigeria where he was stationed with the Foreign Office. After Charles died in 1912, just a year after inheriting the earldom, Geoffrey became heir presumptive to his Charles' only son, George Howard, 11th Earl of Carlisle, until 1923. His youngest brother, Lt. Michael Francis Stafford Howard (1880–1917), was missing and was finally presumed killed in action in the First World War.

He was educated at Trinity College, Cambridge, where he graduated as a Master of Arts. He was also joint Secretary of the Cambridge University Liberal Club from 1897 to 1899.

On the break-up of his father's estates (which had been left to his mother and subsequently to his sister Lady Mary, wife of Gilbert Murray), he was allocated Castle Howard.

== Political career ==
Howard was selected as Liberal candidate for the Eskdale division of Cumberland at the 1906 General Election. As part of the Liberal landslide victory he gained the seat for the party, ousting the sitting Conservative Claude Lowther with a swing of 6%.

In 1909, he was appointed private secretary to the Parliamentary Secretary to the Board of Trade, Harold Tennant. The Liberal Party lost ground at the January 1910 general election, but Howard held his seat, and was appointed private secretary to the Prime Minister H. H. Asquith.

Another General Election followed 11 months later but this time Howard lost his Eskdale seat to Claude Lowther.

Out of Parliament, he was keen to make a return as soon as possible. In 1911 a vacancy occurred in the Westbury division of Wiltshire when the sitting Liberal MP resigned to take up a diplomatic appointment. Howard was chosen as the Liberal candidate for the resulting by-election and retained the seat with a slightly reduced majority.

In 1911, Asquith appointed him Vice-Chamberlain of the Household, a post he held until 1915. He then served as a Junior Lord of the Treasury from 1915 to 1916. In 1916, Asquith was replaced as prime minister by Lloyd George and went into opposition to the Coalition Government. Howard followed Asquith into opposition. As a result, when the Coalition was endorsing candidates for the 1918 General election, at Westbury, endorsement was given to his Unionist opponent George Palmer, who defeated Howard by a margin of 17%.

At the 1922 general election, he sought a return to Parliament in his old stomping ground of Cumberland when he contested the unionist-held North Cumberland. However, he lost narrowly, by a margin of 1.6%.

The next year, at the 1923 general election, Howard fought the Luton division of Bedfordshire. The Liberals were experiencing something of a revival nationally, which helped him win the seat from the sitting Unionist Sir John Prescott Hewett.

Another general election followed a year later in 1924, and with the Unionists in the ascendency, he lost his seat. This effectively ended Howard's parliamentary career as he did not contest another parliamentary seat.

Apart from his political career Howard was also a Justice of Peace and a temporary lieutenant in the Royal Naval Division in 1914. In 1931, he became Lord Lieutenant of the North Riding of Yorkshire, which he remained until his death four years later.

== Marriage and issue ==
Howard married Hon. Ethel Christian Methuen, daughter of Field Marshal Paul Methuen, 3rd Baron Methuen, on 15 May 1915. They had five children. Their three sons all served in the Second World War, but only one survived.

- Dame Christian Howard (1916–1999)
- Maj. Mark Paul Geoffrey Howard (10 June 1918 – 2 July 1944), died of wounds received in Normandy
- George Howard, Baron Howard of Henderskelfe (1920–1984), severely wounded in action in Burma; later chairman of the BBC
- Flt.-Lt. Christopher John Geoffrey Howard (31 May 1922 – 7 October 1944), shot down over Germany
- Katharine Cecelia Gabriel (12 December 1930 – 23 October 1979) married Stephen Nicholas Spens, son of Sir Will Spens

Ethel Howard died in April 1932, aged 43. Howard died in June 1935, aged 58.

Parliament of the United Kingdom
Preceded by Claude Lowther	Member of Parliament for Eskdale; 1906 – Dec. 1910	Succeeded by Claude Lowther
Preceded by Sir John Fuller	Member of Parliament for Westbury; 1911 – 1918	Succeeded by George Palmer
Preceded by John Prescott Hewett	Member of Parliament for Luton; 1923 – 1924	Succeeded by Terence O'Connor
Political offices
Preceded by Sir John Fuller, Bt	Vice-Chamberlain of the Household; 1911–1915	Succeeded by Cecil Beck
Honorary titles
Preceded by Sir Thomas Bell, Bt	Lord Lieutenant of the North Riding of Yorkshire; 1931–1935	Succeeded by The Lord Bolton
