= Westbury, Wiltshire =

Market town in Wiltshire, England

Coordinates: 51.260°N 2.191°W

Westbury
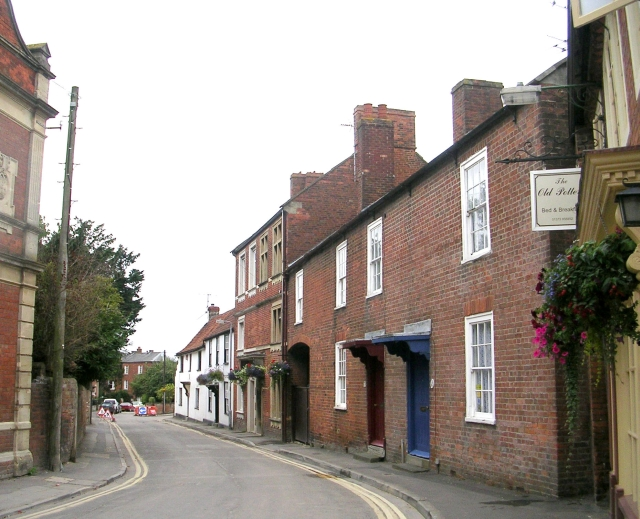
- Church Street, Westbury

- Location within Wiltshire
- Population: 16,414 (2021 Census)
- OS grid reference: ST868511
- Unitary authority: Wiltshire
- Ceremonial county: Wiltshire
- Region: South West
- Country: England
- Sovereign state: United Kingdom
- Post town: WESTBURY
- Postcode district: BA13
- Dialling code: 01373
- Police: Wiltshire
- Fire: Dorset and Wiltshire
- Ambulance: South Western
- UK Parliament: South West Wiltshire
- Website: Town Council

Westbury is a market town and civil parish in west Wiltshire, England. The town lies below the northwestern edge of Salisbury Plain, about 4 miles (6 km) south of Trowbridge and a similar distance north of Warminster.

Westbury was known for the annual Hill Fair where many sheep were sold in the 18th and 19th centuries; later growth came from the town's position at the intersection of two railway lines. The busy A350, which connects the M4 motorway with the south coast, passes through the town. The urban area has expanded to include the village of Westbury Leigh and the hamlets of Chalford and Frogmore.

== Toponymy ==
The most likely origin of the West- in Westbury is simply that the town is near the western edge of the county of Wiltshire, the bounds of which have been much the same since the Anglo-Saxon period.

The -bury part of the name is a form of borough, which has cognates in many languages, such as the German -burg and the Greek -pyrgos. It carries the idea of a hill or fortified town. In Wiltshire, -bury often indicates an Iron Age or Bronze Age fortified hill fort, and such a site is to be found immediately above the Westbury White Horse.

== History ==
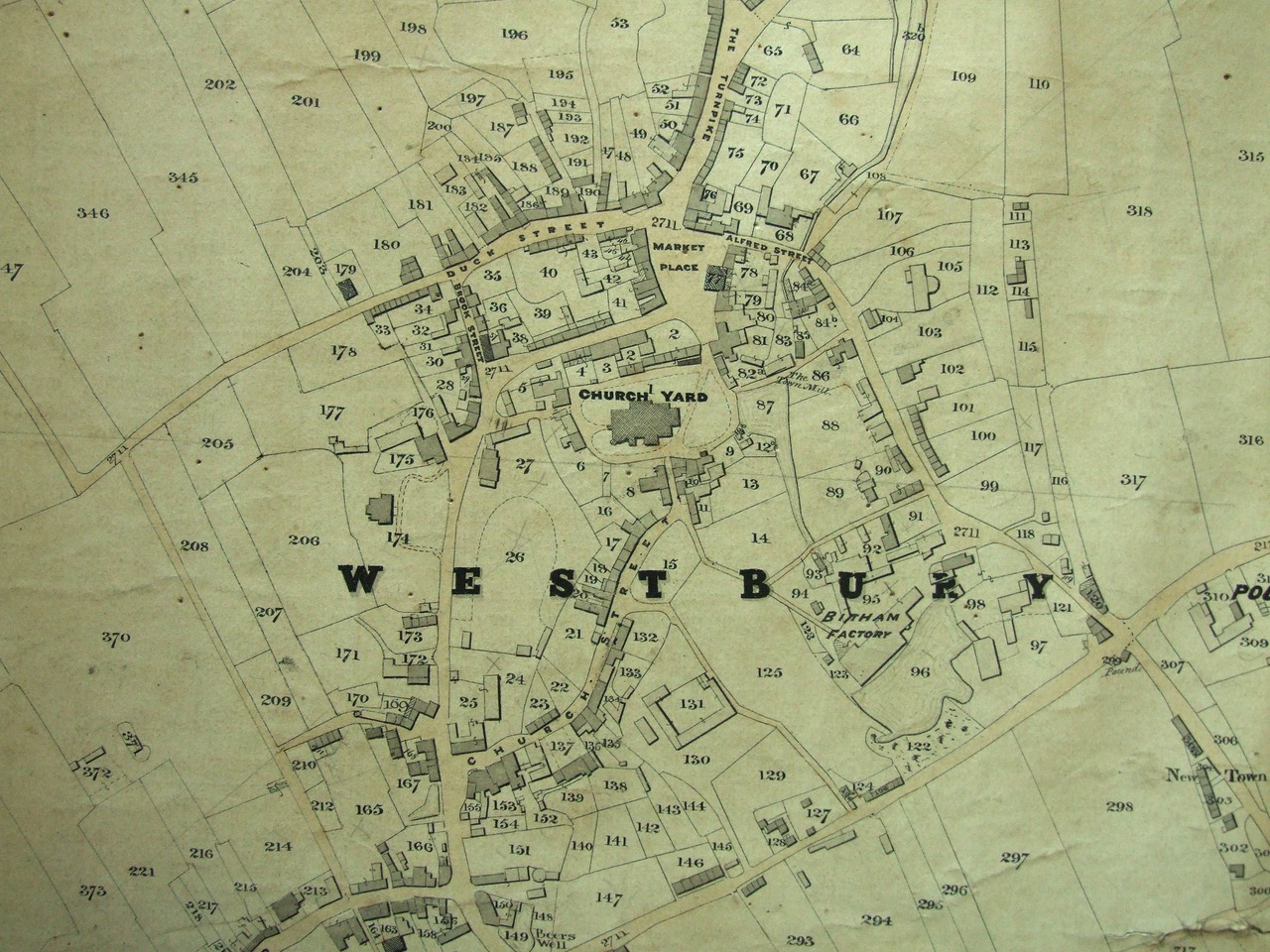
The Tithe Map of 1842 (town centre section)

A Romano-British settlement was found at The Ham, in the north of the parish, in the 1870s.

A moated site at Westbury Leigh called Palace Garden was reputed to have been a residence of Anglo-Saxon kings.

The manor of Westbury, and the hundred with the same boundaries, was held by the king at the time of the Domesday survey in 1086. The Wiltshire Victoria County History recounts the fragmentation into manors, and traces their ownership. The ancient parish included Bratton, Dilton, Dilton Marsh, Heywood and part of Chapmanslade. Churches at Bratton and Dilton were dependent chapels of Westbury church.

In 1252, Henry III granted Walter de Pavely the right to hold weekly markets on Fridays and an annual fair lasting three days from 31 October. In 1460, Henry VI granted three annual fairs lasting three days from 22 April, Whit Monday, and 13 September, and weekly markets on Thursdays.

Westbury centres on its historic marketplace – although markets ceased to be held in the middle of the 19th century – and the All Saints' Church. This was built between c. 1340 and 1380 in a transitional style between the Decorated and Perpendicular Gothic and parts survive, but the church was rebuilt in the 1430s, when a clerestory, three chapels, and most of the central tower were added; the north chapel was given by William de Westbury and his father. The west window was donated in the 19th century by Abraham Laverton.

Westbury was incorporated as a borough by royal charter in 1448. The charter is lost, although there was a tradition that it had been burned. The borough had a corporation consisting of a mayor, recorder, and thirteen capital burgesses, appointed for life by the corporation, and the duties of the mayor were to act as returning officer for the parliamentary elections and to preside in the borough court. The borough was not reformed by the Municipal Corporations Act 1835, remaining an unreformed borough until 1886, when its corporation was abolished.

The Wilts, Somerset and Weymouth Railway was completed from near Chippenham, via Melksham and Trowbridge, as far as Westbury in 1848. That company was bought by the Great Western Railway in 1850, who over the next few years built lines onwards to Frome (to access the Somerset coalfield), then south to Yeovil and Weymouth, as well as southeast from Westbury to Warminster and then Salisbury. Westbury station was rebuilt in 1899 since it would become more important as a junction the next year, on the opening of the Stert and Westbury line. This was a faster route from London to Weymouth, which at Westbury crossed the route between the south coast and Bristol or South Wales. From 1906 the route from London was also used by trains to Taunton and Exeter.

In 1894, Westbury parish was reduced in size when a new civil parish of Dilton Marsh was created from its western part (all the land west of the Biss), and likewise Bratton parish from its eastern part. A further reduction in the north created Heywood parish in 1896. Westbury Urban District was formed in 1899, with the same boundaries as the parish. It was abolished in 1974 as a result of the Local Government Act 1972, its area becoming part of West Wiltshire district. The district was in turn abolished in 2009 on the establishment of Wiltshire Council as a unitary authority.

Leighton House in the south of the town has been home to the Army Officer Selection Board and the Cadet Force Commissioning Board since 1949. Its planned disposal was announced in March 2016, but in 2021 this decision was reversed under the Future Soldier reforms, so the board remains in place.

=== Jurassic fossils ===
A band of Late Jurassic Kimmeridge Clay runs under England from an outcrop on the Dorset coast and comes close to the surface around Westbury. Many marine fossils have been found in the pits dug for the cement works north-east of the town, notably the almost complete skull and 2-metre (6 ft) lower jaw of a new species which was named Pliosaurus carpenteri after its 1994 discoverer, Simon Carpenter. This evidence of a large reptile-like ocean predator has been conserved by Bristol Museum. A smaller fossil found in 1980 was named Pliosaurus westburyensis in 1993.

=== Industries ===
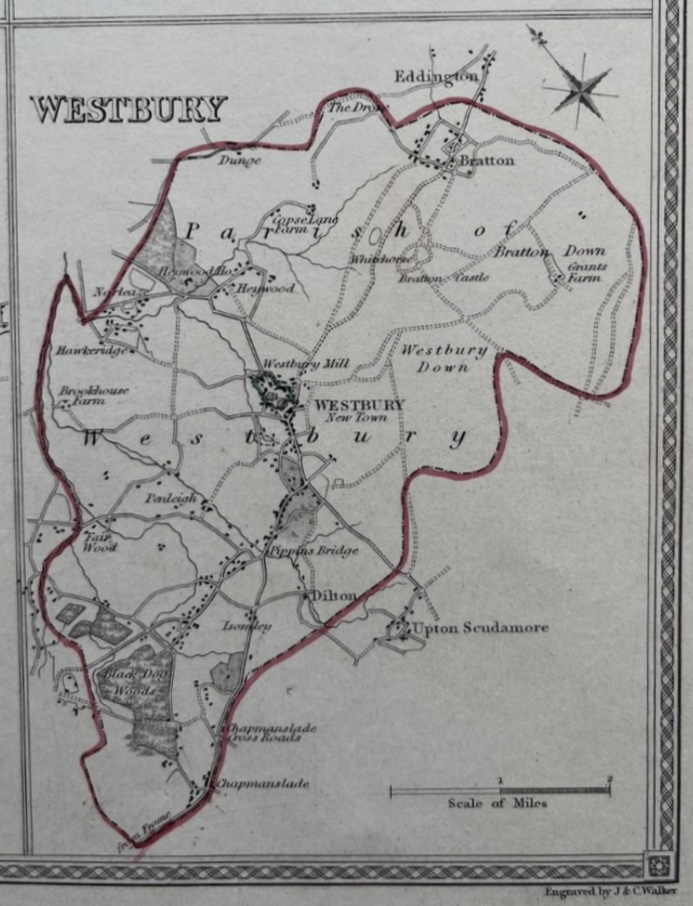
Westbury in 1835, including Bratton, Heywood, Dilton, and Chapmanslade

In common with nearby towns in the Avon valley, Westbury was a centre of the cloth industry from the later 15th century. By the start of the 19th century, Dilton Marsh was a centre of hand-loom weaving. The Phipps family were prominent among the clothiers, becoming the largest landowners by the end of the 19th century and occupying Leighton House (Westbury) and Chalcot House (Dilton Marsh). During that century the industry declined, until only the Angel and Bitham mills continued to make fine woollen cloth, having been acquired in the 1850s by Abraham Laverton; both mills closed in 1969. There were also tanning and glove-making businesses, some of them taking over the disused cloth mills for a time in the 20th century.

Malting was another important industry from at least the 17th century. In the 1830s there were six firms active in Westbury and Westbury Leigh, but by 1960 only one remained. Iron ore was discovered just north of the town in the 1840s during construction of the railway; opencast mines were developed and furnaces built. Production declined toward the end of the century and had ceased by 1925. A chain of lakes and ponds near The Ham is evidence of the abandoned workings.

== Governance ==
The majority of local government functions (including schools, roads, social services, waste disposal, emergency planning, leisure services, development control, refuse collection and street cleaning) are carried out by Wiltshire Council, a unitary authority. The area of Westbury parish is divided into three electoral divisions, each electing one member of Wiltshire Council.

Westbury is a civil parish with an elected town council of fifteen members: five for each of three wards with the same boundaries as the electoral divisions. The council has significant consultative roles, in addition to responsibility for certain local services. The chairman has the title of Mayor of Westbury which is a wholly ceremonial role. Around 2020, the council took over the running of the town's play areas, toilets and flower planting from Wiltshire Council, and supplemented reduced services from Wiltshire Council with its own staff. The council also runs the Grade II listed Laverton Institute which serves as the town hall and as a venue for events and meetings.

Westbury also has a ceremonial Mayor and Deputy Mayor who are both elected for one year terms every May by the local council. In May 2026, town Councillor Carole King was elected Mayor for the 2026-2027 mayoral term, and town Councillor Michael Sutton was also elected Deputy Mayor for the 2026-2027 mayoral term in the same council meeting.

The parliamentary constituency of Westbury dated back to the 15th century but the name was abandoned in 2010, when the town and most of the former constituency became part of the new South West Wiltshire constituency. The seat has been held by Andrew Murrison for the Conservatives since 2001.

Before the parliamentary reforms of the mid-19th century, Westbury was considered a pocket borough, at one point having as few as twenty-four electors. This status led to gifts to the town from the owners of the parliamentary borough, including the Old Town Hall in the Market Place, donated by Sir Manasseh Masseh Lopes.

== Geography ==
Westbury is in the far west of Wiltshire, close to the border with Somerset. It lies under the northwestern edge of Salisbury Plain; in the past, the name Westbury-under-the-Plain was sometimes used to distinguish it from other towns of the same name. The town is 18 miles (29 km) southeast of the city of Bath, approximately 4 miles (6 km) south of the county town of Trowbridge and the same distance north of the garrison town of Warminster. Nearby villages are Bratton, Chapmanslade, Dilton Marsh, Edington, Heywood and Hawkeridge, Coulston, and Upton Scudamore; and in Somerset, Rudge and Standerwick.

The Biss Brook, which becomes the River Biss as it flows north towards Trowbridge, forms most of the western boundary of the parish.

Suburbs of Westbury include Frogmore, Bitham Park, and The Ham (north and east), Chalford, Leigh Park, and Westbury Leigh (southwest). Westbury Leigh is sometimes considered a separate village, with its own church and chapel, although it is now a contiguous part of the town. Leigh Park is a large housing estate developed from the late 1990s immediately to the north of Westbury Leigh, with a large medical centre, a community hall, and a district centre with a Tesco Express.

== Economy ==
Until the 1940s, the Westbury Hill Fair was an important annual event, mostly for the sale of sheep.

The company which became known as Blue Circle built in 1962 a rail-served cement production plant a short distance north-east of the town, partly in Heywood parish; its two rotary kilns were for a short time the largest in the country. Chalk came from a quarry around 2 km away, and clay was dug from pits near the plant. From 1977 to 1992 part of the plant's fuel came from domestic refuse, and from 2000 tyres were burned. French company Lafarge took over Blue Circle in 2001, and cement production ended in 2009. Most of the site was demolished in 2016 but the cement silos remain in use as a distribution centre, owned since 2013 by Tarmac. From 1961 until its demolition in 2016, the plant's 400 feet (120 m) chimney was the tallest unsupported structure in southwestern England.

Businesses at the Brook Lane industrial area, north-west of the railway station, include an Arla creamery which makes Anchor butter. The West Wilts trading estate, in Heywood parish just north-west of Westbury, has Welton Bibby & Baron who claim to be the UK's largest manufacturer of paper bags and similar goods.

== Landmarks ==
Pevsner states that the best houses in Westbury are near the church. His perambulation takes in the Market Place and the streets leading off it, then proceeds south and west. He notes the 1960s central shopping parade – two yellow brick ranges facing each other – and the former Barclays Bank, 1970, purple brick in brutalist style.

Besides the Grade I listed All Saints' Church, the town has five Grade II* listed houses and one monument. Oldest among them is Ferndale House, now the Conservative Club, just east of the Market Place, which although altered dates from the early 18th century. In rendered brick, its front has two Palladian windows on each of the ground and first floor, all with small side lights.

North of the Market Place, Bank House is an early 18th century house in red brick with stone dressings; its five-bay front, with a carved stone shell hood over the central door, is passed by traffic on the A350. Leigh House at Westbury Leigh, perhaps of slightly earlier date, is a similar structure.

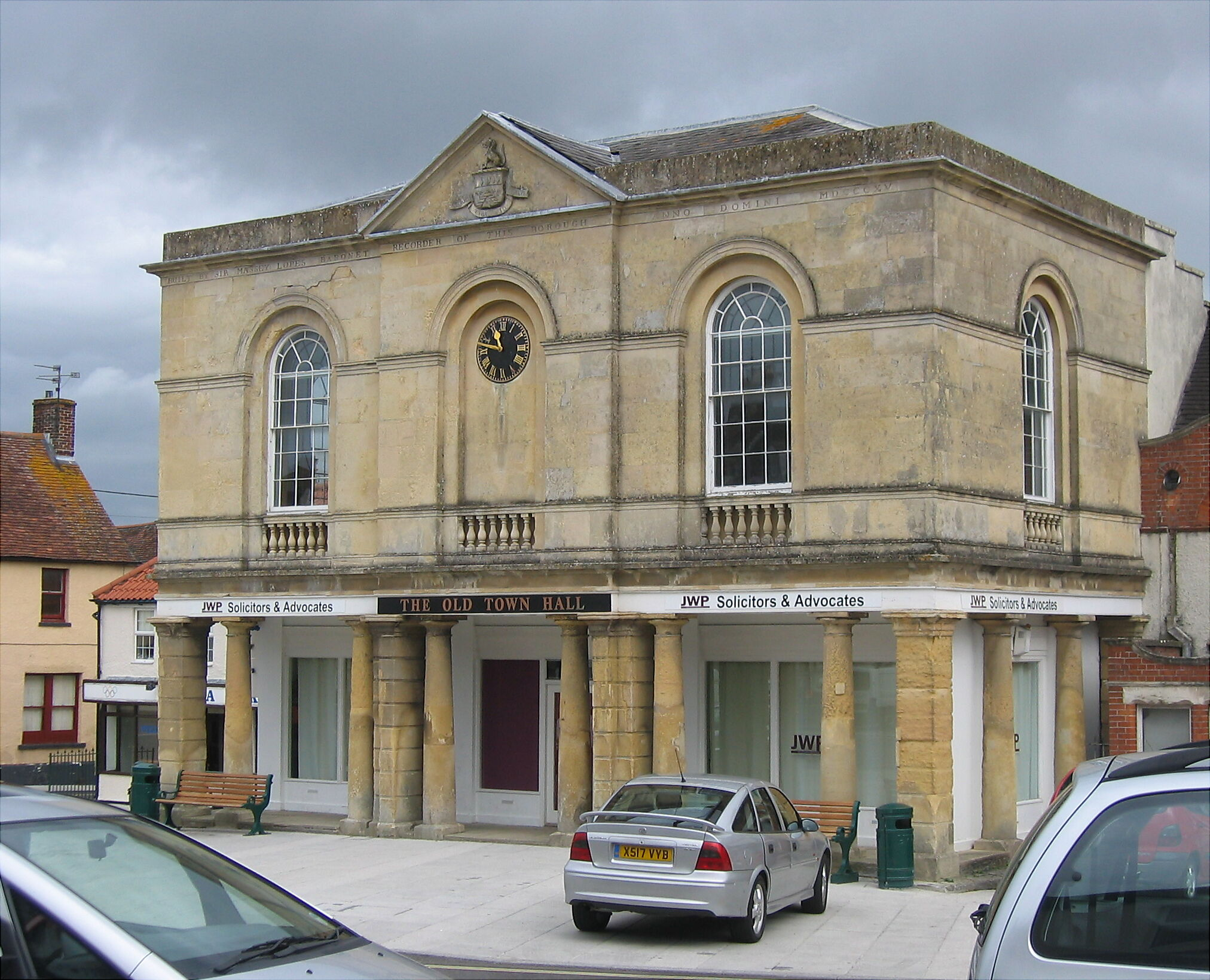
The Old Town Hall

In a central position on the Market Place, the early 19th century former town hall is in Bath stone ashlar and has a colonnaded front at street level, behind which shops were inserted in the 1970s. The first floor windows have balustraded aprons below, and above them the triangular pediment has the Lopes arms in the tympanum.

Edgar House, off Edward Street south of the town centre, is a four-bay early 18th century remodelling of an older house, faced in stucco. The Grade II* monument is the Phipps mausoleum in the cemetery, on the Bratton road on the eastern edge of the town. Dating from around 1871 (for the burial of John Lewis Phipps), the stone monument has a basement, an octagonal chamber with four windows, and a short spire with lantern.

=== White Horse ===
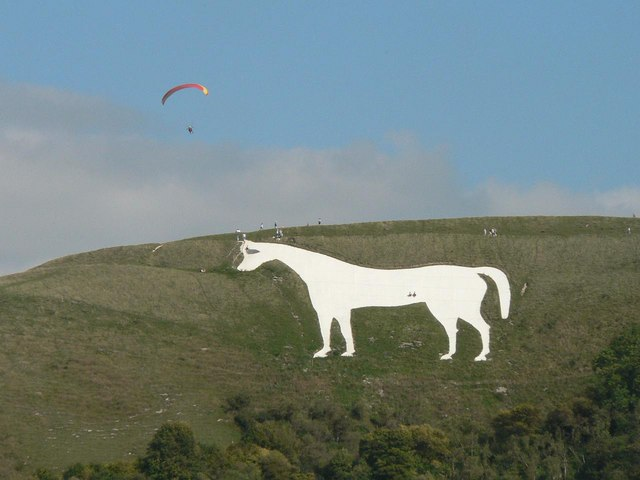
Westbury White Horse viewed from Bratton Road

A well-known feature of the area is the Westbury White Horse, which overlooks the town from a slope up to Salisbury Plain, in Bratton parish about 1 1/2 miles (2.4 km) east of the town. Probably first made in the 18th century, its present form dates from 1778 when it was restored. In the 1950s, it was decided that the horse would be more easily maintained if it were set in concrete and painted white.

== Transport ==
=== Road ===
The A350 road passes through the town and provides a fast route to the M4 motorway (junction 17) 21 miles to the north. A controversial Westbury Bypass was once proposed which would have reduced traffic in parts of the town but would have had a negative effect on the landscape on the east of the town. The eastern bypass scheme was eventually rejected after an Independent Planning Inquiry recommended against it in 2009.

=== Rail ===
The town is an important junction point on the railway network, as it lies at the point where the Reading to Taunton line, forming a link from London Paddington to Penzance, intersects the Wessex Main Line, linking Bristol and Bath Spa to Salisbury, Southampton, Portsmouth and London Waterloo. Westbury railway station is northwest of the town centre. A smaller station, Dilton Marsh, is to the southwest of the town centre between the suburbs of Dilton Marsh and Westbury Leigh; this is a request stop.

== Education ==
Westbury has one secondary school, two primary schools, a junior school and an infants school. The secondary school, Matravers School, has a sixth form offering a range of subjects. It serves Westbury and the surrounding villages including Chapmanslade, Bratton, Dilton Marsh and Edington.

Westbury Leigh C of E Primary School was moved from Westbury Leigh to the neighbouring Leigh Park estate. Bitham Brook Primary School mainly serves the western part of the town. Westbury C of E Junior School serves the central part of the town and takes children from Year 3 to Year 6. It is fed by Westbury Infant School, which takes children from Reception to Year 2.

The closest further education establishment is Wiltshire College's Trowbridge campus, 4½ miles to the north. The college offers daytime adult education lessons at the Westbury Community Project building. The University of Bath is 18 miles to the northwest.

== Religious sites ==
=== Church of England ===
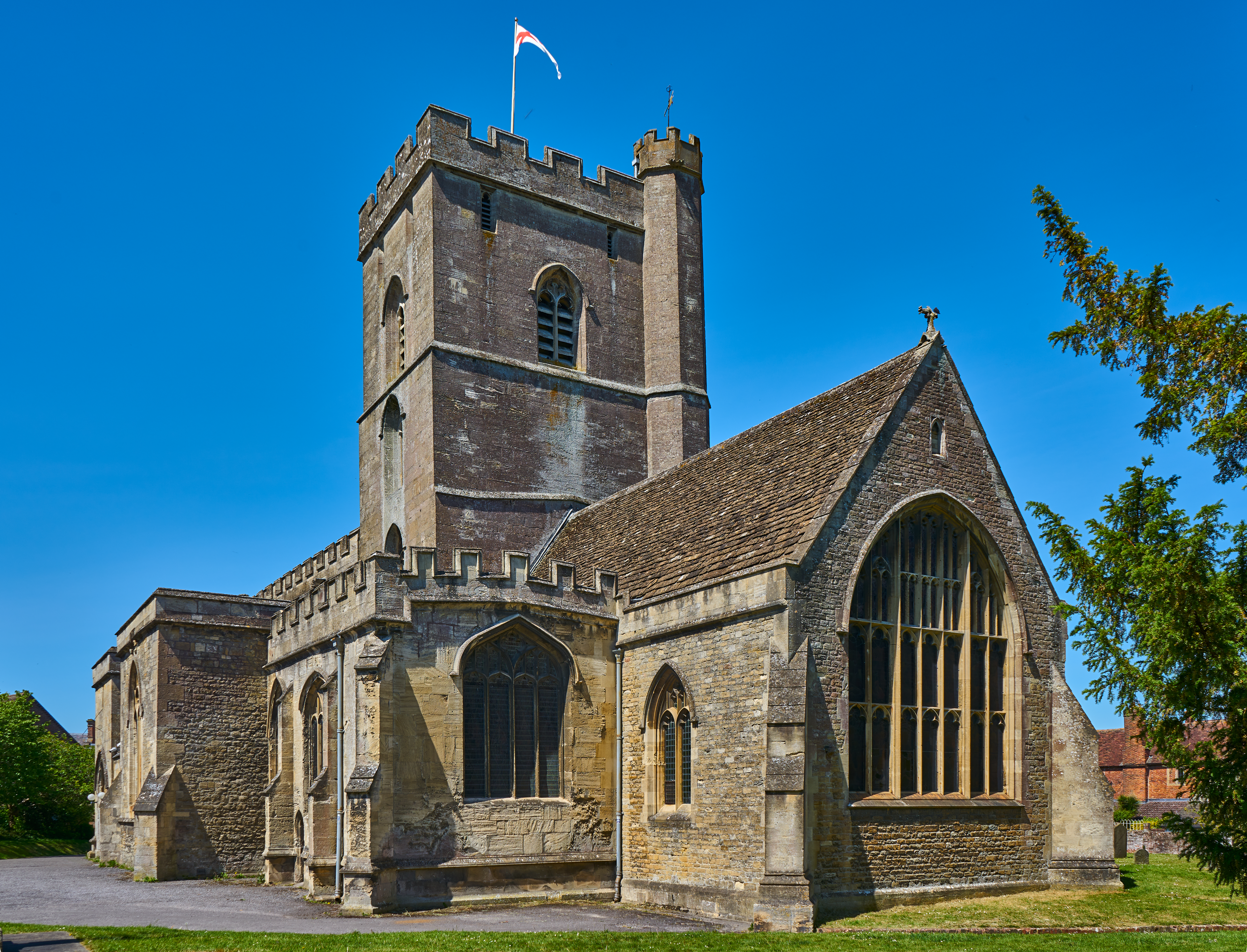
All Saints' Church

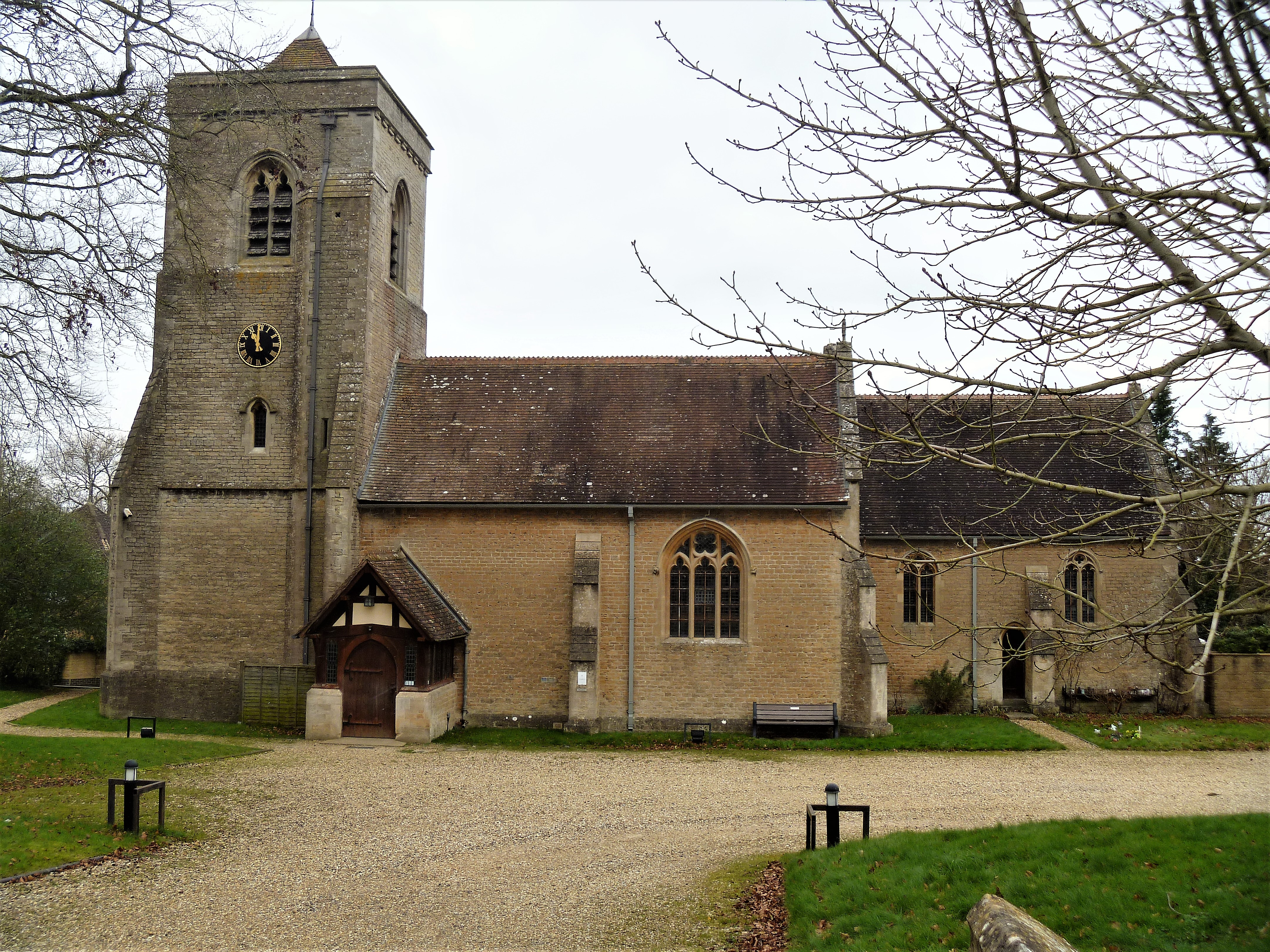
Church of the Holy Saviour, Westbury Leigh

All Saints' Church, now a Grade I listed building, has 14th-century origins but was altered and extended around 1437, then restored in 1847. Although it has a central position near the market-place, surrounding buildings hide it from view except for the central tower.

St Mary's Church, Old Dilton was begun in the 14th century but went out of regular use in 1900 after the population dwindled in that area, southwest of Westbury. The Grade I listed building, which remains consecrated, has been in the care of the Churches Conservation Trust since 1974.

The Church of the Holy Saviour at Westbury Leigh was built as a chapel of ease in 1877, the south aisle added in 1889 and the tower in 1890; all in honey coloured limestone, to designs of the Gothic Revival architect William White. In 2000 the nave was screened off and converted for use as a community hall.

=== Others ===
Nonconformists met in the town from 1662, and built a chapel on Warminster Road soon after 1711, which was rebuilt to suit a congregation of 500 in 1821. It became a United Reformed Church on the foundation of that organisation in 1972.

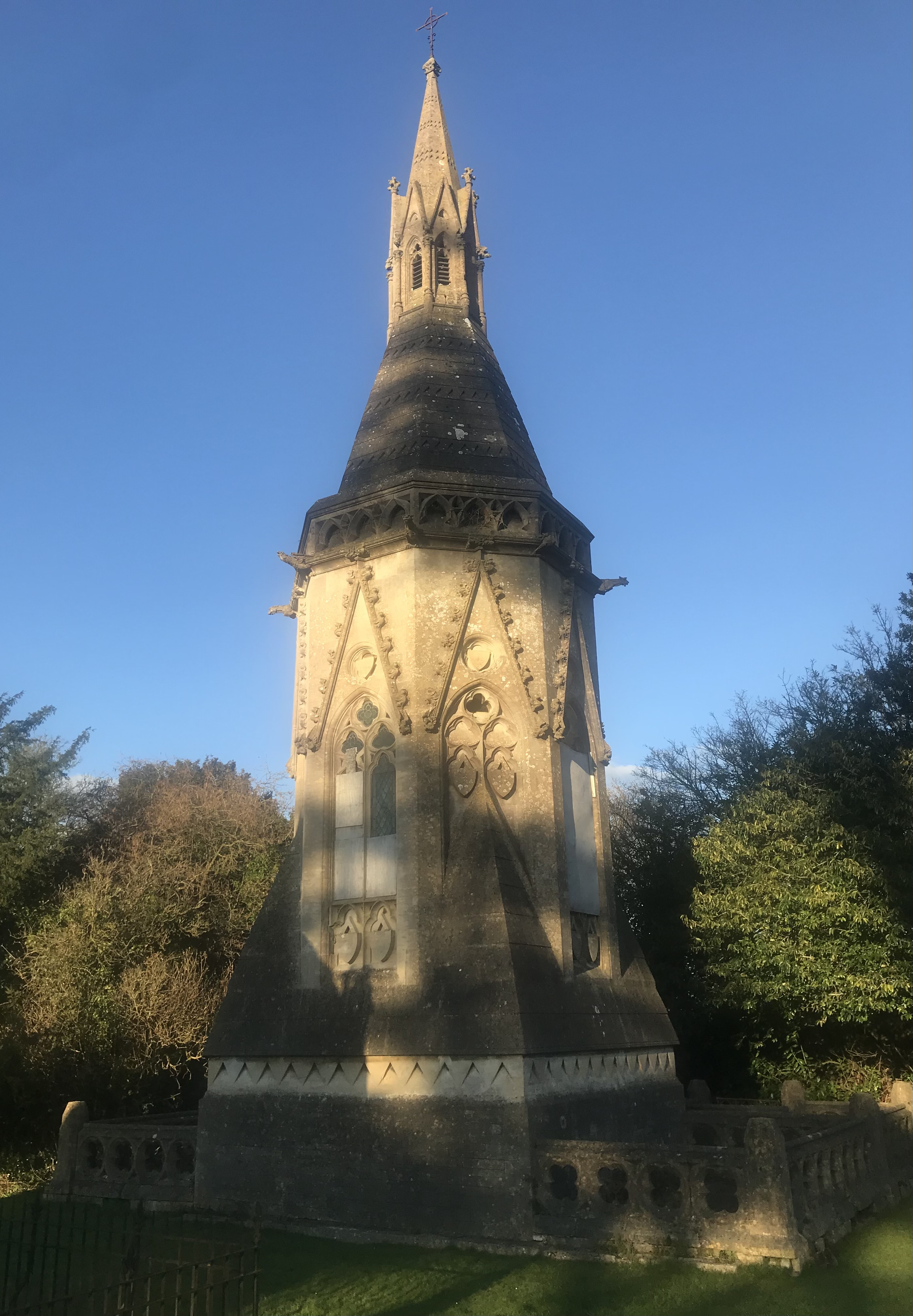
The Phipps Mausoleum

There has been a strong Baptist movement at Westbury Leigh, encouraged by the congregations at Southwick, some 4 miles (6 km) away towards Trowbridge. An early chapel was made from a barn in 1714, and replaced on the same site in 1797 by a chapel with accommodation for 500, built in red brick with stone trimmings. Improved and enlarged in the next century, it is described by Historic England as an "impressive building". In 1810 another chapel was built nearby, at Penknap (then in Westbury, now in Dilton Marsh parish), after a split in the congregation. The earlier chapel fell into disuse sometime before 2019; the Penknap building continues in use as Providence Baptist Church. Later, there was a Baptist congregation in Westbury itself, and in 1868 they rebuilt their West End chapel to seat 350, on the site of a smaller 1820s chapel.

A Methodist church and schoolroom was built in 1926 at the town end of Station Road, replacing a smaller chapel south of Warminster Road, near its junction with Haynes Road, dating from around 1809. It is used as a meeting place and events venue by local organisations.

The Catholic Church of St Bernadette of Lourdes in West End, Westbury was built in 1938. It is now served from St John the Baptist, Trowbridge.

== Sport and leisure ==
Westbury Swimming Pool is one of the oldest Victorian swimming pools still in use in the country. Work started in 1887 by William Laverton, with his wife laying the foundation stone. The pool was built as a gift to the town of Westbury and opened on Thursday 24th May 1888 in celebration and commemoration of Queen Victoria's Jubilee.

Westbury has a Non-League football club, Westbury United, who play at the Meadow Lane ground in the Southern League (English football's eighth tier).

The non-league Rugby Football Club, Westbury RFC, has both male and female teams who play at the White Horse Country Park.

A cricket field at Wellhead Lane was laid out by the mill-owning Lavertons and came to be known as W. H. Laverton's Ground. In 1890 W. G. Grace played in W. H. Laverton's XI against a team called the Australians. Today the ground is home to Westbury & District Cricket Club, and to one side is the Leighton Recreation Centre, run by Places Leisure (part of Places for People) on behalf of Wiltshire Council. providing access to Health and Fitness Suites, Grass Pitches, Squash Courts, Tennis Courts and Grass Cricket Pitches.

== Media ==
Westbury is served by a fortnightly free newspaper, the White Horse News, named after the defining feature on the edge of the town. The newspaper is delivered to all homes in the town and the nearby villages of Bratton, Dilton Marsh and Edington, amongst others. Westbury is also served by the weekly Warminster Journal and Wiltshire Times.

Local news and television programmes are provided by BBC West and ITV West Country. Television signals are received from the Mendip TV transmitter.

Local radio stations are BBC Radio Wiltshire, Heart West, Greatest Hits Radio South West (formerly The Breeze) and Warminster Community Radio (WCR), a community based station which broadcast from Warminster.

== Notable people ==
In order of year of birth:

- William de Westbury (c.1385–1448/49), judge of the King's Bench, built (together with his father) the north chapel of All Saints' church, and endowed it.
- Matthew Ley (1545–1636), and his brother James, owned Brembridge and Heywood; Matthew sat as one of the two MPs for Westbury and James went on to become Lord High Treasurer and Earl of Marlborough.
- John Cogswell (1592–1669), merchant from Westbury Leigh, became a politician after emigrating to North America.
- Thomas Phipps (c.1648–1715), merchant, acquired Dilton manor around 1693 and the Heywood House estate around 1700. A son, William (c.1681–1748), was Governor of Bombay between 1722 and 1729.
- William Phipps's descendants acquired the Leighton estate, and Thomas Henry Hele Phipps built Leighton House in 1800. His grandsons John Lewis Phipps (1801–1870) and Charles Paul Phipps (1815–1880) built a business as coffee merchants importing from Brazil. Charles Paul bought Chalcot House, Westbury, now in Dilton Marsh, and sat as MP for Westbury.
- Bryan Edwards (1743–1800), born in Westbury, inherited plantations in Jamaica and was a supporter of the slave trade.
- Joshua Marshman (1768–1837), was a Baptist missionary to India.
- Rebecca Smith (1807–1849), last British woman executed for infanticide of her own child.
- Abraham Laverton (1819–1889), mill owner and Member of Parliament for Westbury, paid for public buildings in Westbury such as the Laverton Institute, some of them while seeking to be elected.
- George Laverton (1888–1954), cricketer.
- Charles Nicholas Paul Phipps (1845–1913), another coffee merchant and Member of Parliament for Westbury.
- Ruth May Fox (1853–1958), born in Westbury but brought up elsewhere, became a women's rights activist in Utah.
- George William Cornish (1873-1959), Metropolitan Police detective.
- Vernon Bartlett (1894–1983), journalist, author, and independent Member of Parliament.
- Penleigh Boyd (1890–1923), Australian painter.
- Alan Smith (born 1957), bishop of St Albans.

== Sister town ==
Westbury is twinned with Montval-sur-Loir, which is its official sister town in France.

== See also ==
- Baron Westbury
- Baron Grimston of Westbury
- Westbury Ironstone Quarry – a geological Site of Special Scientific Interest
