= Norman Foster (British Army officer) =

British Army officer and Nigerian Army commander

Major-General Norman Foster CB DSO
- Born: 26 August 1909
- Died: 3 January 1995 (aged 85)
- Military career
- Allegiance: United Kingdom
- Branch: British Army
- Service years: 1929–1965
- Rank: Major-General
- Unit: Royal Artillery
- Commands: Nigerian Army
- Conflicts: World War II

Major-General Norman Leslie Foster CB DSO (26 August 1909 – 3 January 1995) was a British Army officer.

After being educated at Westminster School and the Royal Military Academy, Woolwich, Foster was commissioned into the Royal Artillery in 1929. He served with the British Expeditionary Force in the Second World War.

He was general officer commanding (GOC) of the Royal Nigerian Military Forces between 1959 and 1962, then was president of the Regular Commissions Board from 1962 to 1965.

Military offices
Preceded by Maj-Gen Kenneth G. Exham	General Office Commanding (GOC), Royal Nigerian Military Forces; 1959–1962	Succeeded by Maj-Gen John Alexander Mackenzie
