= Westbury (constituency) =

Former parliamentary constituency in the United Kingdom

- Former county constituency for the House of Commons
- Boundary of Westbury in Wiltshire for the 2005 general election

- Location of Wiltshire within England
- County: Wiltshire
- Major settlements: Westbury

1449–2010
- Seats: One (Two 1449–1832)
- Replaced by: South West Wiltshire, Chippenham

Westbury was a parliamentary constituency in Wiltshire from 1449 to 2010. It was represented in the House of Commons of England until 1707, and then in the House of Commons of Great Britain from 1707 to 1800, and finally in the House of Commons of the Parliament of the United Kingdom from 1801 until 2010.

Until 1885, it was a parliamentary borough, returning two Members of Parliament (MPs) until 1832 and only one from 1832 to 1885. The parliamentary borough was abolished in 1885, when the name was transferred to a county constituency returning one MP. Elections used the bloc vote system when two MPs were returned, and the first-past-the-post system of election when one seat was contested.

Westbury returned a Conservative Member at every election after 1924.

== Boundaries ==
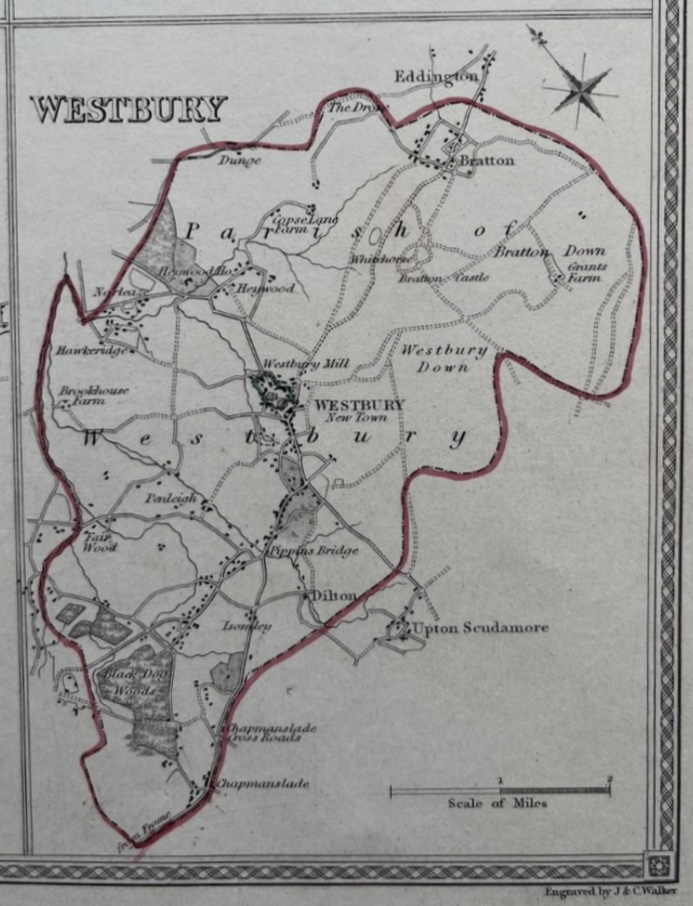
The Westbury borough constituency before 1832, outlined in black, and after the Reform Act, outlined in red, when it included the whole town and the villages within the ancient parish

Originally a small pocket borough, covering only a small part of the parish of Westbury, the Reform Act 1832 expanded it to take in the whole parish, which then included Bratton, Heywood, Dilton Marsh, Dilton, and most of today's Chapmanslade. In 1885, the Westbury parliamentary borough was abolished, and a new county constituency of Westbury was created, with the same name, but covering a much larger area. The boundaries of that changed over the years, until in 2010 the Westbury constituency was abolished and replaced by South-West Wiltshire.

1885–1918: The Sessional Divisions of Bradford-on-Avon, Melksham, Trowbridge, Westbury, and Whorwellsdown, and part of the Sessional Division of Warminster.

1918–1950: The Urban Districts of Bradford-on-Avon, Melksham, Trowbridge, Warminster, and Westbury, and the Rural Districts of Bradford-on-Avon, Melksham, Mere, Warminster, and Westbury with Whorwellsdown.

1950–1974: The Urban Districts of Bradford-on-Avon, Melksham, Trowbridge, Warminster, and Westbury, and the Rural Districts of Bradford-on-Avon and Melksham, Mere and Tisbury, and Warminster and Westbury.

1974–1983: As before but with redrawn boundaries as a result of the Local Government Act 1972.

1983–1997: The District of West Wiltshire, and the District of Salisbury wards of Knoyle, Mere, and Western.

1997–2010: The District of West Wiltshire wards of Adcroft, Bradford-on-Avon North, Bradford-on-Avon South, College, Corsley, Dilton Marsh, Drynham, Ethandune, Holt, John O'Gaunt, Manor Vale, Mid Wylye Valley, Park, Paxcroft, Shearwater, Summerham, Warminster East, Warminster West, Weavers, Westbrook, Westbury with Storridge, and Wylye Valley, and the District of Salisbury wards of Knoyle, Mere, and Western.

Following a review of parliamentary representation in Wiltshire, the Boundary Commission for England created two new constituencies in the county. Chippenham, mostly from the adjoining North Wiltshire, plus the town of Bradford-on-Avon at the northern end of the Westbury constituency, while the rest of Westbury saw minor changes to its composition and was renamed South West Wiltshire. These changes were approved in 2005, to take effect at the following general election, which took place in 2010.

== Members of Parliament ==
=== Westbury borough (before 1885) ===
==== MPs 1449–1640 ====
Parliament	First member	Second member
1491	Sir Thomas Long of Draycot	
1510-1523	No names known	
1529	Thomas Kirton	Thomas Temys
1536	?	
1539	?	
1542	?	
1545	William Hartgill	Geoffrey Carter
1547	John Stokes	Kenelm Throckmorton
1553 (Mar)	?	
1553 (Oct)	Andrew Baynton	Griffin Curteys
1554 (Apr)	Griffin Curteys	Peter Morgan
1554 (Nov)	William Bennett	Griffin Curteys
1555	Sir Thomas Throckmorton	William Hoskins
1558	John Buckland	William Allen Helyer
1559	Anthony Carleton	Ralph Skinner
1562–3	Hugh Ryley	John Dyster
1571	Francis Blount	Thomas Long
1572	William Brouncker	Henry Brouncker
1584	William Brouncker	Edward Midwinter
1586	Robert Baynard	Henry Whitaker
1588	Sir Henry Fanshawe	John Bennett
1593	William Jordyn	Sir Henry Fanshawe
1597	Matthew Ley	James Ley
1601	Matthew Ley	Henry Jackman
1604	Matthew Ley	James Ley
1605	Matthew Ley	Alexander Chocke
1609	Matthew Ley	James Ley
1614	Matthew Ley	Henry Ley
1621	Sir James Ley replaced by Walter Long	Sir Miles Fleetwood
1624	Sir Henry Ley	Sir Henry Mildmay
1625	Sir Walter Long	Gifford Long
1626	Sir Walter Long	Thomas Hopton
1628	Maximilian Petty	Charles Thynne
1629–1640	No Parliaments summoned	

==== MPs 1640–1832 ====
Year	First member	First party	Second member	Second party
April 1640	Sir Thomas Penyston		John Ashe	
November 1640	John Ashe	Parliamentarian	William Wheler	Parliamentarian
December 1648	John Ashe	Parliamentarian	Wheler excluded in Pride's Purge - seat vacant	
1653	Westbury was unrepresented in the Barebones Parliament and the First and Second Parliaments of the Protectorate			
January 1659	Robert Villiers, alias Danvers		William Eyre	
May 1659	Not represented in the restored Rump, Ashe having died in the interim			
April 1660	Richard Lewis		William Brouncker	
1661	Richard Lewis		Thomas Wancklyn	
1678	Richard Lewis		Henry Bertie	
February 1679	Richard Lewis		William Trenchard	
August 1679	Richard Lewis		Henry Bertie	
1680	Edward Norton		William Trenchard	
1681	John Ashe		William Trenchard	
1685	Richard Lewis		James Herbert	
1689	Richard Lewis		Peregrine Bertie	
1695	Richard Lewis		Robert Bertie	
1701	Henry Bertie		Robert Bertie	
July 1702	William Trenchard		Thomas Phipps	
December 1702	Henry Bertie		Robert Bertie	
1708	Henry Bertie		Francis Annesley	
January 1715	Willoughby Bertie		Francis Annesley	
June 1715	The Lord Carbery		Charles Allanson	
1722	James Bertie		Francis Annesley	
March 1723 by-election	The Lord Carbery		Francis Annesley	
1727	John Hoskins Gifford		Francis Annesley	
1734	Hon. George Evans		John Bance	
1741	Hon. George Evans		Joseph Townsend	
1747	John Bance		Paul Methuen	
1748	Chauncy Townsend	Pro-Government	Matthew Michell	
1753 by-election	Chauncy Townsend	Pro-Government	Peregrine Bertie	
1768	William Blackstone		Peregrine Bertie	
1770 by-election	Hon. Charles Dillon		Peregrine Bertie	
1774	Hon. Thomas Wenman		Nathaniel Bayly	
1779 by-election	Hon. Thomas Wenman		Samuel Estwick I	
1780	(Sir) John Whalley-Gardiner		Samuel Estwick I	
1784	Chaloner Arcedeckne		Samuel Estwick I	
1786 by-election	John Madocks		Samuel Estwick I	
1790	Ewan Law		Samuel Estwick I	
January 1795 by-election	Samuel Estwick II		Samuel Estwick I	
November 1795 by-election	Samuel Estwick II		Edward Wilbraham-Bootle	
May 1796	Sir Henry St John-Mildmay, Bt		George Ellis	
October 1796 by-election	Sir Henry St John-Mildmay, Bt		George Harcourt	
1800 by-election	Sir Henry St John-Mildmay, Bt		John Simon Harcourt	
1802	William Baldwin		Charles Smith	
1806	William Jacob		John Woolmore	
May 1807	Edward Lascelles	Tory	Glynn Wynn	Tory
July 1807 by-election	Henry Lascelles	Tory	Glynn Wynn	Tory
1809 by-election	Henry Lascelles	Tory	Francis Whittle	Tory
1810 by-election	Henry Lascelles	Tory	John de Ponthieu	
1812	Benjamin Hall	Whig	Benjamin Shaw	
1814 by-election	Ralph Franco	Tory	Benjamin Shaw	
1818	Ralph Franco	Tory	Lord Francis Conyngham	
1819 by-election	William Leader Maberly	Whig	Lord Francis Conyngham	
March 1820	Jonathan Elford	Tory	Nathaniel Barton	Tory
November 1820 by-election	Sir Manasseh Masseh Lopes, Bt	Tory	Philip John Miles	Tory
1826	Sir Manasseh Masseh Lopes, Bt	Tory	Sir George Warrender	Canningite Tory
1829 by-election	Robert Peel	Tory	Sir George Warrender	Canningite Tory
1830	Sir Alexander Grant, Bt	Tory	Michael Prendergast	Tory
May 1831	Sir Ralph Lopes, Bt	Whig	Henry Hanmer	Tory
July 1831 by-election	Sir Ralph Lopes, Bt	Whig	Henry Frederick Stephenson	Whig
1832	Representation reduced to one MP			

==== MPs 1832–1885 ====
Election	Member	Party
1832	Sir Ralph Lopes	Whig
1837	John Ivatt Briscoe	Whig
1841	Sir Ralph Lopes	Conservative
1847	James Wilson	Whig
1857	Sir Massey Lopes	Conservative
1868	John Lewis Phipps	Conservative
1869 by-election	Charles Paul Phipps	Conservative
1874	Abraham Laverton	Liberal
1880	Charles N. P. Phipps	Conservative
1885	Borough abolished - name transferred to a new county division	

=== Westbury County constituency (1885–2010) ===
Election	Member	Party
1885	George Fuller	Liberal
1895	Richard Chaloner	Conservative
1900	John Fuller	Liberal
1911 by-election	Hon. Geoffrey Howard	Liberal
1918	George Palmer	Coalition Conservative
1922	Charles Darbishire	Liberal
1924	Captain W. W. Shaw	Conservative
1927 by-election	Richard Long	Conservative
1931	Sir Robert Grimston	Conservative
1964	Sir Dennis Walters	Conservative
1992	David Faber	Conservative
2001	Andrew Murrison	Conservative
2010	Constituency abolished: see South West Wiltshire and Chippenham	

== Elections ==
=== Elections in the 1830s ===
General election 1830: Westbury
Party	Candidate	Votes	%
Tory	Alexander Grant	Unopposed	
Tory	Michael Prendergast	Unopposed	
Tory hold			
Tory hold			

General election 1831: Westbury
Party	Candidate	Votes	%
Tory	Henry Hanmer	Unopposed	
Whig	Ralph Lopes	Unopposed	
Tory hold			
Whig gain from Tory			

Hanmer resigned, causing a by-election.

By-election, 15 July 1831: Westbury
Party	Candidate	Votes	%
Whig	Henry Frederick Stephenson (MP)	Unopposed	
Whig gain from Tory			

General election 1832: Westbury
Party	Candidate	Votes	%
Whig	Ralph Lopes	Unopposed	
Registered electors		185	
Whig hold			

General election 1835: Westbury
Party	Candidate	Votes	%
Whig	Ralph Lopes	Unopposed	
Registered electors		192	
Whig hold			

General election 1837: Westbury
Party	Candidate	Votes	%
Whig	John Ivatt Briscoe	98	50.5
Conservative	Ralph Lopes	96	49.5
Majority		2	1.0
Turnout		194	91.1
Registered electors		213	
Whig hold			

=== Elections in the 1840s ===
General election 1841: Westbury
Party	Candidate	Votes	%	±%
Conservative	Ralph Lopes	Unopposed		
Registered electors		291		
Conservative gain from Whig				

General election 1847: Westbury
Party	Candidate	Votes	%	±%
Whig	James Wilson	170	53.3	New
Conservative	Matthew Higgins	149	46.7	N/A
Majority		21	6.6	N/A
Turnout		319	93.3	N/A
Registered electors		342		
Whig gain from Conservative		Swing	N/A	

=== Elections in the 1850s ===
General election 1852: Westbury
Party	Candidate	Votes	%	±%
Whig	James Wilson	145	51.2	−2.1
Conservative	Massey Lopes	138	48.8	+2.1
Majority		7	2.4	−4.2
Turnout		283	90.1	−3.2
Registered electors		314		
Whig hold		Swing	−2.1	

General election 1857: Westbury
Party	Candidate	Votes	%	±%
Conservative	Massey Lopes	Unopposed		
Registered electors		342		
Conservative gain from Whig				

General election 1859: Westbury
Party	Candidate	Votes	%	±%
Conservative	Massey Lopes	Unopposed		
Registered electors		328		
Conservative hold				

=== Elections in the 1860s ===
General election 1865: Westbury
Party	Candidate	Votes	%	±%
Conservative	Massey Lopes	Unopposed		
Registered electors		300		
Conservative hold				

General election 1868: Westbury
Party	Candidate	Votes	%	±%
Conservative	John Lewis Phipps	492	51.4	N/A
Liberal	Abraham Laverton	465	48.6	New
Majority		27	2.8	N/A
Turnout		957	91.5	N/A
Registered electors		1,046		
Conservative hold		Swing	N/A	

The 1868 election was declared void on petition, due to intimidation of the electorate, causing a by-election.

By-election, 27 February 1869: Westbury
Party	Candidate	Votes	%	±%
Conservative	Charles Paul Phipps	499	50.6	−0.8
Liberal	Abraham Laverton	488	49.4	+0.8
Majority		11	1.2	−1.6
Turnout		987	94.4	+2.9
Registered electors		1,046		
Conservative hold		Swing	−0.8	

=== Elections in the 1870s ===
General election 1874: Westbury
Party	Candidate	Votes	%	±%
Liberal	Abraham Laverton	540	51.0	+2.4
Conservative	Charles Paul Phipps	518	49.0	−2.4
Majority		22	2.0	N/A
Turnout		1,058	94.2	+2.7
Registered electors		1,123		
Liberal gain from Conservative		Swing	+2.4	

=== Elections in the 1880s ===
General election 1880: Westbury
Party	Candidate	Votes	%	±%
Conservative	Charles N. P. Phipps	559	52.5	+3.5
Liberal	Abraham Laverton	505	47.5	−3.5
Majority		54	5.0	N/A
Turnout		1,064	94.6	+0.4
Registered electors		1,125		
Conservative gain from Liberal		Swing	+3.5	

General election 1885: Westbury
Party	Candidate	Votes	%	±%
Liberal	George Fuller	5,333	59.4	+11.9
Conservative	Henry Thynne	3,639	40.6	−11.9
Majority		1,694	18.8	N/A
Turnout		8,972	84.9	−9.7
Registered electors		10,566		
Liberal gain from Conservative		Swing	+11.9	

General election 1886: Westbury
Party	Candidate	Votes	%	±%
Liberal	George Fuller	4,663	56.0	−3.4
Liberal Unionist	Thomas George Palmer Hallett	3,670	44.0	+3.4
Majority		993	12.0	−6.8
Turnout		8,333	78.9	−6.0
Registered electors		10,566		
Liberal hold		Swing	−3.4	

=== Elections in the 1890s ===
General election 1892: Westbury
Party	Candidate	Votes	%	±%
Liberal	George Fuller	4,554	53.7	−2.3
Conservative	William Henry Laverton	3,930	46.3	+2.3
Majority		624	7.4	−4.6
Turnout		8,484	77.2	−1.7
Registered electors		10,989		
Liberal hold		Swing	−2.3	

General election 1895: Westbury
Party	Candidate	Votes	%	±%
Conservative	Richard Chaloner	4,497	50.9	+4.6
Liberal	George Fuller	4,331	49.1	−4.6
Majority		166	1.8	N/A
Turnout		8,828	90.3	+13.1
Registered electors		9,777		
Conservative gain from Liberal		Swing	+4.6	

=== Elections in the 1900s ===
John Fuller

General election 1900: Westbury
Party	Candidate	Votes	%	±%
Liberal	John Fuller	4,520	53.3	+4.2
Conservative	Richard Chaloner	3,961	46.7	−4.2
Majority		559	6.6	N/A
Turnout		8,481	86.7	−3.6
Registered electors		9,782		
Liberal gain from Conservative		Swing	+4.2	

General election 1906: Westbury
Party	Candidate	Votes	%	±%
Liberal	John Fuller	5,264	58.2	+4.9
Conservative	Edward Plunkett, Lord Dunsany	3,788	41.8	−4.9
Majority		1,476	16.4	+9.8
Turnout		9,052	89.4	+2.7
Registered electors		10,130		
Liberal hold		Swing	+4.9	

By-election, 1906: Westbury
Party	Candidate	Votes	%	±%
Liberal	John Fuller	Unopposed		
Liberal hold				

=== Elections in the 1910s ===
General election January 1910: Westbury
Party	Candidate	Votes	%	±%
Liberal	John Fuller	5,187	53.9	−4.3
Conservative	R. C. C. Long	4,433	46.1	+4.3
Majority		754	7.8	−8.6
Turnout		9,620	92.4	+3.0
Registered electors		10,411		
Liberal hold		Swing	−4.3	

General election December 1910: Westbury
Party	Candidate	Votes	%	±%
Liberal	John Fuller	5,041	54.8	+0.9
Conservative	George Palmer	4,152	45.2	−0.9
Majority		889	9.6	+1.8
Turnout		9,193	88.3	−4.1
Registered electors		10,411		
Liberal hold		Swing	+0.9	

Geoffrey Howard

1911 Westbury by-election
Party	Candidate	Votes	%	±%
Liberal	Geoffrey Howard	5,073	53.0	−1.8
Conservative	George Palmer	4,492	47.0	+1.8
Majority		581	6.0	−3.6
Turnout		9,565	90.1	+1.8
Registered electors		10,612		
Liberal hold		Swing	−1.8	

General Election 1914–15

Another General Election was required to take place before the end of 1915. The political parties had been making preparations for an election to take place and by July 1914, the following candidates had been selected;

- Liberal Party: Geoffrey Howard
- Unionist Party:George Palmer

General election 14 December 1918: Westbury
Party		Candidate	Votes	%	±%
C	Unionist	George Palmer	9,261	49.1	+3.9
	Liberal	Geoffrey Howard	6,064	32.1	−22.7
	Labour	Ernest Bennett	3,537	18.8	New
Majority			3,197	17.0	N/A
Turnout			18,862	64.6	−23.7
	Unionist gain from Liberal		Swing	+13.3	
C indicates candidate endorsed by the coalition government.

=== Elections in the 1920s ===
C. Darbishire

General election 1922: Westbury
Party	Candidate	Votes	%	±%
Liberal	Charles Darbishire	9,903	41.7	+9.6
Unionist	George Palmer	9,262	39.0	−10.1
Labour	George Ward	4,572	19.3	+0.5
Majority		641	2.7	N/A
Turnout		23,737	81.0	+16.4
Liberal gain from Unionist		Swing		

General election 1923: Westbury
Party	Candidate	Votes	%	±%
Liberal	Charles Darbishire	10,867	43.2	+1.5
Unionist	Walter William Shaw	9,891	39.4	+0.4
Labour	George Ward	4,372	17.4	−1.9
Majority		976	3.8	+1.1
Turnout		25,130	83.5	+2.5
Liberal hold		Swing	+0.6	

General election 1924: Westbury
Party	Candidate	Votes	%	±%
Unionist	Walter William Shaw	11,559	44.2	+4.8
Liberal	Charles Darbishire	9,848	37.7	−5.5
Labour	George Ward	4,731	18.1	+0.7
Majority		1,711	6.5	N/A
Turnout		26,138	84.9	+1.4
Unionist gain from Liberal		Swing		

1927 Westbury by-election
Party	Candidate	Votes	%	±%
Unionist	Richard Long	10,623	40.1	−4.1
Liberal	Harcourt Johnstone	10,474	39.5	+1.8
Labour	George Ward	5,396	20.4	+2.3
Majority		149	0.6	−5.9
Turnout		26,493	84.6	−0.3
Unionist hold		Swing		

General election 1929: Westbury
Party	Candidate	Votes	%	±%
Unionist	Richard Long	12,907	38.8	−1.3
Liberal	Harcourt Johnstone	12,840	38.7	−0.8
Labour	George Ward	7,458	22.5	+2.1
Majority		67	0.1	−0.5
Turnout		33,205	87.1	+2.5
Unionist hold		Swing	-0.3	

=== Elections in the 1930s ===
General election 1931: Westbury
Party	Candidate	Votes	%	±%
Conservative	Robert Grimston	16,949	51.2	+12.4
Liberal	John Hobbis Harris	11,014	33.3	−5.4
Labour	Maurice Hackett	5,127	15.5	−7.0
Majority		5,935	17.9	+17.8
Turnout		33,090	85.4	−1.7
Conservative hold		Swing	+8.9	

General election 1935: Westbury
Party	Candidate	Votes	%	±%
Conservative	Robert Grimston	15,804	49.0	−2.2
Liberal	Charles Byers	10,789	33.5	+0.2
Labour	R. St John Reade	5,641	17.5	+2.0
Majority		5,015	15.5	−2.4
Turnout		32,234	80.1	−5.3
Conservative hold		Swing	-1.2	

General Election 1939–40

Another General Election was required to take place before the end of 1940. The political parties had been making preparations for an election to take place and by the Autumn of 1939, the following candidates had been selected;

- Conservative: Robert Grimston
- Liberal: Harcourt Johnstone
- Labour: George Ward

=== Elections in the 1940s ===
1945 general election: Westbury
Party	Candidate	Votes	%	±%
Conservative	Robert Grimston	14,328	39.0	−10.0
Labour	George Ward	13,397	36.5	+19.0
Liberal	Walter Geoffrey Milne	9,004	24.5	−9.0
Majority		931	2.5	−13.0
Turnout		36,729	75.5	−4.6
Conservative hold		Swing	-14.5	

=== Elections in the 1950s ===
General election 1950: Westbury
Party	Candidate	Votes	%	±%
Conservative	Robert Grimston	17,445	39.5	+0.5
Labour	Reginald James Travess	15,766	35.6	−0.9
Liberal	Harold Banning Richardson	11,031	24.9	+0.4
Majority		1,679	3.9	+1.4
Turnout		44,242	86.3	+10.8
Conservative hold		Swing		

General election 1951: Westbury
Party	Candidate	Votes	%	±%
Conservative	Robert Grimston	19,654	43.7	+4.2
Labour	Reginald James Travess	17,623	39.2	+3.6
Liberal	Harold Banning Richardson	7,666	17.1	−7.8
Majority		2,031	4.5	+0.6
Turnout		44,943	86.2	−0.1
Conservative hold		Swing		

General election 1955: Westbury
Party	Candidate	Votes	%	±%
Conservative	Robert Grimston	19,684	45.6	+1.9
Labour	Reginald James Travess	16,295	37.8	−1.4
Liberal	Peter Leslie Martin Hurd	7,165	16.6	−0.5
Majority		3,389	7.8	+3.3
Turnout		43,144	82.4	−3.8
Conservative hold		Swing		

General election 1959: Westbury
Party	Candidate	Votes	%	±%
Conservative	Robert Grimston	20,396	45.6	0.0
Labour	Jasper Ridley	14,570	32.5	−5.3
Liberal	Basil Wigoder	9,816	21.9	+5.3
Majority		5,826	13.1	+5.3
Turnout		44,782	84.1	+1.7
Conservative hold		Swing		

=== Elections in the 1960s ===
General election 1964: Westbury
Party	Candidate	Votes	%	±%
Conservative	Dennis Walters	19,950	43.1	−2.5
Labour	Philip William Hopkins	15,049	32.6	+0.1
Liberal	Basil Wigoder	11,232	24.3	+2.4
Majority		4,901	10.5	−2.6
Turnout		46,231	82.8	−1.3
Conservative hold		Swing		

General election 1966: Westbury
Party	Candidate	Votes	%	±%
Conservative	Dennis Walters	20,989	43.6	+0.5
Labour	Philip William Hopkins	18,192	37.8	+5.2
Liberal	Iain Meiklejohn Fowler	8,962	18.6	−5.7
Majority		2,797	5.8	−4.7
Turnout		48,143	82.5	−0.3
Conservative hold		Swing		

=== Elections in the 1970s ===
General election 1970: Westbury
Party	Candidate	Votes	%	±%
Conservative	Dennis Walters	26,524	50.3	+6.7
Labour	John McLaren	17,413	33.0	−4.8
Liberal	Robert George Otter	8,781	16.7	−1.9
Majority		9,111	17.3	+11.5
Turnout		52,718	77.0	−5.5
Conservative hold		Swing		

General election February 1974: Westbury
Party	Candidate	Votes	%	±%
Conservative	Dennis Walters	26,197	43.0	−7.3
Liberal	A. W. Glyn Court	17,778	29.2	+12.5
Labour	Anthony J. Smith	16,453	27.0	−6.0
Wessex Regionalists	Viscount Weymouth	521	0.8	New
Majority		8,419	13.8	−3.5
Turnout		60,949	83.5	+6.5
Conservative hold		Swing		

General election October 1974: Westbury
Party	Candidate	Votes	%	±%
Conservative	Dennis Walters	24,172	41.7	−1.3
Liberal	A. W. Glyn Court	18,129	31.3	+2.1
Labour	Anthony J. Smith	15,613	27.0	0.0
Majority		6,043	10.4	−3.4
Turnout		57,914	78.7	−4.7
Conservative hold		Swing		

General election 1979: Westbury
Party	Candidate	Votes	%	±%
Conservative	Dennis Walters	29,929	47.2	+5.5
Liberal	P. Jackson	15,950	25.1	−6.2
Labour	P. R. Atkins	12,532	19.8	−7.2
Independent	S. Alexander	2,547	4.0	New
Wessex Regionalists	Tom Thatcher	1,905	3.0	New
Ecology	Sally Rodwell	554	0.9	New
Majority		13,979	22.1	+11.7
Turnout		63,417	79.7	+1.0
Conservative hold		Swing		

=== Elections in the 1980s ===
General election 1983: Westbury
Party	Candidate	Votes	%	±%
Conservative	Dennis Walters	31,133	51.4	
Liberal	David J. Hughes	22,627	37.4	
Labour	Haydn W. Thomas	6,058	10.0	
Ecology	Paul W. Ekins	609	1.0	
Wessex Regionalists	John C. Banks	131	0.2	
Majority		8,506	14.0	
Turnout		60,558	75.5	
Conservative hold		Swing		

General election 1987: Westbury
Party	Candidate	Votes	%	±%
Conservative	Dennis Walters	34,256	51.6	+0.2
Liberal	David J. Hughes	24,159	36.4	−1.0
Labour	Haydn W. Thomas	7,982	12.0	+2.0
Majority		10,097	15.2	+1.2
Turnout		66,397	78.2	+2.73
Registered electors		84,860		
Conservative hold		Swing	+0.1	

=== Elections in the 1990s ===
General election 1992: Westbury
Party	Candidate	Votes	%	±%
Conservative	David Faber	36,568	50.4	−1.2
Liberal Democrats	Vivienne A. Rayner	23,950	33.0	−3.4
Labour	William Stallard	9,642	13.3	+1.3
Liberal	Paul I. Macdonald	1,440	2.0	New
Green	Patrick R. French	888	1.2	New
Majority		12,618	17.4	+2.2
Turnout		72,488	82.8	+4.6
Registered electors		87,356		
Conservative hold		Swing	+1.1	

General election 1997: Westbury
Party	Candidate	Votes	%	±%
Conservative	David Faber	23,037	40.6	−9.8
Liberal Democrats	John Miller	16,969	29.9	−3.1
Labour	Kevin Small	11,969	21.1	+7.8
Liberal	George Hawkins	1,956	3.4	+1.4
Referendum	Nick Hawkings-Byass	1,909	3.4	New
UKIP	R. Westbury	771	1.4	New
Natural Law	Colin Haysom	140	0.2	New
Majority		6,068	10.7	−6.7
Turnout		56,751	76.2	−6.6
Registered electors		74,457		
Conservative hold		Swing	3.4	

=== Elections in the 2000s ===
General election 2001: Westbury
Party	Candidate	Votes	%	±%
Conservative	Andrew Murrison	21,299	42.1	+1.5
Liberal Democrats	David Vigar	16,005	31.6	+1.7
Labour	Sarah Cardy	10,847	21.4	+0.3
UKIP	Charles Booth-James	1,261	2.5	+1.1
Green	Bob Gledhill	1,216	2.4	New
Majority		5,294	10.5	−0.2
Turnout		50,628	66.6	−9.6
Registered electors		76,056		
Conservative hold		Swing	+0.1	

General election 2005: Westbury
Party	Candidate	Votes	%	±%
Conservative	Andrew Murrison	24,749	44.5	+2.4
Liberal Democrats	Duncan Hames	19,400	34.9	+3.3
Labour	Paul Gibby	9,640	17.3	−4.1
UKIP	Lincoln Williams	1,815	3.3	+0.8
Majority		5,346	9.6	−0.9
Turnout		55,604	67.0	+0.4
Registered electors		82,380		
Conservative hold		Swing	+0.4	

== Notes and references ==
Craig, F. W. S. (1983). British parliamentary election results 1918-1949 (3 ed.). Chichester: Parliamentary Research Services. ISBN 0-900178-06-X.

== Sources ==
- Guardian Unlimited (2004). Ask Aristotle - Westbury. Retrieved 16 November 2004.
- D Brunton & D H Pennington, Members of the Long Parliament (London: George Allen & Unwin, 1954)
- "Cobbett's Parliamentary history of England, from the Norman Conquest in 1066 to the year 1803" (London: Thomas Hansard, 1808)
