= Abraham Laverton =

English cloth mill owner and politician

Member of Parliament for Westbury
- In office February 1874 – April 1880
- Preceded by: Charles Paul Phipps
- Succeeded by: Charles Nicholas Paul Phipps

Personal details
- Born: 1819
- Died: 1886 (aged 66–67)
- Party: Liberal
- Occupation: Cloth mill owner

Abraham Laverton (3 October 1819 – 31 October 1886), of Westbury, Wiltshire, was an English cloth mill owner, Liberal Member of Parliament for the parliamentary borough of Westbury from 1874 to 1880, and philanthropist.

== Early life ==
Born in Trowbridge in 1819, and baptized into the Church of England on 9 October, Laverton was one of the four sons of William Laverton, a master weaver, and his wife Penelope Davis, who had married in Trowbridge in October 1803. Laverton grew up there in Newtown. Apart from three brothers, he also had a sister, Charlotte. In March 1825 his mother died, aged 41.

As well as being a weaver, Laverton's father was a contractor with clothiers, sharing his contracts with other weavers. The Laverton children had some education, but in their youth they also worked as weavers. Abraham gained a job in the counting house of Court Mill, Trowbridge, before moving to Sheppards Mill, Frome, where he worked in sales and made contacts useful in his later career.

William Laverton, of Newtown, Trowbridge, died in October 1842, leaving property valued at less than £200.

== Mill owner ==
In 1849, Laverton leased the Angel Mill, Westbury, from the trustees of William Matravers and converted it to produce cloth. In 1852 he bought the mill, while in the same year James Wilson, the Whig Member of Parliament for Westbury, and his brother William bought Bitham Mill in the same town. In 1856, the Wilson brothers sold their mill to Laverton. For a time in the middle of the century he also owned Boyer's Mill, Westbury. As well as being a manufacturer, Laverton was a speculative buyer of cloth and wool.

== Politician ==
In February 1860, Laverton became a Justice of the Peace for Wiltshire. In 1864, a dispute arose between him and Charles Paul Phipps as to their seniority as magistrates.

In 1866, he was named as an additional Commissioner "for executing the Acts for granting a Land Tax and other Rates and Taxes", when he was described as "Abraham Laverton Esquire, Westbury House, Westbury". In the same year, he was elected as Mayor of Westbury, heading the corporation of the borough.

At the general election of November 1868, Laverton stood unsuccessfully for parliament in Westbury as a Liberal, against the Conservative John Lewis Phipps, of Leighton House, Westbury, losing by 27 votes. Although Phipps was elected, the result was declared void as a result of an election petition brought by Laverton. Mr Justice Willes found that although Phipps was personally innocent of any corrupt practice, his agent, Harrop, had carried out acts of intimidation on voters. The Judge found that Harrop, who was a manufacturer in Westbury, "had told his workmen that no man should remain in his employment who voted for the Petitioner, who was his rival in trade, and that these men or some of them were obliged to leave his employment in consequence of their refusing to abstain from so voting". A by-election was thus held in 1869 to fill the vacancy, at which Laverton lost by eleven votes, defeated by his rival's brother, Charles Paul Phipps, standing for the Conservatives.

Voting in England was by a show of hands at a hustings, until the Ballot Act 1872 introduced secret ballots. At the 1874 election, Laverton was finally elected as the borough's Member of Parliament, but there is no record that he ever spoke in the House of Commons.

In 1874, a poem called Warblings from Westbury was published, poking fun at Laverton in his new role as Member of Parliament. In the same year, he printed a circular to the shareholders of the Manchester, Sheffield and Lincolnshire Railway offering himself to them as a director.

In 1875, A. B. Thom's The Upper Ten Thousand noted that Laverton was living in Westbury at Westfield House, now on Bratton Road. He is described as –

Laverton, Abraham, a cloth manufacturer at Westbury, a magistrate for Wilts, a director of the Westbury iron company, a director of the Manchester and Sheffield Railway, M. P. (L.) Westbury from 1874.

Laverton was defeated at the 1880 election by Charles Phipps's son, Charles N. P. Phipps. Following this defeat, he filed a petition in the High Court to have the result of the election annulled on the grounds of bribery, treating, and undue influence on the part of his Conservative opponent. This failed, rejected by Sir Robert Lush and Sir Henry Manisty, two Justices.

== Public works ==
In 1869, shortly after his second election defeat, Laverton built Prospect Square, Westbury, a development of 39 houses, of which 32 were for his mill workers and seven were almshouses, around three sides of a large open space which before that had been used as allotments. Some of these houses are now listed buildings.

In 1873, the year before his election success, Laverton founded and built the Laverton Institute in Bratton Road, Westbury, as a recreational centre; the building continues in use as a community facility, managed by the Town Council. The Institute included a room for a school which already existed, the Westbury Boys' British School, which moved into the new building in 1874 and in 1907 changed its name to the Westbury Laverton Institute School. It remained in the building until 1925, when it was merged into what is now Matravers School.

In 1884, Laverton also built a new school in Bratton Road, near his Institute, and presented it to the town. This opened its doors in 1885 and was known as the Laverton Infants' School, then the Laverton County Infants' School, after being adopted by Wiltshire County Council. In 1958, it moved into premises in the churchyard, the former Church of England Junior School, and in 1968 moved again to Eden Vale, becoming the Westbury Infants' School. The original building in Bratton Road is now a private house.

The great west window of Westbury's All Saints' parish church was donated by Abraham Laverton.

Laverton is sometimes stated as the founder of the public baths in Church Street, Westbury. While these were his conception, they were completed and given to the town in 1887, shortly after his death, by his nephew William Henry Laverton.

== Death and legacy ==
Laverton died on 31 October 1886 at Farleigh Castle, Farleigh Hungerford, leaving a personal estate valued for probate at £647,416, equivalent to £72,754,918 in 2025.

A lifelong bachelor who lived his whole adult life with his sister Charlotte, Laverton was succeeded by a nephew, William Henry Laverton, who continued the firm he had founded, A. Laverton & Co. Ltd. This was still making cloth in Westbury in the Angel and Bitham Mills in the 1960s.

Laverton's sister Charlotte outlived him, settling at Bradford on Avon and dying there on 21 July 1890.

Parliament of the United Kingdom
Preceded by Charles Paul Phipps	Member of Parliament for Westbury; 1874 – 1880	Succeeded by Charles N. P. Phipps
