= George Palmer (British Army officer) =

British Conservative Party politician and Army officer

Brigadier-General George Palmer CB ED
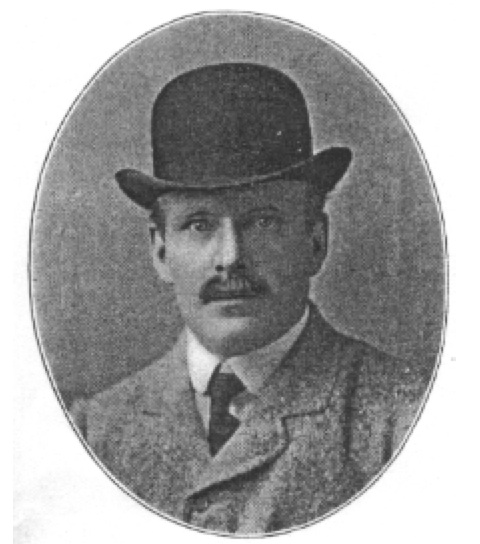
- Photograph of Palmer, Wiltshire Times and Trowbridge Advertiser, January 1919
- Born: 12 March 1857
- Died: 31 March 1932 (aged 75)

Brigadier-General George Llewellen Palmer, CB, ED (12 March 1857 – 31 March 1932) was a British Army officer and Conservative Party politician.

Palmer was the eldest son of Michael Palmer of Berryfield Hall, Wiltshire, and his wife Mary Ann, daughter of Joshua Bates of Halifax, Yorkshire. He was educated at Harrow School and abroad.

He married in 1881 Louise Madeleine (30 September 1861 Trowbridge, Wiltshire - 17 May 1925 Bradford on Avon, Wiltshire), daughter of William Gouldsmith of Rodwell Hall, Trowbridge, Wiltshire. The couple had one daughter and three sons, one of whom died on active service in World War I.

In 1903–1904, Palmer was High Sheriff of Wiltshire; at that time he was described as "of Lackham, Lacock".

Palmer was an officer in the Royal Wiltshire Yeomanry, awarded the TD in 1909, and rose to become Lieutenant-Colonel, commanding the regiment from 1910 to 1915. In World War I he commanded the 10th Mounted Brigade from 1915 to 1916 and retired at the rank of honorary Brigadier-General. He was appointed Companion of the Order of the Bath in the 1918 New Year Honours.

At the 1918 general election he was elected as Member of Parliament for Westbury in Wiltshire, having stood as a Coalition Conservative. Palmer had previously fought the Westbury seat unsuccessfully both at the December 1910 general election and at a by-election in 1911, but in 1918 the strength of the "coalition coupon" was enough to wrest the seat by a large margin from the sitting Liberal Party MP Geoffrey Howard.

The Liberals retook Westbury at the 1922 election, and Palmer did not stand for Parliament again. He died in 1932 aged 75.

Parliament of the United Kingdom
Preceded by Geoffrey Howard	Member of Parliament for Westbury; 1918–1922	Succeeded by Charles Darbishire
