= John Lewis Phipps =

British politician

John Lewis Phipps (1801–1870)

John Lewis Phipps (1801–1870), of Leighton House, Westbury, Wiltshire, was a merchant trading with Brazil, who was briefly Conservative MP for Westbury (1868) and High Sheriff of Wiltshire (1864).

He was the second son of Thomas Henry Hele Phipps (1777–1841), of Leighton House, Westbury, Wiltshire, and Mary Michael Joseph Leckonby (1777–1835). In 1837 he went into partnership with his younger brother, Charles Paul Phipps, buying out the Brazilian coffee business of Heyworth Brothers. Despite a number of alarms, the business eventually flourished, becoming for a while one of the largest coffee exporters from Brazil. Phipps was part-owner of a cargo of coffee shipped from Rio de Janeiro in the Amy Warwick, a merchant vessel that was captured by Unionist forces on 10 July 1861, at the outset of the American Civil War. The resulting legal case ended up in the U.S. Supreme Court in 1862.

In 1868, Phipps was elected as the Conservative Member of Parliament (MP) for Westbury, but the election result was declared void as a result of a petition brought by the unsuccessful Liberal Party candidate, Mr Abraham Laverton. Willes J held that, although Phipps himself was personally innocent of any corrupt practice, his agent, Harrop, had carried out acts of intimidation on voters. Phipps had hoped that his son, Richard Leckonby Hothersall Phipps, would succeed him in the seat. His replacement instead by his brother, Charles Paul Phipps, and (after a Liberal interlude, with the short-lived success of Laverton in 1874) by his nephew, Charles Nicholas Paul Phipps, added to family tensions arising from the conduct of the partnership's affairs.

In 1834, Phipps married Mary Anne Barney, by whom he had a son and three daughters. He died in 1870.

== Sources ==
- Notes on the 'Westbury' Phipps Pedigrees, John C. Phipps (1983, unpublished)
- Papers of the Phipps family of Leighton and Chalcot (Ref. 540) at the Wiltshire and Swindon History Centre (National Archives catalogue)

Honorary titles
Preceded by Thomas Grove	High Sheriff of Wiltshire; 1864–1865	Succeeded by Thomas Henry Allen Poynder
Parliament of the United Kingdom
Preceded by Sir Massey Lopes	Member of Parliament for Westbury; 1868 – 1869	Succeeded by Charles Paul Phipps
