= Charles Paul Phipps =

English merchant and politician

Charles Paul Phipps (1815–1880), of Chalcot House, near Westbury, Wiltshire, was an English merchant in Brazil and later Conservative MP for Westbury (1869–1874) and High Sheriff of Wiltshire (1875).

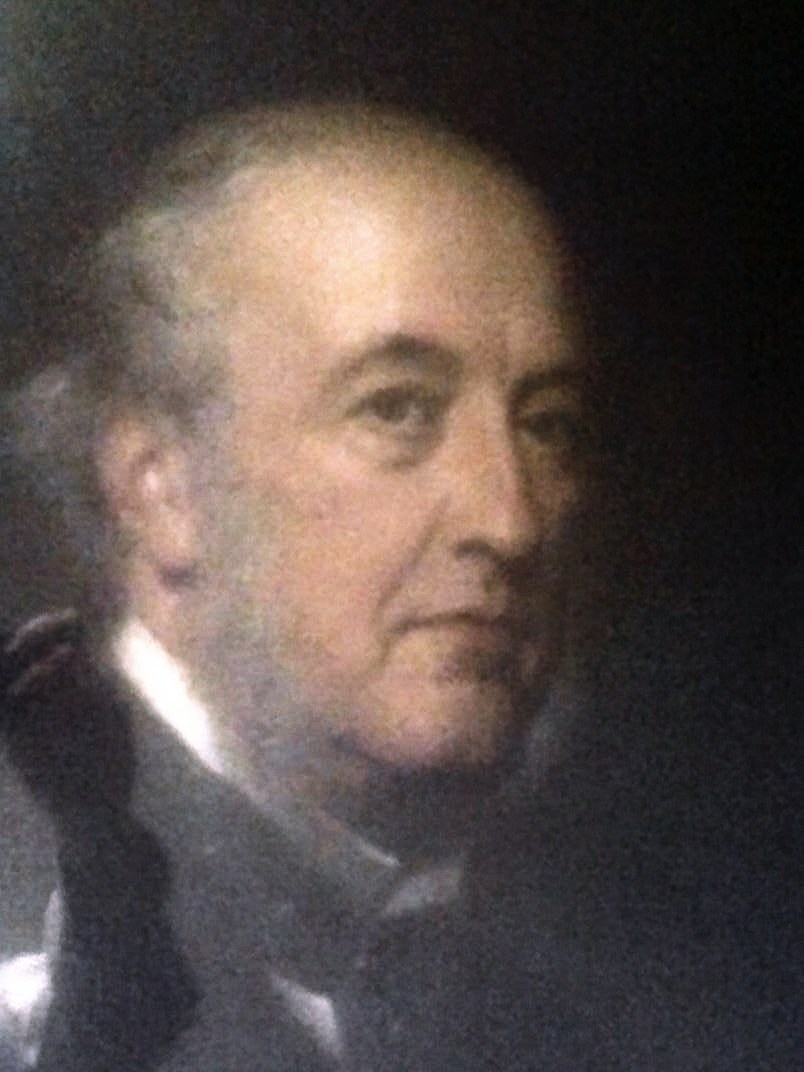
Portrait of Charles Paul Phipps by George Richmond RA

== Origins ==
Charles Paul Phipps was the eighth son of Thomas Henry Hele Phipps (1777–1841), of Leighton House, Westbury, Wiltshire, and Mary Michael Joseph Leckonby (1777–1835). The Phippses had originally emerged as prominent Wiltshire clothiers in the 16th century. Over the next hundred years prosperity propelled them into the ranks of the landed gentry but, by the early 19th century, the family found themselves in reduced financial circumstances.

== Coffee merchant ==
In 1830, at the age of 15, Phipps was sent to Rio de Janeiro with twenty pounds in his pocket to seek his fortune. In 1837 he went into partnership with his older brother, John Lewis Phipps, buying out the Brazilian coffee business of Heyworth Brothers. Despite a number of alarms, the business eventually flourished, becoming for a while one of the largest coffee exporters from Brazil. Between 1850 and the mid-1870s, the volume of coffee exported by the firm increased from 94,000 to about half a million bags per annum (valued at £2,000,000).

== Political career ==
In 1869, Phipps was elected as the Conservative Member of Parliament for Westbury, by 499 votes to 488 for the Liberal candidate, Abraham Laverton. He lost his seat to Laverton in 1874 by 22 votes.

Phipps died on 8 June 1880, having suffered a stroke the previous year.

== Family ==
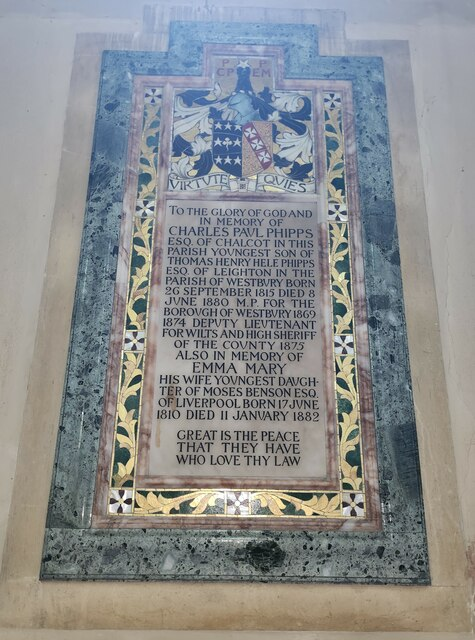
Memorial to Phipps at Holy Trinity Church, Dilton Marsh

In 1844, Phipps married Emma Mary Benson, who came from a mercantile family, being the daughter of Moses Benson of Liverpool and granddaughter of Moses Benson (1738–1806). Their eldest son, Charles Nicholas Paul Phipps, was also subsequently MP for Westbury and High Sheriff of Wiltshire. Their second son, William Wilton Phipps, was the grandfather of both Joyce Grenfell and Simon Wilton Phipps MC, the Bishop of Lincoln.

== Sources ==
- Notes on the 'Westbury' Phipps Pedigrees, John C. Phipps (1983, unpublished)
- Papers of the Phipps family of Leighton and Chalcot (Ref. 540) at the Wiltshire and Swindon History Centre (National Archives catalogue)

Parliament of the United Kingdom
Preceded by John Lewis Phipps	Member of Parliament for Westbury; 1869 – 1874	Succeeded by Abraham Laverton
