= Fuller baronets =

Set index for Fuller baronets

There have been two baronetcies created for persons with the surname Fuller, one in the Baronetage of England and one in the Baronetage of the United Kingdom. As of 2026 one creation is extant.

- Fuller baronets of the Inner Temple (1687)
- Fuller baronets of Neston Park (1910)

== See also ==
- Fuller-Eliott-Drake baronets
- Hood baronets
