= List of schools in Wiltshire =

This is a List of schools in Wiltshire, England.

== State-funded schools ==
=== Primary schools ===
- Alderbury & West Grimstead CE Primary School, Alderbury
- All Cannings CE Primary School, All Cannings
- Aloeric Primary School, Melksham
- Amesbury Archer Primary School, Amesbury
- Amesbury CE Primary School, Amesbury
- Ashton Keynes CE Primary School, Ashton Keynes
- The Avenue Primary School, Warminster
- Baydon St Nicholas CE Primary School, Baydon
- Bellefield Primary School, Trowbridge
- Bemerton St John CE Primary, Bemerton
- Bishops Cannings CE Primary School, Bishops Cannings
- Bitham Brook Primary School, Westbury
- Bowerhill Primary School, Bowerhill
- Box CE Primary School, Box
- Bratton Primary School, Bratton
- Brinkworth Earl Danby's CE Primary, Brinkworth
- Broad Chalke CE Primary School, Broad Chalke
- Broad Hinton CE Primary School, Broad Hinton
- Broad Town CE Primary School, Broad Town
- Bulford St Leonard's CE Primary School, Bulford
- Burbage Primary School, Burbage
- By Brook Valley CE Primary School, Yatton Keynell
- Castle Mead School, Hilperton
- Chapmanslade CE Primary School, Chapmanslade
- Charter Primary School, Chippenham
- Cherhill CE School, Cherhill
- Chilmark and Fonthill Bishop CE Primary School, Chilmark
- Chilton Foliat CE Primary School, Chilton Foliat
- Chirton CE Primary School, Chirton
- Christ Church CE Primary School, Bradford on Avon
- Christ The King RC School, Amesbury
- Christian Malford CE Primary School, Christian Malford
- Churchfields The Village School, Atworth
- Clarendon Infants' School, Tidworth
- Clarendon Junior School, Tidworth
- Colerne CE Primary School, Colerne
- Collingbourne CE Primary School, Collingbourne Ducis
- Coombe Bissett CE Primary School, Coombe Bissett
- Corsham Primary School, Corsham
- The Corsham Regis Primary Academy, Corsham
- Crockerton CE Primary School, Crockerton
- Crudwell CE Primary School, Crudwell
- Dauntsey Academy Primary School, West Lavington
- Derry Hill CE Primary School, Derry Hill
- Dilton Marsh CE Primary School, Dilton Marsh
- Dinton CE Primary School, Dinton
- Downton CE Primary School, Downton
- Durrington All Saints CE Infants' School, Durrington
- Durrington CE Junior School, Durrington
- Easton Royal Academy, Easton Royal
- Fitzmaurice Primary School, Bradford on Avon
- Five Lanes CE Primary School, Worton
- Forest and Sandridge CE Primary School, Sandridge
- Frogwell Primary School, Chippenham
- Fynamore Primary School, Calne
- Gomeldon Primary School, Gomeldon
- Great Bedwyn CE School, Great Bedwyn
- Great Wishford CE Primary School, Great Wishford
- Greentrees Primary School, Salisbury
- The Grove Primary School, Trowbridge
- Harnham CE Junior School, Harnham
- Harnham Infants' School, Harnham
- Heddington CE Primary School, Heddington
- Heytesbury CE Primary School, Heytesbury
- Hilmarton Primary School, Hilmarton
- Hilperton CE Primary School, Hilperton
- Hindon CE Primary School, Hindon
- Holbrook Primary School, Trowbridge
- Holt Primary School, Holt
- Holy Trinity CE Academy, Quemerford
- The Holy Trinity CE Primary Academy, Great Cheverell
- Horningsham Primary School, Horningsham
- Hullavington CE Primary School, Hullavington
- Ivy Lane Primary School, Chippenham
- Keevil CE Academy, Keevil
- Kennet Valley CE Primary School, Lockeridge
- King's Gate Primary School, Amesbury
- King's Lodge Primary School, Chippenham
- Kington St Michael CE Primary School, Kington St Michael
- Kiwi Primary School, Bulford Camp
- Lacock CE Primary School, Lacock
- Langley Fitzurse CE Primary School, Kington Langley
- Larkhill Primary School, Larkhill
- Lea and Garsdon CE Primary School, Lea
- Longford CE Primary School, Britford
- Longleaze Primary School, Royal Wootton Bassett
- Luckington Community School, Luckington
- Ludgershall Castle Primary School, Ludgershall
- Ludwell Community Primary School, Ludwell
- Lydiard Millicent CE Primary School, Lydiard Millicent
- Lyneham Primary School, Lyneham
- Malmesbury CE Primary School, Malmesbury
- The Manor CE Primary School, Melksham
- Manor Fields Primary School, Salisbury
- Marden Vale CE Academy, Calne
- Marlborough St Mary's CE Primary School, Marlborough
- The Mead Community Primary School, Hilperton
- Mere School, Mere
- Minety CE Primary School, Minety
- The Minster CE Primary School, Warminster
- Monkton Park Primary School, Chippenham
- Morgan's Vale and Woodfalls CE Primary School, Redlynch
- Neston Primary School, Neston
- Netheravon All Saints CE Primary School, Netheravon
- New Close Primary School, Warminster
- The New Forest CE Primary School, Nomansland
- Newton Tony CE School, Newton Tony
- Newtown Community Primary School, Trowbridge
- Noremarsh Junior School, Royal Wootton Bassett
- North Bradley CE Primary School, North Bradley
- Nursteed Community Primary School, Devizes
- Oaksey CE Primary School, Oaksey
- Oare CE Primary School, Oare
- Ogbourne CE Primary School, Ogbourne St George
- Old Sarum Primary School, Old Sarum
- Paxcroft Primary School, Trowbridge
- Pembroke Park Primary School, Salisbury
- Pewsey Primary School, Pewsey
- Pitton CE Primary School, Pitton
- Preshute CE Primary School, Manton
- Priestly Primary School, Calne
- Princecroft Primary School, Warminster
- Queen's Crescent School, Chippenham
- Ramsbury Primary School, Ramsbury
- Redland Primary School, Chippenham
- Ridgeway Farm CE Academy, Purton
- River Mead School, Melksham
- Rowde CE Academy, Rowde
- Rushall CE School, Rushall
- St Andrew's CE Primary School, Laverstock
- St Barnabas CE School, Market Lavington
- St Bartholomew's Primary Academy, Royal Wootton Bassett
- St Edmund's RC Primary School, Calne
- St George's CE Primary School, Semington
- St George's RC Primary School, Warminster
- St John's CE School, Warminster
- St John's CE Primary School, Tisbury
- St John's RC Primary School, Trowbridge
- St Joseph's RC Primary School, Devizes
- St Joseph's RC Primary School, Malmesbury
- St Katharine's CE Primary School, Great Bedwyn
- St Mark's CE Junior School, Salisbury
- St Martin's CE Primary School, Salisbury
- St Mary's Broughton Gifford CE Primary School, Broughton Gifford
- St Mary's CE Primary School, Purton
- St Mary's RC Primary School, Chippenham
- St Michael's CE Primary, Aldbourne
- St Michael's CE Primary School, Larkhill
- St Nicholas CE Primary School, Bromham
- St Nicholas CE Primary School, Porton
- St Osmund's RC Primary School, Salisbury
- St Patrick's RC Primary School, Corsham
- St Paul's Primary School, Chippenham
- St Peter's CE Academy, Chippenham
- St Peter's CE Primary Academy, Salisbury
- St Sampson's CE Primary School, Cricklade
- St Thomas à Becket CE Primary School, Tilshead
- Sambourne CE Primary School, Warminster
- Sarum St Pauls CE Primary School, Salisbury
- Seagry CE Primary School, Upper Seagry
- Seend CE Primary School, Seend
- Semley CE Primary School, Semley
- Shalbourne CE Primary School, Shalbourne
- Shaw CE Primary School, Shaw
- Sherston CE Primary School, Sherston
- Shrewton CE Primary Academy, Shrewton
- Somerfords' Walter Powell CE Primary Academy, Great Somerford
- Southbroom Infants' School, Devizes
- Southbroom St James Academy, Devizes
- Southwick CE Primary School, Southwick
- Stanton St Quintin Primary School, Stanton St Quintin
- Staverton CE Primary School, Staverton
- Stratford-sub-Castle CE Primary School, Stratford-sub-Castle
- Studley Green Primary School, Trowbridge
- Sutton Benger CE Primary School, Sutton Benger
- Sutton Veny CE School, Sutton Veny
- The Trinity CE Primary Academy, Devizes
- Urchfont CE Primary School, Urchfont
- Walwayne Court School, Trowbridge
- Wansdyke School, Devizes
- Wardour RC Primary School, Wardour
- Wellington Eagles Primary Academy, Ludgershall
- Wellington Lions Primary Academy, Tidworth
- West Ashton CE Primary School, West Ashton
- Westbury CE Junior School, Westbury
- Westbury Infant School, Westbury
- Westbury Leigh CE Primary School, Westbury
- Westwood-with-Iford Primary School, Lower Westwood
- Willowbrook Primary Academy, Trowbridge
- Whiteparish All Saints CE Primary School, Whiteparish
- Whitesheet CE Primary Academy, Zeals
- Wilton CE Primary School, Wilton
- Winsley CE Primary School, Winsley
- Winterbourne Earls CE Primary School, Winterbourne Earls
- Winterslow CE Primary School, Winterslow
- Woodborough CE Primary School, Woodborough
- Woodford Valley CE Primary Academy, Middle Woodford
- Woodlands Primary School, Salisbury
- Wootton Bassett Infants' School, Royal Wootton Bassett
- Wylye Valley CE Primary School, Codford
- Wyndham Park Infants' School, Salisbury
- Zouch Academy, Tidworth

=== Non-selective secondary schools ===
- Abbeyfield School, Chippenham
- Avon Valley Academy, Durrington
- Bradon Forest School, Purton
- The Clarendon Academy, Trowbridge
- The Corsham School, Corsham
- Devizes School, Devizes
- Hardenhuish School, Chippenham
- The John of Gaunt School, Trowbridge
- Kingdown School, Warminster
- Kingsbury Green Academy, Calne
- Lavington School, Market Lavington
- Malmesbury School, Malmesbury
- Matravers School, Westbury
- Melksham Oak Community School, Melksham
- Pewsey Vale School, Pewsey
- Royal Wootton Bassett Academy, Royal Wootton Bassett
- St Augustine's Catholic College, Trowbridge
- St John's Marlborough, Marlborough
- St Joseph's Catholic School, Laverstock
- St Laurence School, Bradford-on-Avon
- Sarum Academy, Salisbury
- Sheldon School, Chippenham
- The Stonehenge School, Amesbury
- The Trafalgar School at Downton, Downton
- The Wellington Academy, Tidworth
- Wyvern St Edmund's, Laverstock

=== Grammar schools ===
- Bishop Wordsworth's School, Salisbury
- South Wilts Grammar School, Salisbury

=== Special and alternative schools ===
- Downland School, Devizes
- Exeter House School, Salisbury
- Melksham House School, Melksham
- SAIL, Salisbury
- Silverwood School, Rowde
- The Springfields Academy, Calne

=== Further education ===
- Salisbury Sixth Form College, Salisbury
- Wiltshire College, Chippenham, Trowbridge, Salisbury & Lackham

== Independent schools ==
=== Primary and preparatory schools ===
- Avondale Preparatory School, Bulford
- Chafyn Grove School, Salisbury
- Cricklade Manor Prep, Cricklade
- Heywood Prep, Corsham
- Lumiar Stowford School, Wingfield
- St Francis School, Pewsey
- St Margaret's Preparatory School, Calne
- Salisbury Cathedral School, Salisbury
- Sandroyd School, Tollard Royal

=== Senior and all-through schools ===
- Bishopstrow College, Bishopstrow
- Dauntsey's School, West Lavington
- Emmaus School, Staverton
- The Godolphin School, Salisbury
- Leehurst Swan School, Salisbury
- Marlborough College, Marlborough
- OneSchool Global UK, Wilton
- St Mary's School, Calne
- Stonar School, Atworth
- Warminster School, Warminster

=== Special and alternative schools ===
- Appleford School, Shrewton
- Compass Community School Athelstan Park, Westbury
- Compass Community School Wheatley Park, Rodbourne Cheney
- Coombe House School, Donhead St Mary
- The Eaves Learning Centre, Heywood
- Meadow Bridge School, Cricklade
- On Track Education Centre, Westbury
- The Spires, Salisbury
- Brunel College, Salisbury
