= List of oldest schools in Wiltshire =

This is a list of the oldest schools in Wiltshire, England, arranged by their date of foundation. It includes both schools that are still in operation and notable former institutions. Many of these schools originated as medieval or early modern charitable foundations.

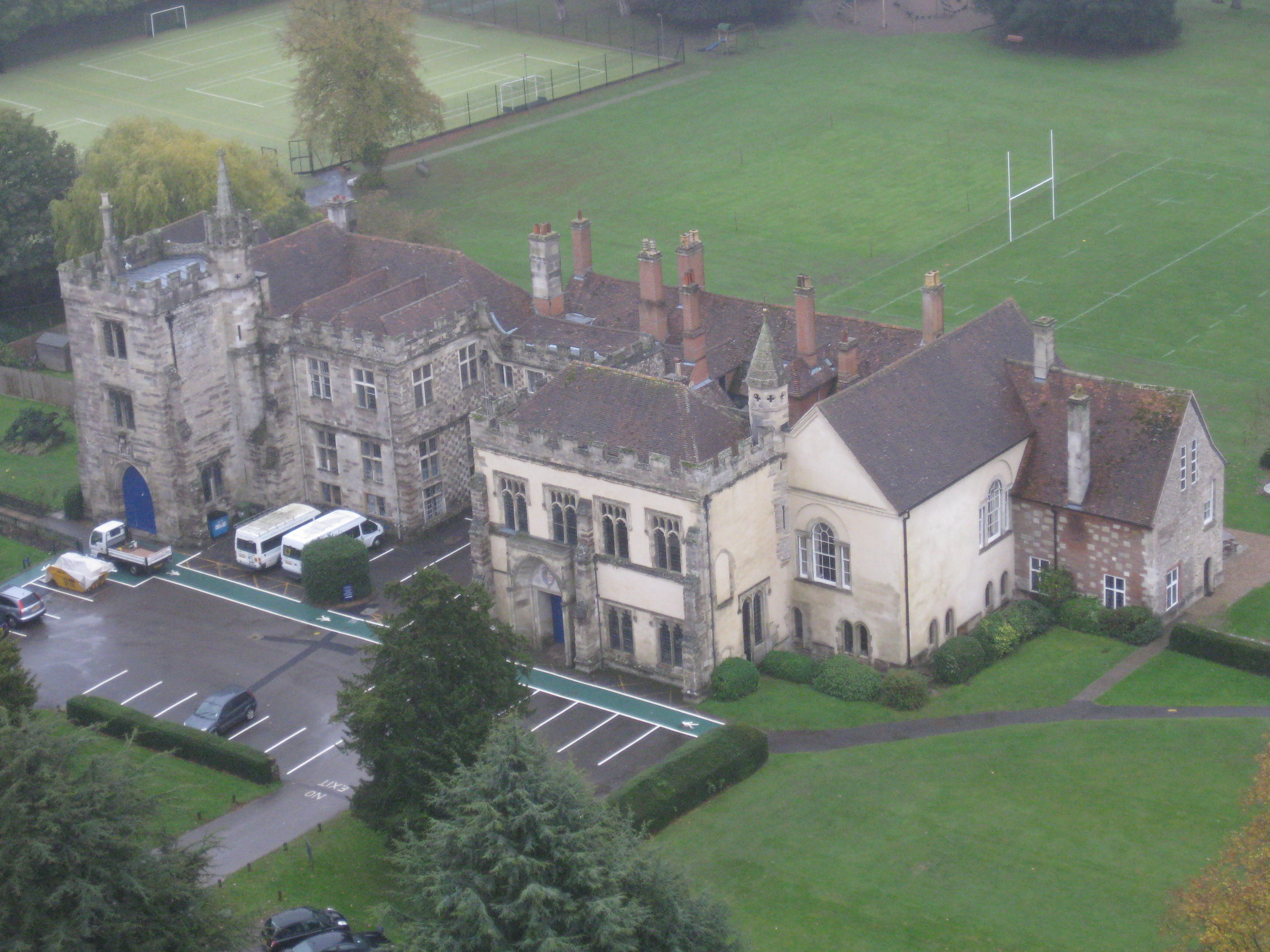
Salisbury Cathedral School, the oldest school in Wiltshire and the 17th oldest in the United Kingdom

== Schools still in operation ==
Rank	School name	Location	Established	Age (years)
1	Salisbury Cathedral School	Salisbury	1091	935
2	Dauntsey's School	West Lavington	1542	484
3	Warminster School	Warminster	1707	319
4	Box Primary School	Box	1708	318
5	Godolphin School	Salisbury	1726	300
6	St Mary's School, Broughton Gifford	Broughton Gifford	1782	244
7	Matravers School	Westbury	1814	212
8	St Edmund's Girls' School	Laverstock	1815	211
9	Lacock Primary School	Lacock	1824	202
10	Preshute Church of England Primary School	Preshute	1833	193
11	Marlborough College	Marlborough	1843	183
12	Pitton Primary School	Pitton	1850	176
13	Neston Primary School	Neston	1861	165
14	St. Joseph's Roman Catholic Primary School	Devizes	1864	162
15	St Mary's School, Calne	Calne	1873	153
16	Chafyn Grove School	Salisbury	1879	147
17	Sandroyd School	Tollard Royal	1888	138
18	Bishop Wordsworth's School	Salisbury	1889	137
19	Stonar School	Atworth	1895	131

== Former schools and colleges ==
Rank	Name	Location	Established	Closed	Age (years)
1	College of the Valley Scholars	Salisbury	1262	1542	279–280
2	Heytesbury Grammar School	Heytesbury	1472	c. 1700	227–228
3	Marlborough Royal Free Grammar School	Marlborough	1550	1975	424–425
4	City Grammar School, Salisbury	Salisbury	1561	1865	303–304
5	Bentley's School, Calne	Calne	1660	1974	313–314
6	Fitzmaurice Grammar School	Bradford-on-Avon	1897	1980	82–83

== See also ==
- List of the oldest schools in the United Kingdom
- List of schools in Wiltshire
