= Lane End =

Lane End is the name of more than one place.

In the United Kingdom:

- Lane End, Bradford
- Lane End, Buckinghamshire
- Lane End, Cumbria
- Lane End, Derbyshire
- Lane End, Devon
- Lane End, Dorset
- Lane End, Kent
- Lane End, Hampshire
- Lane End, Herefordshire
- Lane End, Isle of Wight
- Lane End, Staffordshire, a district of Stoke-on-Trent incorporated with Longton, Staffordshire, in 1865.
- Lane End, Surrey
- Lane End, Wiltshire
