= Claire Sturgess =

English disc jockey (born 1966)

Claire Annette Sturgess (born 15 September 1966) is an English DJ and voiceover artist.

== Early life ==
She was born in Salisbury in Wiltshire, where she grew up. She attended Durrington comprehensive school in Durrington, Wiltshire.

== Career ==
=== BBC Radio 1 ===
She was a presenter on BBC Radio 1 from 1993, after working as a production assistant on the Simon Bates mid-morning show. Firstly, she sat in for Mark Goodier for one week in February 1993 before taking over the Friday Rock Show from Tommy Vance in April that year as well as the 1-4 am overnight slot on Sunday nights/Monday mornings. Following Dave Lee Travis's departure in August 1993, she took over the Saturday mid-morning show, (with Nicky Campbell presenting the show on Sundays). Danny Baker took the show in October 1993.

Her Rock Show moved to Sunday afternoon in October 1993, following the restructuring of the station by new controller Matthew Bannister, but it then moved to Sunday Evening just 7 months later in May 1994. She was added to the presenting roster of BBC television music programme Top of the Pops in September 1994 but presented only two episodes before being replaced by Lisa I'Anson.

Sturgess moved to the weekday overnight slot in 1996 and remained there until leaving Radio 1 in July 1997.

=== XFM ===
She joined London's Xfm when it launched as a full-time station in September 1997 and left in 2007. As well as hosting her own evening show, she filled in for Karl Pilkington on Ricky Gervais and Stephen Merchant's XFM radio show.

=== NME Radio ===
In June 2008, she joined the line-up of the new NME Radio, presenting the breakfast show and her Saturday afternoon show. She is also a continuity announcer for Sky One and Sky Movies.

=== Absolute Radio ===
In 2015 Claire Sturgess joined Absolute Radio, taking the 4-6 pm slots on both Saturdays and Sundays, the latter being a request show. She now presents Fridays 7-10 pm (Absolute '80s Greatest Hits), Saturdays 7-10pm (Classic Rock Party) and Sundays 6pm-8pm (Absolute Radio Request Show). She also presents weekdays 10 am-1 pm on Absolute Classic Rock.

=== Greatest Hits Radio ===
In 2025, she joined Greatest Hits Radio taking over from Kate Thornton on Saturday afternoons.

From September 2026, Claire took over the weekend Breakfast show on Saturday and Sunday mornings from 6 – 9am.

=== Mellow Magic ===
From 2 February 2026, Claire Sturgess is joining Mellow Magic Breakfast 7am to 10am. Taking over from Jen Thomas as she is moving to Magic Musicals & Virgin Radio UK.
