= Charlotte Long =

English actress

The Honourable Charlotte Long
- Born: Charlotte Helen Long; 9 October 1965; Devizes, Wiltshire, England
- Died: 6 October 1984 (aged 18); Oxfordshire, England
- Occupation: Actress
- Years active: 1976–1984

Charlotte Helen Long (9 October 1965 – 6 October 1984) was an English aristocrat and child actress, the youngest daughter of the 4th Viscount Long.

== Biography ==
Born in Devizes, Wiltshire, she grew up at the nearby Long family seat of Steeple Ashton Manor and attended the Stonar School in Atworth. When the manor was sold in late 1976, she moved with her family to the town of Bradford on Avon and was enrolled at Fitzmaurice Grammar School until its closure and merger into St Laurence School in 1980. Long remained at the latter to continue her education, but in 1983 she abandoned her A-level studies and moved to London to pursue her acting career.

She had first appeared on screen in 1976 with an uncredited child role in Alvin Rakoff's Mrs. Amworth, part of the HTV horror anthology Classics Dark and Dangerous which was re-released as a film the following year. Long's talent for mimicry later won her the lead role of Alison Dayne in the 1982 BBC film Schoolgirl Chums and its 1983 sequel St. Ursula's in Danger, adaptations of the Peter Glidewell books directed by Ian Keill. She made several more acting appearances in 1984 including Carine Adler's Touch and Go and Jack Gold's The Chain, but her career culminated with the role of Eloise de Ricordeau in the first series of BBC science fiction drama The Tripods, broadcast that autumn.

Long was due to resume the role for The Tripods' second series the following year, but shortly after completing filming for the first series she died from injuries sustained in a road accident. The resulting inquest heard that her car had broken down on the hard shoulder of the M4 motorway and was hit by a passing lorry, whose driver attributed the accident to sneezing. Her passenger survived with minor injuries.

Her funeral was attended by around three hundred mourners including many of the actors and directors with whom she had worked. For The Tripods' second series she was replaced in the role of Eloise de Ricordeau by Cindy Shelley.

== See also ==
- Juanita Coco, an Australian child singer who was killed in an accident whilst still a teenager
- Jessica Jacobs, an Australian child actress and singer who was killed in an accident whilst still a teenager
