= Matravers =

Matravers may refer to:

== Places ==
- Langton Matravers, village in the Purbeck district of Dorset, England
- Lytchett Matravers, large village in the Purbeck district of Dorset, England
- Worth Matravers, village and civil parish in Dorset, England

== People ==
- Nick Phillips, Baron Phillips of Worth Matravers (born 1938), British judge, the Senior Lord of Appeal in Ordinary
- Murray Matravers, British musician, frontman and founder of the band hard life (originally Easy Life)
- Sarah Matravers (born 1973), English model and actress

== See also ==
- Matravers School
- Baron Maltravers
