= Box Primary School =

Primary school in Box, Wiltshire, England

Box Church of England Primary School
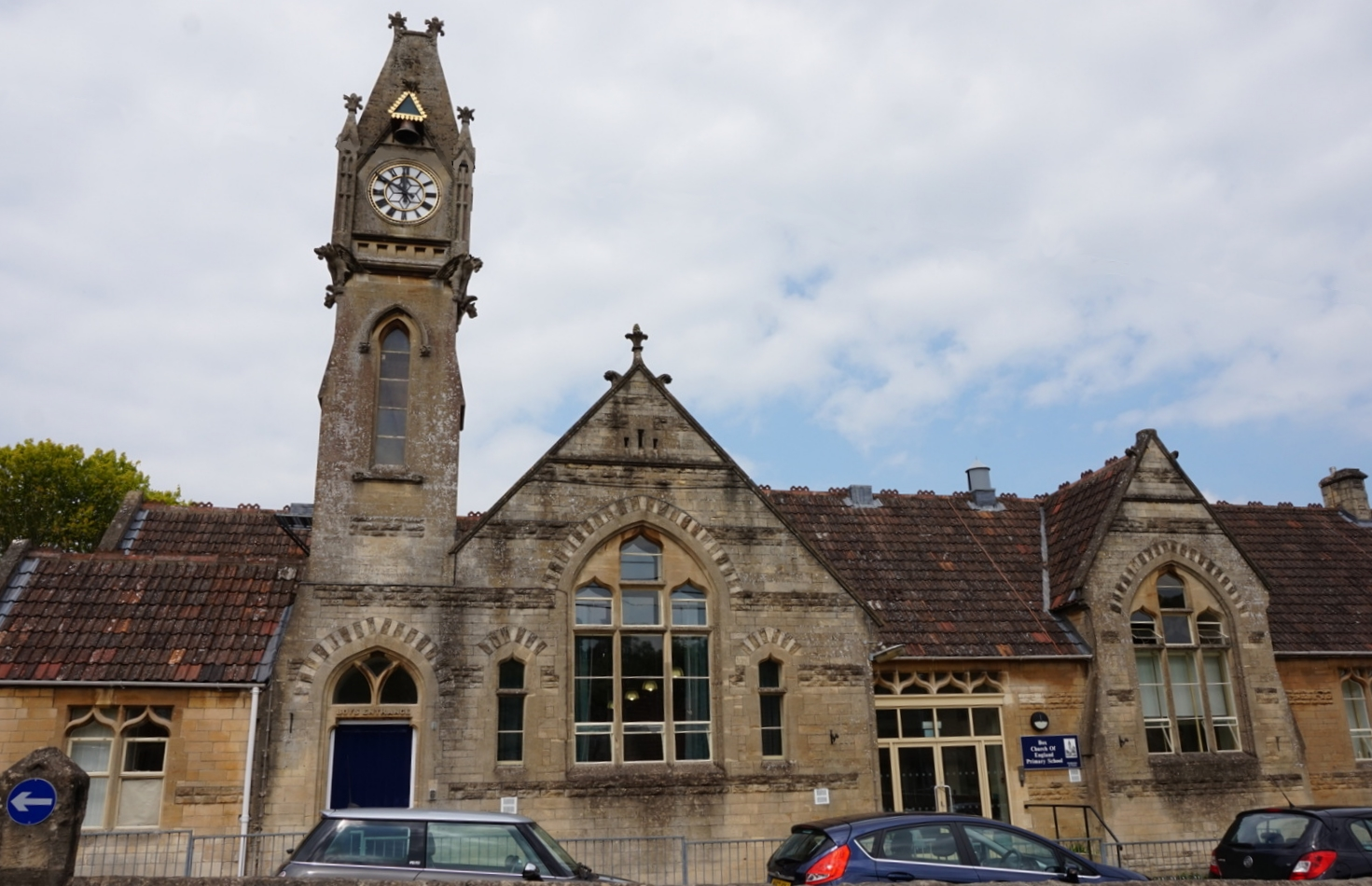

Location
- High Street; Box, Wiltshire, SN13 8NF; England; 51.4159°N 2.2518°W

Information
- Type: Voluntary controlled school
- Motto: Plant, nurture, flourish, serve
- Religious affiliation: Church of England
- Established: 1708; 318 years ago
- Department for Education URN: 126302 Tables
- Ofsted: Reports
- Head teacher: Kelvin Chappell
- Gender: Mixed
- Age: 4 to 11
- Enrolment: 176 (January 2022)
- Website: www.box.wilts.sch.uk

Box Church of England Primary School, commonly known as Box Primary School, is a state-run primary school in Box, Wiltshire, England that is part of the mosaic partnership trust. The current headteacher is Kelvin Chappell.

== History ==
The first school in the village was established in 1708 by the vicar, the Rev. George Millard.

In 1710, Lady Rachel Speke (1657–1711), eldest daughter of Sir William Wyndham, left £100 for the school, and other members of the Speke family also made bequests. The funds were intended for "teaching poor children to read and instructing them in the knowledge and practice of the Christian religion, as professed and taught in the Church of England".

In April 2024, it became part of the Mosaic Partnership Trust.

The school has over 300 years of history and is among the oldest surviving schools in Wiltshire.

== Building ==
The school has occupied its present Grade II listed Victorian building since 1875.

The building was constructed as an elementary church school at a cost of £2,700 and was designed to accommodate 400 pupils. An extension was added in 2005.

== See also ==
- List of oldest schools in Wiltshire
- List of schools in Wiltshire
