= St Helena Secondary College =

School in Eltham North, Victoria, Australia

Location
- Eltham North, Victoria; Australia; 37°41′15″S 145°8′23″E

Information
- Type: Public
- Motto: Dare to be Excellent
- Established: 1984
- Principal: Karen Terry
- Teaching staff: 111
- Grades: 7–12
- Enrollment: 1607
- Colours: Maroon, grey & black
- Website: sthelena.vic.edu.au

St Helena Secondary College is a co-educational state secondary school in Eltham North, Victoria, Australia. The school is situated within the City of Banyule local council area. St Helena Secondary College has an enrolment ceiling (maximum number of students). Due to the demand for places at the school exceeding this ceiling in some years, the school has a geographic zone around it within which students are prioritised for enrolment.

== Structure ==
The school is divided into three separate 'mini schools', each catering for the needs of the students at the different stages of their development. Each mini school also has its own principal. These 'Mini School Principals' work mainly with their own mini school, while also being involved in school-wide positions and tasks. The current principals are: Junior School – Shaun Isbister; Middle School – Vittoria Saliba; Senior School – Simon Braknys. The College Principal is Karen Terry.

== Performance ==
The college was involved in the Rock Eisteddfod annual competition to create dance routines until it ceased in 2012. The first college drama production, "I'm on TV" was staged in 2004. A musical production is held each year, and the Juanita Coco Award is awarded each year, named for former student Juanita Coco who died in a car accident in 1993. All of St Helena's students are encouraged to learn a musical instrument; there are currently four concert bands, with brass, woodwind and percussion instruments, four jazz bands, as well as many smaller ensembles. Each year, the Senior Concert Band and the Senior Jazz Band travel interstate to compete in band competitions.

== Notable past students ==
- Alicia Banit – Actress
- Alyssa Bannan – AFLW
- Christie Whelan Browne – actress
- Jaryd Clifford – Paralympic athlete
- Juanita Coco – Young Talent Time star
- Dayyan Eng – Film director
- Brayden Fiorini – AFL footballer
- Luke Godden – AFL Footballer
- Chris Kamolins – AFL Umpire
- Lachlan Jones – Paralympian
- Darcy Macpherson – AFL footballer
- Alex Patterson – Matador
- Simon Prestigiacomo – AFL Footballer
- Adam Simpson – AFL footballer
- Nick Vlastuin – AFL footballer
- Naim Kurt – Politician
- Luke Kidgell - Comedian
