= Juanita Coco =

Australian singer and actress (1975–1993)

- Born: Juanita Suzanne Coco; 10 December 1975
- Origin: Melbourne, Victoria, Australia
- Died: 2 May 1993 (aged 17) East Malvern, Victoria, Australia
- Genres: Pop
- Occupations: Singer, variety show performer
- Instrument: Vocals
- Years active: 1987–1993

Juanita Suzanne Coco (10 December 1975 – 2 May 1993) was an Australian child singer and variety performer who was a regular on the talent and variety television show, Young Talent Time. Coco appeared on the show from 1987 to 1988, from the age of 11 to 13. Coco was often paired with Joey Dee for duets. She had replaced Vanessa Windsor on the show and was the 35th member to join. After the show's demise, Coco worked with a professional cover band on a regular basis until her final year of high school (Year 12). She then formed a young band, Milk, who were working on original songs and about to start performing at the time of her death in 1993.

== Death ==
On 2 May 1993, Juanita Coco attended her boyfriend, Scott Tiedgen's, 20th birthday party in North Melbourne. At the end of the evening, she got into a Subaru wagon driven by a female friend of another guest, accompanied by Tiedgen, and his friend, Brad Lacey, 21 years old, and two other friends.

As the vehicle travelled through Malvern, it ran a red traffic light and was broadsided by another vehicle. Sitting in the back seat, Coco and Lacey were killed instantly due to the force of the impact. The driver survived with no injuries and Tiedgen survived with serious injuries. Coco was 17 when she died. A subsequent investigation found that the driver of the Subaru was under the influence of alcohol at the time of the accident; manslaughter charges were later dropped in court.

== Legacy ==
Juanita Coco's mother Jenny Coco and her husband Patrick formed The Friends of the Donor Tissue Bank of Victoria, following their daughter's donation of heart valve and corneas. Jenny, accompanied by a scientist from the Tissue Bank, gave talks to groups about the personal side of tissue donation and the importance of discussing it with family. Since her death, her former high school, St Helena Secondary College, has presented The Juanita Coco Inspiration Award, to the person(s) who avidly carry on the spirit of Coco in their annual musical production. It is "voted on by the cast and crew" and the criteria include leadership, ability and compassion.

== See also ==
- Jessica Jacobs, an Australian child actor and singer who was killed in an accident as a teenager
- Charlotte Long, an English child actor killed in an accident as a teenager
- Jaclyn Linetsky, a Canadian child actor killed in an accident as a teenager
- Rob Knox, an English child actor murdered as a teenager
