= Geoffrey Copland =

Geoffrey Copland CBE CPhys FInstP FRSA
- Born: Geoffrey Malcolm Copland; 28 June 1942 (age 84)
- Education: Fitzmaurice Grammar School; University of Oxford (MA, DPhil)
- Scientific career
- Fields: Physics
- Workplaces: Yale University; Queen Mary College; Queen Elizabeth College; Goldsmiths College; Polytechnic of Central London; University of Westminster; Trinity Laban Conservatoire of Music and Dance
- Thesis: Some hyperfine interactions in solids (1967)
- Doctoral advisor: Brebis Bleaney
- Website: www.trinitylaban.ac.uk/about-us/governance/governors/dr-geoffrey-copland-cbe/

Geoffrey Malcolm Copland CBE CPhys FInstP FRSA (born 28 June 1942) is a British physicist and former vice-chancellor of the University of Westminster.

== Education ==
Copland was educated at Fitzmaurice Grammar School in Bradford-on-Avon. He was an undergraduate student at Merton College, Oxford where he read Physics from 1960. After being awarded a first class undergraduate degree in 1963, he remained in Oxford for his DPhil, which was awarded in 1967 for research on hyperfine structure supervised by Brebis Bleaney.

== Career and research ==
Following his doctorate, Copland spent two years at Yale University, before returning to the UK in 1969 as a lecturer in physics at Queen Mary College. In 1971 he joined Queen Elizabeth College as a lecturer in physics, a post he held until 1980. In 1981 he was made dean of studies at Goldsmiths College, then in 1987 he moved to become deputy rector at the Polytechnic of Central London (which later became the University of Westminster), becoming its rector and vice-chancellor in 1996. Since 2007 he has been a consultant on higher education, and has held a range of academic and industry positions, including serving as chair and vice chair of Trinity Laban Conservatoire of Music and Dance.

=== Awards and honours ===
He was awarded a Fellowship of the Royal Society of Arts (FRSA) in 1991, and appointed a Commander of the Order of the British Empire (CBE) in the 2007 Birthday Honours for services to higher education. The main-belt asteroid 9193 Geoffreycopland, discovered on 10 March 1992 by Duncan Steel at Siding Spring Observatory is named after him.

== Personal life ==
Copland has been twice married, firstly in 1967 to Janet Mary Todd, with whom he had a son and a daughter; their marriage was dissolved in 1985, and that year Copland remarried, to Dorothy Joy Harrison.
