= Clara Grant =

English educational pioneer and social reformer

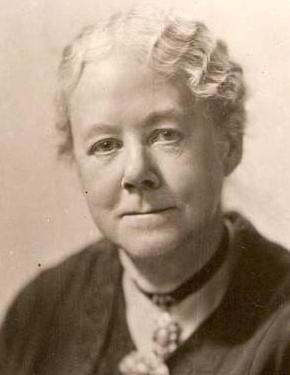
Clara Ellen Grant

Clara Ellen Grant OBE (21 June 1867 – 10 October 1949), known as 'The Farthing Bundle Woman of Bow', was an educator, a pioneer in London of infant children's education, and a social reformer. She founded in 1907 the Fern Street Settlement, set up to feed and clothe poor and hungry children in the East End of London.

== Early life ==
Clara Grant was born in the village of Chapmanslade in Wiltshire in 1867, one of nine children born to Maria and Thomas Grant, a painter and glazier. Her home was one of books as both her parents were well-read, while her father was a self-taught musician and the organist at the local church. Grant described herself as 'the only plain one of a family of good-looking sisters' However, she developed other skills including intelligence, independence, diplomacy and a strong social conscience. Aged 5, she was one of the first pupils of Chapmanslade's new national school, where she proved to be a headstrong and difficult student. In 1875, she and her family moved to Frome where for a brief period she attended a national school followed by a seminary for young ladies in Fromefield. By the age of 13, she was a pupil teacher at Christ Church infants' school and by the age of 14, she was senior pupil teacher. Hers was a Christian upbringing and as a young woman, Grant had an independent streak, deciding to further her own education in order to become a teacher in London, to which aim in 1886 she undertook training at Salisbury Diocesan Training College.

== Career ==
Her first teaching job was as headmistress in a church school in her home village in 1888. From late 1890 to 1893 Grant achieved her ambition of teaching in London when she was the head of a small school in Hoxton, then a deprived area. During this period she advanced her own education through a series of university extension courses and lectures at Gresham College. Apart from a brief and unfulfilling period teaching at a boarding school in 1893, from 1894 to 1900 Grant dedicated her life to working with the poorest children in Wapping, then one of the most deprived areas of London. In 1896, Grant added to her Christmas card a short 'wants list' through which she hoped for the donation of old clothes and unwanted household goods for her pupils' families. From this list, she little realised she would develop her life's work. It had been her intention to join the universities' mission to central Africa, but instead she was to devote her life to the children of the East End of London.

In 1900, she was appointed headmistress of All Hallows School in Bow, one of five small schools in the area, all of which were made of tin. In 1905, Devons Road Infants' School in Bromley-by-Bow, a new purpose-built school opened to accommodate all the children from the tin schools, with Grant again as headmistress.

== Charitable work ==
A disciple of the German educator Friedrich Fröbel who originated the kindergarten, Grant came to believe that children could not be taught effectively if they were cold, hungry and unhappy. In 1907 she set up the Fern Street Settlement, initially in her own home but from 1911 in a series of converted terraced cottages to feed and clothe the children of the poor of the East End of London. The Settlement fostered links to the Voluntary Health Visiting Association, which sent a staff member and a nurse once a month for one year to visit each baby born to a family with a child at Devons Road Infants School.

Inspired by the work of the Anglican priest and social reformer Samuel Barnett of Toynbee Hall among the poor of Whitechapel and Spitalfields, Grant organised hot breakfasts for her young pupils, buying porridge, milk, bread and butter from her own pocket. In addition, she supplied her pupils with clothing and boots. Realising that children needed to be able to play in 1913 she conceived the idea of the 'Farthing Bundle' of toys costing a farthing, a scheme that was to last for more than fifty years. The toys in each bundle were made from recycled materials and were distributed to poor children. In this way, a piece of firewood could be fashioned into a simple doll by wrapping it in newspaper; while a pair of worn stockings stuffed and tied with string could be used as cricket balls. Other gifts might include whistles, shells, beads, reels, marbles, fancy boxes, decorated pill boxes, ballroom pencils, scraps of patchwork, odds and ends of silk or wool, coloured paper for dressing up, cigarette cards and scraps. Queen Mary visited the Settlement after which she often sent Grant greetings cards to be reused in the 'bundles'.

Demand for the 'farthing bundles' became so great that Grant decided she could only assist her smaller charges, and as she did not have time to inquire of their age or anything about them she devised a wooden arch 4 feet 4½ inches high on which was engraved the phrase "Enter Now Ye Children Small; None Can Come Who Are Too Tall". The children had to pass through this arch without stooping before they could receive a bundle. On average 500 children would begin queuing at 6 am to walk through the arch. The children paid a farthing per bundle which Grant intended to give the children the dignity of feeling that they were not receiving charity but had actually paid for their gift. It also gave them the right to complain if they felt their bundle was inadequate. So that taller children would not be left out, Grant later set up a 'penny shop'.

The 'farthing bundles' operated throughout World War I, the Depression of the 1930s, World War II and into the 1960s, some years after Grant's death. In 1964 a boy might have found in his bundle a comic, a cardboard aeroplane, a pencil and notebook, chalks, marbles in a matchbox, a ball and a toy car – all for ½d (half an old penny), farthings having been out of circulation since 1961. During WWI, Grant helped with organising the local air raid shelter and comforted those who had lost loved ones during the conflict. Grant retired from teaching in 1927 but was never able to bring herself to retire from the Settlement.

Grant published a series of nine manuals for infant school teachers to promote her views on the importance of play and recreation for children. To that aim she advocated for parks and organized sports for children and outings for their mothers. Her The Teacher's Book of Toy Making was published in 1917, while her book The Teacher's Book of Drawing Chats: A Series of Chats for Babies Accompanied by Drawings was published by Evans Brothers of London shortly after. She later wrote two autobiographical and self-published works to raise money for her educational and philanthropic work: From 'Me' to 'We': Forty Years on Bow Common (1930) and Farthing Bundles (1930).

== Honours ==
In 1949, aged 81, Grant was awarded an OBE for her services to education. She later wrote, "To me has fallen the happy task of sharing gifts among our people. There is nothing so embarrassing as wearing as an ill-fitting halo – but a life one would not change for any other."

== Death ==
Clara Grant died in 1949 aged 82 at her home at 38 Fern Street and was buried in Tower Hamlets Cemetery, near to her Fern Street Settlement. She never married.

== Legacy ==
She is commemorated by the Clara Grant Primary School – renamed from the Devons School in 1993 – and Clara Grant House in Mellish Street on the Isle of Dogs. In 2014 Grant was recognised by the London Borough of Tower Hamlets with a purple People's Plaque on the wall outside the Settlement in Fern Street, the work of which continues to this day. In 2015 a blue plaque was unveiled on her former home in Frome in recognition of her lifetime's work in education.

In recent years Grant has been criticised for failing to advocate birth control as a means of alleviating poverty and for failing to recognise the social causes of poverty. Her claim that she did not want to get involved in the contraception issue gives more the impression of a Victorian spinster's reluctance to discuss such matters than a failure to understand the problem. Certainly, she clearly understood the connection between poverty and its social causes as much of her writing comments on society's responsibility towards its poorer members in the matters of health, housing and recreation.
