= The Music Machine (radio station) =

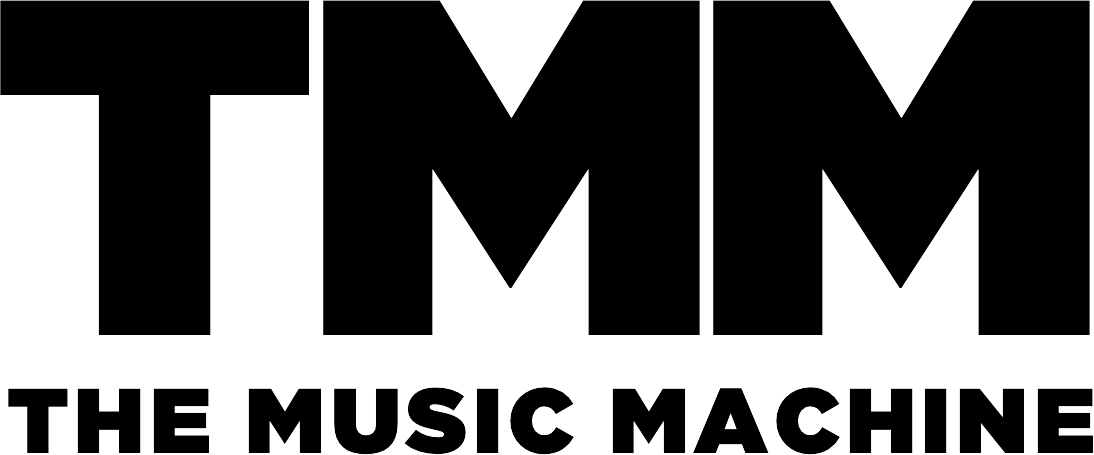
- England
- Frequencies: TMM 1: DAB+: 9A (London), 9C (Norwich); TMM 2: DAB+: 9C (Norwich)

Programming
- Format: Alternative/indie music
- Affiliations: NME magazine (formerly)

Ownership
- Owner: The Music Machine Ltd. (Sammy Jacob)
- Sister stations: CDNX

History
- First air date: 24 June 2008 (first iteration); 13 June 2018 (second iteration)
- Former names: NME Radio

Links
- Website: themusicmachine.co.uk

The Music Machine (TMM) is a pair of British radio stations that broadcast an alternative music format. It is owned and operated by Sammy Jacob, founder of the original XFM. The station dates back to NME Radio which broadcast from 2008 to 2013 under branding of the popular music publication NME. It relaunched in 2018 under NME branding before renaming to TMM in 2023.

The two channels, TMM 1 and TMM 2, are broadcast 24/7 and can be received online via TuneIn or through the TMM website, and on DAB locally in Norwich and in parts of London.

== History ==
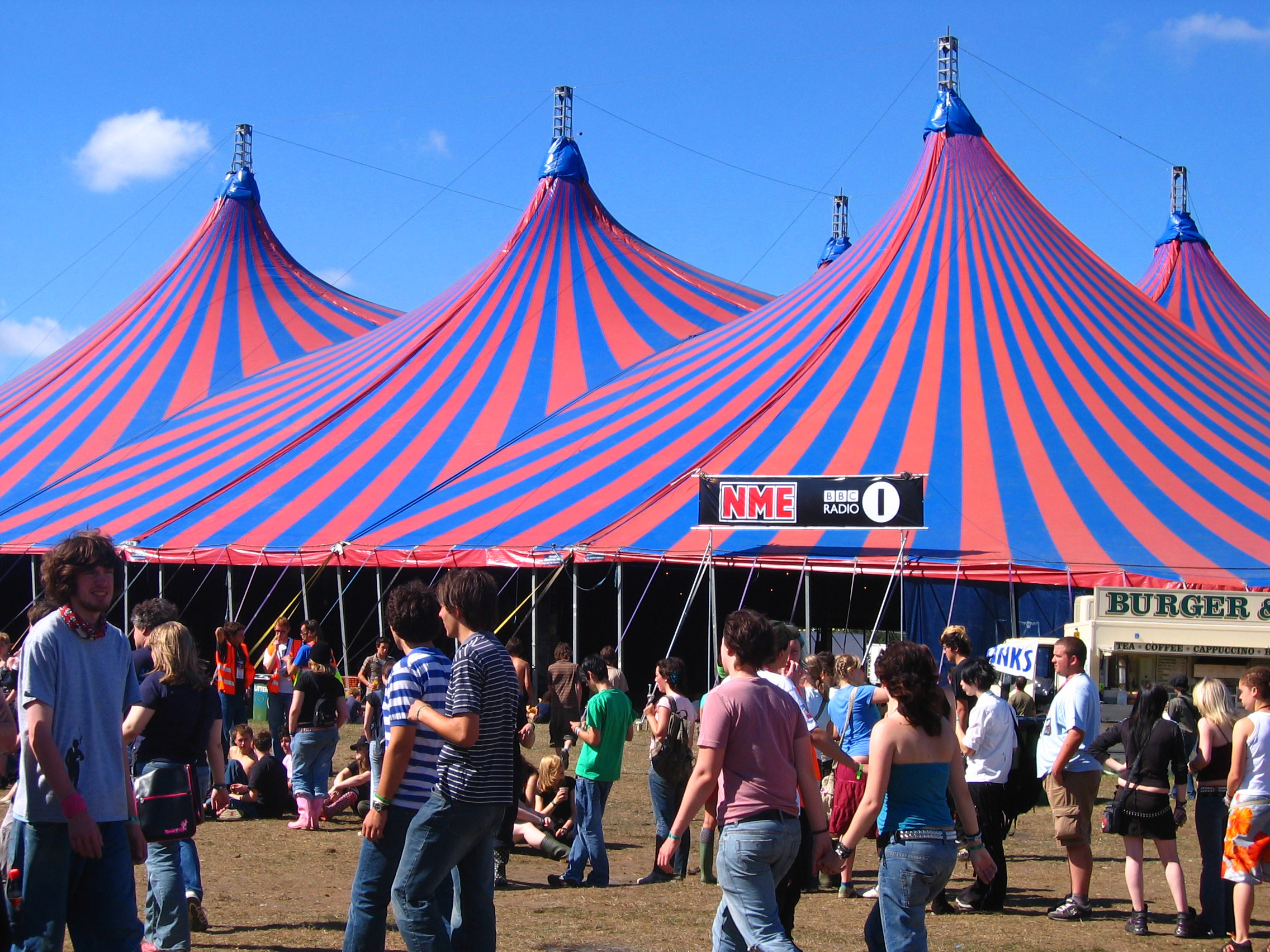
Radio 1/NME tent at the 2005 Reading Festival

Initial plans for an NME-branded radio station were revealed to the media in late 2007 by Sammy Jacob, creator of XFM, who left the station following its purchase by Global Radio. The station began operating under licence soon after by DX Media, a company operated by Jacob, launching on 24 June 2008 with its first track being "Knights of Cydonia" by British rock band Muse. The presenting line-up at launch included Neil Cole and Claire Sturgess. It was broadcast from studios in the Blue Fin Building in the South Bank of London, also home to IPC Media.

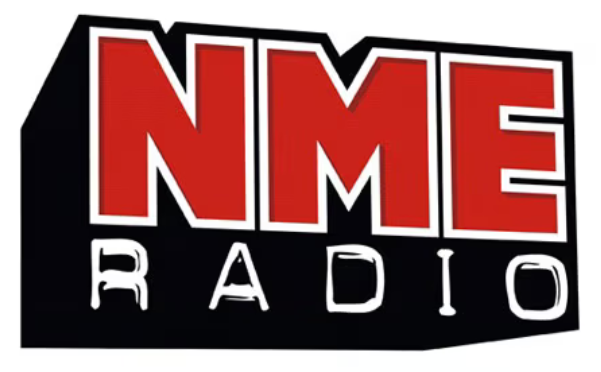
NME Radio

The station was initially only on Sky, Virgin Media and Freesat. NME Radio then launched on 87.7 FM in Manchester temporarily in November and December 2008. It broadcast temporarily here again in May 2009. At the same time it launched on DAB digital radio in the London region. On 22 December 2009, the station launched nationally on DAB joining the Digital One platform for an eight-month trial. Alex Zane, formerly of XFM, joined NME Radio on 30 April 2010 hosting a new Friday night show.

On Friday 11 June 2010, almost two years after its launch, The Guardian reported that DX Media had decided to end the agreement with IPC Media (owner of NME) to operate the service. As a consequence, NME Radio turned into an online only automated "jukebox" format and ceased broadcasting on DAB digital radio, Sky, Virgin Media and Freesat platforms. Then on 21 July 2010, IPC Media signed a new licence agreement with local radio group Town and Country Broadcasting. This led to the relaunch of NME Radio in September 2010 and it returned to some regional digital audio broadcasting (DAB) multiplexes in South Wales and also to Freesat and Sky, where it was available until 5 December 2011. Operation sites were split between IPC Media's London HQ and Town and Country Broadcasting's station in south Wales, Nation Radio.

NME Radio, under Town and Country Broadcasting, unexpectedly ceased broadcasting on 25 March 2013 at midday. There was no official announcement and it took presenter Michelle Owen to break the news in a Twitter post that afternoon.

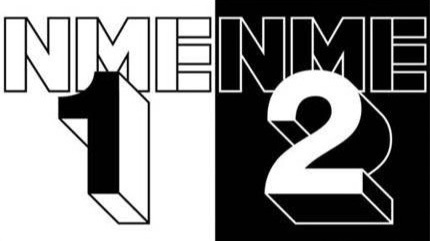
NME 1 and 2

NME Radio relaunched on 13 June 2018 with two stations, NME 1 and NME 2, with Sammy Jacob returning to be the station manager. The new NME stations took over online from Jacob's Camden Xperience Radio channels (CDNX), which were operated on a trial basis. NME 1 played "classics" while NME 2 played tracks of "the past decade".

Initially, the new NME radio stations were available on DAB in Norwich and Brighton (NME 1 only). NME 1 launched on DAB in London in September 2018. Meanwhile, CDNX returned to DAB in London on the same multiplex in January 2020.

In 2023, the contract with NME magazine was terminated and as a result, NME 1 and NME 2 were renamed TMM 1 and TMM 2, under Jacob's own The Music Machine branding. The change took effect on DAB in London on 10 December 2023.

Since at least 19 September 2026, there has been an announcement on the website stating that the service will be discontinued on 30 September: "After 15 years, and due to limited available time, TMM will be ending on 30 September 2026."

== Programming and music styles ==
The first iteration of NME Radio when under the control of DX Media, the station featured a variety of presenters (many formerly of XFM), including Claire Sturgess, Iain Baker, Neil Cole, Chris Martin and Ricky Gervais. Its music was focused on modern indie alternative rock. Following the takeover of operations by Town and Country Broadcasting, some daytime programmes were initially introduced. Presenters included Chris Blumer and Ben Evans.

The second iteration of NME Radio, now The Music Machine, is mainly a jukebox. According to the station, TMM 1 plays "classics from 60’s Garage and 90’s Grunge to 70’s Punk and 80’s New Wave" along with a selection of new music. TMM 2 on the other hand is described as playing new music covering "Indie to Electronic and Urban to Dance".
