= All Saints' Church, Westbury =

Coordinates: 51.2619°N 2.1823°W

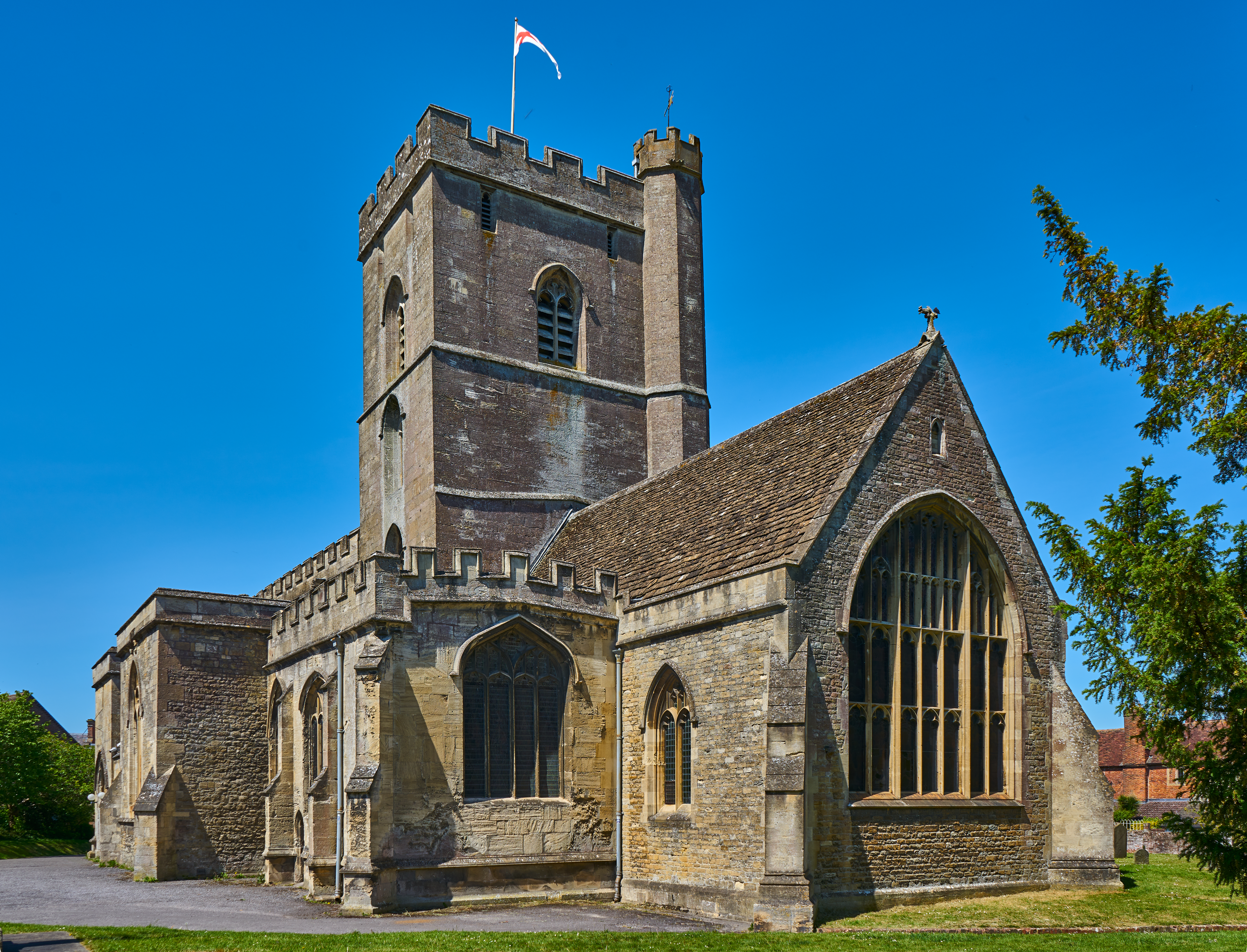
- All Saints' from the south-east in May 2020

- Location in Wiltshire
- OS grid reference: ST 87375 51430
- Location: Westbury, Wiltshire
- Country: England
- Denomination: Anglican
- Website: whtministry.org.uk

Architecture
- Functional status: Parish church
- Style: Decorated Gothic, Perpendicular Gothic
- Years built: 1340–c.1550

Administration
- Province: Canterbury
- Diocese: Salisbury
- Archdeaconry: Sarum
- Deanery: Heytesbury
- Parish: Westbury

Listed Building – Grade I
- Reference no.: 1180510

The Church of All Saints is the main Church of England parish church in Westbury, Wiltshire, England. There has been a church on the site since Saxon times, and the current church, largely rebuilt around 1437, is a Grade I listed building.

== History and architecture ==
A church on this site has existed since at least 1086 and was recorded in the Domesday Book. It is most likely to have been a Saxon wooden church on the same site as the present church. The first stone church on the site was built circa 1220 by the Normans, and this was replaced by a 14th-century Gothic church using the same plan as the Norman church.

This Gothic church was built between approximately 1340 and 1380 in the transitional style between the Decorated and Perpendicular Gothic styles. Parts of this building can be seen in the present church, notably in the lower parts of the transepts and nave and the lower portion of the tower. This building was extensively rebuilt and extended from circa 1437, which included adding a clerestory to the nave, adding three chapels and raising the central tower to its present height of 84 feet (26 metres). The north chapel was built and endowed by William de Westbury (d. 1448/49; a judge of the King's Bench) and his father.

In the middle of the 16th century, the south porch was built with a small room above it and the chancel was extended eastwards to its present length. By 1847, major restoration was required and was led by the Rev. Stafford Brown. Architect T. H. Wyatt was engaged, the nave roof was renewed, a new large west window and a small vestry created, the east wall of the chancel buttressed and the gallery removed.

In 1968, it was found the stability of the entire building was at risk because an old culvert had broken, and water had saturated the clay into which the foundations of the church were built. Cracks in the stonework were appearing and the tower was leaning. 150 concrete piles were driven into the ground to a depth of up to 40 feet, and connected with new cross beams to stabilise the building.

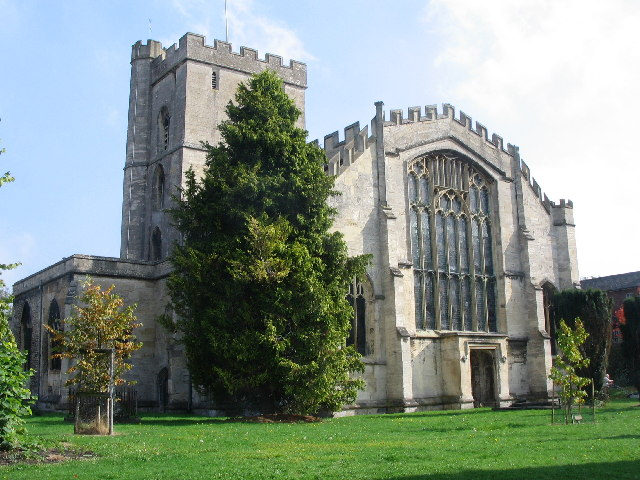
West end of the church

Pevsner likened the architectural style to nearby Edington Priory, although "much renewed". He described the west front as "remarkable, with battlements rising up the steep lean-to roofs of the aisles and the less steep nave roof".

== Bells ==
The central tower, with its unusual rectangular shape, contains the third heaviest peal of eight bells hung for change ringing in the world, after Sherborne Abbey, Dorset and St Peter's Cathedral, Adelaide, Australia. They are popular with visiting bell-ringers.

Prior to 1921, the tower contained a ring of six bells cast by six different founders between 1671 and 1738. John Taylor & Co of Loughborough, Leicestershire, were chosen to overhaul the bells in 1921 and it was proposed to augment them to eight by casting two new trebles, recasting two of the original six and retuning the other four. It was found when they had been removed to the foundry that none of the original bells could be satisfactorily retuned, so the foundry, with permission from the church authorities, recast all six bells and made two more, producing the octave the tower contains today. The tenor weighs 35 long hundredweight and strikes the note C#. There are also a sanctus bell of c.1299, and an unused bell from around 1600 that hangs in an old wooden frame above the peal of eight.

== Monuments ==
Inside the church is a bust by Sir Robert Taylor of William Phipps (c.1681–1748; born at Heywood, became Governor of Bombay).

The churchyard has several table tombs from the 18th century and the first half of the 19th. South-east of the chancel stands the parish war memorial of 1919 or 1920, a tall stone cross on a three-stage carved base and a plain plinth.

== Parish ==
The ancient parish of Westbury extended east to Bratton and west to Dilton, and both areas had churches that were dependent on Westbury. A separate district was assigned to St James' church at Bratton in 1845.

Numbers attending the 14th-century St Mary's church at Dilton (now called Old Dilton) dwindled in the 18th century, and more so after Holy Trinity church was built at Dilton Marsh in 1844, also gaining its own district in 1845. St Mary's went out of regular use in 1900 and was vested in the Churches Conservation Trust in 1974, although it remains consecrated.

In the north, after Holy Trinity at Heywood was built in 1849 a district was assigned to it, further reducing the area of Westbury parish. To the south-west at Westbury Leigh, the Church of the Holy Saviour was built as a chapel of ease in 1877, then enlarged in 1889–90.

Today, All Saints' is at the centre of the White Horse benefice which covers the old and new Dilton churches, Holy Saviour, and the small 1905 church at Brokerswood.

== Vicars ==
- 1603–1623: William Thompson (died 1623)
- 1845–1847: Stafford Brown (died 1847)
- 1847–1850: James Meyrick (died 1854)
- 1850–1881: Henry Hinxman Duke
- 1890–1898: Patrick Murray Smythe
- 1898–1904: Sydney Dugdale
- 1904–1912: William Thomas Baring Hayter
