= St Mary's Church, Old Dilton =

St Mary's Church
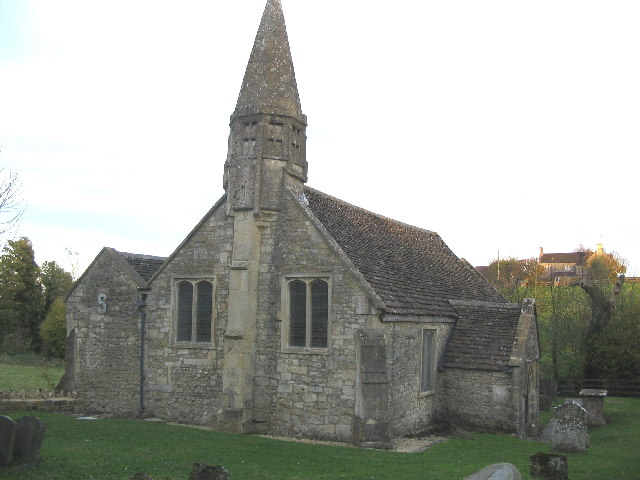

- Location within Wiltshire
- 51°14′25″N 2°12′14″W
- Location: Old Dilton, Wiltshire, England

Listed Building – Grade I
- Designated: 11 September 1968
- Reference no.: 1021476

St Mary's Church in Old Dilton, Wiltshire, England was built in the 14th century. It is recorded in the National Heritage List for England as a Grade I listed building, and is now a redundant church in the care of the Churches Conservation Trust. It was declared redundant on 26 April 1973, and was vested in the Trust on 6 September 1974.

The church stands close to the Biss Brook in Old Dilton hamlet, about 1 1/2 miles (2.4 km) south-west of the town of Westbury. It was a chapelry of Westbury parish church, as the settlement lay within the ancient parish of Westbury. In the early 19th century, one of the curates assisting the vicar of Westbury was assigned to Old Dilton. When Dilton Marsh civil parish was created in 1894 the boundary followed the Biss, placing the church just within the new parish.

The building consists of a nave, chancel, north chapel north aisle and vestry. The gabled south porch is believed to survive from an earlier 14th century building, but the rest of the fabric is 15th century. It has small stone spire at the western end.

The interior of the church was renovated in the 18th century and includes box pews, a three-decker pulpit, and two small galleries. The gallery over the north side of the chancel was used as a schoolroom and has a fireplace. The octagonal stone font is from the 15th century and the Royal Arms of George III can be seen in the chancel.

The church has no electricity supply.

By the beginning of the 19th century, Dilton had dwindled to a hamlet as the population of Dilton Marsh increased. A church was completed at Dilton Marsh in 1844 and the old church closed in 1900, although it was still used for harvest festivals.

Conservation work took place in the 1930s and 1950s, funded by the Society for the Protection of Ancient Buildings. The church remains consecrated and the fabric is maintained by the Churches Conservation Trust. Since 2000, further restoration work has sought to resolve issues caused by damp, brown rot, cellar rot and weevils, including the installation of new drains and gutters (for the first time in the church's history). Two services are held at the church each year.

== See also ==
- List of churches preserved by the Churches Conservation Trust in Southwest England
