= Matravers School =

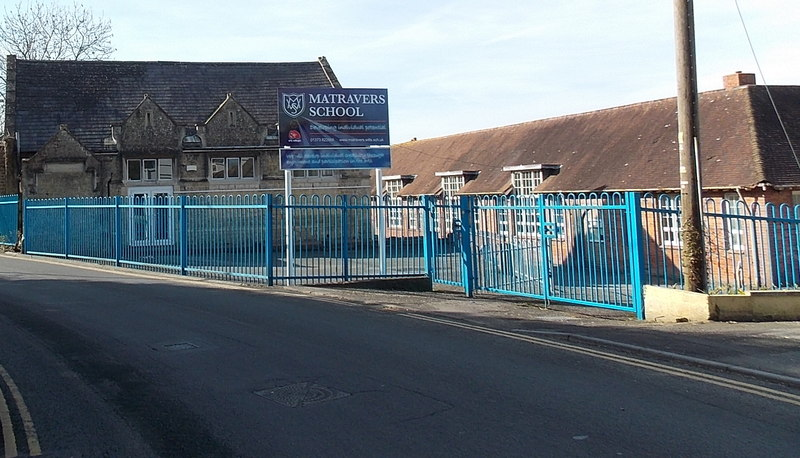
- Buildings of 1844 and 1925, seen from Leigh Road

Location
- Springfield Road; Westbury, Wiltshire, BA13 3QH; England; 51.2571°N 2.189°W

Information
- Type: Foundation school
- Established: 1814
- Founder: John Matravers
- Local authority: Wiltshire Council
- Department for Education URN: 126510 Tables
- Ofsted: Reports
- Headteacher: Simon Riding
- Gender: Mixed
- Age: 11 to 18
- Enrolment: 926 (September 2025)
- Website: www.matravers.wilts.sch.uk

Matravers School is a mixed foundation secondary school with a sixth form, in Westbury in the English county of Wiltshire. As a foundation school, Matravers is administered by Wiltshire Council. Pupils are admitted mainly from Bitham Brook Primary School, Bratton Primary School, Chapmanslade CE Primary School, Dilton Marsh CE Junior School, North Bradley CE Primary School, Westbury CE Junior School and Westbury Leigh CE Primary School.

Founded in 1814 as Matravers's School, about 1844 the school was split into the Westbury British Boys' School and Westbury British Girls' School, on different sites. In 1925, they were merged in Leigh Road as the Westbury Senior Council School. In 1945, this became the Westbury County Secondary Modern School (shortened as Westbury Modern School). The present name was adopted about 1974 with the arrival in Wiltshire of comprehensive education.

== History ==
In his will of 1814, John Matravers left £1,000 (equivalent to £68,851 in 2025) for education, of which £500 was to found a charity school for boys and girls living in the town of Westbury to be taught according to Joseph Lancaster's plan. By 1833, the school was teaching English, arithmetic, geography, and geometry to about two hundred children, for each of whom a charge of a penny a week was made. The annual expenditure was about £100, and income from endowments was £47.17s, with the balance being made up by voluntary contributions. At that time, "Matravers's School" was one of the largest and most advanced in Wiltshire for the children of working people. The school's first home was in Bratton Road, in a building later called the Old Athenaeum.

In 1844 a single schoolroom was built in Lower Road (now Leigh Road) for teaching girls separately, and by 1859 the new school there had about seventy girls. The boys continued in the original school, and both were affiliated with the British and Foreign School Society, being thus called "British Schools". In 1874 the Westbury British Boys' School moved into a room in the new Laverton Institute, and in 1907 its management was transferred to Wiltshire County Council and it became known as the Westbury Laverton Institute School. In 1925 the boys' school was closed, and the girls' school in Lower Road was expanded by two new classrooms to take both girls and boys on the same site, taking the new name of Westbury Senior Council School. In 1929, a loan of £4,600 was needed for an enlargement of the school, providing accommodation for another 160 children, and by 1930 it was taking in children aged over eleven from Heywood, Chapmanslade, Corsley, Dilton Marsh, Bratton, Edington, and Erlestoke.

In 1934, an Old Pupils Association was set up, and this was still going strong in 1955.

In 1945, following the Education Act 1944, the name became the Westbury County Secondary Modern School, sometimes shortened to Westbury Modern School, or W. M. S.

In November 1953, Wiltshire County Council agreed to buy land next to the school for a school farm, so that rural studies could be added to the curriculum. In December 1954, an agricultural science master was appointed. By 1957, the school had a herd of goats.

By 1959, the school had a Travel Club, and in the Easter vacation of that year the headmaster, Mr Watkins, and three other teachers took 23 children on a two-week holiday to Austria. In June 1962, 18 girls and 15 boys set off on a school trip to Bruges.

New buildings for the school in Springfield Road, reported to have cost £130,000 (equivalent to £2,426,383 in 2025) and including a new Assembly Hall, were dedicated at a service in December 1962, with the Latin motto "Fortuna favet fortibus" (Fortune favours the brave) picked out in gold leaf. There were then 450 children in the school.

In 1963, a local boxing club had its training nights in the school's gymn on Mondays and Thursdays and advertised "all lads welcome".

In September 1970, the Bournemouth Sinfonietta presented a concert at the school, conducted by its founder George Hurst.

After it became a comprehensive in September 1974, the school's name was changed to Matravers School. In May 1976, an extension costing £297,000 (equivalent to £2,001,322 in 2025) was under construction at the school, to provide five new science laboratories, a lecture room, four new classrooms, and a room for remedial work, making it possible for the number of children in the school to go up by 200. It was reported in 1977 that the school had doubled in size to 840 pupils since the arrival of the then headmaster Kenneth Evans eleven years before.

From 1945, Westbury children who had passed the eleven-plus exam travelled to the Trowbridge High Schools, and for many years the local provision for sixth formers continued to be in Trowbridge. A sixth form was established at the school in 2003, and in 2012 a purpose-built sixth form centre was opened.

In February 2015 it was reported that the school had told the parents of special needs pupils to keep them at home during an Ofsted standards inspection; the school admitted this and commented that it was common practice to change timetables when school inspectors visited. At this point, there were 1,000 children in the school.

== Present day ==
Matravers School offers GCSEs and BTECs as programmes of study for pupils, while students in the sixth form have the option to study from a range of A-levels and further BTECs.

The school's site has expanded since 1925. In 1963, its address was still given as Leigh Road, but it now has its main access and offices in Springfield Road.
