= St Margaret's, Corsley =

Church in Corsley, Wiltshire, England

Coordinates: 51.2196°N 2.2466°W

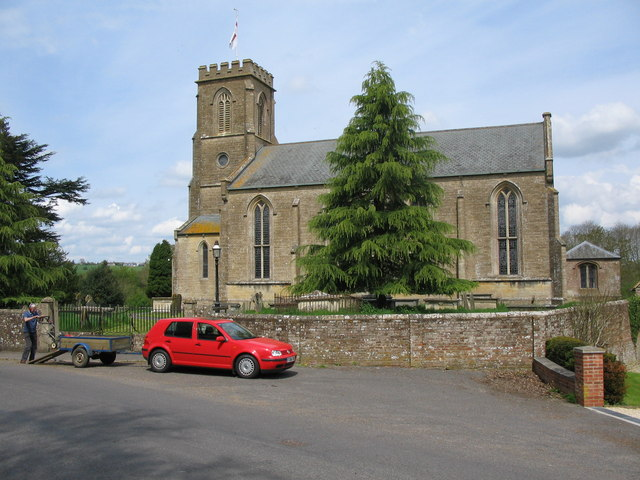
St Margaret's Church in 2006

St Margaret's, Corsley, is the Church of England parish church of Corsley in Wiltshire, England. In 1968 the church was designated as Grade II listed.

The church was built in 1833 by John Leachman on the site of an earlier church. The previous church had been dedicated to St James from the 16th to 18th century. The new building has a simple plan: a wide nave without aisles, a chancel under the same roof of Welsh slate, and a tall west tower.

Its design and layout are similar to another of Leachman's churches in Wiltshire, Christ Church, Warminster; while Christ Church has been repeatedly extended and altered throughout its history, St Margaret's is substantially unaltered and thus remains close to his original plans. There is a west gallery on four cast iron pillars, and the Royal Arms of George III. The tower has six bells, of which three are 18th-century. A clock was added to the four-stage tower around 1885.

There was a parson at Corsley in the mid-13th century. At first the church was subordinate to the parish church of St Denys at Warminster, some 2 1/2 miles (4.0 km) to the southeast, but by 1415 Corsley was an independent parish. The first record of dedication to St Margaret of Antioch is from 1786. Furnishings which survive from the earlier church are the pulpit (c. 1700), painted benefaction boards and several monuments.

Since 2007, Corsley parish – including a 1903 chapel of ease, St Mary's Church at Temple – has formed part of the Cley Hill benefice.
