= St Mary's Church, Temple, Corsley =

Coordinates: 51.2022°N 2.2516°W

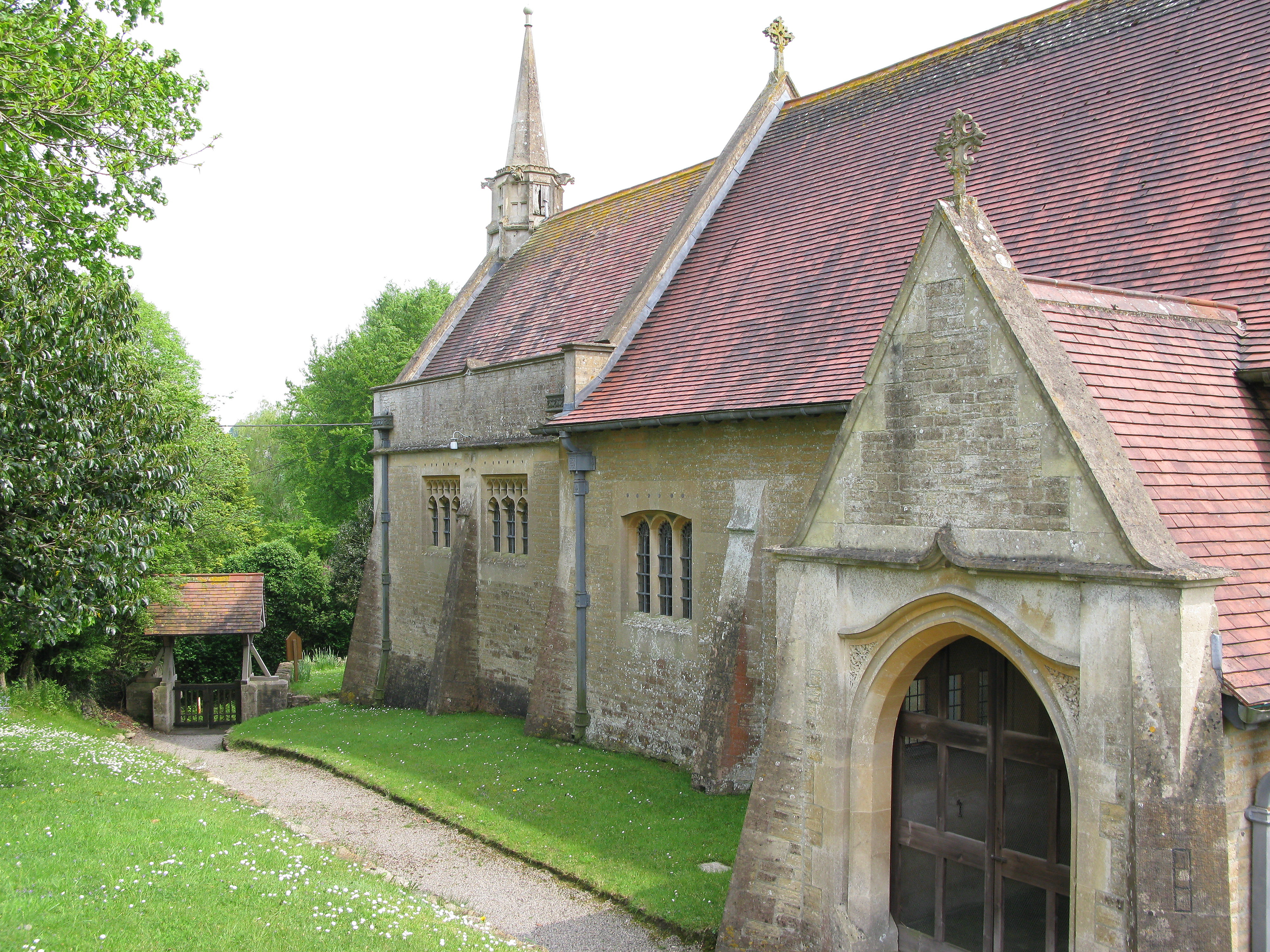
- "Arts and Crafts Gothic"

- Location in Wiltshire
- OS grid reference: ST 82519 44811
- Location: Temple, Corsley, Wiltshire
- Country: England
- Denomination: Anglican
- Website: St Mary's, Temple Corsley

History
- Founder: Mary Barton
- Dedication: Saint Mary

Architecture
- Functional status: Redundant
- Heritage designation: Grade II
- Designated: 11 September 1968
- Architect: W. H. Stanley
- Architectural type: Church
- Style: Arts and Crafts
- Completed: 1902–1903
- Construction cost: c. £5,000

Specifications
- Materials: Limestone

The Church of St Mary at Temple, Corsley, Wiltshire, England is a chapel-of-ease dating from the very early 20th century. It was commissioned and paid for by Mary Barton, of Corsley House, in memory of her husband and son. Designed in the Arts and Crafts style, the church is now in the care of the Friends of Friendless Churches. It is a Grade II listed building.

== History and description ==
The Bartons had owned land at Corsley since the 18th century, and built Corsley House in a Neoclassical style in 1814. In her will of 1899, Mary Barton left £10,000 to establish the Barton Trust, which was to build a church in memory of her husband and son. A little less than half the amount was spent on construction, with the remainder being invested to maintain the church and pay for the holding of services.

The Wiltshire Pevsner describes the church as "Arts and Crafts Gothic" in style. Julian Orbach, in his revision of Pevsner's volume, calls the church "charming". It is constructed of limestone with a tiled roof, and has a gabled north porch and a small bell-cote over the east end.

St Mary's was dependent on the parish church, St Margaret's at Corsley. In the 21st century, St Mary's was declared a redundant church and passed into the care of the Friends of Friendless Churches. Infrequent services are held by the team ministry for the area, Cley Hill Churches.
