= Dilton Marsh =

Village in Wiltshire, England

Coordinates: 51.249°N 2.214°W

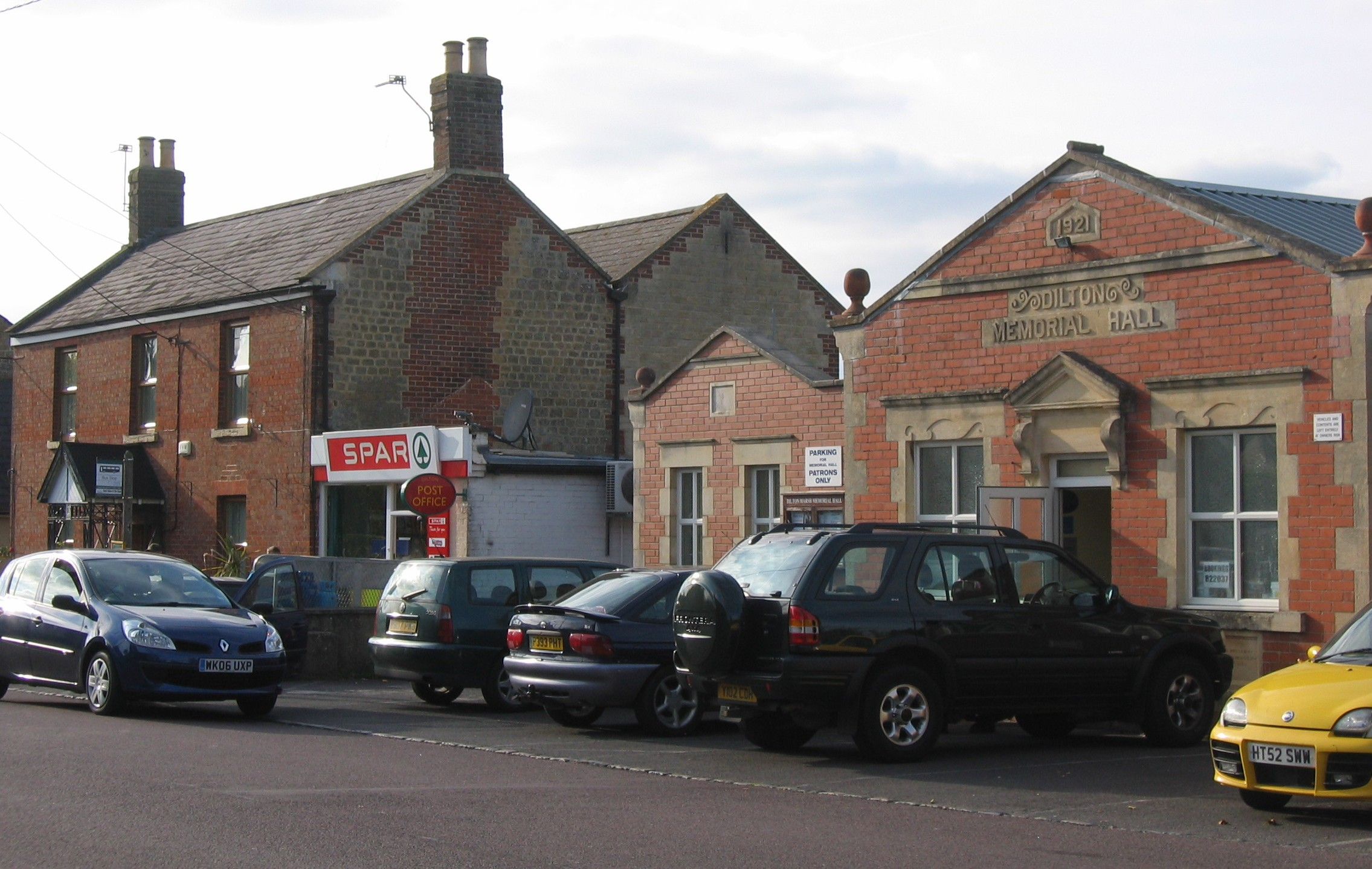
- Village centre

- Location within Wiltshire
- Population: 1,934 (in 2011)
- OS grid reference: ST850498
- Unitary authority: Wiltshire
- Ceremonial county: Wiltshire
- Region: South West
- Country: England
- Sovereign state: United Kingdom
- Post town: WESTBURY
- Postcode district: BA13
- Dialling code: 01373
- Police: Wiltshire
- Fire: Dorset and Wiltshire
- Ambulance: South Western
- UK Parliament: South West Wiltshire
- Website: Parish Council

Dilton Marsh is a village and civil parish in the far west of the county of Wiltshire, in the southwest of England. The village is about 1.5 miles (2.4 km) southwest of the centre of the town of Westbury; Dilton Marsh remains a distinct settlement with its own character and community, bounded and separated from Westbury Leigh by the Biss Brook.

The parish includes the small settlements of Penknap (east of Dilton Marsh village); Penleigh (northeast); Stormore (now contiguous with the west of the village); Clearwood (a little further west); and the rural hamlets of Fairwood (north) and Hisomley (southwest).

== Geography ==
The parish lies on greensand in the southeast, and clay in the north and west. It is low-lying, nowhere reaching a height above 250 feet (76 m).

To the west is the Somerset town of Frome, the garrison town of Warminster is to the southeast, and Wiltshire's county town of Trowbridge is to the north. The Somerset border is some 1.5 miles (2.4 km) to the west of Dilton Marsh village.

The hamlet of Stormore in the west is now part of the village. The houses along this loop road – called Stormore Common or St. Maur Common or Green in the 19th century – were once home to weavers. This area is enriched by areas of woodland, a valuable wildlife habitat, some of which belongs to the Chalcot House estate. The clay soil in this area provides fertile farmland and good quality grazing and is served by a system of traditional drainage ditches. The open aspect of this environment serves to separate Dilton Marsh and the county of Wiltshire from its neighbouring county of Somerset.

== History ==
The original settlement, Old Dilton, is some 3/4 mi (1.2 km) southeast of the present village centre at grid reference ST860490, on the banks of the Biss Brook. It now consists of a couple of farm houses and the ancient St Mary's Church. As fewer workers were needed in the local woollen industry after the introduction of greater mechanisation, many moved to the common land of the drained marsh (called Dilton's marsh) on the northern side of the ridge. By the early 19th century, Dilton Marsh had outgrown the older settlement.

Formerly there was a brick and tile works in the east of the parish, and this has influenced the overall appearance of homes in the village. Many of the houses are brick, but others are of stone rubble with red brick dressings, and in some instances the front walls only are brick.

Dilton Marsh was a tithing of the ancient parish of Westbury, and the church at Dilton (now Old Dilton) was a chapelry of the parish church at Westbury. Dilton Marsh civil parish was created in 1894, bounded on the east by the Biss Brook and on the west by the county boundary; the southern extent of the new parish was reduced in 1934 when Chapmanslade civil parish was created.

Dilton Marsh had two schools in the 19th century. A British School was built in 1866, enlarged in 1884 and 1895, and became a County school 1906. A National School was built next to the new church c. 1848, and became a County school in 1904, when it was known as the Church of England school. The schools took children of all ages until the 1930s, when those over 11 transferred to the secondary school at Westbury. In 1938, the sites were reorganised into an Infants' school at the former British School, and a Junior school at the church school.

== Notable buildings ==
Chalcot House, a Grade II* listed country house, stands in Chalcot Park in the south of the parish. The house was built in the early 18th century on the site of an older one, extensively altered in 1872 by James Piers St Aubyn, and restored in the 1970s.

Bremeridge Farmhouse, in farmland about 0.6 miles (1.0 km) north of the High Street, was thought to date from the 18th century until investigation in 2021 found within the substantial stone house a smaller timber-framed house from the second half of the 16th century.

== Religious sites ==
St Mary's Church, Old Dilton is from the 14th century, with later work in the 15th and 17th; its interior is little changed since the 18th. It was always a chapelry of All Saints', Westbury. Regular services ceased in 1900 after the building of Holy Trinity at Dilton Marsh, and the church was declared redundant in 1973. A Grade I listed building, it is now in the care of the Churches Conservation Trust.

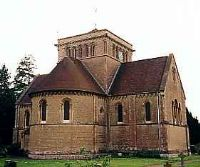
Holy Trinity Church, Dilton Marsh

Holy Trinity Church was built in the centre of the village in 1844, to designs of T.H. Wyatt in Romanesque style, partly at the cost of the Church Building Commissioners, and partly at that of Thomas Phipps of Chalcot. A parish called Dilton's Marsh was created for the new church in 1845. The building is Grade II* listed. The small church of All Saints (a tin tabernacle) at Brokerswood, to the north of Dilton Marsh, was transferred from North Bradley parish in 1973. Today both churches are part of the White Horse Team Ministry, centred on Westbury.

The church of St Philip and St James at Chapmanslade, southwest of Dilton Marsh, was built as a chapel of ease to Holy Trinity in 1867, and transferred to Corsley ecclesiastical parish in 1925.

Providence Baptist Church at Penknap was built in 1810, after a dispute at the nearby Westbury Leigh Baptist Church; soon a Sunday school was started. The building was enlarged in 1835 and continues in use. Stormore Baptist Chapel was built in 1844 as an offshoot of the Westbury Leigh church, replacing a smaller building of 1839 which was provided owing to the distance from Penknap and Westbury. This too continues in use.

== Features ==
The village High Street is 2 km (2187 yd) long. The village has a public house (the Weavers previously the Prince of Wales), fish and chip shop, and a combined farm shop, garden centre and cafe (Fairfield Farm College). The village school continues as Dilton Marsh Church of England Primary School, in new accommodation built in 1988 behind the former church school.

== Governance ==
An elected parish council is the first tier of local government. Most local government functions are carried out by Wiltshire Council, a unitary authority. The parish is part of the Ethandune electoral division, which elects one member of Wiltshire Council. For Westminster elections the parish is part of the South West Wiltshire constituency, which has been represented since 2010 by Andrew Murrison for the Conservatives.

== Transport ==
At the eastern end of the village is Dilton Marsh railway station, a simple pair of platforms on the Westbury–Warminster line, established in 1937. This is a request stop and is the subject of the John Betjeman poem Dilton Marsh Halt.

Until 1947, passengers were directed to the seventh house up the hill, Holmdale, where tickets could be bought from Mrs H. Roberts acting as a ticket agent for the Great Western Railway.
