= Avon Valley Academy =

Location
- Recreation Road; Durrington, Wiltshire, SP4 8HH; England; 51.2028°N 1.7692°W

Information
- Type: Academy
- Established: 1922 (predecessor), 1959 (current site)
- Local authority: Wiltshire Council
- Department for Education URN: 143005 Tables
- Ofsted: Reports
- Principal: Shelley Tuke
- Gender: Mixed
- Age: 11 to 16
- Enrolment: 403 (April 2023)
- Former pupils: Old Avonians
- Website: www.avonvalleyacademy.org.uk

Avon Valley Academy is a mixed secondary school in Durrington, Wiltshire, England. Earlier in its history it has been known as Durrington Senior School, Durrington Secondary Modern School, Durrington Comprehensive School, Upper Avon School and then Avon Valley College.

== History ==
The school was established in 1922 on a site in Bulford Road, and in 1944 it became a secondary modern school in line with government policy. As the school grew in the 1950s, a new building was constructed at the end of Recreation Road, at the north-eastern corner of the village, at a cost of £118,732. The new building opened on 7 September 1959, and the old site became Durrington Junior School. In the 1970s, extensive additions were made to the school buildings, and in 1974 it became a comprehensive school.

Throughout its early history the school had limited academic success and went through a period of decline in the 1990s, culminating in it being placed in "special measures" in 2000. These measures were lifted earlier than expected in 2002, and the school showed considerable sustained improvement in subsequent Ofsted reports.

The school changed its status to a foundation school in January 2009, and in September 2010 its status changed to a trust school. Since 2016 it has been an academy, part of Salisbury Plain Academies, a multi-academy trust.

In 2010, the school scored its highest overall GCSE results to date, with 43% achieving five or more GCSEs including Maths and English at grades A*-C or equivalent. This was exceeded in 2011 when 53% per cent of students achieved grades A*-C in five GCSEs or equivalent qualifications, including Maths and English. In Ofsted reports in January 2011 and March 2014 the college was rated as " 2 – Good".

The school previously operated a sixth form, but this provision was closed in July 2021 due to low student numbers. The school was then renamed Avon Valley Academy.

== Facilities ==
Facilities at Avon Valley Academy include a tented sports hall, a dance studio, a café, and a gym which is open to the public outside school hours. Adult education classes take place during the day and in the evening.

== Notable former pupils ==
- Claire Sturgess, radio presenter on Absolute Radio, and former Radio 1 presenter
