= Stonar School =

Independent school in Wiltshire, England

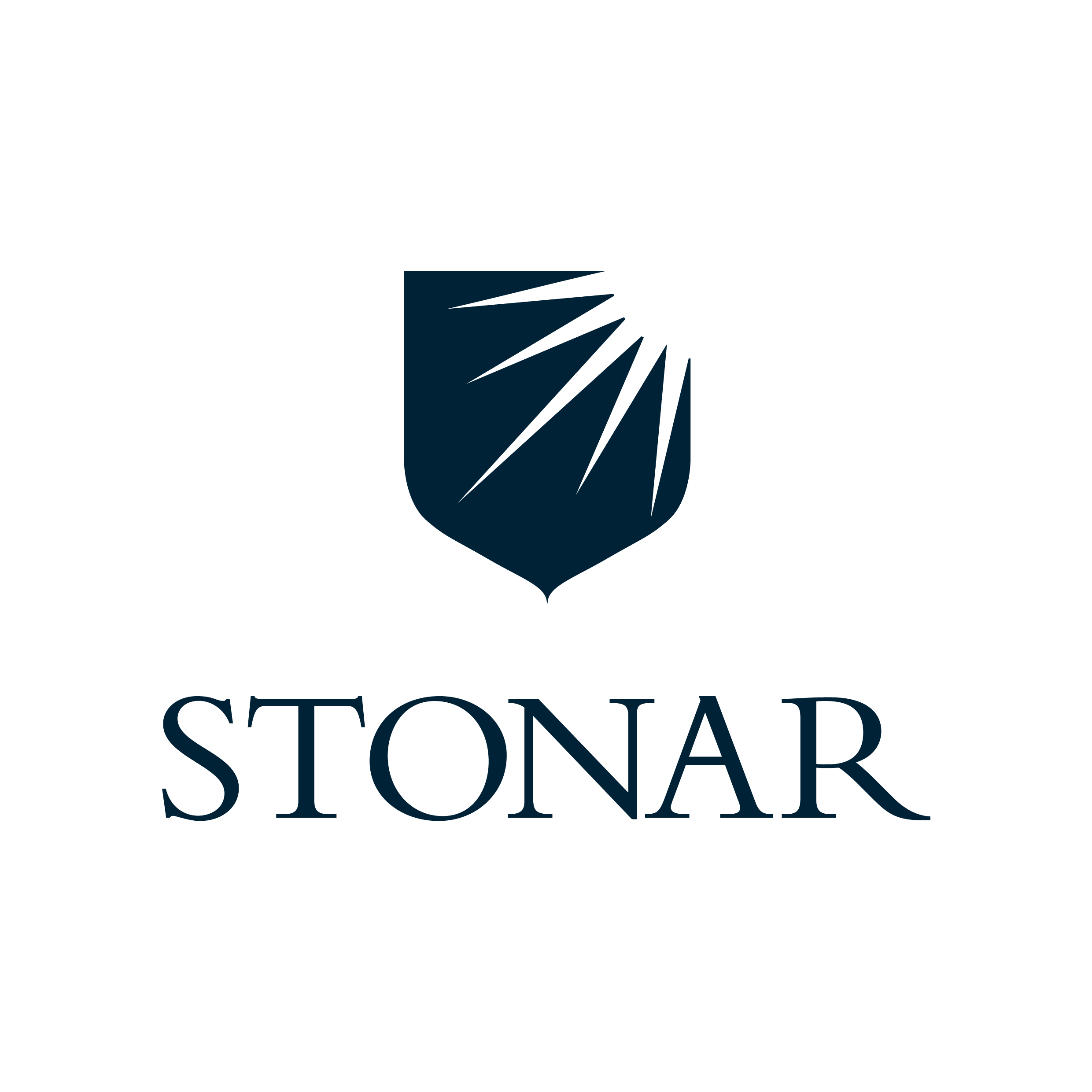

Location
- Cottles Park, Atworth; Wiltshire, SN12 8NT; England; 51.3888°N 2.2178°W

Information
- Type: Other Independent School
- Established: 1895
- Local authority: Wiltshire
- Department for Education URN: 126512 Tables
- Head teacher: Matthew Way
- Gender: Co-educational
- Age: 2 to 18
- Website: www.stonarschool.com

Stonar School, founded in 1895, is a non-denominational independent day and boarding school, at Cottles Park, near Atworth, Wiltshire, south-west England. The school occupies 80 acres of parkland and gardens in a location about 8 miles from Bath. There are about 420 pupils from 2 to 18 years old, with approximately 100 in the prep school section and 320 in the secondary section.

== History ==
The school was established in 1895 as a girls' school at Stour House, Sandwich, Kent, and adopted the Stonar name when it moved to the larger Stonar House, also in Sandwich. The school was evacuated to Cottles House when the Sandwich premises were requisitioned by the Ministry of Defence in 1939.

The school was acquired in 2013 by Globeducate, a subsidiary of American private equity firm Providence Equity, which operates over 50 schools in several countries. Boys began to be accepted by the school in 2016 and it became fully coeducational.

== Cottles House ==
The Grade II-listed Cottles House was designed by Thomas Jelly and John Palmer of Bath as a country house for Robert Hale, and built in 1775–78 on the site of an earlier house belonging to the Hale family. The name comes from the Cotel family who held the manor (also known as Little Atworth) in the 13th century.

The house was extended c.1832 by H.E. Goodridge, who also designed St Michael's church at Atworth. The result is described by Historic England as "rambling L-plan" and by Pevsner as "early 19th-century Gothick".

The room which is now the school library has a late 16th-century stone chimney piece with caryatids, which may have come from the earlier house; Pevsner states it is splendid but "much too big for the house". Elsewhere, joinery including doors and window shutters is from the early 19th century, and there are Adam-style fireplaces on the first floor.

== Equestrian education ==
Stonar offers an equestrian education alongside the academic curriculum. Facilities include an indoor school, an 80 x 40m surfaced arena, four cross-country courses and stabling for up to 65 horses and ponies. Guest trainers include Mary King.

== Notable former pupils ==
- Pamela Kirkham, 16th Baroness Berners (born 1929), hereditary peeress and former Conservative member of the House of Lords (1995-1999).
- Thorhilda Abbott-Watt (born 1955), diplomat.
- Laura Ford (born 1961), sculptor.
- The Hon Charlotte Long (1965–1984), actress.
- Romola Garai (born 1982), actress.
- Georgia Hardinge (born 1984), fashion designer.
- Holly Bodimeade (born 1997), actress.

== See also ==
- List of schools in Wiltshire
