= Fitzmaurice Grammar School =

Coordinates: 51.3434°N 2.2506°W

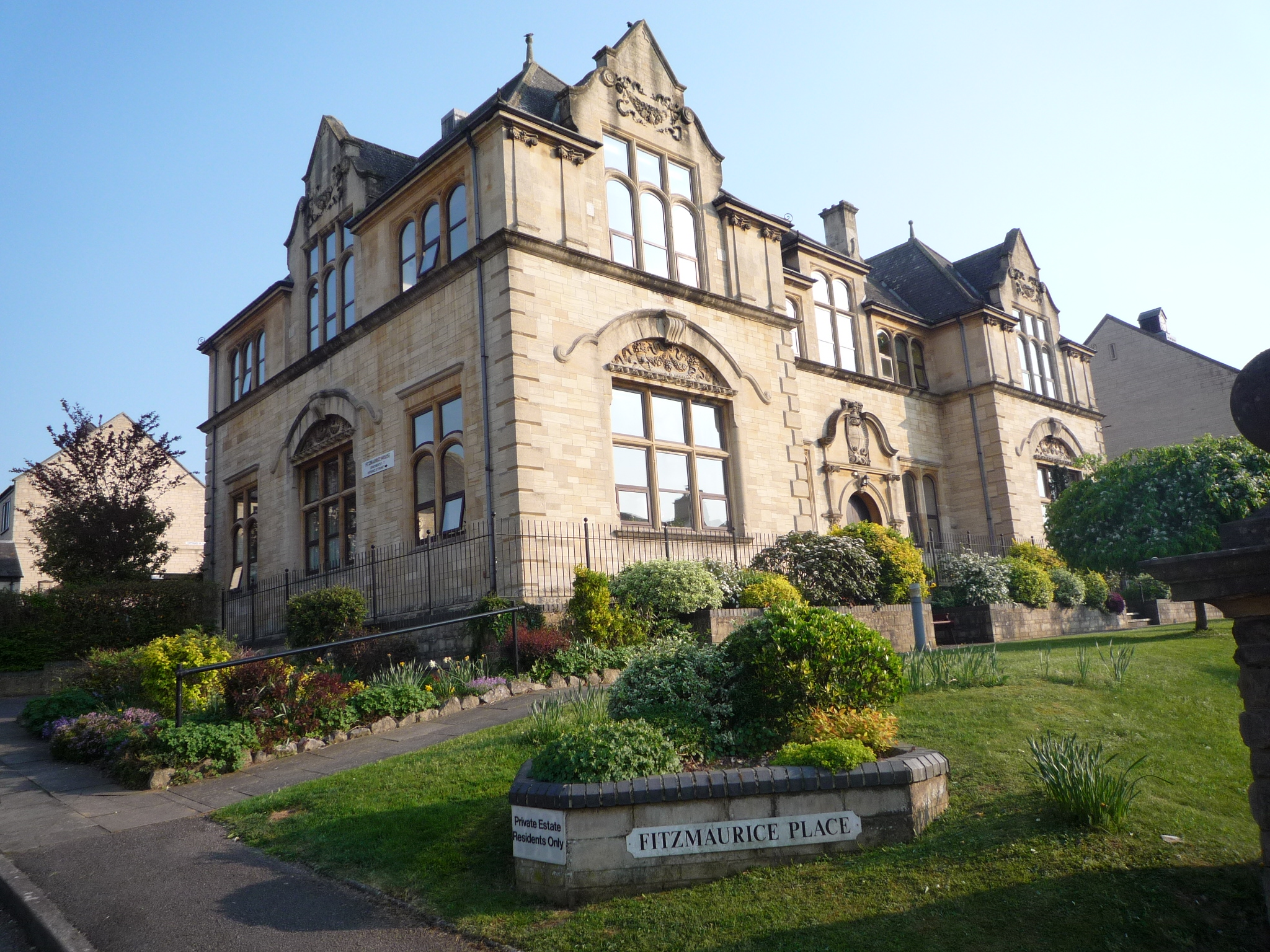
- The original building of Fitzmaurice Grammar School, now in residential use as Fitzmaurice Place

Location
- Junction Road; Bradford-on-Avon, Wiltshire; England

Information
- Former name: County School
- Type: Grammar school
- Established: 1897
- Founder: Edmond Fitzmaurice, 1st Baron Fitzmaurice
- Closed: 1980
- Local authority: Wiltshire
- Gender: Coeducational
- Age: 11 to 18

Fitzmaurice Grammar School was a grammar school in Bradford on Avon, Wiltshire, England. The school opened as the County School in 1897 with financial support from Edmond Fitzmaurice, 1st Baron Fitzmaurice. It was renamed Fitzmaurice Grammar School in 1936 after the death of Lord Fitzmaurice. The grammar school was closed in 1980 and merged with Trinity secondary modern school to form the comprehensive school called St Laurence School.

== Former pupils ==
Those educated at the Fitzmaurice Grammar school include:

- Geoffrey Copland CBE, Rector and Vice-Chancellor of the University of Westminster from 1996 to 2007
- Charlotte Long, actress

== Grammar School staff ==
When the school was closed in 1980, staff included Alistair Thomson, Doug Anderson, John Blake, Liz Buchanan, John Blowers, Noreen Brady, Joan Davis, Bob Hawkes, Sally Burden, Virginia Evans, Margaret Gadd, Stuart Ferguson, Harry Haddon, Margaret Hore. Tony Hull, Peter Knight, Marilyn Maundrell, Margaret Osbourne, Lynne Powell, Sid Johnson, Gerald Reid (Headmaster), Ken Revill, Diane Satterthwaite, Geoff Swift, Meg Tottle-Smith, Joan Van Ryssen, John Warburton, Enid Wicheard and Tim Wilbur.

== Fitzmaurice Primary School ==
A primary school, known since 1985 as the Fitzmaurice Primary School, uses some of the former classrooms of the grammar school.
