= Durrington, Wiltshire =

Village and civil parish in Wiltshire, England

Coordinates: 51.199°N 1.775°W

Durrington
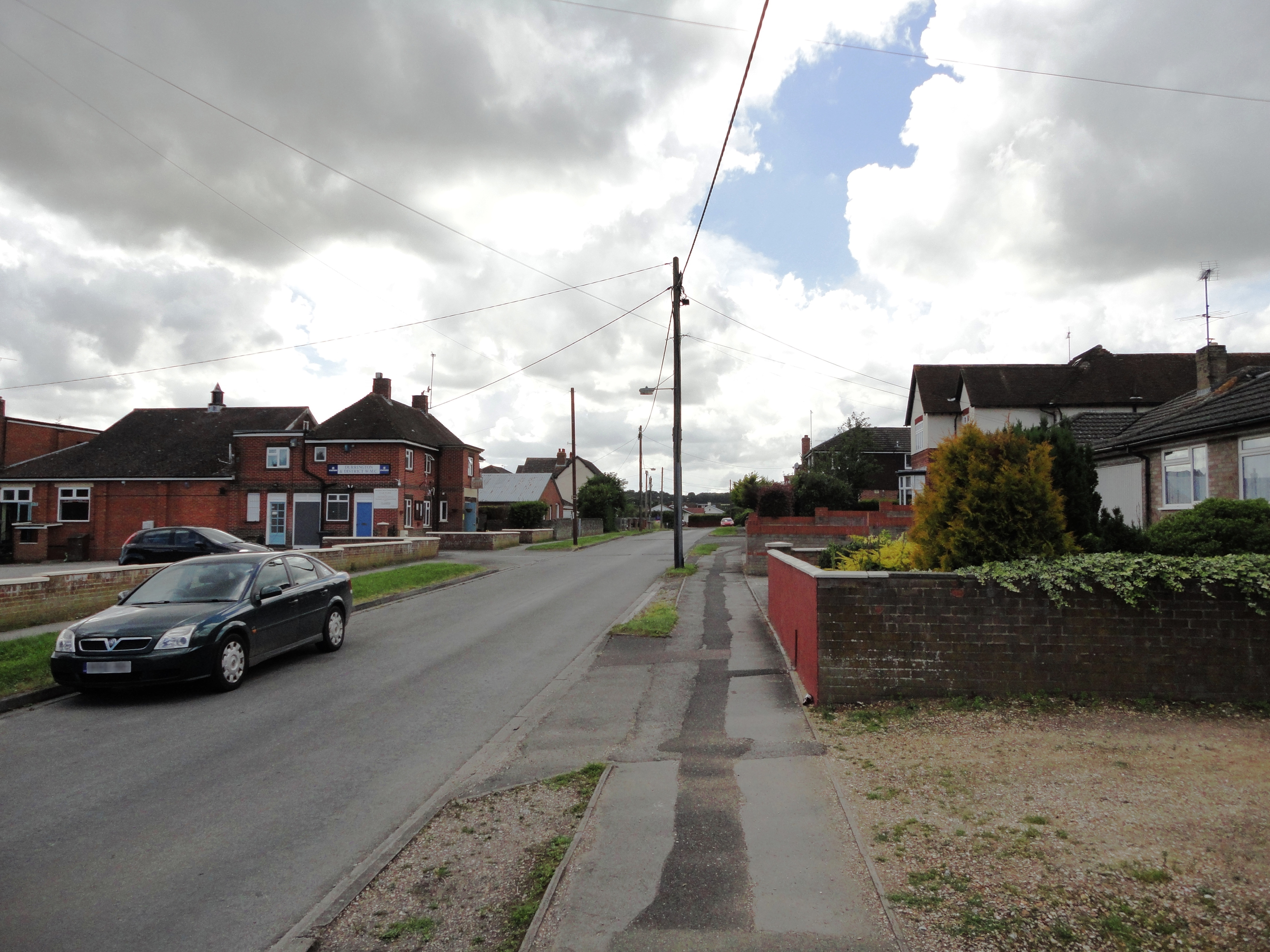

- Location within Wiltshire
- Population: 7,379 (in 2011, includes Larkhill)
- OS grid reference: SU158444
- Civil parish: Durrington
- Unitary authority: Wiltshire
- Ceremonial county: Wiltshire
- Region: South West
- Country: England
- Sovereign state: United Kingdom
- Post town: Salisbury
- Postcode district: SP4
- Dialling code: 01980
- Police: Wiltshire
- Fire: Dorset and Wiltshire
- Ambulance: South Western
- UK Parliament: East Wiltshire
- Website: Town Council

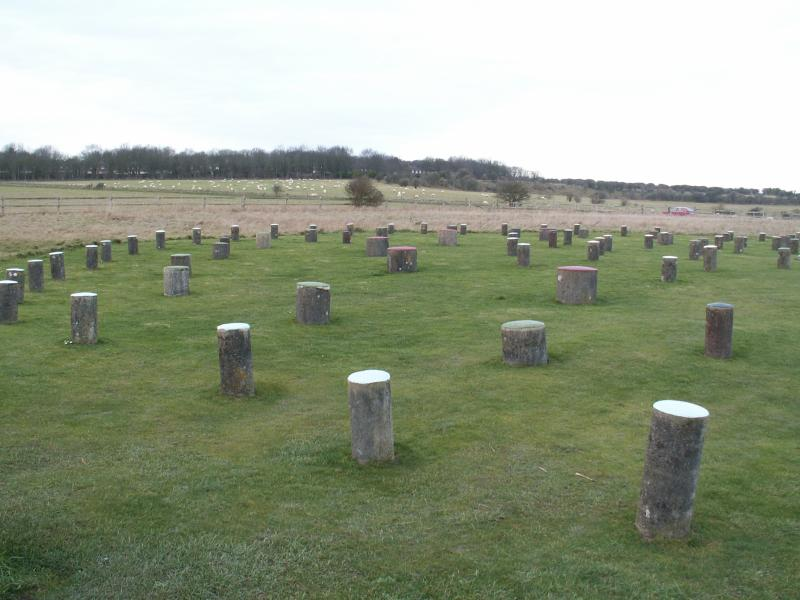
Woodhenge lies within the parish boundary

Durrington is a village and civil parish in Wiltshire, England. The village lies about 2 miles (3.2 km) north of the town of Amesbury, 10 miles (16 km) north-northeast of the city of Salisbury, and 2 1/2 miles (4 km) northeast of the Stonehenge monument. It is on the eastern part of Salisbury Plain, the largest remaining area of chalk grassland in northwest Europe. The parish includes the hamlet of Hackthorn, on the northern outskirts of Durrington, and the military settlement of Larkhill, 1.5 miles (2.4 km) to the west.

Durrington has a long history, dating back to the Neolithic era. Two ancient sites lie in the parish: Durrington Walls and Woodhenge. The parish is in the Upper Avon valley, with the River Avon forming its eastern boundary; Durrington village is close to the river. The toponym is derived from the Old English Deor ingtūn, meaning 'farm or settlement connected with Deor', Deor being a personal name.

The village's population of about 5,000 is served by several shops, two pubs, schools covering all levels of compulsory education, and a swimming pool and fitness centre.

== History ==
=== Prehistory ===
The area had been occupied since Neolithic times but not necessarily continuously. The parish contains two important Neolithic sites: Durrington Walls and Woodhenge. Archaeological excavations indicate that the Neolithic inhabitants of the village kept a large number of pigs, with bone evidence suggesting that the pigs were unusually large for the time. This may be because inhabitants fattened them up to sell them to visitors to nearby Stonehenge.

=== Middle Ages ===
There is little evidence of Saxon occupation, but this may be because buildings and utensils of that time were made of wood, so little survives. The Domesday Book recorded two estates in 1086, having land for one plough team and with 5 acres (2.0 ha) of meadow. These two estates may represent the later two manors.

West End manor was part of the king's estate of Amesbury until 1120 but East End manor had different origins, being privately owned by Patrick de Salisbury. At this time each manor was using the open field system, but over time this system evolved into a two, and then a three, field system. The population also began increasing and in 1377 there were 139 poll tax payers making Durrington one of the most populous villages in the hundred of Amesbury.

In 1390, Durrington's manors had a rental income of £40 which gradually decreased to £29 8s 6d in 1521.

In 1399 the West End manor was given as an endowment of the newly created Winchester College, and an excellent collection of documents on its management and usage has been preserved by the college. They have also provided the name for College Road.

In 1405 the Durrington Fire occurred, the cause of which is unknown. It is widely theorised that a lamp falling onto a bale of hay caused it to ignite, or possibly that a house fire got out of control. Whatever the cause, the fire resulted in the destruction of most of the West End because most of the houses were built in an unusually close proximity to one another. Many of the West End families were left homeless, but were generously compensated by Winchester College.

There were notable problems in collecting rent from tenants in the 15th and 16th centuries. Winchester College, as lord of the manor, had to pardon a great deal of rent after failing to collect it for several years. In 1461, the college decided its only option was to lower rents, cutting the rent on virgates from 20s to 16s and half-virgates from 9s to 7s, yet problems persisted. In 1480, a local tenant, John Langford, was pardoned £58 because he did not have goods from which the proceeds could be raised.

=== Reformation to 19th century ===
The village remained a prosperous farming community although, apart from the church, there is little visual evidence before the 17th century. In 1610 East End Manor was extended with an east-west range, changing it into an L–shaped building. This new extension was used to shelter Catholic priests during the Reformation, with a number of priest holes being found here. There are 17th-century houses of timber and cob, with thatched roofs, surviving in College Road, High Street and Church Street. In 1676 the population was said to be 334 people. Despite evidence of a substantial amount of building work, mainly farmhouses, in the 18th century the village did not really increase in size and remained concentrated around its two main streets.

One of the Salisbury Plain's last great bustards was shot in Durrington by a shepherd in 1802. He gave it to a Mr Moore, who commissioned a painting of it by a Mr Dudman.

== Governance ==
Durrington has a fifteen-member parish council with responsibility for local issues, including setting an annual precept (local rate) to cover the council's operating costs and producing annual accounts for public scrutiny. The parish council evaluates local planning applications and works with the local police, Wiltshire Council officers, and neighbourhood watch groups on matters of crime, security, and traffic. The council's role also includes initiating projects for the maintenance and repair of parish facilities, as well as consulting with Wiltshire Council on the maintenance, repair, and improvement of highways, drainage, footpaths, public transport, and street cleaning. Conservation matters (including trees and listed buildings) and environmental issues are also the responsibility of the council.

In 2008, the parish council voted to declare itself a town council. This did not affect its functions or powers.

Wiltshire Council, a unitary authority, has the wider responsibility for providing services such as education, refuse collection, and tourism. Durrington town (east of the A345) elects one councillor for the Durrington electoral division, while the rest of the parish is part of the Avon Valley division which also elects one councillor.

For Westminster elections, the parish is part of the East Wiltshire constituency. The seat is held by Danny Kruger, who stood for the Conservatives in the 2024 general election and defected to Reform UK in 2025.

== Geography ==
The development of the village throughout the 20th century has been shaped by the presence of the military in the area. Through this, the parish population has grown to that of a town, mainly due to the presence of the Larkhill military camp. However, the lack of a cohesive infrastructure means that this cannot be considered an urban development.

The civil parish covers 2,696 acres (1,091 hectares), and has long east-west and short north-south axes, stretching from the downs west of the River Avon to the watershed of the Avon and Till rivers in the east. Most of it is chalk downland, but there is some alluvial gravel deposited around the river. The village was formerly in two parts based around two manors: East End and West End. The East End was in the vicinity of Bulford Road, while the West End was based at the High Street. These streets are aligned north and south and the church is set between them, in the north of the village. The East/West dichotomy was brought to an end with the construction of a large council estate centred on Coronation Road during the 1950s between the East and West Ends. Therefore, it would be better to say that the village is, nowadays, divided into a North End and South End: the North contains the old, pre-20th-century village, with expensive, mainly thatched houses, whereas the South contains the council houses (many of which are now privately owned).

== Demographics ==
The 2011 Census recorded a population of 7,379, which includes people living in both the village and Larkhill. Larkhill alone had a population of 2,358, meaning that the population of the village proper was 5,021.

According to the 1801 census, the population of Durrington was 339. The number remained relatively steady during the 19th century, rising to 477 in 1851 before falling back to 393 in 1891. This radically changed at the start of the 20th century, when much of the parish was acquired by the army. The first tented army camp in the parish was set up in 1899, eventually becoming the permanent camp of Larkhill. Census data from then on includes the population of the whole parish, including the military camp. The result was the parish population doubled between 1901 and 1911 and then trebled during the First World War. The population continued to increase as both the camp and village grew, eventually reaching 7,182 in 2001, seventeen times larger than that of 1901.

Population of Durrington
| Year | 1801 | 1811 | 1821 | 1831 | 1841 | 1851 | 1861 | 1871 | 1881 | 1891 |
|---|---|---|---|---|---|---|---|---|---|---|
| Population | 339 | 318 | 370 | 467 | 465 | 477 | 440 | 420 | 392 | 393 |
| Year | 1901 | 1911 | 1921 | 1931 | 1941 | 1951 | 1961 | 1971 | 1981 | 1991 |
| Population | 427 | 897 | 3,005 | 3,846 | n/a | 5,784 | 4,737 | 6,734 | 6,729 | 6,929 |
| Year | 2001 | | | | | | | | | |
| Population | 7,182 | | | | | | | | | |

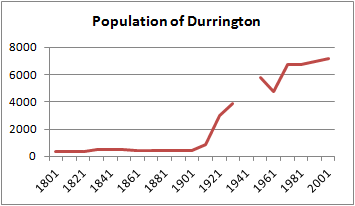

== Amenities ==
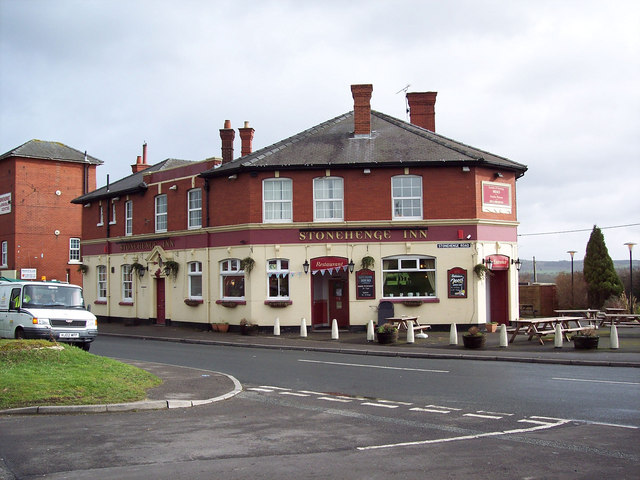
The Stonehenge Inn

=== Shops ===
The village has three small convenience stores: a Nisa, a Sainsbury's Local and also a Tesco Express that opened in 2008. It has an Esso filling station with a small shop and repair yard. There is also the hardware shop Bits & Pieces, a furniture shop and several hairdressers and barber's shops. Palmer's paper shop in the middle of Durrington.

=== Banking ===
No bank branches remain in the village. The Post Office closed in 2005; a Post Point opened in the village hall in October 2010 but it does not offer banking facilities. A Post Point exists as of 2019 in the Nisa but it does not offer banking facilities.

=== Education ===
The village has three schools providing all levels of compulsory education. Durrington All Saints CofE Infant School provides lower primary education (reception to year 2); Durrington CofE VC Junior School provides upper primary education (years 3 to 6); and Avon Valley Academy provides secondary education (years 7 to 11).

=== Public houses ===
There are two public houses: the Plough and the Stonehenge Inn, at opposite ends of the village.

=== Leisure ===
The village has a small swimming pool and fitness centre, which is next to the secondary school. There is also a recreation ground with football pitch, two tennis courts, a park, BMX jumps and skateboarding facilities.

== Transport ==
The A345 Salisbury to Swindon road runs along the western side of the village, and the A303 trunk road runs a mile to the south. Salisbury Reds buses provide a half-hourly service west to Larkhill and south to Amesbury and Salisbury, and an hourly service north to Pewsey, Marlborough and Swindon. The nearest railway stations are Salisbury and Grateley on the West of England Main Line and Wessex Main Line to the south, and Pewsey on the Reading to Taunton line to the north.

== Churches ==
=== Church of England ===
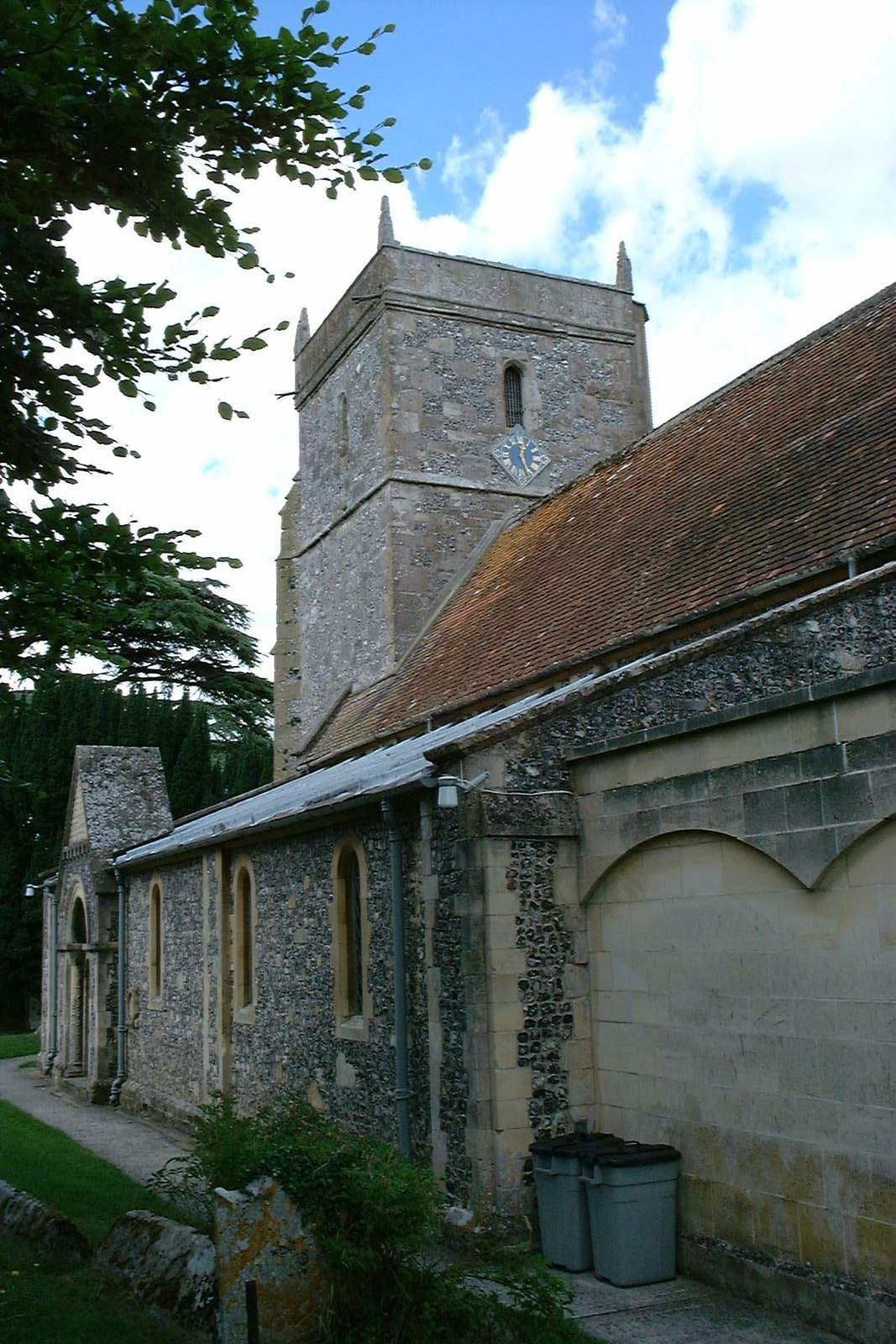
All Saints' Church

The Church of England parish church existed by 1179, when it was confirmed to the Fontrevist Amesbury Priory. The church is likely to have had a dedication but by 1763 it was unknown. The building's earliest surviving features include its Norman south doorway and three-bay late-12th-century arcade.

The chancel was rebuilt in the 13th century and the Perpendicular gothic west window of the nave was added in about 1500. The 15th-century tower has six bells, of which five are 17th-century. In 1851 the church was rebuilt to designs by the Gothic Revival architect J.W. Hugall and dedicated to All Saints. Hugall retained original features including the 13th-century Norman lancet windows on the south side of the chancel, and added the north aisle.

The church is a Grade II* listed building. The parish is now part of the Avon River Team ministry.

Larkhill has a garrison church, St Alban the Martyr, built in brick in 1938.

=== Congregational ===
Durrington had a small Presbyterian congregation in the 1660s and 1670s. No nonconformists were recorded in the parish in 1783. An independent chapel had opened by 1824 and was rebuilt or altered in 1860. It may have been Wesleyan Methodist in about 1880 but by 1899 it was Congregationalist. In 1905 it was replaced by a new chapel in Bulford Road, which since 1965 has been a member of the Evangelical Fellowship of Congregational Churches. Additionally there is a small evangelical church called Durrington Community Church, which meets weekly in the Village Hall; this has been running since 1991.

=== Jehovah's Witnesses ===
Durrington has had an active community of Jehovah's Witnesses since the 1960s. At first they met in various rented properties, such as the former Conservative Hall in College Road. During 1999 the function room to the rear of the Stonehenge Inn was purchased and a new, purpose built Kingdom Hall was constructed on the site the following year. The Congregation now has approximately 85 active members.

=== Roman Catholic ===
Our Lady Queen of Heaven Roman Catholic church was opened in 1960. It was still open in 1995, but has since closed.

== Sources ==
- Burgess, John (2001). Wiltshire and Its History. John Burgess Publications.
- A.P. Baggs; Jane Freeman; Janet H. Stevenson (1995). Crowley, D.A. (ed.). Victoria County History: A History of the County of Wiltshire, Volume 15: Amesbury hundred; Branch and Dole hundred. British History Online. pp. 93–105.
- Hare, J. N. (1999). "Growth and Recession in the Fifteenth-Century Economy: The Wiltshire Textile Industry and the Countryside". The Economic History Review. 52 (1): 1–26. doi:10.1111/1468-0289.00116. JSTOR 2598529.
- Hewlett, Maurice (1921). Wiltshire Essays. Oxford University Press.
- Pevsner, Nikolaus (1975) [1963]. Cherry, Bridget (ed.). The Buildings of England: Wiltshire. Harmondsworth: Penguin Books. pp. 228–229. ISBN 0140710264.
