= St Laurence School =

Location
- Ashley Road; Bradford-on-Avon, Wiltshire, BA15 1DZ; England; 51°21′08″N 2°15′33″W

Information
- Type: Academy
- Motto: Care, Inspire, Succeed
- Religious affiliation: Church of England
- Founder: Edmond Fitzmaurice
- Department for Education URN: 137057 Tables
- Headteacher: Tim Farrer
- Gender: Coeducational
- Age: 11 to 18
- Houses: Ashley, Budbury, Conigre, Huntingdon, Westfield
- Former names: Fitzmaurice Grammar School; Trinity Secondary Modern
- Diocese: Salisbury
- Website: www.st-laurence.com

St Laurence School is a coeducational secondary school and sixth form in Bradford-on-Avon, Wiltshire, England with academy status since August 2011. Besides Bradford on Avon, the school takes pupils from Atworth, Monkton Farleigh, Winsley, Limpley Stoke, South Wraxall, Bradford Leigh, Trowbridge and Melksham. It is in the northwest of the town, off the road towards Little Ashley.

== History ==
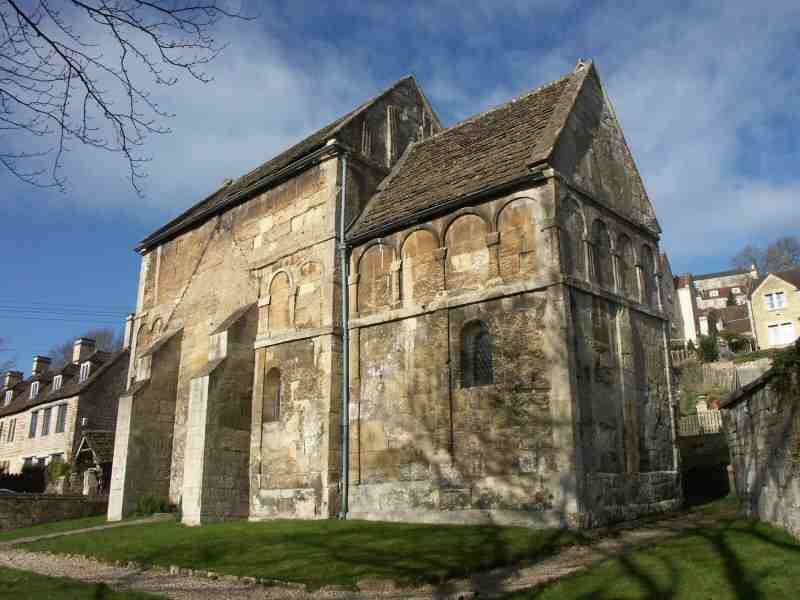
The school takes its name from St Laurence's Church, Bradford-on-Avon, a Saxon church in the town

The school was founded in 1980 as a result of the merger of Fitzmaurice Grammar School and Trinity secondary modern school (named after Holy Trinity Church, Bradford-on-Avon), opening on the Trinity site. The school is named after the historically-important Saxon church, also known as St Laurence's Church, Bradford-on-Avon.

Under the specialist schools programme of 1997–2010 the school had Arts College status, resulting in extra investment in drama, music and dance facilities.

The school's teaching departments are spread across numerous buildings on the school site. The site also has a large sports hall and several sports courts, pitches and playing fields. A lecture theatre was built in 2007 and was joined by a state-of-the-art independent learning centre in 2011.

In October 2005, a helium balloon launched at a school fete on 24 September 2005 was found in Karesuando, Sweden. Karesuando is 1,430 miles (2,300 km) from the school, and information about the school and a prize was sent to the finder.

== Wiltshire Music Centre ==
The Wiltshire Music Centre opened on site at St Laurence in 1998. Private and curriculum-based music lessons are held in the classrooms and teaching rooms in this building; and school collective worships, exam presentations, and other special events are held in its main auditorium. The Music Centre also contains a recording studio.

== Roman villa remains ==
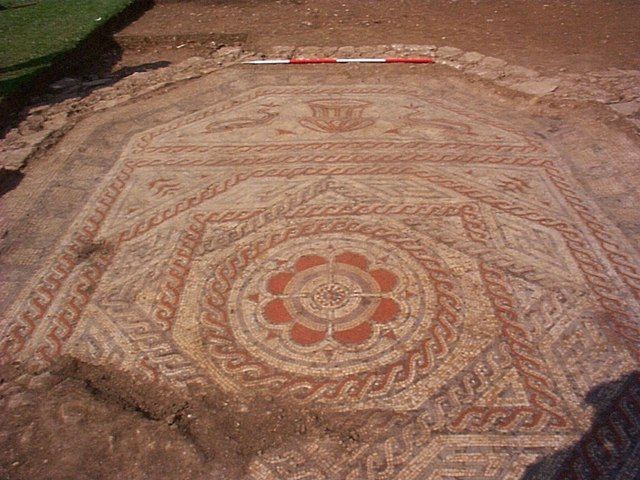
Roman mosaic revealed during excavations

Aerial photographs and minor archaeological excavations in 1976 indicated the presence of the remains of a Roman villa underneath the school's sports fields. A more major excavation in 2003 uncovered Roman era floor mosaics and walls once belonging to this villa, along with a stone structure believed to have once been part of an early Christian baptistery.

== Academic performance ==
In 2016, 79% of the school's GCSE pupils achieved grades 5 A* to C including English and Mathematics. Currently there are 1358 pupils attending the school, across key stages 3–5.
