= Chapmanslade =

Village in Wiltshire, England

Coordinates: 51.230°N 02.247°W

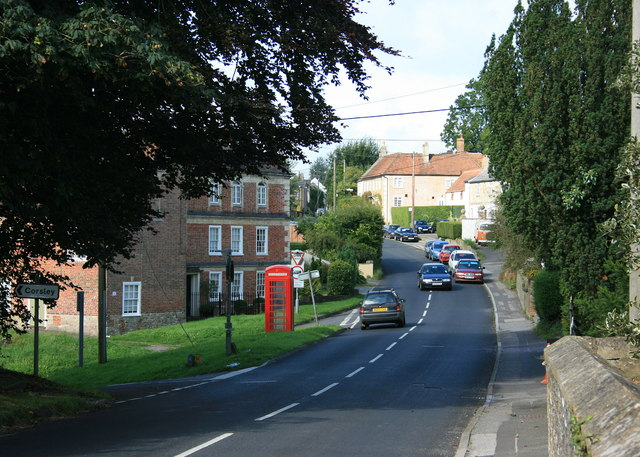
- High Street

- Location within Wiltshire
- Population: 643 (in 2011)
- OS grid reference: ST825478
- Unitary authority: Wiltshire
- Ceremonial county: Wiltshire
- Region: South West
- Country: England
- Sovereign state: United Kingdom
- Post town: WESTBURY
- Postcode district: BA13
- Dialling code: 01373
- Police: Wiltshire
- Fire: Dorset and Wiltshire
- Ambulance: South Western
- UK Parliament: South West Wiltshire
- Website: Parish Council

Chapmanslade is a village and civil parish in the county of Wiltshire, in the southwest of England. The parish is on the county border with Somerset and includes the hamlets of Huntenhull Green, Short Street and Thoulstone. The village lies about 3.5 miles (6 km) from each of three towns: southwest of Westbury, northwest of Warminster, and east of Frome (in Somerset).

== Features ==
The village High Street is a section of the A3098 between Westbury and Frome and is some 2 km long. Near the centre of the village are the village school and the Church of England parish church.

== History ==
The civil parish of Chapmanslade was established in 1934 from parts of Corsley, Dilton Marsh and Upton Scudamore parishes. Prior to this, the village High Street formed the boundary between Corsley (historically part of Warminster) and Dilton Marsh (historically part of Westbury).

The name Chapmanslade has referred to the village since the 14th century at least. A 'chapman' was a travelling merchant or pedlar, and a 'slade' was a valley or glade. The principal local industries were weaving and agriculture, but the employment profile of the village is now very similar to Southern England generally.

== Places of worship ==
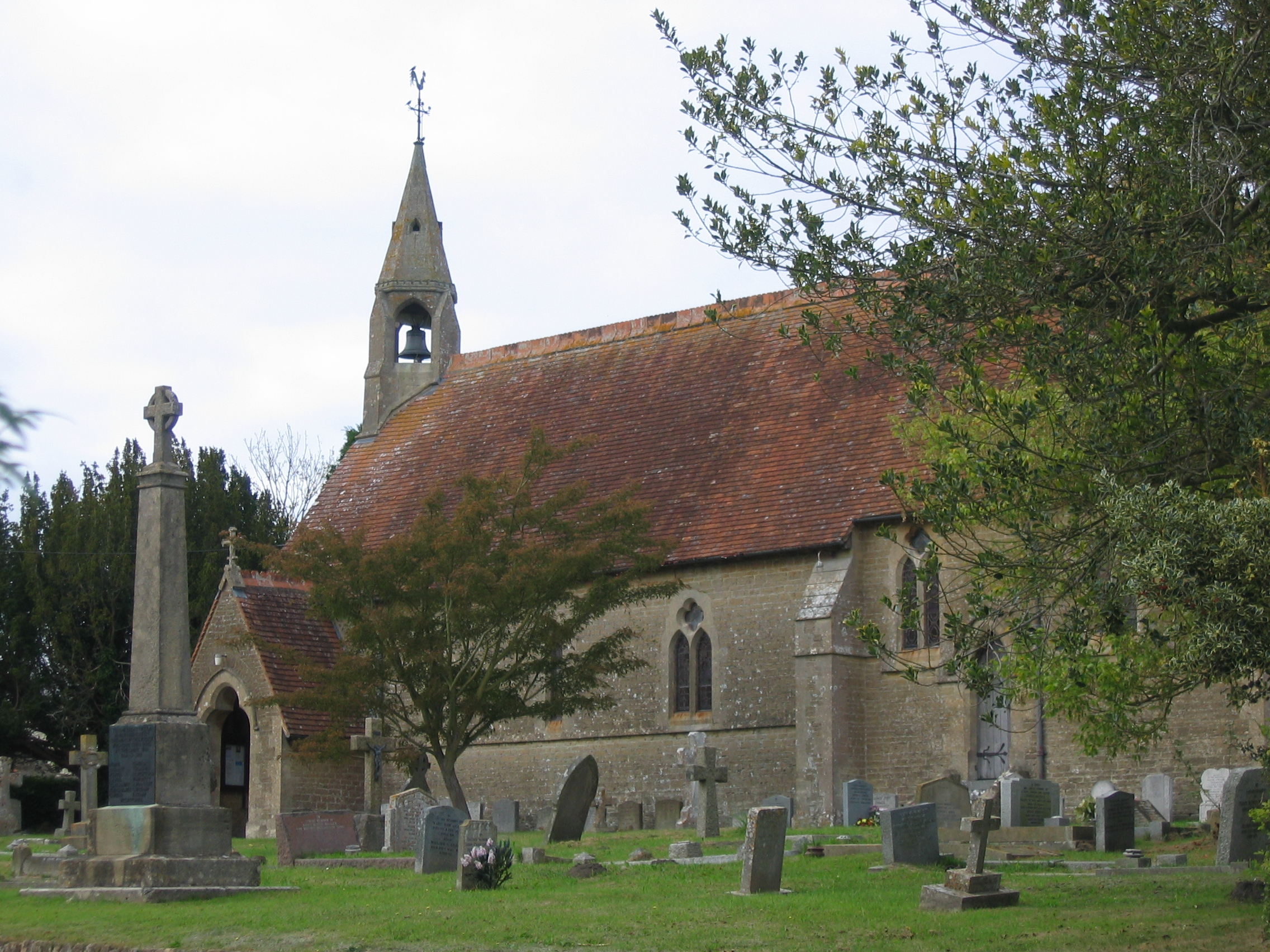
Church of St Philip & St James

The Church of England parish church of St Philip and St James was built in 1866–1867 to designs by G. E. Street, in the Gothic Revival style. The interior has its original fittings, designed by Street and of high quality, with stained glass by Clayton and Bell. Originally a chapel of ease to Dilton Marsh church, Chapmanslade was transferred to the Corsley ecclesiastical parish in 1924, which now forms part of the Cley Hill benefice.

A Congregational gathering was formed at Chapmanslade in 1761 and built a chapel in 1771. In the mid-19th century? a disagreement between the minister and congregation caused the entire congregation to join the Baptists at their chapel. A new chapel, a stone building in the Gothic style, was built at the east end of the village in 1867. In the later 20th century this building was sold and became a private house.

Particular Baptists came to Chapmanslade in 1777 and built a chapel in brick and stone on Wood Lane, north of the High Street. Sometime in the 20th century this too became a private house.

== Amenities ==
The village's primary school is next to the church and was designed by the same architect as the church, G. E. Street. It opened in 1872 as a National School, was enlarged in 1894, and has a further modern extension. Control passed to the county council in 1906, and the school has Voluntary aided status.

The village has a pub, the Three Horseshoes.

A mile to the east of the main village is Thoulstone Park, formerly a golf club and hotel which closed in 2001, now a restaurant and wedding venue. It has been used by the Sunrise Celebration music festival.

== Governance ==
Most local government services are provided by Wiltshire Council, which has its offices in Trowbridge. Chapmanslade also has its own elected parish council of five members, which is almost entirely a consultative body.

The village is represented in Parliament by the MP for South West Wiltshire, Andrew Murrison, and in Wiltshire Council by Fleur de Rhé-Philipe.

== Notable people ==
Clara Grant (1867–1949), educational pioneer and social reformer, was born in the village.

Kate French, modern pentathlon gold medallist at the 2020 Tokyo Olympics for Great Britain and Northern Ireland, lives in the village.
