= Corsley =

Hamlet in Wiltshire, England

Coordinates: 51.219°N 2.247°W

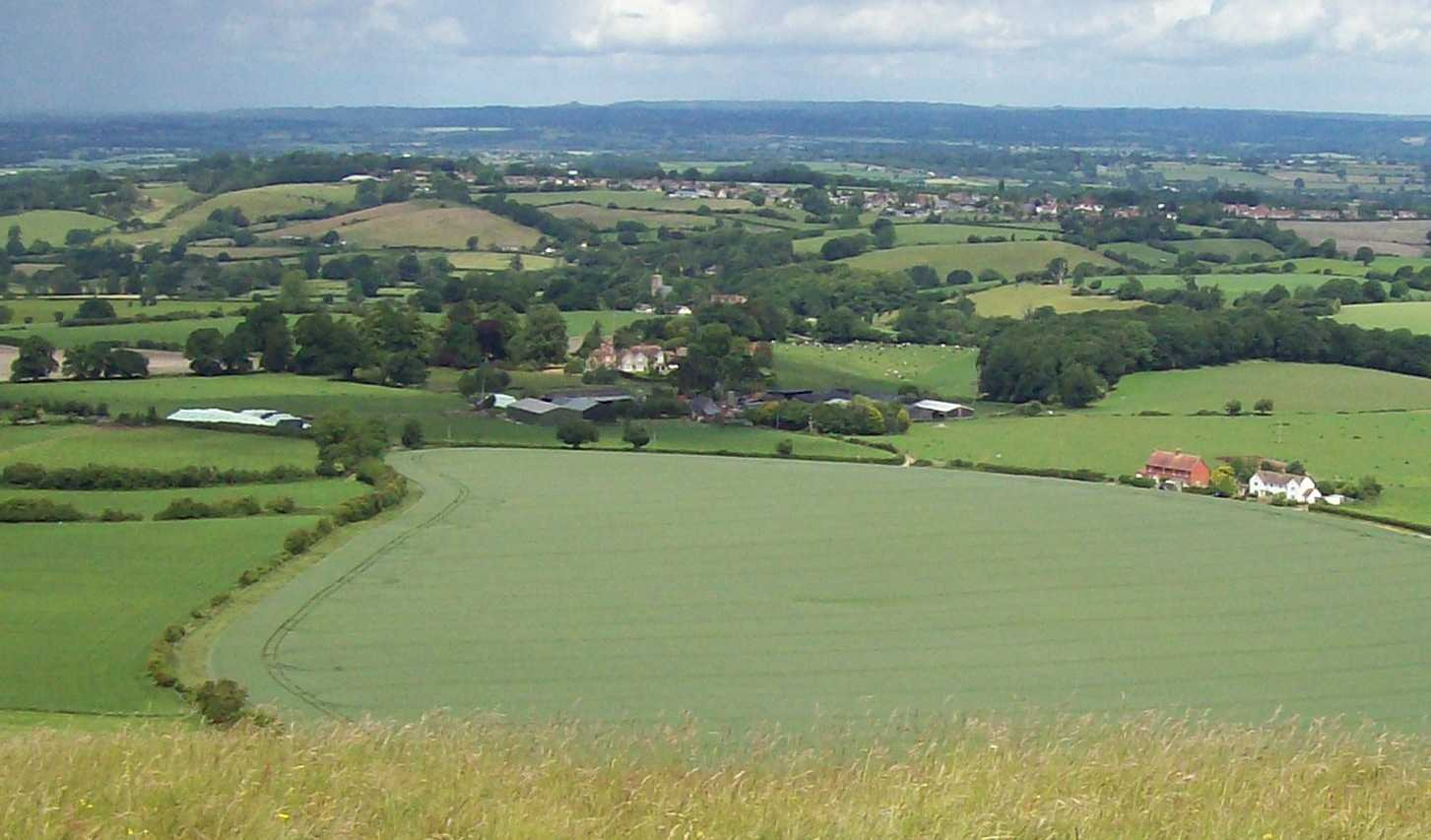
- Corsley from Cley Hill

- Location within Wiltshire
- Population: 681 (in 2011)
- OS grid reference: ST828467
- Civil parish: Corsley
- Unitary authority: Wiltshire
- Ceremonial county: Wiltshire
- Region: South West
- Country: England
- Sovereign state: United Kingdom
- Post town: Warminster
- Postcode district: BA12
- Dialling code: 01373
- Police: Wiltshire
- Fire: Dorset and Wiltshire
- Ambulance: South Western
- UK Parliament: South West Wiltshire
- Website: corsleyandthebridge.co.uk

Corsley is a hamlet and civil parish 3 miles (5 km) west of Warminster in Wiltshire, England. The parish is on the county border with Somerset; the Somerset town of Frome is about 3 miles (5 km) to the northwest. The largest settlement in the parish is Corsley Heath, which is on the A362 Warminster-Frome road.

The parish has several small settlements. Lye's Green is between Corsley and Corsley Heath (not to be confused with Lye Green, in Westwood parish near Bradford on Avon). Lane End is west of Corsley Heath on the A362, while the small hamlet of Sturford is to the east. South of the main road are Dertfords, Longhedge, Whitbourne Moor (formerly Lower Whitbourne), Temple (formerly Middle Whitbourne) and Whitbourne Springs (formerly Upper Whitbourne).

Much of the parish was originally part of the Longleat Estate and part of the Longleat Safari Park lies within the parish boundary. Cley Hill, owned by the National Trust, is in the east of the parish.

== History ==
The Domesday Book says of Corsley "Azor holds one hide in Corselie... Here is ploughed land... and the mill pays 40 pence. And the wood is a furlong in length and half a furlong broad. It is worth 20 shillings." In 1232, Henry III granted the manor of Corsley to Godfrey de Crawcumb, with the right to hold an annual fair on 20 July (the feast of St Margaret) and a weekly market on Fridays.

By about 1250, there were four separate manors, Corsley, Little Corsley, Huntenhull, and Whitbourne.

In 1544, after the monastery at Maiden Bradley had been dissolved, the manor of Whitbourne was sold and the chapel of St John there disappeared. In 1579, Little Corsley was bought by Walter Hungerford of Farleigh Hungerford Castle. In 1539, the manor of Corsley was granted to Edward Seymour, who in 1547 leased it to his steward John Thynne. In 1560 Thynne was himself granted the manor of Corsley; he built or rebuilt a house at Corsley, part of which survives as Manor Farm, and lived there from 1563 to 1568 while rebuilding Longleat House.

After the death of Thynne in 1580, his widow, known as Dame Dorothy, lived at Manor Farm as a dower house. At the same time, Sir Walter Raleigh, who was in disgrace, was living at a farm near St Margaret's parish church, Corsley. He and his brother Carew Raleigh used to visit Dame Dorothy, who married Carew Raleigh.

The boundaries of the civil parish were redrawn in 1934. The northern part (including Corsley Mill and Huntenhull) was transferred to the new parish of Chapmanslade, while in the south a portion of Longleat's park and woodland was transferred from Warminster to Corsley.

A National School was built at Corsley in 1847 on land owned by Lord Bath, near the church. Children of all ages attended until 1931, when pupils over 11 transferred to the new Avenue Senior School at Warminster. In 1944 the school became a Church of England aided school; it closed in 2007 owing to falling pupil numbers. The building became a conference centre, and was a temporary home for Frome's Steiner School from 2012 to 2014.

== Churches and chapels ==
There are two Church of England churches in the parish. Both are served by the Cley Hill team ministry.

The parish church of St Margaret, Corsley, was built in 1833 by John Leachman on the site of an earlier church.

St Mary's Church at Temple was built as a chapel of ease in 1899–1903, in Arts & Crafts Gothic style, after Mary Barton (d. 1878) of Corsley House left money in her will to provide the church in memory of her husband and son. Around 2015 the church was taken into the care of the Friends of Friendless Churches.

Wesleyan Methodists were active from 1769 and a chapel was built at Lane End in 1849, with a schoolroom added late in the century. The chapel closed in 1966 and is in residential use.

The parish had a Baptist congregation by the 1780s, and a chapel was built at Temple in 1811. Money to pay for the land and the building was raised by the preacher, Richard Parsons of Chapmanslade, who continued as pastor until his death in 1853. Around the middle of the century the chapel was enlarged, and its height increased; the interior was refurbished in 1882. As of 2016 the chapel remains in use as Whitbourne Baptist Chapel.

== Notable buildings ==
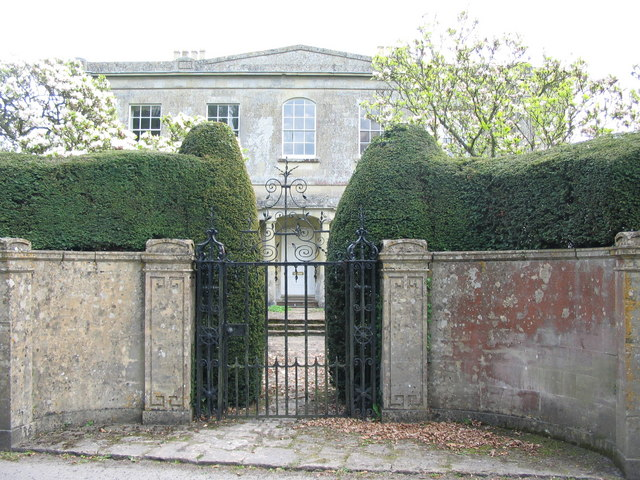
Corsley House, 2006

Corsley House, a Grade ll listed building, was built for the Barton family in 1814, designed by the Bath architect John Pinch the elder as a Greek Revival mansion around a previous house. Later residents include (from the 1890s) Maud Davies, whose Life in an English Village, published in 1909, is a pioneering sociological study.

Sturford Mead was built in 1820 by John Pinch in the Greek revival style for H.A. Fussell, a clothier and dyer from Frome. It was sold to the Longleat estate in 1854; in the 1930s it was occupied by Henry Thynne, 6th Marquess of Bath, then Viscount Weymouth, and his first wife Daphne. The gardens were designed by Russell Page.

== Local government and MP ==
Corsley elects a parish council. Most local government services are provided by Wiltshire Council, which has its offices in nearby Trowbridge. The village is represented in Parliament by the MP for South West Wiltshire, Andrew Murrison and in Wiltshire Council by Fleur de Rhé-Philipe.
