= Henry Hare =

Henry Hare may refer to:

- Henry Hare (architect) (1861–1921), English architect
- Henry Hare, 3rd Baron Coleraine (1693–1749), English antiquary
- Henry Hare, 2nd Baron Coleraine (1636–1708), English politician and antiquary
