= Hugh Hare =

Hugh Hare may refer to:

- Hugh Hare (MP for Bletchingley) (1668–1707), English translator and politician
- Hugh Hare, 1st Baron Coleraine (1606–1667), English courtier
- Hugh Hare (MP, died 1620) (1542–1620), member of parliament for Haslemere, and for Bramber
