= Governor Phipps =

Governor Phipps, or Phips, may refer to

- George Phipps, 2nd Marquess of Normanby (1819–1890), Colonial Governor of Nova Scotia, Queensland, New Zealand and Victoria between 1838 and 1863
- Spencer Phips (1685–1757), Acting Governor of the Province of Massachusetts Bay from 1749 to 1753 and from 1756 to 1757
- William Phips (1651–1695), Governor of the Province of Massachusetts Bay from 1692 to 1694
- William Phipps (Governor of Bombay) (died 1748), Governor of Bombay from 1722 to 1729
