= Lefley =

Lefley is an English surname. Notable people with this surname include:

- Bryan Lefley (1948–1997), Canadian ice hockey player and coach
- Chuck Lefley (1950–2026), Canadian ice hockey player
- Gary Lefley (born 1954), British political activist
