= Tottenham Grammar School =

Location
- White Hart Lane; Tottenham, Middlesex (Greater London), N17 8HL; England
- Coordinates: 51.607°N 0.0875°W

Information
- Type: Voluntary aided grammar school, and later comprehensive
- Established: 1631; 395 years ago
- Founder: Sarah, Duchess of Somerset
- Closed: 1988 (grammar in 1967)
- Local authority: Middlesex then Haringey
- Gender: Boys
- Age: 11 to 18
- Houses: Somerset, Morley, Bruce and Howard
- Fate: Became Somerset School in 1967 then closed in 1988
- Website: http://www.tottenhamgrammarschool.co.uk

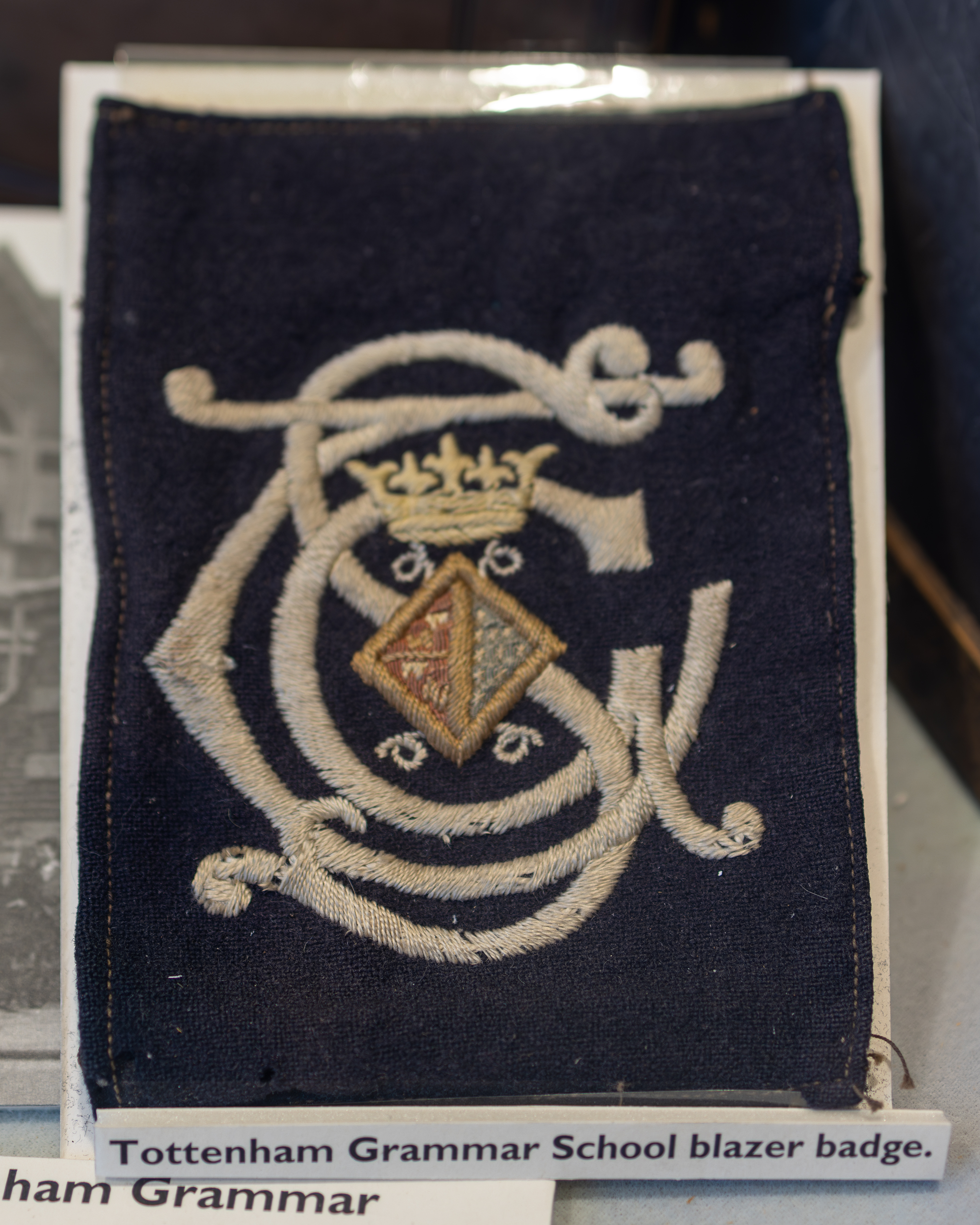
Blazer badge of Tottenham Grammar School

Tottenham Grammar School (TGS) was a grammar school in North London, with local football connections. Its history goes back beyond the 1631 bequest by the Duchess of Somerset. It closed in 1988, but it created the Tottenham Grammar School Foundation.

== History ==
A Tottenham school had existed for centuries. Its origins are unclear, possibly dating back to 1456 but in 1631 a legacy was left by Sarah, Duchess of Somerset to extend the existing school house and provide free education to poor children from Tottenham. She left The duchess left £250 to enlarge Tottenham's "parish school" because it was the family seat of her third husband Henry Hare, 2nd Baron Coleraine. She left £1,000 to buy apprenticeships and £1100 to create an endowment to pay the wages of a schoolmaster and an usher.

=== Tottenham Hotspur ===
In 1882, pupils from the school and from St John's Presbyterian School formed Hotspur F.C. at All Hallows' Church. The name came from the Hotspur Cricket Club, of which boys from the school were members. This football club subsequently became Tottenham Hotspur F.C.

=== Former building ===
In 1910, the old school was knocked down apart from the Masters House (later to be destroyed by bombs in World War II). The new building on Somerset Road, built by Middlesex County Council, was used as the school until 1937. The new building was opened by Algernon Seymour, 15th Duke of Somerset on 12 October 1910, and cost £10,327. The school had four houses - Somerset, Morley, Bruce and Howard.

In 1971 it became the Education Department of Haringey Council.

=== New building ===
On 26 February 1938 due to increased numbers at the school, a site was opened on Creighton Road near White Hart Lane by Middlesex County Council. It housed 450 boys. In the early part of the war, at the time of the Blitz, the boys were evacuated to Chelmsford, to be taught at King Edward's Grammar School in the afternoons. The boys lived around the village of Writtle, west of Chelmsford; some also went to Hatfield Peverel, specifically Hatfield Peverel Priory.

From 1941, once the Blitz had finished (10 May 1941). An Army Cadet Corps was formed, along with an Air Training Corps in 1942 - 1571 Squadron, now known as Aylward Squadron.

=== V2 explosion ===
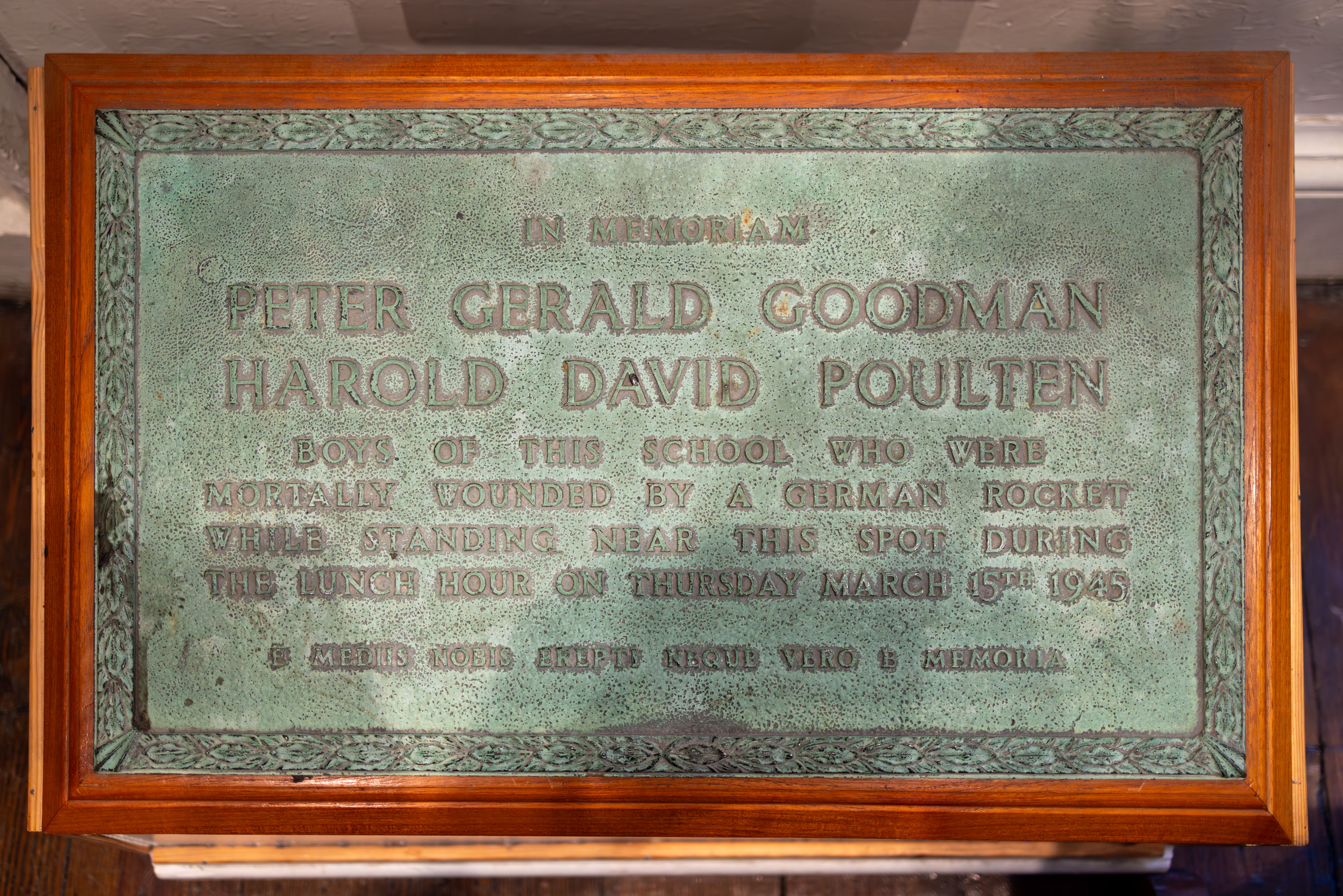
Memorial to the two boys killed in the V-2 rocket attack

On 15 March 1945, a V-2 rocket landed on the corner of White Hart Lane and Queen Street, killing two fourth-year boys, with another losing his right arm.

=== New buildings ===
In 1960 new buildings opened for the sixth form and laboratories. By this time the school had 700 boys.

== Comprehensive ==
In 1967 the school merged with the Rowland Hill Secondary Modern School in Lordship Lane, which was named after Sir Arthur Rowland Hill and had opened in 1938, to form the Somerset School, a voluntary-controlled boys' comprehensive school. The school's houses were now Baxter, Coleraine, Drayton and Hill.

Due to falling numbers this school closed in 1988, by which time it was situated on one site on White Hart Lane. The Lower School was demolished to become a housing estate on Somerset Close. The Upper School was demolished in 1989, becoming a housing estate on Somerset Gardens, and a site for Middlesex University - halls of residence for the Tottenham Campus, which closed in 2005 (the former St Katharine's College teacher training college).

== Foundation ==
The sale of the school provided £9.1 million, which was used to set up a charitable foundation, the Tottenham Grammar School Foundation.

== Notable former pupils ==
- George Petros Efstathiou, Professor of Astrophysics University of Cambridge
- Martin Benson, actor
- James A. Beckford, sociologist of religion
- Sir Patrick Bishop, Conservative MP from 1950 to 1964 for Harrow Central
- David V. Day, British theologian, teacher, and former Principal of St John's College, Durham
- Eric Deakins, Labour MP from 1970 to 1974 for Walthamstow West, and from 1974 to 1987 for Walthamstow
- Sir Archibald Forster, Chairman and Chief Executive from 1983 to 1993 of Esso UK, Manager from 1964 to 1969 of the Fawley Refinery, and President from 1985 to 1986 of the Institution of Chemical Engineers, and from 1988 to 1990 of the Institute of Petroleum
- Ralph Harris, Baron Harris of High Cross, Head from 1957 to 1988 of the Institute of Economic Affairs
- Prof William James, Professor of Botany from 1959 to 1967 at Imperial College London
- Gary Lefley, general secretary for the Campaign for Nuclear Disarmament
- Adrian Love, radio DJ
- Dr Geoff Manning CBE, physicist, and Director from 1979 to 1986 of the Rutherford Appleton Laboratory
- John Mastel CVO CBE, police officer
- Sir Alec Merrison, physicist and Vice-Chancellor from 1969 to 1984 of the University of Bristol
- Mick Newmarch, Chief Executive from 1990 to 1995 of Prudential Corporation plc
- Laurence Payne, actor known for Sexton Blake (TV series)
- Roy Perry, Conservative MEP from 1999 to 2004 for South East England, and father of Caroline Nokes
- Sir Leslie Plummer, Labour MP from 1951 to 1963 for Deptford
- Arthur Blaikie Purvis, Canadian industrialist and war purchasing agent
- Sir Owen Williams, civil engineer who designed the first section of the M1
- Mike Winters, comedian (Mike & Bernie Winters)

== Other "Tottenham" schools ==
- Tottenham County School, a co-educational grammar school on Selby Road - became Tottenham School in 1967, then White Hart Lane School in 1983 when it merged with the Wood Green Comprehensive School
- Tottenham High School for Girls on High Road, became the High Cross Girls' School in 1967
