= William Phipps (governor of Bombay) =

British governor of Bombay (c. 1681–1748)

William Phipps (c. 1681 – 21 August 1748) was the Governor of Bombay from 9 January 1722 to 10 January 1729.

He was the son of Thomas Phipps, a successful London merchant who acquired an estate at Heywood near his native town, Westbury, Wiltshire. Among William's brothers was James Phipps of Cape Coast Castle. In due course William retired to Heywood, where he died.

A marble bust of Phipps by Robert Taylor is in the parish church at Westbury.

Government offices
Preceded by Charles Boone	Governor of Bombay; 9 January 1722 - 10 January 1729	Succeeded by Robert Cowan
