= Sarah Seymour, Duchess of Somerset =

English heiress and benefactor

Her Grace The Duchess of Somerset
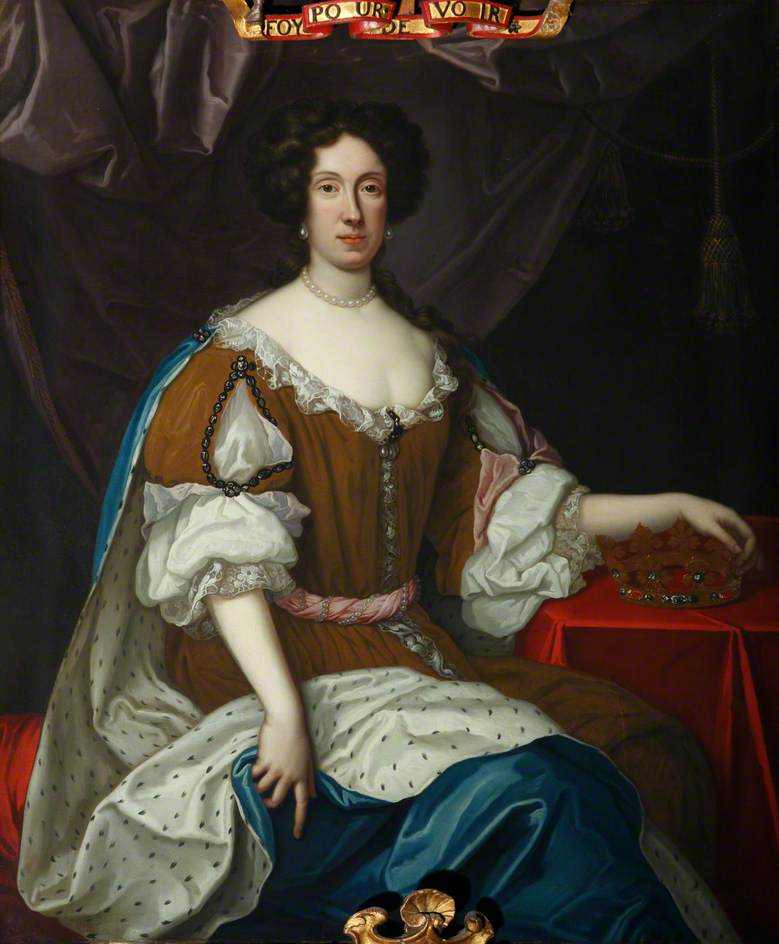
- Born: 1631
- Died: 2 November 1692 (aged 60–61)
- Known for: philanthropic will
- Spouse(s): George Grimston; John Seymour, 4th Duke of Somerset; Henry Hare, 2nd Baron Coleraine
- Children: none survived
- Parent(s): Sir Edward Alston; Susanna Hudson Hussey

Sarah Seymour, Duchess of Somerset born Sarah Alston (1631 – 2 November 1692) was an English heiress and benefactor. She married three times including to the Duke of Somerset. She died childless leaving sundry generous legacies. She established Tottenham Grammar School and created the almshouses in Froxfield. She has a memorial in Westminster Abbey.

== Life ==
Seymour was born in 1631 her parents were Sir Edward Alston, physician, and importantly Susanna Hussey. Her mother had been born Susanna Hudson and her previous husband had been Jasper Hussey. Hussey had been a London fishmonger and he had left significant and valuable property in Billingsgate. Seymour had just one sibling who was also a daughter. Her father was a fellow of the College of Physicians, and president from 1655 until 1666. At the Restoration he was knighted by Charles II (3 September 1660).

Sarah's first marriage was to George, the son of Sir Harbottle Grimston, 2nd Baronet. They were given Verulam House, near St Albans as a home. It was a love match that ended tragically; their two sons died and then George died in 1655. On 5 December 1661 Sarah's father married her to John the son of William Somerset who was the heir apparent to be the 4th Duke of Somerset. Her father paid £10,000 as a dowry to the Seymour family but he negotiated her independence and a personal income of £300 per year for his daughter. Notably there were additional clauses to cover the possibility that Sarah became a widow. The marriage was a financial success but otherwise it was a disaster. William liked drinking and gambling and Sarah was a non-conformist.

In 1660 Sarah's sister Mary died, which left her as the only surviving heir when her father died in 1669. Sir Edward Alston left her a very wealthy woman with the freedom to do with it as she pleased.

In December 1671 Sarah and John became the Duchess and Duke of Somerset and this rise in station required additional expense. They had a household to maintain including Salisbury House. In 1673 Sarah petitioned the King with regard to her husband's unreasonable behaviour and they lived apart until William's death in 1675. Her father's foresight was now apparent as the pre-nuptial agreement had specified that Sarah would retain the rank of duchess and have access to her husband's estates irrespective of any later marriage - and that marriage took place three months later.

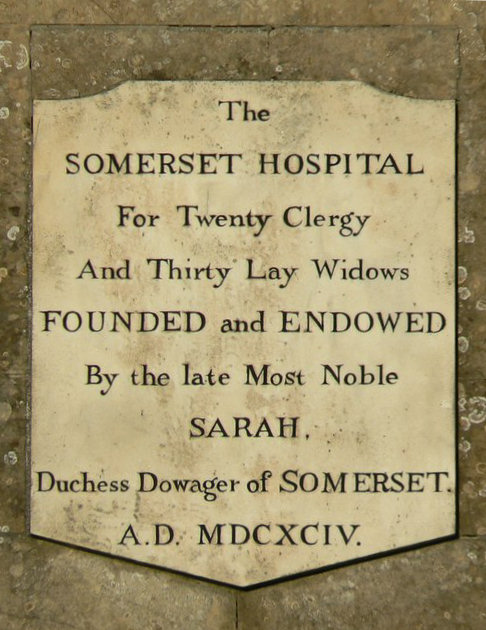
Dedication plaque

She married again to Henry Hare, 2nd Baron Coleraine who became her third husband. This marriage was not successful and they became estranged.

== Death and legacies ==
Sarah was buried in Westminster Abbey where there is a substantial memorial which cost £39. This memorial has been visited annually by pupils of Tottenham Grammar School to give thanks for her legacy. Sarah left £250 to extend the existing school house and provide free education to poor children from Tottenham. She chose this "parish school" because it was the family seat of her third husband. Sarah left £1,000 to buy apprenticeships and £1,100 to create an endowment to pay the wages of a schoolmaster and an usher. The school was operational until 1988. There is a substantial charity that remains that supports education in Haringay called the Tottenham Grammar School Foundation.

When the duchess died in 1694, her will included two bequests relevant to Froxfield. The Broad Town charity was to help young men with their education or to enter apprenticeships. It is now the Broad Town Trust, and since 1990 it has been open to young women applicants as well as young men.

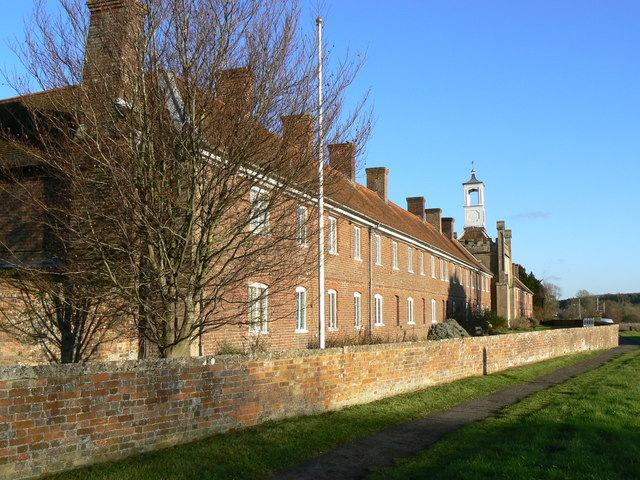
The Somerset Hospital

The Duchess' will required that almshouses and a chapel should be built in the village of Froxfield for 30 widows of whom a portion were to be widows of clergy. The chapel was to receive £10 a year to pay a clergyman to say daily prayers and every Christmas each of the widows was to receive a new gown.

Her estate of Froxfield Manor was given as an endowment to the almshouses which were called the Duchess of Somerset's Hospital. One of the trustees of the Duchess's will was her brother-in-law, Sir Samuel Grimston, 3rd Baronet, who refused to convey the prescribed lands and income to the hospital until he was ordered to do so by the Court of Chancery. The original almshouses are built of brick around a quadrangle, with the chapel in the centre.
