= Baron Coleraine =

Barony in the Peerage of the United Kingdom

- Blazon: Arms: Argent a saltire Azure between four cocks Proper.; Crests: Issuant from a chaplet of maple leaves Vert a demi salmon Proper.; Supporters: Dexter: a Basenji Dog; Sinister: a Kid, both proper
- Creation date: 16 February 1954
- Creation: Third
- Created by: Queen Elizabeth II
- Peerage: United Kingdom
- First holder: Richard Kidston Law, 1st Baron Coleraine
- Present holder: James Peter Bonar Law, 3rd Baron Coleraine
- Heir presumptive: the Hon. Andrew Bonar Law
- Status: Extant
- Seat: The Dower House
- Motto: LEX TUA MEDITATIO MEA (Thy law my thought)

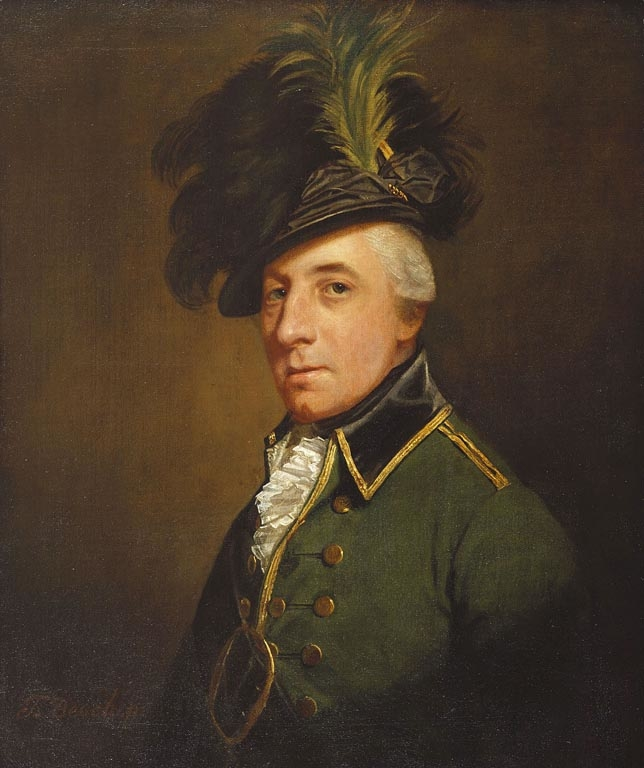
George Hanger, 4th Baron Coleraine.

Baron Coleraine is a title that has been created three times, twice in the Peerage of Ireland and once in the Peerage of the United Kingdom.

The first creation came in the Peerage of Ireland in 1625 for the courtier Hugh Hare. This creation became extinct on the death of the third Baron in 1749.

The second creation came in the Peerage of Ireland in 1762 in favour of Gabriel Hanger, Member of Parliament for Maidstone and Bridgwater. The third Baron represented East Retford, Aldborough and Mitchell in the House of Commons. The fourth Baron was a soldier, politician and eccentric. The title became extinct on his death in 1824.

The third creation came in the Peerage of the United Kingdom in 1954 when the Conservative politician Richard Law was made Baron Coleraine, of Haltemprice in the East Riding of the County of York. He was the youngest son of the former Prime Minister Bonar Law. As of 2021 the title is held by the first Baron's grandson, the third Baron, who succeeded in 2020.

The family seat is The Dower House, near Sunderlandwick, East Riding of Yorkshire.

== Barons Coleraine, first creation (1625) ==
- Hugh Hare, 1st Baron Coleraine (1606–1667)
- Henry Hare, 2nd Baron Coleraine (1636–1708)
  - Hon. Hugh Hare (1668–1707)
- Henry Hare, 3rd Baron Coleraine (1694–1749)

== Barons Coleraine, second creation (1762) ==
- Gabriel Hanger, 1st Baron Coleraine (1697–1773)
- John Hanger, 2nd Baron Coleraine (1743–1794)
- William Hanger, 3rd Baron Coleraine (1744–1814)
- George Hanger, 4th Baron Coleraine (1751–1824)

== Barons Coleraine, third creation (1954) ==
- Richard Kidston Law, 1st Baron Coleraine (1901–1980)
- James Martin Bonar Law, 2nd Baron Coleraine (1931–2020)
- James Peter Bonar Law, 3rd Baron Coleraine (born 1975)

The heir presumptive to the peerage is the present holder's uncle, the Hon. Andrew Bonar Law (born 1933), whose son and heir, and the last heir-in-line to the title, is Richard Pitcairne Bonar Law (born 1963).
