= James Townsend (British politician) =

British politician (1737–1787)

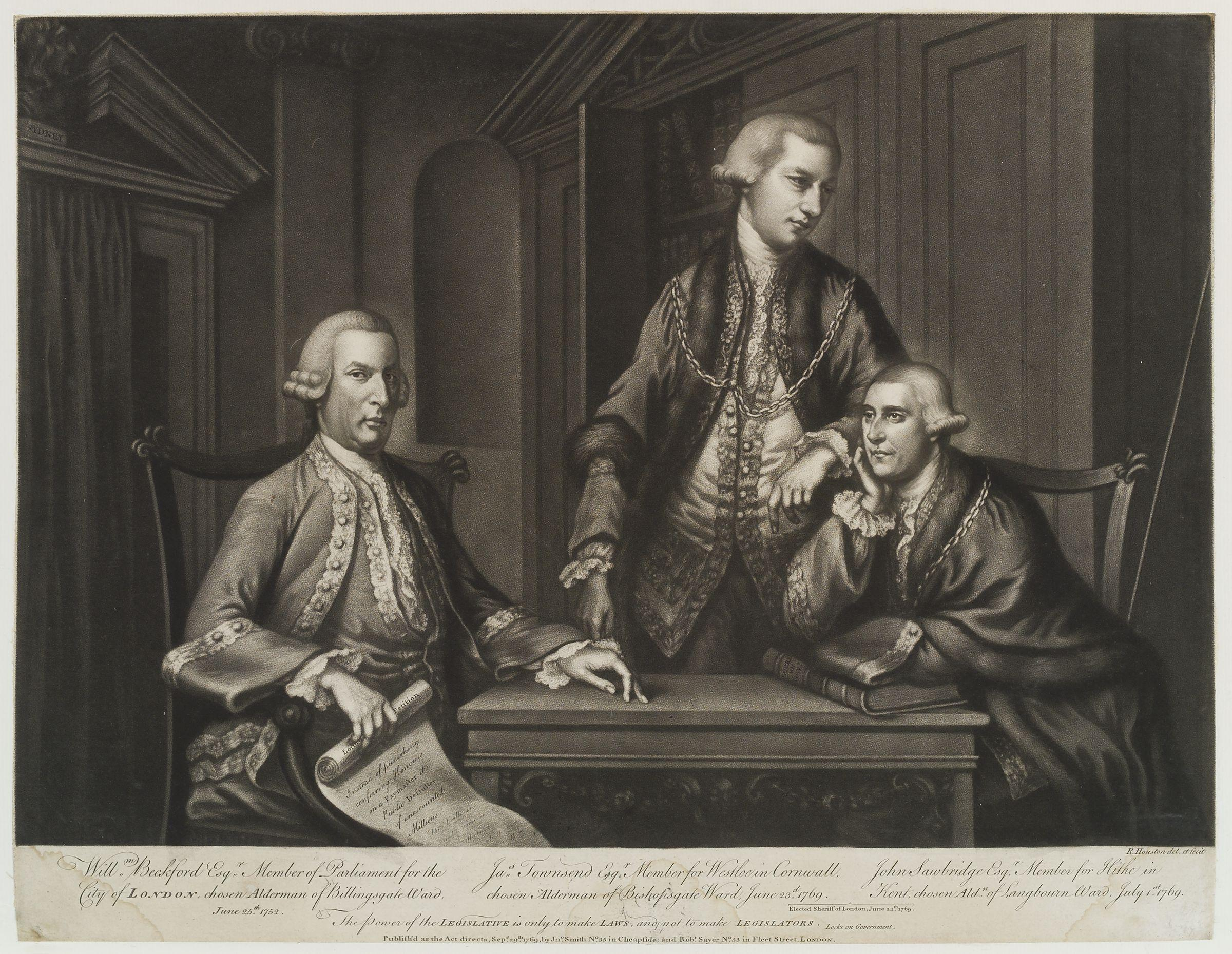
James Townsend (centre) in 1769 as alderman of the City of London.

James Townsend (1737 – 1 July 1787) was a British Whig politician who served as the Lord Mayor of London in 1772. He was Britain's first member of parliament of partial Black African descent.

== Life and political career ==
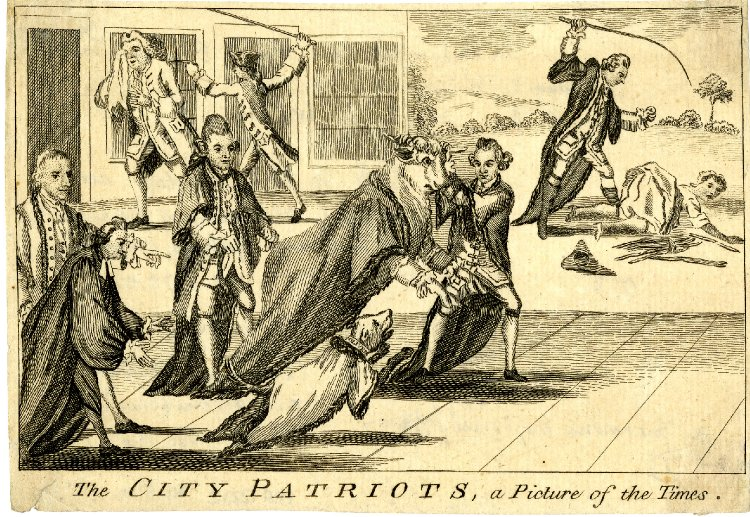
Satirical print from 1773 about the schism in the Wilkesite group. Townsend is upper right whipping the girl with sticks: a story to this effect had been publicised by Wilkes, though in reality it was two six-year-olds. The bull stands for Frederick Bull.

James Townsend was baptised on 8 February 1737 at the church of St. Christopher-le-Stocks in London. He was the son of London merchant (and later MP) Chauncy Townsend and his wife Bridget Phipps. He attended Hertford College, Oxford in 1756.

In politics James Townsend was closely linked from the 1760s with the Whig grandee William Petty, 2nd Earl of Shelburne. Supported by Shelburne, he entered Parliament as Member for West Looe at a by-election in 1767, holding the seat until 1774.

In 1769, Townsend was elected alderman of the City of London for Bishopsgate ward and Sheriff of the City of London, becoming one of the leaders of the Whigs in London. In 1771 Townsend followed John Horne Tooke in breaking away from the Society of Gentlemen Supporters of the Bill of Rights, which had been created to support John Wilkes after his expulsion from the House of Commons, and of which Townsend was a co-founder. He turned from a friend of Wilkes's to one of his fiercest opponents.

Townsend was elected Lord Mayor of London in 1772. Wilkes had come first in the polls but Sheriff Richard Oliver manipulated the voting process to prevent the election of Wilkes. This created political turmoil in the City and a mob incensed by Townsend's coup rioted outside Guildhall during the ball on Lord Mayor's Day. Townsend's arms were erased from the church of St Helen's Bishopsgate. John Wilkes was eventually elected Lord Mayor in 1774. In 1781, Townsend presented a petition for electoral reform from the Tiverton activist Martin Dunsford. Townsend ran unsuccessfully for Parliament for the City of London in the general election of 1780, and in April 1782, Shelburne arranged for Townsend's election to Parliament for the pocket borough of Calne. As a member he backed some calls for reform, but mainly supported William Pitt the Younger. Shortly before his death in office he had opposed the impeachment of Warren Hastings.

Townsend died at his estate, Bruce Castle in Tottenham, on 1 July 1787. He was buried nearby at Old Church Tottenham in the mausoleum of his wife's family, the Coleraines. Her inheritance had made him a wealthy man.

== Family ==
Townsend's mother Bridget (died 1762), who clandestinely married Chauncy Townsend in the Fleet Prison in 1730, was the daughter of James Phipps, who came from a prominent family of clothiers in Westbury, Wiltshire. At the age of sixteen, James Phipps entered the service of the Royal African Company (RAC) which traded slaves across the Atlantic between 1660 and 1752. Phipps lived on the Gold Coast for twenty years and died at Cape Coast Castle, the African headquarters of the RAC, in 1723. He became the highest-ranking RAC official in Africa before being removed from his post among accusations of embezzlement and abuse of power.

At Cape Coast James Phipps married Catherine, the daughter of an African woman and a European soldier in the service of the Dutch West India Company. In spite of being generously provided for in her husband's will, Catherine Phipps refused to move to England and died at Cape Coast in 1738. James and Catherine's children, including James Townsend's mother Bridget, were all of mixed race, so James Townsend, having one-eighth African ancestry, has been claimed as Britain's first black member of parliament and as the first black Lord Mayor of London. It does not appear that this aspect of Townsend's family history was known at the time.

Lord Coleraine's Estate Act 1763
- Act of Parliament
- Parliament of Great Britain
- Long title: An Act to enable His Majesty to grant certain Estates, devised by the Will of Henry late Lord Coleraine in the Kingdom of Ireland, deceased, to Trustees, in Trust, for Henrietta Rosa Peregrina Hare and her Heirs, subject to the Uses, Limitations, and Provisions, mentioned in the said Will; and to Two Annuities, payable to Rose Duplessis; and also to certain Sums, payable to Robert Knight, and to Henry Knight, and Anne the Wife of William Basset; and for other Purposes in the said Act mentioned.
- Citation: 3 Geo. 3. c. 45 Pr.
- Territorial extent: Great Britain

Dates
- Royal assent: 19 April 1763
- Commencement: 25 November 1762 (Note: Start of session.)

Status: Current legislation

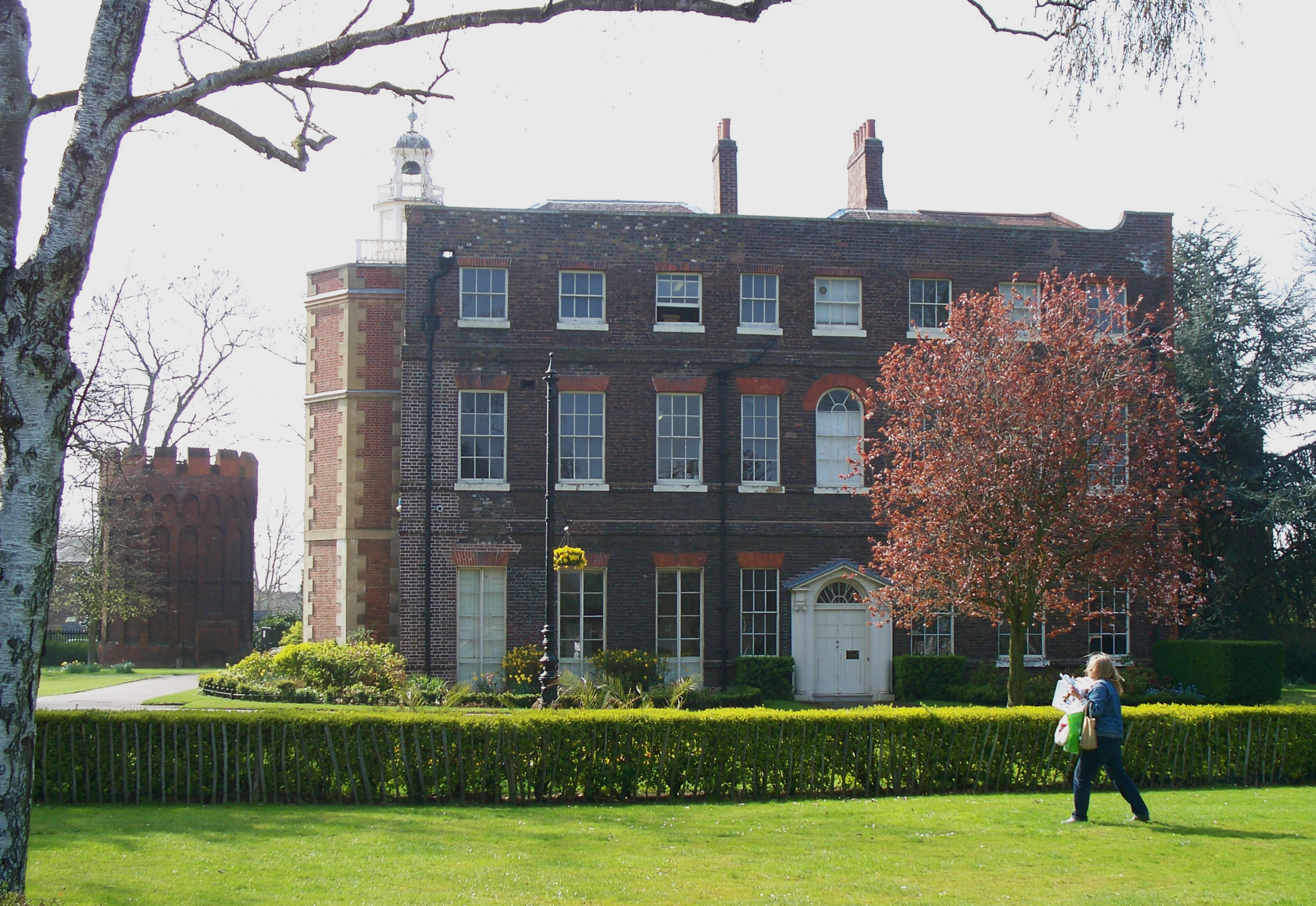
Bruce Castle, Tottenham, James Townsend's estate. He redesigned the east façade, depicted here.

In 1763 James Townsend married Henrietta Rosa Peregrina du Plessis (1745–1785), the illegitimate daughter of Henry Hare, 3rd Baron Coleraine, and Rose du Plessis. Henrietta Rosa was her father's heiress, but the estate escheated to the Crown because she was an alien. By means of his father's influence with Henry Fox, Townsend had the estate restored to him by a private act of Parliament, Lord Coleraine's Estate Act 1763 (3 Geo. 3. c. 45 Pr.). Bruce Castle, Townsend's house in Tottenham, was part of his wife's inheritance, and he redesigned parts of the building.

They had one son, Henry Hare, and one daughter, Henrietta Jemima. Henry Hare Townsend (1766–1827) married Charlotte Winter Lake, daughter of Sir James Lake, Bart. and sister of Admiral Sir Willoughby Lake. Their son was the poet and writer Chauncy Hare Townshend (who spelt his surname thus) to whom Dickens dedicated Great Expectations. Henrietta Jemima Townsend (1764–1848) married Nicholas Owen Smythe Owen (1769–1804) of Condover Hall, Shropshire. They had no issue.

James Townsend's brother was the physician, scientist, and economist Joseph Townsend, who made important contributions to population studies and geology.
