= Edward Alston =

Sir Edward Alston (1595 – 24 December 1669), was the president of the College of Physicians who married Sussana Hussey the widow of Jasper Hussey. Hussey had been a London fishmonger and he had left significant and valuable property in Billingsgate. Alston's daughter Sarah (later fourth duchess of Somerset Seymour) was a significant benefactor.

== Life ==
Alston was born in Suffolk, son of Edward Alston of Edwardstone, and was educated at St. John's College, Cambridge. He graduated B.A. 1615, M.D. 1626. In 1631 he was elected a fellow of the College of Physicians, and was president from 1655 until 1666. At the Restoration he was knighted by Charles II (3 September 1660). He increased the power of the college by a judicious inclusion of physicians who during the English Civil War had practised without the college license. Thus seventy honorary fellows were created at once. Their diploma fees filled the almost empty college chest, but while the college was unguarded during the plague, thieves carried off the money.

In the following year The Great Fire of London inflicted a still more serious loss on the society, Alston promised money to rebuild the college, but a quarrel arose as to the site, and at the annual election he was not again chosen president. He withdrew his promise of money and never renewed it.

Alston married Sussana Hussey, the widow of Jasper Hussey. Hussey had been a London fishmonger and he had left significant and valuable property in Billingsgate. He published in quarto ‘A Collection of Grants to the College of Physicians,’ London, 1660. He lived in Great St. Helens, Bishopsgate, and died very rich 24 December 1669.

One of their two daughters Sarah (later fourth duchess of Somerset Seymour) was a significant benefactor thanks to a clever Prenuptial agreement.
