= Catherine Phipps =

English slave trader (c. 1690–1738)

Catherine Phipps (c. 1690 – 11 March 1738) was a business woman in the Gold Coast. She was a prominent figure in the English Royal African Company (RAC) and the wife of James Phipps, who served as the governor of Cape Coast Castle and captain-general of the RAC in West Africa during the 18th century. Catherine Phipps was born in Moree on the Gold Coast, now known as Ghana, to a Dutch soldier and an African woman. Her life was marked by her involvement in the slave trade and her familial connections to notable individuals in English society.

== Early life and education ==
Phipps was born around 1690. James Phipps's last will referred to Catherine as having been born in "Morea" (most likely Moree), which was then a Dutch trading post but being from Axim in the Gold Coast. She was the daughter of a Dutch soldier and an African woman.

== Career ==
Phipps's husband, James Phipps, rose through the ranks of the Royal African Company (RAC) and became the governor of Cape Coast Castle, a major British trading fort on the Gold Coast, and captain-general of the RAC, the highest-ranking position in the company's operations in West Africa. James Phipps served in these roles for 20 years before dying on the coast in 1723.

After her husband's death, Catherine Phipps inherited a share of his estate, which was worth at least £3 million in today's pounds. What is noteworthy about James' will is that James specifically identified Catherine, an African woman, by name, and acknowledged her as his wife, which was a rare occurrence during the time period. Furthermore, James directed that she receive a portion of his estate, worth a minimum of £3 million in present-day currency. Additionally, James expressed his desire for Catherine and their children to relocate to England. This act of inclusion for a non-European wife in a will was an exceptional circumstance during that era. She was referred to as "Mrs. Phipps" in RAC correspondence and was known to be a prominent businesswoman and slave-owner in Cape Coast.

== Personal life ==
Phipps married James Phipps, an Englishman from Westbury in Wiltshire, c. 1705. Together, they had four daughters and one son: Bridget, Susanna, Henrietta, and a son whose name is not mentioned in available records. Bridget Phipps would go on to marry Chauncy Townsend, who became a member of Parliament (MP) in England and was the mother of James Townsend, who later served as MP and Lord Mayor of London, and Joseph Townsend, who became a medical doctor, geologist, vicar, and economist.

Her three daughters were sent to England, which was unusual for girls at the time, but she refused to follow them and remained in Cape Coast. This resulted in her children growing up far away from her and marrying into English society. Phipps died on 11 March 1738 in Cape Coast.
