= Thomas Phipps =

English merchant and Member of Parliament (c. 1648–1715)

Member of the House of Commons of the United Kingdom for Wilton
- In office January 1701 – November 1701

Member of the House of Commons of the United Kingdom for Westbury
- In office July 1702 – 1 December 1702

Personal details
- Born: c. 1648
- Died: 1715 (aged about 67)
- Spouse: Bridget (m. 1674)
- Children: At least 5 including: James Phipps; William Phipps; Thomas Phipps
- Parents: Thomas Phipps (father); Eleanor (mother)

Thomas Phipps (c. 1648 – 1715) was an English merchant who became briefly a Member of Parliament for, first, Wilton and, secondly, Westbury.

== Origins and career ==
Thomas Phipps was the second son of Thomas Phipps of Westbury Leigh, Wiltshire, whose family had emerged as prominent clothiers in the 16th century; and his wife Eleanor, daughter of James Hayes of Beckington, Somerset. Phipps himself sought his fortune in London, becoming involved in trading to the East Indies, West Africa and New England.

He bought property in west Wiltshire, namely Dilton manor, near Westbury, in 1693 and the nearby Heywood House around 1700.

== Political career ==
Phipps was elected to Parliament in January 1701 as the member for Wilton, but did not contest the seat at the general election in November 1701. In July 1702, he was elected as member for Westbury, but was swiftly unseated on petition. Thereafter, he played little active role in politics, though he gave evidence to the House of Commons in 1712 in defence of the Royal African Company.

== Personal life ==
In 1674, Phipps married Bridget, daughter of Peter Short, a merchant tailor of All-Hallows-in-the-Wall, London. Among their children, James Phipps was Captain-General of the Royal African Company at Cape Coast Castle between 1719 and 1722, while William Phipps was Governor of Bombay between 1722 and 1729.

== Death ==
Towards the end of his life, Phipps suffered financial difficulties. He died in 1715, and his son (also Thomas) inherited the Heywood estate with a mortgage of some £6,000. Bridget died in 1724.
