= Henry Hare, 3rd Baron Coleraine =

English antiquary, peer and politician

The Right Honourable The Lord Coleraine
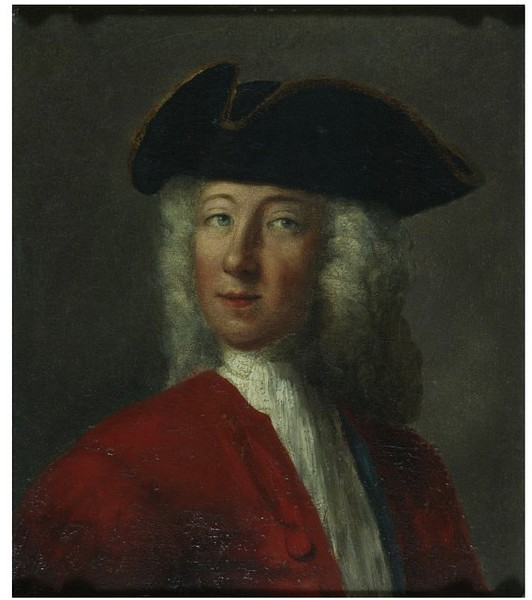
- Born: 10 May 1693; Betchworth, Surrey
- Died: 1 August 1749 (aged 56); Tottenham, London
- Education: Corpus Christi College, Oxford
- Known for: Fellow of the Royal Society; Fellow of the Society Antiquaries
- Father: Hugh Hare

Henry Hare, 3rd Baron Coleraine, FRS, FSA (10 May 1693 – 1 August 1749) was an English antiquary, peer and politician who sat in the British House of Commons from 1730 to 1734, representing the constituency of Boston.

== Life ==
Born in Betchworth, Surrey, 10 May 1693, he was the eldest son of the Hon. Hugh Hare, by his wife Lydia, daughter of Matthew Carlton of Edmonton, Middlesex. He was educated at Enfield under Robert Uvedale. On the death of his grandfather, Henry Hare, 2nd Baron Coleraine, in 1708, he succeeded to the title as Baron Coleraine. He matriculated at Corpus Christi College, Oxford on 2 February 1712, aged 17. He was under the tuition of John Rogers, who in 1716 married his sister Lydia.

Coleraine visited Italy three times; the second time, about 1723, in company with Conyers Middleton, when he made a collection of prints and drawings of the antiquities, buildings, and pictures in Italy, given after his death to Corpus Christi College. He was a member of the Republica Letteraria di Arcadia, and a friend of the Marquis Scipio Maffei, who renewed their friendship at Coleraine's country seat, Bruce Castle, Tottenham.

Coleraine was elected Fellow of the Society of Antiquaries, 8 December 1725, and frequently acted as vice-president. On 18 May 1727 he became a member of the Gentleman's Society at Spalding, Lincolnshire, and was also a member of the Brasenose Society. In the following year he was Grand Master of Freemasons. He was chosen Fellow of the Royal Society on 8 January 1730.

Coleraine was elected as a Tory Member of Parliament for Boston, Lincolnshire, in a contested by-election on 22 January 1730. He voted against the Administration on the army in 1732 and on the Excise Bill in 1733. He spoke against the Address on 17 January 1734, and in March against authorizing the King to increase his forces if an emergency occurred during the parliamentary recess. He did not stand at the 1734 general election.

Coleraine was a patron of George Vertue, and took him antiquarian tours in England to make drawing. He died in August 1749, and was buried at Tottenham.

== Works ==
A copy of Latin alcaics from his pen was printed in the Academiæ Oxoniensis Comitia Philologica in honorem Annæ Pacificæ, 1713, and in the Musæ Anglicanæ, iii. 303, under the title of Musarum Oblatio. Basil Kennett, who in 1714 succeeded Thomas Turner in the presidency of Corpus, inscribed to Coleraine an epistolary poem on his predecessor's death.

== Legacy ==
Coleraine bequeathed, with certain reservations; his drawings and prints of antiquities and buildings in Great Britain to the Society of Antiquaries; but the codicil being declared void, and the society not caring for a chancery suit for their recovery, Rose Duplessis (see below), at the persuasion of Coleraine's friend Henry Baker, presented them to the society, and afterwards a portrait of Coleraine when young by Richardson, with other minor bequests.

His library was purchased in 1754 by Thomas Osborne, the bookseller, who took many private papers and deeds lodged in presses behind the bookcases. Among them was the second Lord Coleraine's manuscript history of Tottenham. The pictures and antiques were sold by auction on 13 and 14 March 1754.

== Family ==
Coleraine married, 20 January 1718, Anne, eldest daughter of John Hanger, Governor of the Bank of England 1719–1721, grandson of Sir Lewis Roberts, who brought him a dowry of nearly £100,000. The couple lived together until October 1720, when Lady Coleraine left her husband; there were no children.

Coleraine, finding a reconciliation impossible, formed on 29 April 1740 a "solemn engagement" with Rose Duplessis (1710–1790), daughter of François Duplessis, a French clergyman, by whom he had a daughter, Henrietta Rosa Peregrina, born at Crema, Lombardy in Italy 12 September 1745. Having had no issue by his wife, Coleraine bequeathed his Tottenham estates to this illegitimate daughter; but she being an alien they escheated to the crown. A grant of them was later obtained via a private act of Parliament, Lord Coleraine's Estate Act 1763 (3 Geo. 3. c. 45 Pr.), for James Townsend, whom she married on 2 May 1763.

Lady Coleraine survived until 10 January 1754, and asked to be buried at Bray, Berkshire. Gabriel, third son of her uncle Sir George Hanger, was, in 1762, created Baron Coleraine.

Parliament of Great Britain
Preceded by Henry Pacey; Richard Ellys	Member of Parliament for Boston; 1730–1734; With: Richard Ellys	Succeeded by Albemarle Bertie; Richard Fydell
Peerage of Great Britain
Preceded by Henry Hare	Baron Coleraine; 1708–1749	Extinct
