= James Phipps of Cape Coast Castle =

English slave trader (c.1687–1723)

James Phipps (c.1687 – 15 January 1723) was at the heart of the Atlantic slave trade in the early 18th century, being Captain-General of the Royal African Company and Governor of Cape Coast Castle on the Gold Coast.

== Origins ==
Phipps was one of at least five sons of the English merchant Thomas Phipps and his wife Bridget Short. The Phipps family had emerged in the 16th century as prominent clothiers in Westbury, Wiltshire, where Thomas Phipps acquired an estate after a successful career in London, trading to the East Indies, West Africa, and New England.

== Career ==
Phipps began his career with the Royal African Company in 1703. He served as a writer (a junior employee) at Cape Coast Castle, as agent at James Fort in Accra, and as Chief Agent and Warehouse-Keeper at Cape Coast Castle, before being appointed as the company's Captain-General (with both civil and military authority) on 23 July 1719. He was summarily dismissed after three years in post, for reasons that remain opaque, and died at Cape Coast Castle while awaiting a ship in which to return to England. Despite the long period of time that he spent in the company's service and the high rank that he attained, he never succeeded in making a substantial fortune, a failure that he himself attributed to his personal honesty. The value of his estate on his death was estimated at only £3,200. The longevity of Phipps's career was remarkable, given that the company's records for the period between 1684 and 1732 reveal an average annual death toll for men in the company's service on the Gold Coast of 27 percent.

== Family ==
Phipps had a lasting relationship with the mulatto daughter of a Dutch soldier, Catherine Phipps, for whom he provided in his will, and by whom he had four daughters and a son. His grandson by his daughter Bridget, James Townsend, became a Member of Parliament and Lord Mayor of London.
