= Gary Lefley =

British activist

Gary Lefley (born 1954) was the general secretary for the Campaign for Nuclear Disarmament (CND) from 1990 to 1994.

Born in Tottenham, he was educated at Tottenham Grammar School and the University of East Anglia where he joined the CPGB and met his first wife Anne. Years later, they moved to Yorkshire where he became the Secretary of the CPGB in Barnsley. Lefley belonged to the Straight Left faction within the Communist Party of Great Britain. Lefley remained general secretary of CND until 1994, when the post was abolished and the anti-nuclear movement was declining; towards the end of the Cold War. He remains a politician and Union activist and is currently the headteacher of a Pupil referral Unit in London.
