= Hugh Hare (MP for Bletchingley) =

English translator and politician

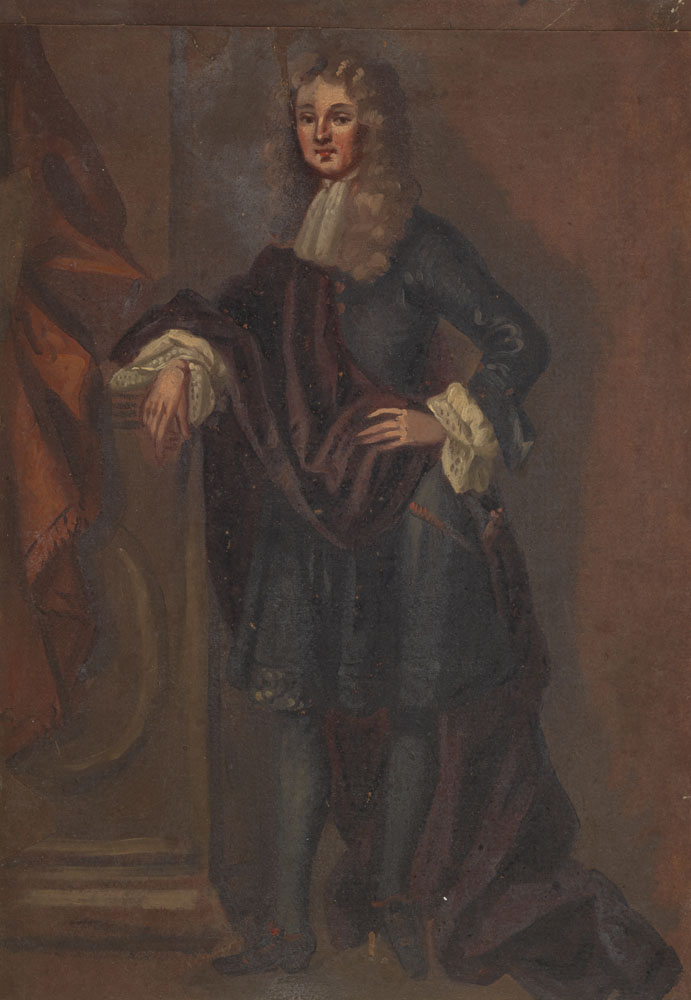
Hare, portrait after Godfrey Kneller

The Honourable Hugh Hare (1668–1707) was an English translator and politician.

== Life ==
He was baptised at Totteridge, Hertfordshire, 2 July 1668, the eldest surviving son of Henry Hare, 2nd Baron Coleraine, by his first wife, Constantia, daughter of Sir Richard Lucy, of Broxbourne, Hertfordshire. He lived at East Betchworth, Surrey.

Hare, a Whig, was elected as Member of Parliament for Bletchingley in 1698, with Sir Robert Clayton. He was buried at Tottenham, 1 March 1707.

== Works ==
Appointed chairman of the general quarter sessions for Surrey, held at Dorking, 5 April 1692, he delivered a "religious, learned, and loyal" charge, which he published by request (London, 1692; 2nd edit. 1696). From the Italian of Agostino Mascardi he translated An Historical Relation of the Conspiracy of John Lewis Count de Fieschi, against the City and Republick of Genoua in the year 1547, London, 1693. He was also one of several who helped in the translation of the Works of Lucian, 4 vols. London, 1711–10, to which is prefixed a Life by John Dryden.

== Family ==
By his wife Lydia, daughter of Matthew Carlton of Edmonton, Middlesex, who died before him and was also buried at Tottenham, he had a son Henry Hare, 3rd Baron Coleraine, and other issue.
