= Hugh Hare, 1st Baron Coleraine =

English courtier

Hugh Hare, 1st Baron Coleraine (1606 – 19 October 1667), was an English courtier.

== Life ==
Hare was the son of John Hare and Margaret Crowch, the daughter of John Crowch of Cornbury in Buntingford, Hertfordshire. John Hare was a Member of Parliament (MP) in the 1620s.

Hare had inherited a large amount of money from his great-uncle Sir Nicholas Hare, Master of the Rolls. On the death of his father, his mother had remarried Henry Montagu, 1st Earl of Manchester, allowing the young Hare to rise rapidly in Court and social circles. He married Montagu's daughter by his first marriage and purchased the manor of Tottenham, including the Lordship House, in 1625, and was raised to the Irish peerage as Baron Coleraine shortly thereafter.

As he was closely associated with the court of Charles I, Hare's fortunes went into decline during the English Civil War. His castle at Longford and his house in Totteridge were seized by Parliamentary forces, and returned upon the Restoration in a severe state of disrepair. Records of Tottenham from the period are now lost, and the ownership and condition of the Lordship House during the Commonwealth of England are unknown.

== Marriage and Issue ==
Hare married, in 1632, Lucy, second daughter of his stepfather, Henry Montagu, 1st Earl of Manchester. They had, among other children, Henry, the next baron, and Hugh, who inherited the estate at Docking in Norfolk.

Hare's widow was buried on 9 February 1682 at Totteridge.

== Death ==
Hare died at his home in Totteridge on 2 Oct 1667, having choked to death on a bone eating turkey whilst laughing and drinking. He was buried at Totteridge on 9 Oct 1667.

== Bibliography ==
- Cockayne, G. E. (2000) [1913]. The Complete Peerage. Vol. III (Microprint ed.). Stroud, UK: Sutton Publishing. ISBN 0-904387-82-8.
- Pegram, Jean (1987), From Manor House... to Museum, Haringey History Bulletin, vol. 28, London: Hornsey Historical Society, ISBN 0-903481-05-7
- Wright, Stephen (September 2004). "Hare, Hugh, first Baron Coleraine". Oxford Dictionary of National Biography (online ed.). Oxford University Press. doi:10.1093/ref:odnb/12301. (Subscription, Wikipedia Library access or UK public library membership required.)

=== Attribution ===
- This article incorporates text from a publication now in the public domain: Goodwin, Gordon (1890). "Hare, Hugh (1606?-1667)". In Stephen, Leslie; Lee, Sidney (eds.). Dictionary of National Biography. Vol. 24. London: Smith, Elder & Co. pp. 368–369.

Peerage of Ireland
New creation	Baron Coleraine; 1625–1667	Succeeded by Henry Hare
