= Henry Hare, 2nd Baron Coleraine =

English politician and antiquary

The Right Honourable The Lord Coleraine
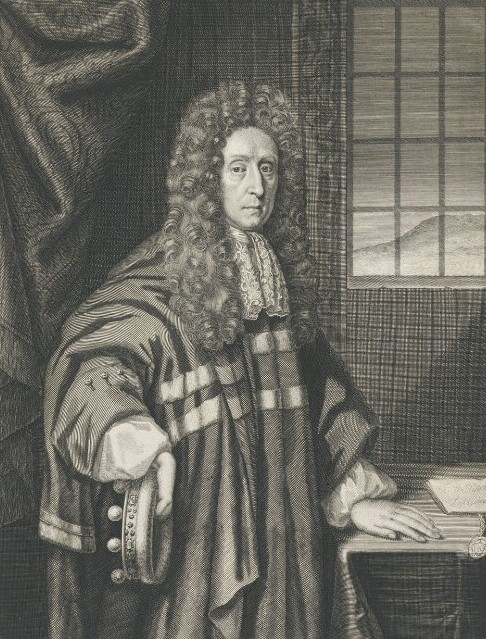
- Born: 21 April 1636; Totteridge, Hertfordshire
- Died: 15 July 1708 (aged 72); Tottenham, London
- Occupations: Politician, antiquary

Henry Hare, 2nd Baron Coleraine (21 April 1636 – 15 July 1708) was an English politician and antiquary.

== Life ==
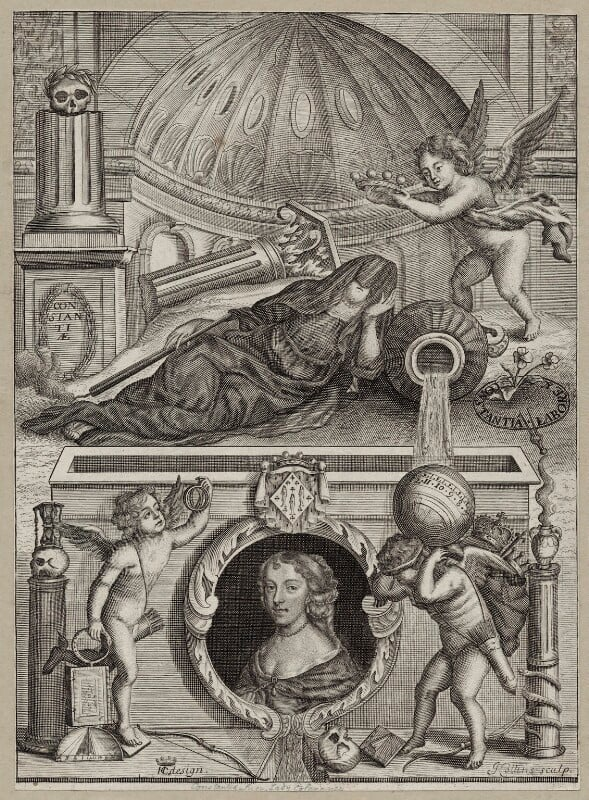
Memorial engraving to Constantia Hare by John Collins

Baptised at Totteridge, Hertfordshire, 21 April 1636, he was the eldest surviving son of Hugh Hare, 1st Baron Coleraine, by his wife Lucy, second daughter of the first marriage of Henry Montagu, 1st Earl of Manchester. He resided at Tottenham, Middlesex.

Longford Castle in Wiltshire was a family property, and Coleraine was elected Member of Parliament for Old Sarum in 1679. He was unsuccessful as a candidate for Wiltshire in 1690.

In 1696, Coleraine built a vestry at the east end of the north aisle of Tottenham parish church, and underneath a vault for his family. He was buried at Tottenham on 15 July 1708.

== Works ==
Coleraine corresponded with Dr. John Woodward on antiquarian subjects, and was tutored in numismatics by Walter Charleton. He left in manuscript an account of Tottenham, which treats mainly the parochial charities. Richard Rawlinson purchased it from Thomas Osborne, the bookseller, and showed it to the Society of Antiquaries of London in 1755. It went to the Bodleian Library. Richard Gough had a transcript taken, for the appendix to Henry George Oldfield and Richard Randall Dyson's History and Antiquities of the Parish of Tottenham High-Cross (1790), where its authorship is attributed to Henry Hare, 3rd Baron Coleraine.

== Family ==
Coleraine was married three times:

- First to Constantia (died 1680), daughter of Sir Richard Lucy of Broxbourne, Hertfordshire, by whom he had Hugh Hare, and other children;
- Secondly to Sarah, Dowager Duchess of Somerset, widow of John Seymour, 4th Duke of Somerset (died 1692). Sarah remained a Duchess irrespective of her marriage due to a pre-nuptial agreement. She was very wealthy before she became a Duchess. and
- Thirdly, in 1696, to Elizabeth Portman (died 1732), widow of Robert Reade of Cheshunt, Hertfordshire.

Peerage of Ireland
Preceded by Hugh Hare	Baron Coleraine; 1667–1708	Succeeded by Henry Hare
