= The John of Gaunt School =

- The John of Gaunt School's falcon logo

Location
- Wingfield Road; Trowbridge, Wiltshire, BA14 9EH; England
- Coordinates: 51°18′56″N 02°13′10″W

Information
- Type: Academy
- Department for Education URN: 138020 Tables
- Ofsted: Reports
- Headteacher: Ben Rhodes
- Gender: Mixed
- Age: 11 to 18
- Enrolment: 1,262
- Houses: Kirin, Centaur, Wyvern, Phoenix
- Colours: Red, Blue, Green, Yellow
- Website: johnofgauntschool.org

The John of Gaunt School is a mixed secondary school with a sixth form and a Resource Base for Communication and Interaction Needs, in Trowbridge, Wiltshire, England. The school is named after John of Gaunt, 1st Duke of Lancaster, as it is built upon land that he once owned.

The school's immediate predecessors were the Trowbridge High School for Boys and the Trowbridge High School for Girls, single-sex grammar schools which were established in 1912 on two sites: on Wingfield Road (boys) and nearby on Gloucester Road (girls). These formed a co-educational grammar school, the Combined High Schools, on 14 April 1969.

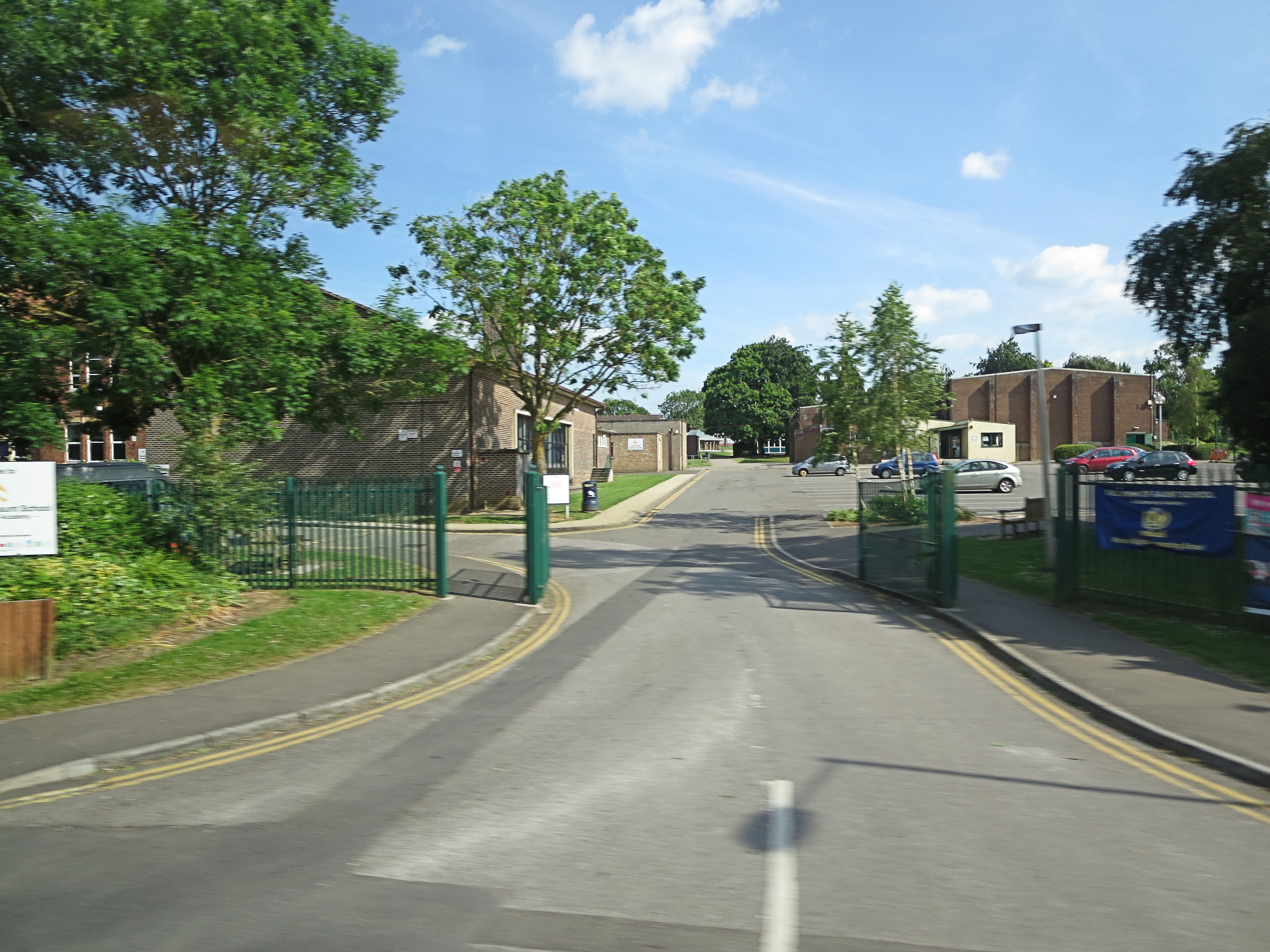
The school entrance on Wingfield Road

In August 1974, the school became a coeducational comprehensive school and was renamed The John of Gaunt School. Previously a community school administered by Wiltshire Council, the school converted to academy status on 1 April 2012. However, the school continues to coordinate with Wiltshire Council for admissions.

The John of Gaunt School offers GCSEs and BTECs as programmes of study for pupils, as well as vocational courses offered in conjunction with Wiltshire College. Students in the sixth form have the option to study for a range of A-levels and further BTECs.

The school joined the Equa multi-academy trust in April 2023. The trust also operates Lavington School, as well as a number of Wiltshire primary schools.

== Notable former pupils ==
Trowbridge High School for Boys

- John Atyeo (1932–1993), prolific goal-scorer for Bristol City who also scored for England
- Sir William Richard Joseph Cook (1905–1987), mathematician who helped to lead the British hydrogen bomb programme in the 1950s
- John Garrett (1902–1966), headmaster and author
- Kenneth Harris (1919–2005), former chief interviewer for The Observer newspaper
- Tony Lane (1928–2011), nuclear physicist
- John Henry Pyle Pafford (1900–1996), librarian and editor
- James Rodway (1848–1926), botanist and historian of Guyana

Trowbridge High School for Girls

- Janet Anderson (1949–2023), briefly at the school, Labour MP for Rossendale and Darwen
- Maureen Duffy (born 1933), author
- Joan M. Hussey (1907–2006), Professor of History at the University of London
- Bel Mooney (born 1946), journalist and broadcaster
- Marjorie Reeves (1905–2003), historian

Trowbridge High School

- Alan Smith (born 1957), former Bishop of St Albans and Member of the House of Lords
- Deborah Meaden (born 1959), businesswoman and Dragons' Den member

The John of Gaunt School

- Nick Blackwell (born 1990), boxer
- Rob Chapman (born 1975), musician and guitar company owner
- Keri Davies, radio producer and playwright
- Jordan Daykin (born 1995), entrepreneur
- Tom Gale (born 1998), Olympic high jumper
- Gemma Hunt (born 1982), CBBC and CBeebies presenter
- Chris Stokes (born 1991), footballer
- Becky Baldwin, bass player for Mercyful Fate

== Headteachers ==
Trowbridge and District County Secondary School

- Mr J.W. Henson (1897–1912)

Trowbridge Secondary School for Boys

- Mr J.W. Henson (1912–1914)

Trowbridge Secondary School for Girls

- Miss E.M. Moore (1912–1914)

Trowbridge High School for Boys

- Mr J.W. Henson (1914–1937)
- Mr L.G. Smith (1937–1947)
- Mr G.V.S. Bucknall (1947–1968)

Trowbridge High School for Girls

- Miss E.M. Moore (1912–1932)
- Miss J.I. Field (1932–1938)
- Miss K.M.S. Dawes (1939–1954)
- Miss B. Morris (1954–1969)

Trowbridge High School

- Mr G. Suggitt (1969–1974)

The John of Gaunt School

- Frank St. George (1974–1979)
- Keith Berry (1979–1991)
- Stephen Gee (1992–2001)
- Lyn Sharpe (2001–2003)
- Andy Packer (2004–2014)
- Mike Gunston (2014–2018)
- Paul Skipp (2018–2022)
- Matthew Woodville (2022–2023)
- Ben Rhodes (2023–)

== See also ==
- Lavington School – secondary school in Market Lavington, part of the Equa Multi-Academy Trust
- St Augustine's Catholic College – Catholic secondary school and sixth form in Trowbridge
- The Clarendon Academy – secondary school and sixth form in Trowbridge
