= RPHS =

RPHS can refer to:

- Ridge Point High School, Fort Bend County, Texas
- Risdon Park High School, Port Pirie, South Australia (closed 1994)
- Roselle Park High School, Union County, New Jersey
- Raynes Park High School, Raynes Park, England
- Ridgefield Park High School, Bergen County, New Jersey
- Registered Phlebology Sonographer
