= List of headmasters at Bristol Grammar School =

The following is a list of headmasters at Bristol Grammar School from when the school began in 1532.

Start year	End year	Name	Academic degree	Alma mater
1532 (or earlier)	c. 1542	Thomas Moffat		
1542	c. 1561	John Harris		
c. 1561	1562	Mr Dyconson		
c. 1564	1564	Mr Style		
c. 1565	1566	Mr Turner		
c. 1570	1571	Mr Dunne		
c. 1582	1583	Mr White		
c. 1584	1584	Mr Alexander Woodsonne		
c. 1600	1622	William Swift	M.A.	Christ Church, Oxford
1622	1622	Richard Payne	M.A.	New College, Oxford
1622	1636	Richard Cheynie	M.A.	Magdalen College, Oxford
1636	1638	Henry James	M.A.	Trinity College, Oxford
1638	1642	Bartholmew Man	M.A.	Corpus Christi College, Oxford
1642	1657	Walter Rainsthorp	M.A.	St John's College, Oxford
1657	1662	John Stephens	M.A. B.C.L.	Trinity College, Oxford
1662	1670	William Ball	M.A.	Wadham College, Oxford
1670	1687	John Rainsthorp	M.A.	St John's College, Oxford
1687	1689	William Stephens	M.A.	St Edmund Hall, Oxford
1689	1697	Thomas Wotton	M.A.	Wadham College, Oxford; King's College, Cambridge
1697	1702	Robert Welstead	M.A.	
1702	1709	Edward Pearce	M.A.	University College, Oxford
1709	1717	William Goldwin	M.A.	King's College, Cambridge
1717	1722	James Taylor	M.A.	Oriel College, Oxford
1722	1743	Alexander Stopford Catcott	M.A.	St John's College, Oxford
1743	1764	Samuel Seyer	M.A.	Pembroke College, Oxford
1764	1811	Charles Lee	M.A.	Pembroke College, Oxford
1812	1844	John Joseph Goodenough	M.A.	New College, Oxford
1827	1854	Robert Evans	M.A. D.C.L.	Jesus College, Oxford
1855	1860	Charles Thomas Hudson	M.A.	St John's College, Cambridge
1860	1883	John William Caldicott	M.A. D.D.	Pembroke College, Oxford; Jesus College, Oxford
1883	1906	Robert Leighton	M.A.	Balliol College, Oxford
1906	1916	Sir Cyril Norwood	M.A. D.Litt.	St John's College, Oxford
1917	1938	Joseph Edwin Barton	M.A.	Pembroke College, Oxford
1938	1942	Ralph Westwood Moore	M.A.	Christ Church, Oxford
1943	1960	John Garrett	M.A.	Exeter College, Oxford
1960	1975	John Mackay	D.Phil.	Merton College, Oxford
1975	1988	Roy Avery	M.A.	Magdalen College, Oxford
1988	1999	Charles Martin	M.A.	Selwyn College, Cambridge
1999	2008	David Mascord	B.A. PhD	University of York; St John's College, Cambridge
2008	2018	Roderick MacKinnon	BSc	University of Leicester
2018		Jaideep Barot	M.A. M.Sc.	St John's College, Cambridge; University of Durham
