= West Lavington, Wiltshire =

Village in Wiltshire, England

Coordinates: 51.279°N 1.995°W

West Lavington
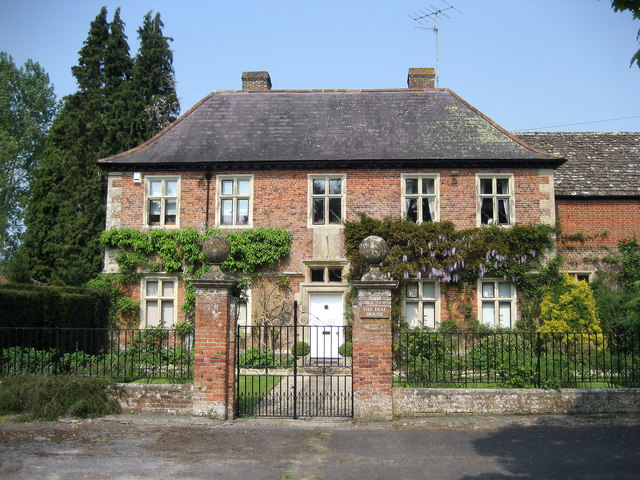
- Dial House, West Lavington

- Location within Wiltshire
- Population: 1,502 (in 2011)
- OS grid reference: SU007530
- Unitary authority: Wiltshire
- Ceremonial county: Wiltshire
- Region: South West
- Country: England
- Sovereign state: United Kingdom
- Post town: DEVIZES
- Postcode district: SN10
- Dialling code: 01380
- Police: Wiltshire
- Fire: Dorset and Wiltshire
- Ambulance: South Western
- UK Parliament: Melksham and Devizes
- Website: Parish Council

West Lavington is a village and civil parish in Wiltshire, England, on the north edge of Salisbury Plain, on the A360 road between Devizes and Salisbury, about 5 miles (8 km) south of Devizes. The parish includes the hamlet of Littleton Panell.

The parish was formerly known as Bishops' Lavington, the land having been granted to Roger, Bishop of Salisbury in 1136, and remaining in the hands of the bishopric throughout the Middle Ages.

== History ==
Domesday Book has two entries for Laventone, in the area of the present Market Lavington and West Lavington; these had a combined population of 38 households. A further 25 households were recorded at Liteltone, corresponding to Littleton Pannell.

Although Domesday does not mention a church or priest, tithes from West Lavington church (together with that at Potterne) are mentioned in 1091, and later endowed a prebendary at Salisbury Cathedral. From 1136, Bishops of Salisbury held land at West Lavington, sometimes considered to be part of their holding at Potterne. The Dauntsey family held some land from at least 1474, and Sir John Dauntsey was the tenant of the bishop's manor at the time of his death in 1630; the tenancy then passed by marriage to Sir John Danvers. Two further marriages brought the tenancy to James Bertie, later 1st Earl of Abingdon; his descendants sold it c.1766 to the Duke of Marlborough.

Littleton Pannell manor passed through many hands, including the 1st Earl of Abingdon in 1688 and William, Earl of Radnor in 1771. By 1903, the principal landowner in the area was Charles Awdry, a partner in W. H. Smith & Son, and the father of Robert Awdry who was chairman of Wiltshire County Council in the 1940s.

Detached parts of the parish were rationalised in 1884: Fiddington, a long narrow tithing separating Market Lavington from Easterton, was transferred from West Lavington to Market Lavington; and the tithing of Gore, south of West Lavington, was transferred in the opposite direction.

Land in the south of the parish, to the south of Gore Cross, was bought by the War Department in stages from 1910, and today forms part of the military Salisbury Plain Training Area.

== Religious sites ==
=== Parish church ===
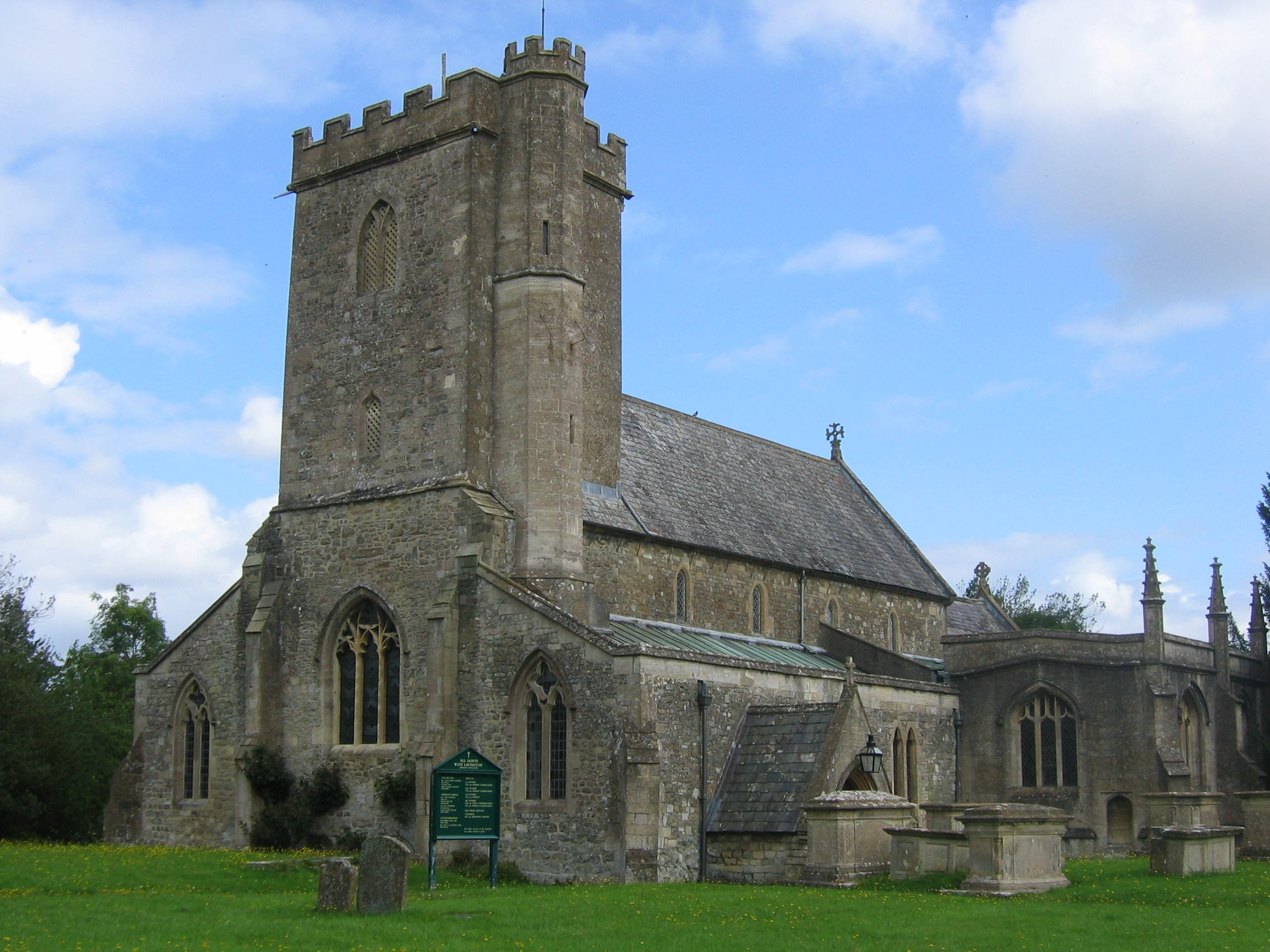
All Saints' church

The parish church of All Saints, which stands by the north–south road through the village, is described by Pevsner as "an interesting church with a somewhat complicated story". The nave of the present building dates from the 12th century or earlier, and in the 13th the nave was shortened, the tower rebuilt and the clerestory added; the upper part of the tower was rebuilt in the 14th, and north and south porches added in the same period. In the 15th century the south transept was replaced by the Dauntsey chapel, and the Beckett chapel was added to the south of the chancel in the next century.

The clock bell was cast in 1706 by Abraham Rudhall, and the peal of six was cast in 1810. Restoration in 1847 by T.H. Wyatt included a new oak roof for the nave and the rebuilding of both porches. The older parts of the church are in local greensand stone, while the restoration used limestone ashlar. The building was designated as Grade I listed in 1962. Many of the monuments in the churchyard, including chest tombs from the late 18th century, are Grade II listed. Engraved glass in the three-light east window was commissioned in 2001 from Simon Whistler (son of Laurence).

In 1874, Fiddington tithing was transferred from West Lavington to form part of the parish created for the new church at Easterton. West Lavington benefice was united with Little Cheverell in 1915; this union was undone in 1958 but remade in 1983. Today the parish is part of the benefice of the Lavingtons, Cheverells & Easterton.

=== Others ===
Ebenezer Baptist Church was built at Littleton Panell in 1848 and is affiliated to the Fellowship of Independent Evangelical Churches.

Also at Littleton Panell, a Wesleyan Methodist chapel was built in 1900. It closed in 1967, was bought by the Catholic Church, and reopened as St Joseph's in 1971.

== Amenities ==
The nearest state secondary school is Lavington School in Market Lavington. Dauntsey's School, an independent day and boarding school, is in the village. The school was founded in 1542 by William Dauntesey, a London merchant from a local family; it moved to its present site around 1898, when its main building was built in red brick to designs of C.E. Ponting.

A primary school, Dauntsey Academy Primary School, was built in 1999 at a new site to replace a 19th-century building on the High Street.

The village has a pub, the Churchill Arms. There is a village hall, a shop with a post office, and a doctor's surgery.

The Stert and Westbury Railway was built through the parish by the Great Western Railway Company in 1900, providing routes from London to Weymouth and Taunton. At the same time, Lavington Station was built north of Littleton Panell where the line crosses the A360; it was closed in 1967. No local railway stations remain; the nearest are Pewsey and Westbury.

== Littleton Panell ==
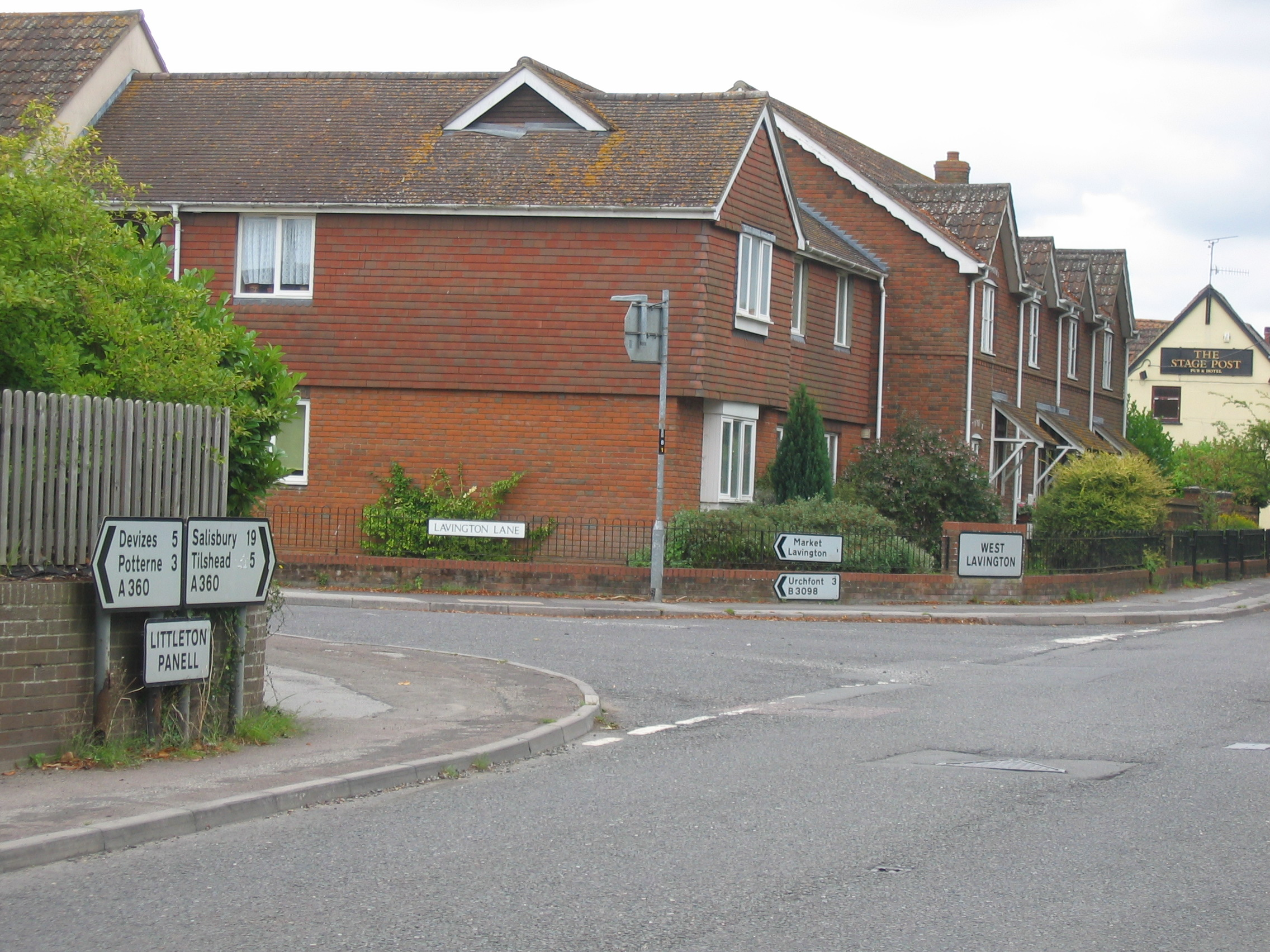
Lavington Lane leads to Market Lavington from West Lavington.

Littleton Panell is a contiguous hamlet in the parish of West Lavington. Its extent is disputed but its centre is north of the A360/B3098 crossroads and south of the old railway station for the Great Western Railway. The former manor house is now offices and its grounds were, for many years, a fruit farm. More recently, they were planted as a vineyard and an orchard.

== Notable people ==
William Talman, architect and pupil of Sir Christopher Wren, was born at West Lavington around 1650.

David Saunders, whose life inspired Hannah More's tract The Shepherd of Salisbury Plain, was born at Littleton Pannell in 1717 and buried in West Lavington churchyard in 1796.

Richard Godolphin Long was baptised at West Lavington in 1761. He became High Sheriff of Wiltshire and a Member of Parliament, and built Rood Ashton House near West Ashton.

Nigel Balchin (1908–1970) was an author and screenwriter. Son of the village baker, he was educated at Dauntsey's School and Cambridge University, and initially worked as an industrial psychologist. After a distinguished war record, he was thought (by John Betjeman, Elizabeth Bowen, L.P. Hartley and others) to be one of Britain's most promising novelists of the 1940s. He wrote The Small Back Room (later made into a film) and several other novels. His best-known film is The Man Who Never Was, for which he received a BAFTA in 1956.

Actor George Baker, best known for playing Inspector Wexford on television, lived in the village prior to his death in 2011.
