= William Dauntesey =

William Dauntesey or Dauntsey (died 1543) was a London merchant. He was Master of the Worshipful Company of Mercers, an alderman of the City of London, and was elected as Sheriff for 1531.

A merchant of the Staple at Calais, he was the youngest of four sons of John Dauntesey of West Lavington in Wiltshire. He married Agnes Tenacres in 1504; she was a step-daughter of William Lambert, a Master of the Worshipful Company of Mercers, to whom William had been apprenticed. They had no children and she died before he made his will in 1542. He was buried near Agnes in the parish church of St. Antholin (near Mercer's Hall, Cheapside, London).

He died in 1543. By a will dated 10 March 1542, Dauntesey gave land in London to the Mercers' Company so that they could build a schoolhouse for a grammar school at West Lavington, and support seven poor people in an almshouse. The school continues today as the private Dauntsey's School. Part of the bequest reads:

I William Dauntesey Citizen and Alderman of the Cities of London ... will that in West Lavington a house called a church house and a house for a schole be kept ... and that Ambrose Dauntesey shall name and appoint one apt and convenient person to teach gramer in the Schole house...

Charles Ponting, architect of the West Lavington school, researched the arms of William Dauntsey in 1895. He was informed by the College of Arms that they were Per pale or and gules two bars nebuly counter-changed.
