= Jonathon Lodwick =

English cricketer

Personal information
- Full name: Jonathon Andrew Lodwick
- Born: 14 October 1989 (age 37); Reading, Berkshire, England
- Batting: Right-handed
- Bowling: Right-arm medium

Domestic team information
- Years: Team
- 2010: Oxford University
- 2012: Cambridge University

Career statistics
Competition	First-class
Matches	2
Runs scored	32
Batting average	32.00
100s/50s	–/–
Top score	32
Balls bowled	389
Wickets	7
Bowling average	22.71
5 wickets in innings	–
10 wickets in match	–
Best bowling	4/55
Catches/stumpings	1/–
- Source: Cricinfo, 26 June 2020

Jonathon Andrew Lodwick (born 14 October 1989) is an English barrister and former first-class cricketer.

Lodwick was born at Reading in October 1989. He was educated at Dauntsey's School, before going up to Worcester College, Oxford. While studying at Oxford, he made a single appearance in first-class cricket for Oxford University against Cambridge University in The University Match at Oxford in 2010. From Oxford, Lodwick went on to St John's College at the University of Cambridge to complete his master's degree. While at Cambridge, Leighton played in the 2012 University Match for Cambridge. He took 7 wickets in the match and scored 32 runs.

Lodwick studied law at City, University of London after graduating from Cambridge and was called to the bar as a member of the Inner Temple in July 2016.
