= Derek Cooper (journalist) =

British journalist and broadcaster (1925–2014)

- Born: Derek Macdonald Cooper; 25 May 1925; London
- Died: 19 April 2014 (aged 88)
- Occupations: journalist, author, broadcaster
- Known for: food journalism, broadcasting

Derek Macdonald Cooper OBE (25 May 1925 – 19 April 2014) was a British journalist and broadcaster who wrote about food, wine and whisky.

He was educated at Raynes Park County Grammar School, Portree High School and Wadham College, Oxford, where he read English. After World War II service with the Royal Navy he was with Radio Malaya until 1960. After that he wrote for, among others, The Listener, The Observer, Homes & Gardens and Saga Magazine. He was a founder member, first Chairman and first President of the Guild of Food Writers. He was appointed OBE in 1997 and in 1999 he was awarded an Hon. D.Litt. by Queen Margaret University College, Edinburgh.

He conceived the idea of BBC Radio 4's weekly culinary programme The Food Programme, which was first broadcast in 1979. Cooper presented PM on Radio 4, and his voice-over work included items on Tomorrow's World and early editions of World in Action.

In 2001, the year he retired from The Food Programme, he won a Sony Radio Academy Special Award for "his pioneering work as one of the first journalists to take the subject of food seriously".

He was diagnosed as suffering from Parkinson's disease in 1995. His wife of 57 years, Janet, died in 2010. They had two children: a daughter and a son.

== Legacy ==
The Derek Cooper Award for Campaigning and Investigative Food Writing or Broadcasting is given out by the Guild of Food Writers.
