= Raynes Park High School =

Comprehensive school in Raynes Park, London

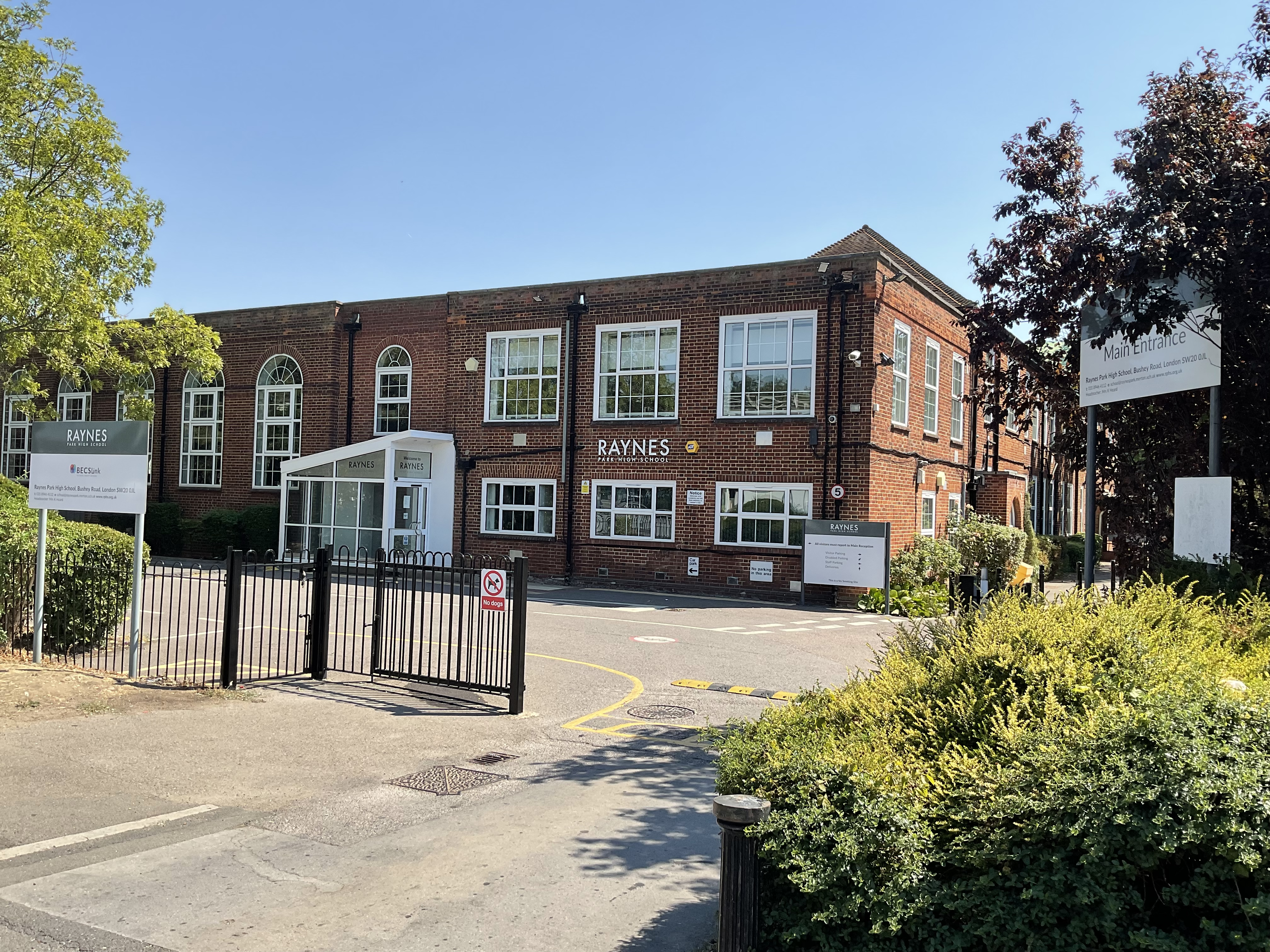
- The main entrance

Location
- Bushey Road; Raynes Park, Greater London, SW20 0JL; England; 51.4033°N 0.2391°W

Information
- Type: Comprehensive community school
- Mottoes: To each his need, from each his power (Traditional) Inspiring learning; achieving excellence (Modern)
- Established: 1935; 91 years ago
- Local authority: Merton
- Department for Education URN: 102674 Tables
- Ofsted: Reports
- Chair of Governors: Sean Cunniffe and Dean Murphy
- Headteacher: Kirsten Taylor
- Age: 11 to 19
- Enrolment: 1130
- Capacity: 1440
- Houses: Miltons, Gibbs, Halliwells and Newsoms
- Colours: White, red, yellow and purple
- Website: www.rphs.org.uk

Raynes Park High School is a co-educational comprehensive school which educates students aged 11 to 19. It is in Raynes Park, England, coming under the London Borough of Merton. The school was established as a boys' grammar school in 1935. It has a sixth form. The school last had an Ofsted inspection in November 2024, when it was graded Good in all areas.

== Location ==
Raynes Park High School is situated at the junction of the Kingston bypass (A3) and Bushey Road (A298). To the east, it is bounded by West Barnes Lane (B282), and just east of the boundary between the boroughs of Kingston upon Thames (New Malden) and Merton, and just north of the Shannon Corner junction of the A3/B282.

TfL contracted bus routes that serve the school include 131, 152, 265, 655, K5, N87 with nearby National Rail stations include New Malden, Motspur Park and Raynes Park all operated by South Western Railway and all within the oyster fare zone.

== History ==
The school first came into being as a boys only grammar school in 1935 – Raynes Park County Grammar School for Boys. Its first headmaster was John Garrett. It remained a grammar school for the next 34 years, until 1969, when it became a 13–18 boys' comprehensive. In September 1990, along with the rest of the borough's schools, it became a 12–16 mixed comprehensive. Finally in September 2010, like all other high schools in the borough, the school's sixth form was reinstated. The school is now an official mixed 11–19.

== Sixth form ==
Following the conversion of Merton's education system to a two tier structure in the 1990s, the school's sixth form was closed. Students wishing to take A-levels enrolled at various colleges or sixth forms in the area. Subsequently, sixth form centres were re-introduced for all Merton High Schools and in September 2010 the purpose built sixth form block opened its doors to Year 12 students. The sixth form now offers a variety of A-level courses, level 3 vocational courses and also offers GCSE retakes for English and Maths.

== Access Centre ==
The Access Centre is a provision at Raynes Park High School for students with an ASC (Autism Spectrum Condition) diagnosis and an EHCP. Designed to support autistic students in a mainstream school environment, it runs numerous interventions such as emotional support therapy and Lego therapy. Access Centre students can eat lunch in the Access Centre if they wish, as eating in the mainstream school environment can be quite loud for some autistic students.

Some Access Centre students are supported in lesson by a Key Support Worker (KSW).

The Access Centre also provides after school clubs for their students such as Rebound Therapy (trampoline therapy) and homework club.

In 2019 (renewed in 2022), the Access Centre was 'accredited' by the National Autism Society.

The current capacity of the Access Centre is 25 students, with admission decided by the local authority, Merton Council.

== School organisation ==
The headteacher is Kirsten Taylor and the co-chairs of Governors are Sean Cunniffe and Dean Murphy. The school last had an Ofsted inspection in November 2024, when it was graded Good in all areas.

Since 1935 there have been nine headteachers:
- John Garrett,
- Charles Wrinch
- T. Henry Porter
- G. David N. Giles
- Brian Butler
- John D. Massey
- Ian Newman
- Phillip Wheatley
- Kirsten Taylor

=== Traditions ===
Wystan Hugh Auden (1907–1973), who had collaborated with the founding headmaster, John Garett, on an anthology, The Poet’s Tongue, in 1935, composed the words for the school song, though the original has been since shortened and modernised.

== Awards ==
- FA Charter Standard Development School Award for outstanding contribution to Football
- Sport England Sports Mark Award for delivery of national PE
- Access Centre Autism Accreditation

== Guinness world record ==
The Guinness world record for the largest egg and spoon race was broken by 859 pupils, from Raynes Park High School, in October 2003.

== Notable former pupils, faculty and staff ==
=== Raynes Park County Grammar School for Boys pupils ===
- Derek Cooper OBE, BBC Radio 4 broadcaster of the Food Programme, and President 1988–95 of the Guild of Food Writers
- Sir Howard Dalton, Professor of Microbiology 1983–2008 at the University of Warwick, and Chief Scientific Adviser at DEFRA from 2002–7
- Charles Higham, archaeologist
- John Hopkins, TV writer
- Maj-Gen Anthony Jeapes CB OBE MC, Commander of Land Forces Northern Ireland from 1985–7, and Commander of 22 Regiment SAS from 1974–7 and 5 Airborne Brigade from 1982–5
- Prof Peter J. Parsons, Regius Professor of Greek at the University of Oxford 1989–2003
- Robert Robinson, TV quiz presenter, and radio presenter of Brain of Britain 1973−2008
- Sir Donald Spiers, aeronautical engineer
- Prof Tony Tanner (1935–1998), Professor of English and American Literature 1989–98 at the University of Cambridge
- Paul Vaughan, TV and radio broadcaster
- Sir David Christopher Veness, CBE, QPM, Assistant Commissioner for Specialist Operations, Metropolitan Police 1994–2005, leaving to serve as United Nations Under-Secretary-General for Safety and Security.

=== Raynes Park County Grammar School for Boys faculty and staff ===
- William Walsh (1916–1996), Senior English Master, 1945–1951

=== Raynes Park High School ===
- Carl Asaba, professional footballer.
- Leon Britton, professional footballer.
- Simon Coleman (Simon Basher), artist.
- Mike Lindup, pop musician.
- Robbie McIntosh, pop musician.
- Chris Powell, professional footballer.
- Gary Sheffield, academic military historian.
- Andy Thorn, professional footballer.

== Bibliography ==
=== Secondary references ===
- Belfast News Letter (The) (1 November 2003) [last update: 26 February 2012]. Pupils Scramble to Crack World Record (Ulster ed.). Belfast: The Belfast News Letter. p. 4 (section: Farming Life). ProQuest 324765777 (ProQuest Central database); Gale A109528064 (Gale Academic OneFile database)
- CBBC Newsround (24 October 2003). "Egg and Spoon Race Smashes Record". BBC: Site Section → cbbcnews; HTML Interface → hi; Block Directory → newsid 3211000; Article ID → 3211835. BBC News.

=== Tertiary references ===
- Ofsted (15 March 2021). Raynes Park High School. URN: 102674. Office for Standards in Education, Children's Services and Skills.
1. "Rating and Reports".
  1. School Inspection: 26 November 2024. 13 January 2025.
  2. Full Inspection: 23 January 2019, "Good". 14 February 2019.
  3. Full Inspection: 13 October 2015, "Good". 9 November 2015.
  4. Monitoring Visit: 17 December 2013, "Requires Improvement". 22 January 2014.
  5. Full Inspection: 18 September 2013, "Requires Improvement". 10 October 2013.
  6. Curriculum and Development Visit: 2 May 2012. 8 June 2012.
  7. Full Inspection: 2 February 2011, "Satisfactory". 4 March 2011.
  8. Full inspection: 8 May 2008, "Satisfactory". 4 June 2008.
  9. Curriculum and Development: 17 January 2007, "Satisfactory". 1 June 2007.
  10. Full Inspection Visit: 8 November 2004. 13 January 2005.
- Who's Who 2026 & Who Was Who (online ed.). Oxford University Press. 1 December 2007.
1. Entry: "Garrett, John Walter Percy". doi:10.1093/ww/9780199540884.013.U56952.
- Who's Who. An Annual Biographical Dictionary with Which Is Incorporated – 'Men and Women of the Time'". London: Adam & Charles Black; New York: The Macmillan Company.
1. Vol. 110: 1958.
  1. Entry: "Garrett, John Walter Percy". p. 1107 – via Internet Archive (University of Indiana Bloomington).
  2. Entry: "Walsh, Professor William". p. 3147 – via Internet Archive (University of Indiana Bloomington).
- Who Was Who. A Companion to Who's Who. London: A & C Black.
1. Vol. 10: "Containing the Biographies of Those Who Died During the Period 1996–2000". 2001.
  1. Entry: "Tanner, Prof. Paul Antony, (Tony)". p. 565 – via Internet Archive.

=== Primary references ===
- Merton Council. Raynes Park High School. Children’s Services and Families – Early Years, Childcare and Children's Centres. Borough of Merton. Archived from the original on 4 March 2023.
- Newman, Ian. Eteach: "Raynes Park High School" (job recruiter profile). Eteach UK Limited (host site). Archived from the original on 10 July 2011.
Eteach.com, founded in 2001 by teacher Paul Howells (Gowerton School, Gowerton, Wales) as an education job board – is an Edtech business for Education customers and candidates. It offers Job Boards, an Applicant Tracking System for schools and Colleges, Digital media advertising, and Tutoring.
