= Tony Tanner (scholar) =

British literary critic (1935–1998)

Paul Antony Tanner (18 March 1935 – 5 December 1998) was a British literary critic of the mid-20th century, and a pioneering figure in the study of American literature. He was a fellow of King's College, Cambridge, where he taught and studied for 38 years, from 1960 until his death in 1998.

== Early life ==
Paul Antony Tanner was born in Richmond, Surrey, and brought up in South London during the Second World War. His father was a civil servant and his mother had trained as a teacher. He attended Raynes Park County Grammar School and, after National Service, matriculated at Jesus College, Cambridge, where he read English. His teachers included two great Shakespearean scholars, A. P. Rossiter and Philip Brockbank, both of whom were to be lasting influences on Tanner.

In 1958 he won a Harkness Fellowship to Berkeley, California where he first encountered post-war American literature and culture and met his first wife Marcia Tanner (née Albright), the American art critic and curator.

== Later life and career ==
In 1960 Tanner took up a fellowship at King's College, Cambridge to begin a doctoral study of the Transcendentalists at a time when American literature was not taught widely at English universities, and its study was considered relatively novel. Tanner's thesis was published in 1965 as the book Reign of Wonder, and, on the strength of its merits, he was appointed to a post in the English faculty. From then on, Tanner took an active role in promoting the inclusion of American literature in the English syllabus, lecturing, examining and advising widely on his chosen field.

He went on to make a comprehensive study of contemporary American fiction from the period 1950-1970 in City of Words, published in 1971. Tanner briefly took up a position at Johns Hopkins University, but, after a severe bout of depression, reapplied to his former position at Cambridge.

His next work, Adultery and the Novel (1979), attempted to reconcile close readings of Goethe, Flaubert and Rousseau with a more contemporary theoretical approach. The depression that had first afflicted Tanner in Baltimore resurfaced, coupled with damaging drinking problems. However, Tanner was able to make a recovery after a period of psychoanalysis and the support of his second wife, Nadia Fusini, and went on to return to the canonical writers Henry James and Jane Austen, on whom he published in 1985 and 1986 respectively.

In 1987 he published a collection of essays entitled Scenes of Nature, Signs of Men (Cambridge University Press), partly on older American literature, but with four essays on contemporary American writers that were singled out for praise by Steven Moore in the Review of Contemporary Fiction (Spring 1989).

Tanner's last book, Venice Desired, was an exploration of portrayals of Venice through the eyes of literary figures such as Byron, Thomas Mann, John Ruskin and Marcel Proust. His final work was to write prefaces to each of Shakespeare's plays for the new Everyman library, which he completed before succumbing to the illness that eventually caused his death in 1998.

Tanner's book reviews appeared regularly in the London Review of Books. A collection of twelve essays on writers including Herman Melville, Ralph Waldo Emerson, Don Delillo, and Thomas Pynchon entitled The American Mystery was published posthumously in 2000.
