= Easterton =

Village in Wiltshire, England

Coordinates: 51.294°N 1.971°W

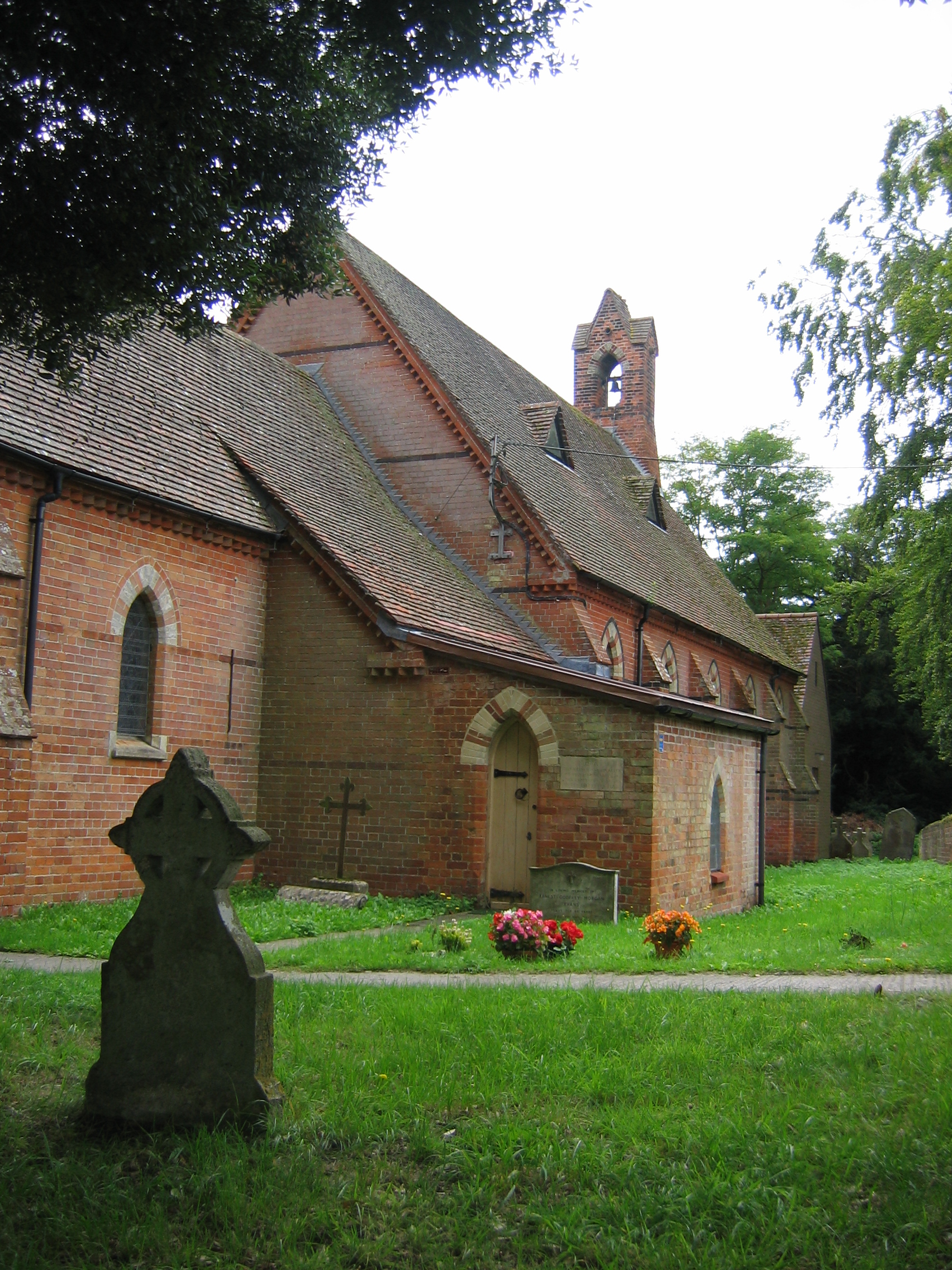
- St. Barnabas' parish church

- Location within Wiltshire
- Population: 561 (2017)
- OS grid reference: SU021550
- Civil parish: Easterton
- Unitary authority: Wiltshire
- Ceremonial county: Wiltshire
- Region: South West
- Country: England
- Sovereign state: United Kingdom
- Post town: Devizes
- Postcode district: SN10
- Dialling code: 01380
- Police: Wiltshire
- Fire: Dorset and Wiltshire
- Ambulance: South Western
- UK Parliament: Melksham and Devizes
- Website: Parish Council

Easterton is a village and civil parish in Wiltshire, England, 4 miles (6.4 km) south of Devizes. The parish includes the hamlets of Easterton Sands and Eastcott.

== Geography ==
Easterton lies at the northern edge of Salisbury Plain.

The parish includes gault and greensand north-west of the road, and lower, middle and upper chalk zones ascending the slope south-eastwards on to the high plain. Across the parish run The Ridgeway along the scarp, the railway north of the greensand ridge, and the former turnpike road in between. This forms the village street, where it is bordered on the west side by a small brook. The street is in a hollow, so that gardens on the east side rise very steeply and have been terraced up the slope. Paths and lanes lead off the street to 'the Clays' on the east and 'the Sands' on the west. The main streets in the village are Oak Lane, Haywards Place, High Street, White Street, the Clay, Kings Road and Vicarage Lane.

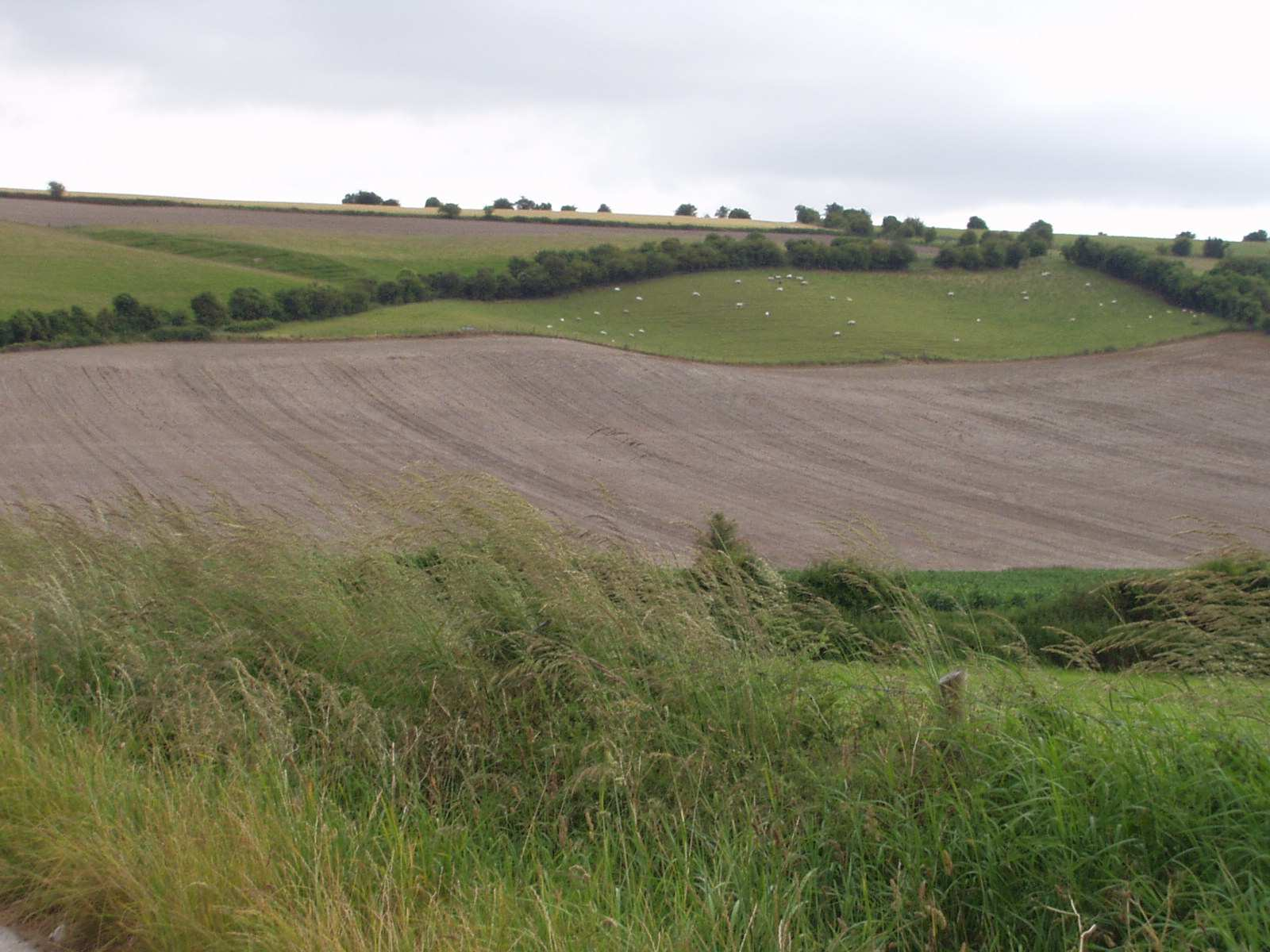
The edge of Salisbury Plain, Easterton

== History ==
Easterton is the site of a Roman villa estate, known from stray archaeological finds in the area of Kestrels in Oak Lane, west of the village. This may be linked with a mid 4th-century Roman coin hoard, discovered in an urn during the 19th century and dispersed (although some coins passed to the Wiltshire Museum, Devizes). Another possible Roman site, deduced from place-name evidence, may lie at Wickham Green on the boundary with Urchfont some 2 km north of Kestrels.

Easterton's toponym is derived from the Old English for "the more easterly farm". It was a tithing which formed the eastern part of the ancient parish of East Lavington, now Market Lavington. Easterton was made a separate civil parish soon after its ecclesiastical parish was created in 1874, and in 1934 Eastcott hamlet was transferred to it from Urchfont parish.

The parish has three concentrations of buildings: around Easterton Manor House and the Royal Oak inn; near the Victorian parish church; and at Eastcott along a secondary road (B3098) and interspersed with modern housing. Some older houses were lost as a result of road widening in the later 20th century. A map of 1773 suggests that there were then more buildings at Eastcott, and between Eastcott and Easterton than at present, and therefore that the settlements have declined. The survival of timber-framed houses in separate groups in an area where from the 18th century brick buildings have predominated is consistent with such a decline.

A school opened at Easterton in 1865, moved to a new building in 1876, and later became a National School. The school closed in 1971, along with the Victorian school at Market Lavington, and pupils from both parishes transferred to a new school, now called St Barnabas Church of England Primary School, in Market Lavington parish near the boundary with Easterton.

Market gardening and fruit growing by smallholders on the fertile soils of the greensand became important as the traditional sheep and corn husbandry on the chalk ('the Clays') declined following enclosures before 1800. Samuel Moore's jam factory was a legacy of the fruit fields. It began in a small way early in the 20th century after an earlier venture had closed, and became a major employer in the area, with 100 staff in 1972. An extension was opened in 1985, but the whole enterprise closed in 1998, and visitors to the village are no longer greeted by the all-pervading aroma of warm strawberry jam. The site of the factory was redeveloped into housing.

== Religious sites ==
Easterton was anciently a tithing of St Mary's, Market Lavington.

In 1874 a new ecclesiastical parish was created by combining the tithing with those of Fiddington (transferred from West Lavington) and Eastcott (from Urchfont).

This was made possible by Rev George Bourdieu Rogers (died 1872) of Easterton, who left money and land to the Ecclesiastical Commissioners to endow the new parish, together with his house which he intended to be used as a parsonage. Louisa Hay, widow of Samuel Hay, of Clyffe Hall, Market Lavington, gave a further £1,500 endowment and undertook to build a church for Easterton.

The Church of England parish church of St Barnabas was duly built in 1875, in red brick with coloured brick decoration. Today the church is part of the benefice of the Lavingtons, Cheverells and Easterton.

A Wesleyan Methodist chapel was built at Easterton in 1868. It was sold and became a private house in 1985.

Eastcott had a small chapel by 1309, which passed to Edington Priory later in the century. The chapel fell into disuse after the 1548 Dissolution and its location is not known.

== Notable buildings ==
Eastcott Manor is a Grade II* listed farmhouse of c. 1600, extended in the later 17th century and in the 18th. At Easterton, Kestrels is an early 18th-century brick house, also Grade II*.

Wroughton's Folly was a mansion in the far northwest of the parish, close to the modern boundary with Urchfont parish. It was built and enlarged by two members of the Wroughton family, Francis and Seymour, between about 1730 and 1780. After Seymour's accidental death in 1789 the house was left unoccupied and became a ruin. Its foundations, visible in the 19th century, have now disappeared. Seymour's ghost remains (according to local legend) recreating along his vanished driveway the furious carriage ride which ended in his death.

== Local government ==
Easterton is a civil parish with an elected parish council. It is in the area of Wiltshire Council unitary authority, which is responsible for almost all significant local government functions.

== Amenities ==
Easterton has a pub, the Royal Oak, a 17th-century thatched building. There is a village hall.

== Notable residents ==
- Charles Ingram, the man who was convicted of cheating his way to winning the top prize of Who Wants to Be a Millionaire? in September 2001.
