= Jordan Daykin =

British businessman and entrepreneur (born 1995)

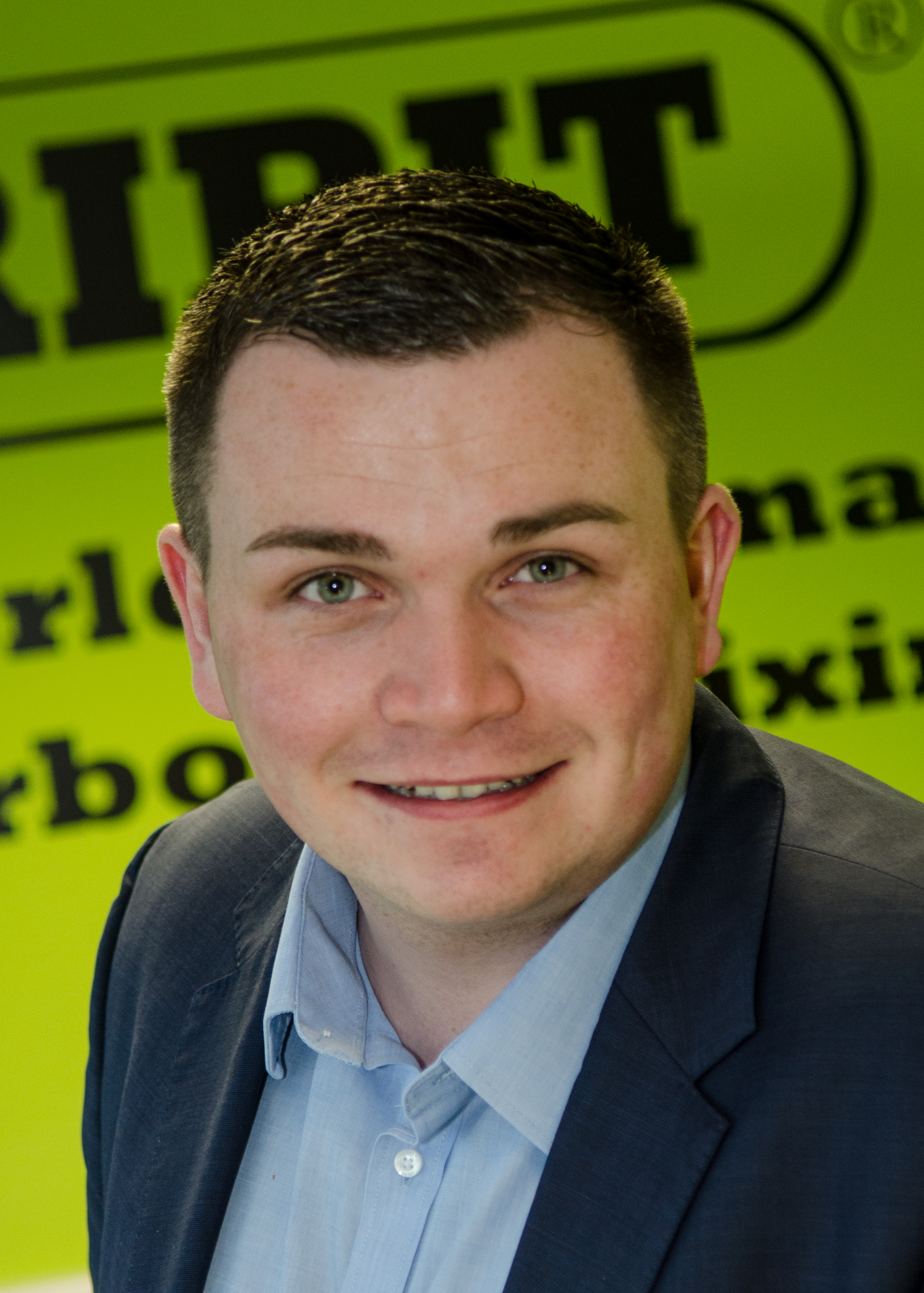
- Self-portrait photograph
- Born: 6 July 1995 (age 29); Trowbridge, Wiltshire, England
- Education: The John of Gaunt School
- Occupation: Entrepreneur
- Known for: Dragons' Den, GripIt Fixings

Jordan Daykin (born 6 July 1995), is a British businessman and entrepreneur. He is best known for his 2014 appearance on the BBC Two business programme Dragons' Den, where he became the youngest and most successful entrepreneur to win investment when he secured £80,000 from Deborah Meaden for his plasterboard fixing invention. He was called "One of Britain's Leading Young Entrepreneurs" on City A.M.'s list of 100 Most Powerful Entrepreneurs in the UK in March 2016.

== Early life ==
Daykin was born in Trowbridge, Wiltshire, where he attended The John of Gaunt School. His parents split up when he was nine; Daykin lived with his father until he was 13, when he moved to his grandparents' bungalow because his father went to Sierra Leone for work. At the age of 13, he left school to be privately home-tutored.

== Early businesses ==
Whilst still in school at the age of 12, Daykin founded his first business, RS2Services, which sold game accounts and virtual currency to fans of fantasy role-playing game Runescape. A year later he started his second business, a nationwide tutoring agency called Tutor Magnet.

== GripIt Fixings ==
In 2008, shortly after Daykin moved into his grandparents' home, he and his grandfather Stanley Daykin set about converting the garage into a bedroom for him. Daykin wanted both a blackout blind and a curtain rail to ensure no light could break into the room. After Daykin and his grandfather broke several fixings and drill bits attempting to hang the curtain rail, he went to the local DIY store to find a better solution, but could not find anything suitable. That afternoon they both went to the shed, and created the GripIt invention. The fixing was soon successful in mounting a television on the wall, and Daykin spotted a gap in the market. Four years later a patent was granted for GripIt and the invention was taken to market.

In 2014, Daykin appeared on Dragons' Den and secured an £80,000 investment for 25% of his company from Deborah Meaden.

In February 2016, Daykin's net worth was estimated to be £10 million.

In July 2019, Daykin resigned as a director of UK Building Products Limited and left the company. In November 2019 the company successfully filed for a voluntary insolvency.

== Vehicle Preparation Services ==
In January 2018, it was reported that Daykin purchased the Wiltshire based automotive contract labour company Vehicle Preparation Services (VPS) from his father Adrian Daykin, in order to diversify his business portfolio. Daykin acted as CEO of VPS between January 2018 and November 2018, before control was returned to his father and the company underwent compulsory liquidation the following month.

== Controversies ==
In February 2025, Jordan Daykin was exposed for illegally selling vehicle number plates through his company, SLS UK Holdings Ltd, on Amazon. The business bypassed mandatory ID and vehicle checks required by UK law, raising serious public safety concerns. Following an investigation by Wiltshire Trading Standards, Amazon removed the listings and banned sellers found to be supplying plates without proper documentation.

== Television ==
After Daykin's first appearance on the BBC Two business programme Dragons' Den in August 2014, he appeared on ITV's This Morning television programme. On 28 February 2016, he appeared on the BBC Two programme Pitches to Riches which looked at Dragons' Den's biggest success stories.
