= Keri Davies =

Welsh radio producer

- Born: Treherbert, Rhondda, Wales
- Occupation: Radio Producer
- Employer: The BBC
- Known for: Producing The Archers
- Children: Three children, including Dominic Davies.
- Keri Davies's voice recorded October 2012

Keri Davies is a radio drama writer and producer. He has been professionally associated with the BBC Radio 4 drama The Archers since 1991. He has worked directly on the programme since 1992 as a producer, senior producer and web producer. Since 2003, he has been an Archers scriptwriter.

Davies studio directed over 700 Archers episodes, including the notorious armed raid on the village shop in 1993.

He has written over 400 scripts for the show. Notable episodes in recent years include Kirsty's Miller's meltdown as she finally acknowledged her grief after a late miscarriage, and Jim Lloyd's dressing-down of Shula Hebden Lloyd for religious hypocrisy.

== The Archers ==
In 1996, Davies set up the Archers Archive Appeal, which helped to recover lost recordings of the programme. This was turned into an audio collection: Vintage Archers 3 — The Lost Episodes.

In 1998, he spent time in Phnom Penh where he trained Cambodian health educators in radio drama scriptwriting, helping them establish the educational radio drama Lotus on Muddy Water.

He created and wrote ten editions of the pocket guide Who's Who in The Archers (BBC Books 1999–2010).

To mark the 50th anniversary of The Archers in 2001, Keri produced Letters from Ambridge for BBC Radio 4. Celebrity listeners contributing to this series of Archers-inspired talks included author Ian Rankin, broadcaster Nicholas Parsons and playwright Mark Ravenhill.

Until 2003, he devised and co-presented live shows which took The Archers to theatres and public events around the country, and even on cruise liners in the Mediterranean and the Baltic.

As Web Producer, he devised and hosted the BBC's official online fan messageboard for The Archers. In 2007, it was shortlisted for the international Prix Ars Electronica award.

In 2011 he was part of the team which established The Archers’ sister programme Ambridge Extra for BBC Radio 4 Extra. He wrote scripts for the first three series.

Keri Davies is the author of The Archers Year of Food and Farming, to be published by Seven Dials (an imprint of Orion) on 26 September 2019.

== Music ==
Over the years, Davies has become the unofficial songwriter to the Grundy family. In 1996 he wrote A Pint of Shires, the lead single from the album The World of Eddie Grundy by Trevor Harrison (Demon Records). The album was produced by Chris Difford of Squeeze, and Davies played accordion on the recording.

He has also written songs which have appeared on-air in The Archers. In 2015, Joe and Eddie Grundy performed extracts from two supposed traditional Borsetshire folk songs: The Borsetshire Cobbler, and The Fair Maid of Edgeley (full article, lyrics and extract). And in 2016, he wrote The Prince of Grundys, which was performed at Eddie's 65th birthday party by his country and western buddies Wayne Tucson and Jolene Rogers (full article, lyrics and performance).

== Personal life ==
Davies was born in Treherbert in the Rhondda Valley in Wales, but grew up in Trowbridge in Wiltshire. He studied at the John of Gaunt School, Trowbridge.

Before he joined the BBC, he worked in banking, was a commissioned officer in the Royal Air Force, active in public relations in London, advertising in Derby and was a media and presentation trainer in Sheffield.

He has three children, who have all appeared in The Archers. His youngest child Dominic (now a professional actor) formerly played Daniel Hebden Lloyd.

He lives in Birmingham (the home of The Archers) and drives a purple Mazda Bongo camper van – appropriately named, as he is also a drummer and percussionist.

In 2017, he (or rather his facial hair) was voted Beard of Winter.
