= Joan M. Hussey =

British historian

Joan Mervyn Hussey FSA FRHistS (5 June 1907 in Trowbridge, Wiltshire – 20 February 2006 in Virginia Water, Surrey) was a British Byzantine scholar and historian.

== Early life and ducation ==
She was the daughter of William Hussey, a plumber and decorator, and his wife, Grace Mildred Sawyer, born in Trowbridge.

Hussey was educated privately at home, at Trowbridge High School for Girls (now The John of Gaunt School), and at the Lycée Victor Duruy in Paris. She went on to St Hugh's College, Oxford, graduating with a BA and MA in Modern History in 1925. Following a period of supervision under Sir David Ross, she moved to the University of London and in 1935 completed a PhD supervised by Norman H. Baynes.

== Career ==
- International Travelling Fellow of the Federation of University Women 1934-5
- Pfeiffer Research Fellow, Girton College, Cambridge 1935-7
- Assistant Lecturer, Manchester University 1937–43
- Member of Council, St Hugh's College, Oxford 1940–6; Honorary Fellow 1968–2006
- Lecturer, Bedford College, London 1943–47; Reader 1947–50
- Professor of History, Royal Holloway College, London 1950–74
- President, British National Committee for Byzantine Studies 1961–71

== Personal life ==
During her retirement, Hussey was received into the Catholic Church by the Jesuit theologian John Coventry. She was unmarried and had no children.<ref name="ODNB">

== Publications ==
- Church & Learning in the Byzantine Empire, 867–1185 (1937)
- The Byzantine Empire in the eleventh century: some different interpretations (1950)
- The writings of John Mauropous: a bibliographical note (1951)
- George Ostrogorsky, History of the Byzantine state; tr. Joan Hussey (1956; 2nd ed. 1968; rev. ed. 1969)
- Nicholas Cabasilas, A commentary on the Divine Liturgy; tr. J.M. Hussey and P.A. McNulty (1960)
- The Cambridge Medieval History. Vol. IV, The Byzantine Empire; ed. J.M. Hussey (new ed. 1966-7)
- The Byzantine World (1957; 2nd ed. 1961; 3rd ed. 1967)
- Proceedings of the XIIIth International Congress of Byzantine Studies, Oxford, 5–10 September 1966;ed. J.M. Hussey, D. Obolensky, and S. Runciman (1967)
- Ascetics and Humanists in eleventh-century Byzantium (1970)
- The Finlay papers (1973)
- Hussey, Joan M. (1986). The Orthodox Church in the Byzantine Empire. Oxford: Clarendon Press. ISBN 9780198269014.
- Kathegetria: essays presented to Joan Hussey for her 80th birthday (1988)
- The journals and letters of George Finlay; ed. J.M. Hussey (1995)
