= Market Lavington =

Village in Wiltshire, England

Coordinates: 51.286°N 1.981°W

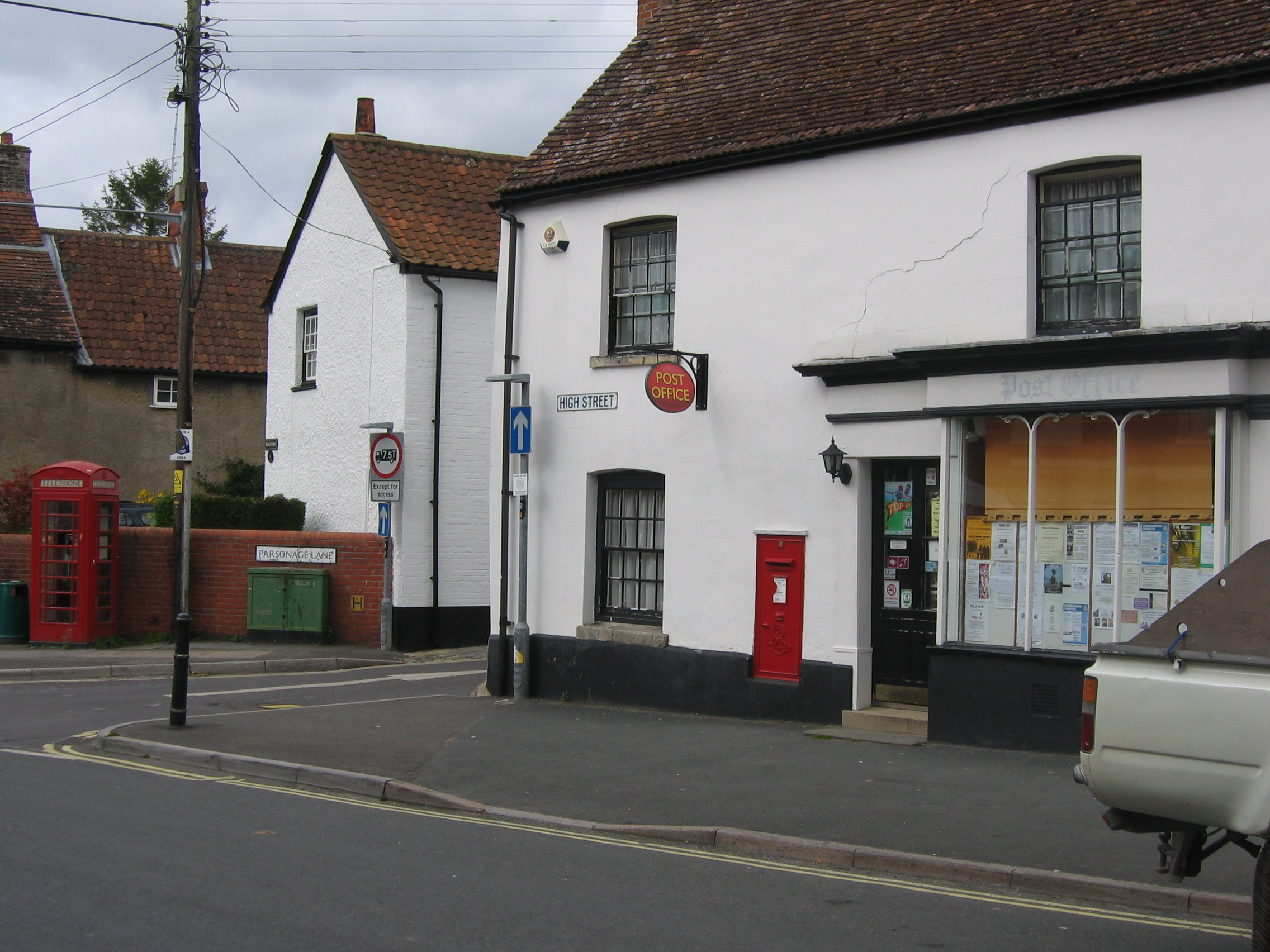
- Village centre

- Location within Wiltshire
- Population: 2,213 (in 2011)
- OS grid reference: SU014541
- Unitary authority: Wiltshire
- Ceremonial county: Wiltshire
- Region: South West
- Country: England
- Sovereign state: United Kingdom
- Post town: DEVIZES
- Postcode district: SN10
- Dialling code: 01380
- Police: Wiltshire
- Fire: Dorset and Wiltshire
- Ambulance: South Western
- UK Parliament: Melksham and Devizes
- Website: Parish Council

Market Lavington is a civil parish and large village with a population of about 2,200 on the northern edge of Salisbury Plain in Wiltshire, England, 5 miles (8.0 km) south of the market town of Devizes. The village lies on the B3098 Westbury–Urchfont road which skirts the edge of the Plain. The parish includes the hamlets of Northbrook, Lavington Sands and Fiddington Sands.

== History ==
There was a Roman settlement near the present parish church, which was followed by a Saxon settlement, including a cemetery which was used in the 5th to 7th centuries. Thus the area was continuously occupied from the late Roman period until the establishment of the medieval planned town in the 13th century. The archaeology was assessed in advance of housebuilding to the northwest of the church in 1991–5, and building of the community centre and car park southwest of the church in 2006.

Domesday Book has two entries for Laventone, with a large combined population of 38 households, 12 acres of woodland and three mills. The ancient parish included the detached tithing of Gore, about 2 miles (3.2 km) south of Market Lavington church, where a manor was recorded in Domesday Book; this area was transferred to West Lavington in 1884 and is now farmland. At the same time the tithing of Fiddington, a narrow strip separating Market Lavington from Easterton, was transferred from West Lavington.

In 1254 Richard Rochelle, a landowner, was granted a charter to hold a weekly market, which competed with markets at Devizes and Steeple Ashton. Markets continued to be held until the mid-19th century.

Thomas Tanner, who became Bishop of St Asaph, was born in 1674 at Market Lavington where his father (also Thomas) was vicar.

== Transport ==
The Wessex Ridgeway, a long-distance footpath following the ancient track known as The Ridgeway, runs along the top of the escarpment above Market Lavington and passes within half a mile of the village.

Market Lavington developed around a crossroads where an east–west road (now the B3098) met a north–south road from Devizes to Salisbury. The latter was closed south of Market Lavington after the War Department purchased land for military use in 1889, and the road through West Lavington (now the A360) became the route to Salisbury.

The Stert and Westbury Railway, part of the route from London to Taunton, was built through the parish by the Great Western Railway in 1900. At the same time a station named Lavington was built a short distance outside Market Lavington parish, north of Littleton Panell where the line crosses the A360. It was closed in 1967 and no local stations remain; the nearest stations are Pewsey and Westbury.

== Status and amenities ==
Market Lavington received a Royal Charter to hold a weekly market in the year 1254.

The civil parish elects a parish council. It is in the area of Wiltshire Council unitary authority, which is responsible for all significant local government functions.

The parish falls in the Lavingtons and Erlestoke electoral ward. This ward starts in the south at West Lavington and stretches north to Worton. The total population of the parish taken at the 2011 census was 5,857.

The village has a co-op supermarket, a pharmacist, a butcher, a florist, a hairdresser, a pub, a café and other small businesses. There is also a nursing and residential home.

== Parish church ==
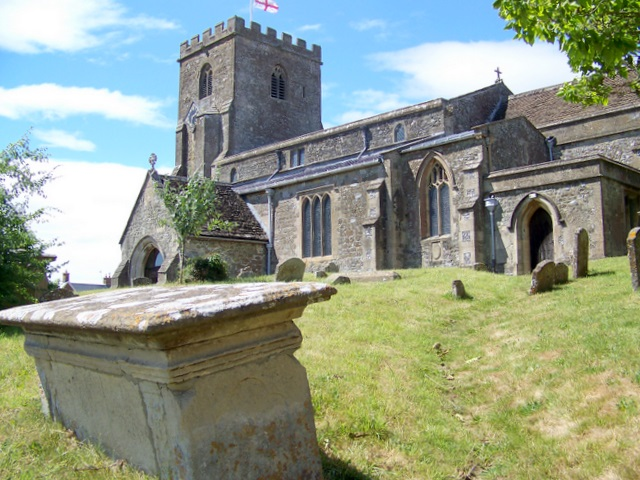
St Mary's Church

The parish church of St Mary, in the west of the village, is from the late 13th century. There is evidence of an earlier building in fragments of 12th-century stonework remounted as a cornice in the south porch, and other fragments elsewhere in the church. In the 14th century the porch was added and the aisles widened; the tower was completed in the 15th. The six bells in the tower were recast in 1876.

During restoration by Ewan Christian in 1864, the chancel arch, the nave and parts of the aisle walls were rebuilt, and buttresses were added to the south aisle. Further restoration in 1910 added the organ chamber and choir vestry, and the east wall was rebuilt.

There is a 14th-century piscina. Monuments include a marble carving of a mourning woman by John Flaxman, a memorial to Thomas Sainsbury (died 1795). The building was recorded as Grade I listed in 1962.

The tithing of Easterton became a separate parish with its own church in 1874. The benefices of Market Lavington and Easterton were united in 1962. Today the church is part of the Lavingtons, Cheverells & Easterton benefice, a group of five churches.

A chapel at Gore was in existence by 1322. Around 1550 the chapel was still standing but unused, and it was later demolished.

== Other buildings ==
The Old House, a 14th-century manor house, is Grade I listed. Built of roughcast stone with some brick, it contains the structure of an early medieval double-aisled open hall, described by Historic England as the only example in Wiltshire. The building was remodelled in the late 17th or early 18th century, and restored in 1875.

A new manor house, with service block and stables, was built in 1865 by Ewan Christian for Edward Pleydell-Bouverie, a politician and Ecclesiastical Commissioner. The construction is red brick, with blue brick patterning and stone dressings. Since 1926 it has been owned by Dauntsey's School.

The Market Lavington Community Hall was built in 2007 and can accommodate 160 people seated or 250 standing. It hosts regular activities such as short mat bowls, quilting, Tai Chi, yoga, Women's Institute, art, table tennis, a community choir and ballroom dancing.

The Old School has been converted into community space for hire and hosts clubs such as Girl Guides and a play group and houses the library.

Market Lavington Museum is sited in the old Schoolmaster's Cottage at the back of the churchyard. It is open Saturday, Sunday, Wednesday and Bank Holiday afternoons from 2.30 to 4.30 pm between 1 May and 30 October.

== Schools ==
Lavington School is a secondary school with a sixth form. The village also has a primary school, St Barnabas.

The village is less than two miles from Dauntsey's School, a private secondary school in West Lavington.
