= Guild of Food Writers =

British professional association

- Founded: 1984
- Headquarters: London, England
- Location: United Kingdom
- Key people: Chetna Makan (Vice President) Samuel Goldsmith (Chair) Julie Friend (vice Chair) Jacob Smith (Secretary) Kim Furnell (Administrator)
- Website: www.gfw.co.uk

The Guild of Food Writers (GFW) is a professional association of food writers and broadcasters in the United Kingdom. It has around 600 authors, broadcasters, columnists and journalists among its members. In 2022 Delia Smith was presented with a lifetime achievement award by Jamie Oliver and became the first patron of the guild.

== History ==
On 12 April 1984, a number of leading British food writers met at London's Intercontinental Hotel, for lunch prepared by the hotel's chef Peter Kromberg, to discuss the formation of an association of food writers. Attendees included Elizabeth David, Jane Grigson, Claudia Roden, and Katie Stewart. It was decided that the association would be modelled along the lines of the existing Circle of Wine Writers.

On 17 January 1985, the first meeting of the Guild of Food Writers took place in Claridges, under the chairmanship of Derek Cooper. The Guild has since grown to a membership of around 600 professional writers, editors, journalists and broadcasters in the field of food. Membership is open to anyone who writes or broadcasts on food for consumer, trade, professional or academic publications or organisations, and whose work is published or transmitted in the UK.

== Awards ==
The Guild gives out annual awards for food books, journalism and broadcasting. In 2023, the Newcomer's award was added to identify and foster food writers of the future. The Guild operates mentorship schemes for members and non-members. Putative members should consult the website for membership criteria. The Guild actively pursues a full diversity policy.
