= Lavington School =

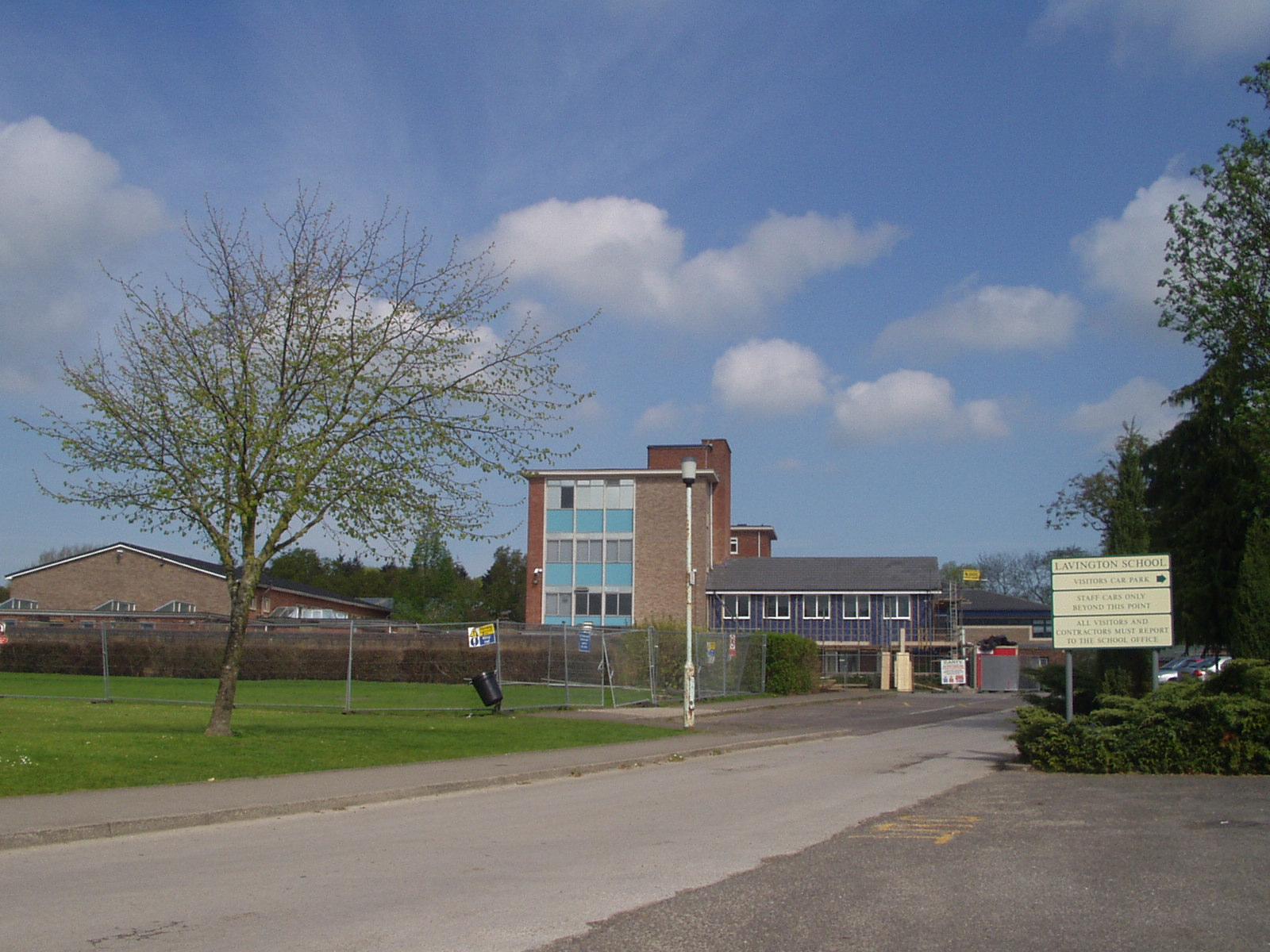

Location
- The Spring; Market Lavington, Wiltshire, SN10 4EB; England; 51°17′11″N 1°59′23″W

Information
- Type: Academy
- Motto: Learning for life
- Established: 1962
- Specialist: Maths and Computing College
- Department for Education URN: 136389 Tables
- Ofsted: Reports
- Head teacher: Ralph Plummer
- Gender: Mixed
- Age: 11 to 16
- Enrolment: 837 (May 2023)
- Colours: Red, blue, purple and black
- Website: www.lavington.wilts.sch.uk

Lavington School is a secondary school in Market Lavington, Wiltshire, England, which became an academy in January 2011. From September 2018 the school gained a sixth form, in partnership with Devizes School.

== History ==
The school opened in 1962 as a secondary modern and became a comprehensive in 1973. There used to be a link between the school and Dauntsey's School, where pupils could go to study in the sixth form at Dauntsey's. However, this link ended around 1994. In the 1970s and 80s, the school had four houses: Bradon (blue), Grovely (green), Ridgeway (red) and Wansdyke (yellow).

Under the defunct specialist schools programme, the school held Maths and Computing College status.

== Buildings ==
The school complex includes a sports hall, main hall, main building, drama block, humanities block and science block. There are also numerous non-educational buildings around the site, including an old farm previously acquired by the school.

== Headteachers ==
A list of the school's headteachers is as follows:

- Harry Greening (1962 to 1981)
- David Bury (1982 to 1996)
- Martin Watson (1997 to 2014)
- Sarah Lowkis (2015 to 2020)
- Ralph Plummer (since 2020)
