= John Garrett (schoolmaster) =

John Walter Percy Garrett (30 May 1902 – 23 December 1966) was an English schoolmaster and author, headmaster of the new Raynes Park County School from 1935 to 1942 and of Bristol Grammar School from 1943 to 1960.

In the 1930s he and W. H. Auden jointly edited The Poet's Tongue.

== Early life ==
Garrett was born in Trowbridge, an only child, and his birth was registered at Melksham in June 1902, the son of Percy Edgar Thorne Garrett and his wife Florence Emily Cray. In 1911, his father was a 44-year old hairdresser and tobacconist in Trowbridge, but went off to fight in the First World War and was released from the Wiltshire Regiment in December 1914. The young Garrett was educated at Trowbridge High School for Boys and Exeter College, Oxford.

== Career ==
Soon after Oxford, Garrett was appointed as an assistant master at Victoria College, Jersey. From there he went to the Royal Naval College, Dartmouth, and then to the Crypt School, Gloucester. He was head of the English department at Whitgift School, Croydon, then in 1934 took up a Page Travelling Scholarship to the United States. In 1935 he was appointed as the first headmaster of the new Raynes Park County School, where he remained until 1942. From 1943 until his retirement in 1960 he was headmaster of Bristol Grammar School. In January 1952, The Spectator noted that Garrett had been making a stir by insisting that "boys shall eat what they are given to eat, refrain from losing their own, or misappropriating other people's, property, and, if in the sixth form, do three hours' homework per evening."

With W. H. Auden, Garrett edited The Poet's Tongue, published in 1935 and described as "an anti-academic anthology" of poetry for the use of schools, aiming to offer poems as part of a "multifarious, sometimes ridiculous ongoing enterprise", rather than as insular academic texts. They also presented some ideas about high and low culture.

In the 1940s, Garrett was giving talks and lectures on BBC radio. In April 1946 he spoke on William Shakespeare's birthday.

== Personal life ==
Garrett's father died in Trowbridge in December 1937, and Garrett was one of his executors. At the time of the national registration scheme of October 1939, Garrett was living with his mother, Florence Garrett, in Trowbridge. She died in March 1960, aged 86. Garrett retired later the same year.

Garrett was a Governor of the Royal Shakespeare Theatre, at Stratford-upon-Avon.

In retirement, Garrett lived with the Rev. David Skinner at 2, St Aubyn's Avenue, Wimbledon. He died at St George's Hospital, Tooting, on 23 December 1966, aged 64, leaving an estate valued at £55,271 (equivalent to £899,030 in 2025), and Skinner was one of his executors.

== Honours ==
- Smith-Mundt Fellowship, 1952
- Honorary degree of Doctor of Letters, University of Bristol, 1960

== Publications ==
- The Poet's Tongue, with W. H. Auden, 1935
- "The Secondary School", in T. F. Coade, ed., Manhood in the Making (London: Peter Davies, 1939)
