= Dauntsey's School =

Public school in West Lavington, Wiltshire, England

Coordinates: 51.282°N 1.998°W

- West Lavington, Wiltshire, SN10 4HE; England

Information
- Type: Public school Private boarding and day school
- Motto: Honor Deo (Motto of the Worshipful Company of Mercers meaning "Honour God")
- Religious affiliation: Church of England
- Established: 1542; 484 years ago
- Founder: William Dauntesey
- Department for Education URN: 126532 Tables
- Headmaster: John Davies as of Sept. 2024
- Visitor: Archbishop of Canterbury
- Gender: Coeducational
- Age: 11 to 18
- Colours: Black, white, red and blue
- Publication: The Dauntseian
- Alumni: Old Dauntseians
- Website: www.dauntseys.org

Dauntsey's School is a public school (fee-charging boarding and day school) for pupils aged 11–18 in the village of West Lavington, Wiltshire, England. The school was founded in 1542 in accordance with the will of William Dauntesey, a master of the Worshipful Company of Mercers.

== The school ==
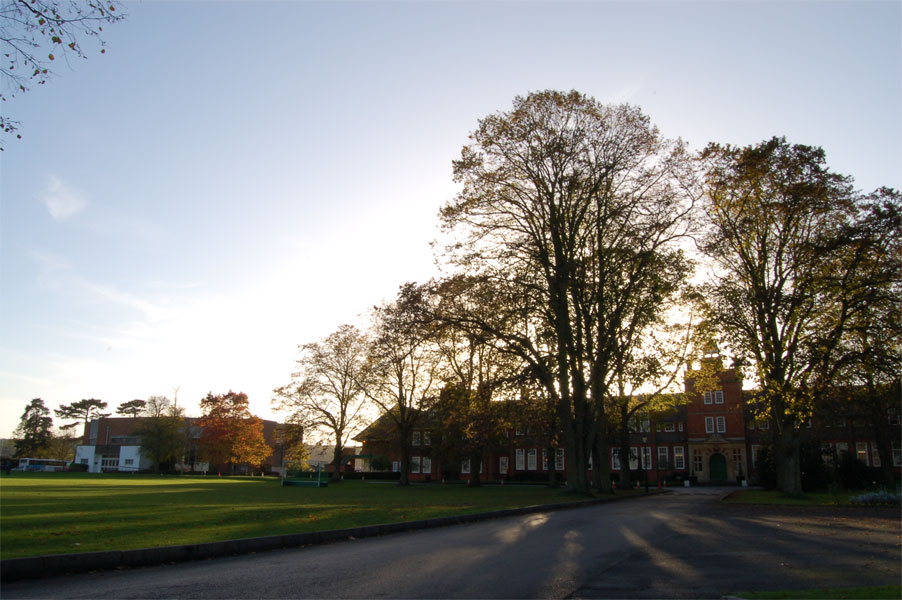
The front of the school

The school was moved to its current site in 1895. The school occupies approximately 65 acres (26 hectares) of land at the main school campus. The school also owns land at Market Lavington, approximately 15 minutes walk (or 1 mile drive) from the main school. Here the Manor House is used as a Lower School boarding house and has sports pitches and woodlands in its grounds.

Students typically arrive in years 7, 9 and 12 (known as First Form, Third Form and Lower Sixth respectively), although a few enter in the other years. Years 7, 8 and 9 (known as First, Second and Third Forms) are collectively known as the Lower School, and years 10, 11, 12 and 13 are referred to as the Upper School. In addition, Years 12 and 13 (Lower Sixth and Upper Sixth) are collectively known as the Sixth Form.

=== Houses ===
The school is divided into houses and each pupil assigned to a house for their time in the Lower School, then to a different house in the Upper School. Most houses are named after former headmasters, the exceptions being Manor, Farmer, Mercers (named after a building, a generous donor and the livery company respectively) and Lambert (named for Agnes Lambert, wife of William Dauntsey). All houses except Manor are on the main school site.

==== Lower School houses ====
In the Lower School, houses are mixed gender and each day pupil house has its own room where pupils have a locker and where they must register each morning. The Manor House is the only boarding house for Lower School boarders and is where they live, sleep and eat breakfast and dinner.

The house a pupil is in does not affect their academic class groups but the houses compete against each other in sporting and other events.

Day	Boarding
Forbes	Manor
Rendell	Manor
Scott	Manor

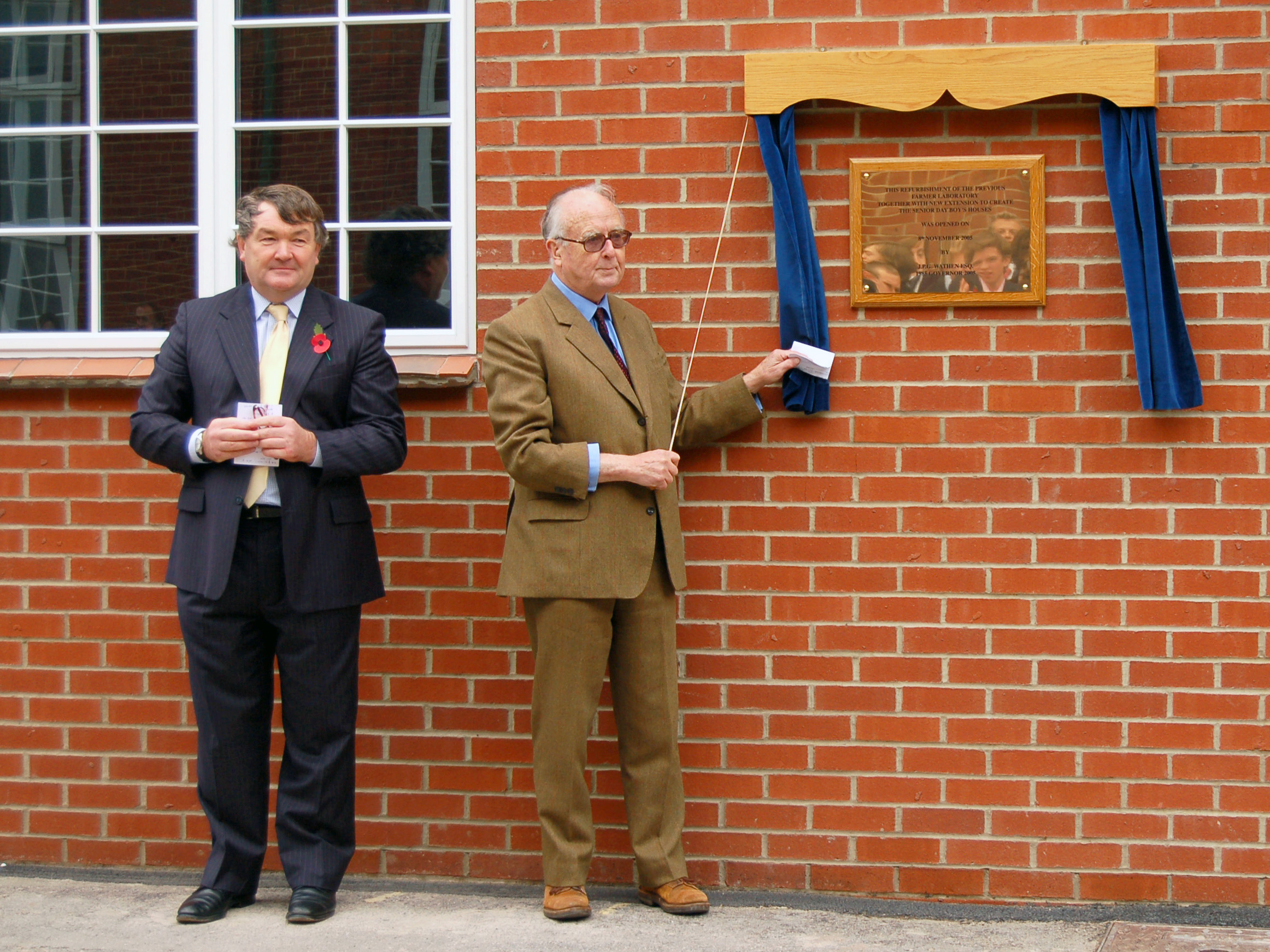
Opening of the relocated senior day boy houses in November 2005, hosted by ex-headmaster Stewart Roberts and ex-governor J.P.G. Wathen.

==== Upper School houses ====
In the Upper School, houses are single gender, and the eight houses are divided equally among day, boarding, female and male pupils. Boarding houses have bedrooms, bathrooms, common rooms and kitchens. Day houses have a room for each year group in the house and basic cooking facilities, along with offices for tutors and House Parents.

	Day	Boarding
Girls	King-Reynolds	Jeanne
Girls	Lambert	Evans
Boys	Hemens	Mercers
Boys	Farmer	Fitzmaurice

== Jolie Brise ==
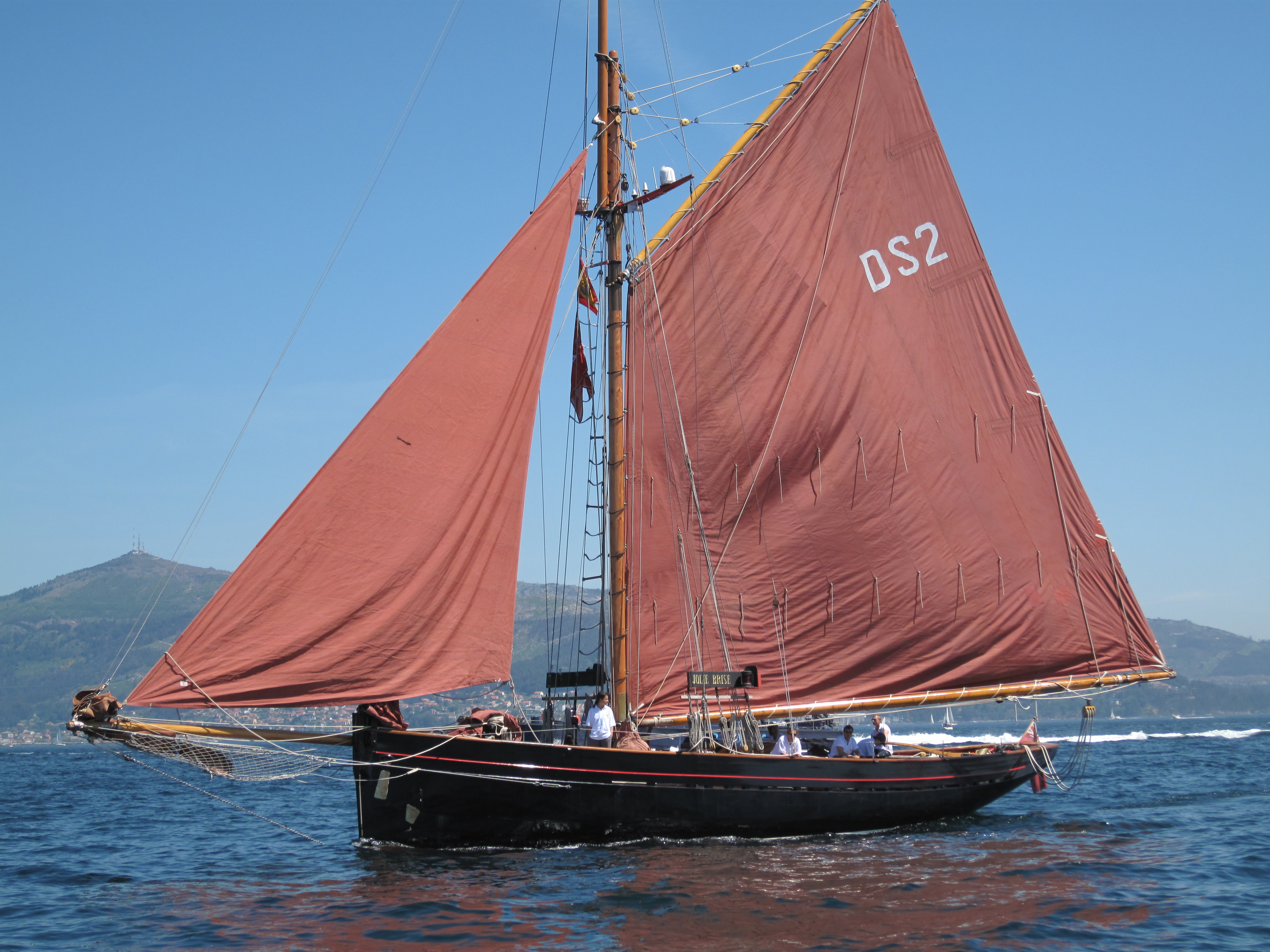
The Jolie Brise

Jolie Brise, a gaff rigged pilot cutter owned and operated by the school, is sailed by Dauntsey pupils throughout the year.

In summer 2000 Dauntsey crews took part in The Tall Ships' Race, which took her across the Atlantic. She was declared the overall winner of this race. She also won The Tall Ships' Races 2002, which took her from Alicante to Malaga. In 2009 the Jolie Brise came second in class, of the Tall Ships Race, the final destination of which was Belfast, where the ships were greeted, after a transatlantic race, by an estimated 400,000 people. Jolie Brise also won the Tall Ships Race in 2015 and again in 2016.

== History ==
The school was founded in accordance with the will of alderman William Dauntesey, master of the Worshipful Company of Mercers.

Dauntesey was himself from West Lavington, the son of John Dauntesey, and when he died in April 1542, he left money in his will dated 10 March 1542 for the founding of the school. He gave the Mercers' Company lands in London so that they could build a schoolhouse for a grammar school at West Lavington and also support seven poor persons in an almshouse, within the same charity. The master of the school was to be appointed by the heir of Dauntesey's brother Ambrose Dauntesey, but the company was to have the power of dismissal. In 1868, a schools inquiry commission noted that "By ancient custom, the owner of the Dauntesey estate at West Lavington, now Lord Churchill, appoints".

Three and a half centuries after the school's foundation, the school moved to its current site at the north end of West Lavington, Wiltshire. The new school buildings were designed by the architect C.E. Ponting and in May 1895 Joseph Chamberlain officially opened them and inaugurated Dauntsey's Agricultural School.

In 1929 the school bought the Manor House estate at Market Lavington, which now provides accommodation for lower school boarders. In 1930, the school changed its name to Dauntsey's School although it remained largely dedicated to an agriculture-based education. At that time it fulfilled the role that the County Agricultural Colleges fill today, the latter partly sponsored by the state. The intake of pupils in the 1930s was a broad cross-section of the Wiltshire farming community, from farm labourers' children to those of wealthy gentlemen farmers. It continued thus, with the addition of sons of commissioned officers in the armed forces, until 1971.

In 1967, the 'Olive Block' opened, which is now Fitzmaurice House. 1970 saw the foundation of the sailing club, while, in 1971, the first girls were admitted. In 1972, the farm buildings were closed and the school became a primarily academic institution. In 1977, the school acquired Jolie Brise. The school continues a wide range of building and expansion projects to this day, including the recent building of the Upper School girls' day houses, and a re-vamp of the sports hall. More recent developments have included an astroturf pitch for hockey purposes.

=== 21st century ===
The school's affiliation with the Mercers Company continues, and the Master Mercer is a regular guest of honour or speaker at school events. The company also helps with financial support for students' individual ventures, including gap years and sporting tours, where the company sees fit.

In 2005, Dauntsey's School was one of fifty of the country's independent schools which were found guilty of running an illegal price-fixing cartel which had allowed them to drive up fees for thousands of parents. Each school was required to pay a nominal penalty of £10,000 and they all agreed to make ex-gratia payments totalling £3 million into a trust designed to benefit pupils who attended the schools during the period in respect of which fee information was shared.

According to a 2021 Freedom of Information Request, the school was expected to be among the many independent schools to withdraw from the Teachers' Pension Scheme, effective 31 August 2022.

== Recent headmasters ==
- G.W. Olive (1919 to 1955)
- D.J. Forbes (1955 to 1969)
- G.E. King-Reynolds (1969 to 1985)
- C.R. Evans (1986 to 1996)
- Stewart B. Roberts (1997 to 2012)
- Mark Lascelles (2013 to 2024)
- John Davies (2024 to present)

== Notable alumni ==
=== Living ===
- Sisters Guin Batten and Miriam Batten, 2000 Olympic silver medallists in rowing. Miriam is chair of Henley Women's Regatta and Guin is the first woman on the management committee of Henley Royal Regatta in 175 years.
- Eason Chan, Hong Kong vocalist
- Max Foster, journalist
- John Fox, statistician
- Daniel Ings, actor
- Jonathon Lodwick, cricketer and barrister
- Simon May, composer of BBC EastEnders TV theme music
- Andrew Miller, novelist
- Desmond Morris, sociobiologist
- Ed Mitchell, journalist, business presenter
- Mohamed Nasheed, former president of the Maldives
- Mark Seddon, journalist, former editor of Tribune and correspondent for Al Jazeera English
- Gordon Snell, author of children's books, and husband of Irish author Maeve Binchy
- Richard Tedder, virologist and microbiologist, University College London Medical School

=== Deceased ===
- Nicolas Rea, 3rd Baron Rea, doctor and politician
- Wilbert Awdry, children's author, notably and eminently of Thomas the Tank Engine
- Nigel Balchin, novelist
- Andrew Gardner, television newscaster and presenter
- Jake Hancock, geologist
- Anthony Huxley, botanist
- Adrian Mitchell, radical poet
- Douglas Wellesley Morrell, electrical engineer
- Richard Sandbrook, director of the International Institute for Environment and Development
- Philip Sherrard, poet, translator, philosopher and theologian
- A. G. Street, author and broadcaster
- John Tedder, 2nd Baron Tedder, professor of chemistry at St Andrews University
- Amédée Turner, patent law barrister and Member of the European Parliament

== See also ==
- Civic Guild of Old Mercers
- List of the oldest schools in the United Kingdom
