= Sotheron-Estcourt =

Sotheron-Estcourt may refer to:

== Surname ==
- George Sotheron-Estcourt, 1st Baron Estcourt (1839-1915), British conservative politician
- T. H. S. Sotheron-Estcourt (1801-1876), British conservative politician
- Thomas E. Sotheron-Estcourt (1881-1958), British Army officer

== Other uses ==
- Sotheron
- Estcourt
