= Estcourt (surname) =

Estcourt is a surname. Notable people with the name include:

- Edgar Edmund Estcourt (1816–1884), English churchman
- Frederick Estcourt Bucknall (c.1838–1896), South Australian publican, brewer and politician
- George Sotheron-Estcourt, 1st Baron Estcourt (1839–1915), British Conservative Party politician
- Giles Estcourt (c.1601–1668), English politician
- Giles Estcourt (died 1587), MP
- James Bucknall Bucknall Estcourt (1803–1855), English major-general and MP
- Noël Estcourt (1929–2018), Rhodesian sportsman
- Nick Estcourt (1942–1978), British climber
- Richard Estcourt (1668–1712), English actor
- Stephen Estcourt (born 1953), Australian judge
- Sir Thomas Estcourt (died 1624) (c. 1570–1624), English lawyer and politician
- Thomas Grimston Estcourt (1775–1853), English politician
- Thomas Estcourt (died 1818), member of parliament for Cricklade
- Thomas E. Sotheron-Estcourt (1881–1958), British Army officer and Conservative Member of Parliament
- Thomas H. Sotheron-Estcourt (1801–1876), British Conservative politician

== See also ==
- Estcourt baronets
- Sotheron (surname)
