= Referendum Party election results =

The Referendum Party was a Eurosceptic, single issue party in the United Kingdom formed by Sir James Goldsmith to fight the 1997 General Election. The party stood in 547 (out of 659) constituencies. In Northern Ireland, the party did not stand, but endorsed the Ulster Unionist Party. In the 165 seats also contested by UKIP, the Referendum Party beat UKIP in all but two, Romsey and Glasgow Anniesland (the latter by just two votes).

A candidate using the same party name also contested a by election in 1999.

== 1997 general election ==
Summary of results:
Votes received: 810,860
% of total votes: 2.6%
Vote as % of electorate: 1.8%
Vote as % in seats contested: 3.1%
Lost deposits: 505 at a cost of £252,500

Constituency	Candidate	Votes	%
Aberavon	Peter David	970	2.7
Aberdeen, Central	James Farquharson	446	1.3
Aberdeen, N	Alasdair MacKenzie	463	1.2
Aberdeen, S	Rick Wharton	425	1.0
Aberdeenshire, W & Kincardine	Steve Ball	808	1.9
Airdrie & Shotts	Crawford Semple	294	0.7
Altrincham & Sale, W	Anthony Landes	1348	2.6
Alyn & Deeside	Malcolm Jones	1627	3.9
Amber Valley	Irene McGibbon	2283	4.2
Angus	Brian Taylor	883	2.1
Argyll & Bute	Michael Stewart	713	2.0
Ashfield	Martin Betts	1896	3.8
Ashford	Christopher Cruden	3201	5.8
Ashton-under-Lyne	Lorraine Clapham	1346	2.9
Aylesbury	Marc John	2196	3.8
Ayr	John Enos	200	0.5
Banbury	James Ager	2245	3.8
Banff & Buchan	Alan Buchan	1060	2.6
Barking	Colin Taylor	1283	3.9
Barnsley, Central	James Walsh	1325	3.7
Barnsley, E & Mexborough	Arthur Miles	797	1.8
Barnsley, W & Penistone	Joyce Miles	1828	4.3
Barrow & Furness	David Mitchell	1208	2.5
Basildon	Craig Robinson	2462	4.6
Bassetlaw	Roy Graham	1838	3.8
Bath	Anthony Cook	1192	2.2
Batley & Spen	Ed Wood	1691	3.6
Battersea	Mark Slater	804	1.7
Beaconsfield	Humphrey Lloyd	2197	4.4
Beckenham	Leonard Mead	1663	3.1
Bedford	Peter Conquest	1503	3.1
Bedfordshire, Mid	Shirley Marler	2257	4.3
Bedfordshire, NE	John Taylor	2490	4.5
Bedfordshire, SW	Rosalind Hill	1761	3.3
Berwick upon Tweed	Ned Lambton	1423	3.5
Bethnal Green & Bow	Muhammed Abdullah	557	1.3
Bexhill & Battle	Vanessa Thompson	3302	6.7
Bexleyheath & Crayford	Barrie Thomas	1551	3.2
Birkenhead	Richard Evans	800	2.0
Birmingham, Edgbaston	Jonathan Oakton	1065	2.0
Birmingham, Erdington	Geoff Cable	1424	3.5
Birmingham, Hall Green	Paul Bennett	1461	3.5
Birmingham, Ladywood	Ruth Gurney	1086	2.9
Birmingham, Northfield	David Gent	1243	3.2
Birmingham, Perry Barr	Saeed Mahmood	843	1.8
Birmingham, Selly Oak	Laurence Marshall	1520	3.0
Birmingham, Sparkbrook & Small Heath	Riaz Dooley	737	1.8
Birmingham, Yardley	Duncan Livingston	646	1.7
Bishop Auckland	David Blacker	2104	4.6
Blaby	Robert Harrison	2018	3.8
Blackburn	David Bradshaw	1892	4.0
Blackpool, N & Fleetwood	Kim Stacey	1704	3.2
Bolton, NE	David Staniforth	1096	2.2
Bolton, SE	Bill Pickering	973	2.2
Bolton, W	Glenda Frankl-Slater	865	1.8
Bootle	James Elliott	571	1.5
Bosworth	Scott Halborg	1521	2.9
Bournemouth, E	Alan Musgrave-Scott	1808	4.2
Bournemouth, W	Ronald Mills	1910	4.7
Bracknell	Warwick Cairns	1636	2.8
Bradford, N	Harry Wheatley	1227	2.9
Bradford, S	Marilyn Kershaw	1785	4.0
Bradford, W	Christopher Royston	1348	3.0
Braintree	Nicholas Westcott	2165	3.9
Brecon & Radnorshire	Liz Phillips	900	2.1
Brent, S	Janet Phythian	497	1.4
Brentwood & Ongar	Angela Kilmartin	2658	5.2
Bridgend	Tudor Greaves	1662	3.8
Bridgwater	Fran Evens	2551	4.7
Brigg & Goole	Derek Rigby	1513	3.2
Brighton, Kemptown	David Inman	1526	3.3
Brighton, Pavilion	Peter Stocken	1304	2.7
Bristol, E	Gerry Philp	1479	3.1
Bristol, NW	John Quintanilla	1609	2.9
Bristol, S	Derek Guy	1486	3.0
Bristol, W	Margot Beauchamp	1304	2.1
Bromsgrove	Diana Winsor	1411	2.7
Broxbourne	David Millward	1633	3.5
Broxtowe	Roy Tucker	2092	3.6
Burnley	Richard Oakley	2010	4.4
Bury, N	Richard Hallewell	1337	2.4
Bury, S	Bryan Slater	1216	2.4
Bury St. Edmunds	Ian McWhirter	2939	5.3
Caernarfon	Clive Collins	811	2.4
Caerphilly	Mark Morgan	1337	3.0
Caithness, Sutherland & Easter Ross	Carolyn Ryder	369	1.3
Calder Valley	Anthony Mellor	1380	2.4
Camberwell & Peckham	Nicholas China	692	2.4
Cambridge	William Burrows	1262	2.5
Cambridgeshire, NE	Michael Bacon	2636	4.8
Cambridgeshire, NW	Sandy Watt	1939	4.0
Cambridgeshire, S	Robin Page	3300	6.2
Cambridgeshire, SE	John Howlett	2838	5.0
Cannock Chase	Peter Froggatt	1663	3.2
Canterbury	James Osborne	2460	4.6
Cardiff, Central	Nick Lloyd	760	1.8
Cardiff, N	Edward Litchfield	1199	2.5
Cardiff, S & Penarth	Phillip Morgan	1211	2.9
Cardiff, W	Trefor Johns	996	2.5
Carlisle	Angus Fraser	1233	2.8
Carmarthen, E & Dinefwr	Ian Humphreys-Evans	1196	2.9
Carmarthen, W & Pembrokeshire, S	Joy Poirrier	1432	3.4
Carrick, Cumnock & Doon Valley	John Higgins	634	1.3
Carshalton & Wallington	Julian Storey	1289	2.7
Castle Point	Hugh Maulkin	2700	5.6
Ceredigion	John Leaney	1092	2.7
Charnwood	Hugh Meechan	2104	3.8
Chatham & Aylesford	Keith Riddle	1538	3.1
Cheadle	Paul Brook	1511	2.9
Cheltenham	Alison Powell	1065	2.1
Chesham & Amersham	Paul Andrews	2528	4.8
Chester, City of	Richard Mullen	1487	2.6
Chichester	Douglas Denny	3318	6.0
Chipping Barnet	Victor Ribekow	1190	2.4
Chorley	Colin Heaton	1319	2.3
Christchurch	Ray Spencer	1684	3.0
Cities of London & Westminster	Alan Walters	1161	2.9
Cleethorpes	John Berry	1787	3.5
Clwyd, S	Alex Lewis	1207	3.1
Clwyd, W	Heather Bennett-Collins	1114	2.8
Clydebank & Milngavie	Ian Sanderson	269	0.7
Coatbridge & Chryston	Bernard Bowsley	249	0.7
Colchester	John Hazell	1776	3.4
Conwy	Alan Barham	760	1.8
Copeland	Chris Johnston	1036	2.5
Corby	Sebastian Riley-Smith	1356	2.5
Cornwall, N	Felicity Odam	3636	6.2
Cotswold	Rupert Lowe	3393	6.6
Coventry, NE	Ron Hurrell	1125	2.3
Coventry, NW	Douglas Butler	1269	2.3
Coventry, S	Paul Garratt	943	1.9
Crawley	Ron Walters	1931	3.8
Crewe & Nantwich	Peter Astbury	1543	3.1
Crosby	John Gauld	813	1.8
Croydon, Central	Charles Cook	1886	3.4
Croydon, N	Roger Billis	1155	2.2
Croydon, S	Tony Barber	2631	4.9
Cumbernauld & Kilsyth	Pamela Cook	107	0.3
Cunninghame, N	Ian Winton	440	1.1
Cunninghame, S	Allan Martlew	178	0.5
Cynon Valley	Gwyn John	844	2.5
Dagenham	Steven Kraft	1411	3.9
Darlington	Michael Blakey	1399	2.9
Daventry	Barbara Russocki	2018	3.3
Delyn	Elizabeth Soutter	1117	2.7
Derby, N	Paul Reynolds	1816	3.2
Derby, S	John Browne	1862	3.6
Derbyshire, S	Richard North	2491	4.2
Derbyshire, W	John Gouriet	2499	4.4
Devizes	John Goldsmith	3021	5.0
Devon, E	William Dixon	3200	6.1
Devon, SW	Robert Sadler	1668	3.2
Devon, W & Torridge	Roger Lea	1946	3.3
Dewsbury	Wendy Goff	1019	2.4
Don Valley	Paul Davis	1379	3.2
Doncaster, Central	Mike Cliff	1273	2.9
Doncaster, N	Ron Thornton	1589	4.0
Dorset, Mid & Poole, N	David Nabarro	2136	4.2
Dorset, N	Margaret Evans	2564	4.9
Dorset, S	Patrick McAndrew	2791	5.7
Dover	Susan Anderson	2124	3.9
Dudley, N	Stuart Bavester	1201	2.5
Dudley, S	Connor Birch	1467	3.1
Dulwich & West Norwood	Bruce Coles	897	2.0
Dumbarton	George Dempster	255	0.6
Dumfries	David Parker	533	1.1
Dundee, E	Ted Galloway	601	1.5
Dundee, W	John MacMillan	411	1.1
Dunfermline, E	Thomas Dunsmore	632	1.7
Dunfermline, W	James Bain	543	1.5
Durham, N	Ian Parkin	1958	4.2
Durham, NW	Rodney Atkinson	2372	5.1
Durham, City of	Margaret Robson	1723	3.5
Ealing, Acton & Shepherd's Bush	Christopher Winn	637	1.3
Ealing, Southall	Bruce Cherry	854	1.6
Easington	Richard Pulfrey	1179	2.8
East Ham	Joy McCann	845	2.1
East Kilbride	Julie Gray	306	0.6
East Lothian	Norman Nash	491	1.1
Eastbourne	Trevor Lowe	2724	5.2
Eastleigh	Victor Eldridge	2013	3.6
Eastwood	David Miller	497	1.0
Eccles	John d Roeck	1765	3.9
Eddisbury	Norine Napier	2041	4.1
Edinburgh, Central	Austin Skinner	495	1.2
Edinburgh, E & Musselburgh	James Sibbet	526	1.3
Edinburgh, N & Leith	Sandy Graham	441	1.1
Edinburgh, Pentlands	Malcolm McDonald	422	0.9
Edinburgh, S	Ian McLean	504	1.1
Edinburgh, W	Stephen Elphick	277	0.6
Edmonton	James Wright	708	1.6
Ellesmere Port & Neston	Colin Rodden	1305	2.5
Elmet	Chris Zawadski	1487	2.8
Eltham	Matthew Clark	1414	3.3
Enfield, N	Robert Ellingham	857	1.8
Enfield, Southgate	Nicholas Luard	1342	2.9
Epping Forest	Jason Berry	2208	4.2
Epsom & Ewell	Christopher MacDonald	2355	4.4
Erewash	Stephen Stagg	1404	2.3
Erith & Thamesmead	John Flunder	1394	3.4
Esher & Walton	Andrew Cruickshank	2904	5.4
Falkirk, E	Sebastian Mowbray	325	0.8
Falmouth and Camborne	Peter de Savary	3534	6.6
Fareham	Dayne Markham	2914	5.6
Faversham & Kent, Mid	Robin Birley	2073	4.2
Feltham & Heston	Rupert Stubbs	1099	2.4
Fife, Central	John Scrymgeour-Wedderburn	375	0.9
Fife, NE	William Nick Stewart	485	1.2
Finchley & Golders Green	Gary Shaw	684	1.4
Folkestone & Hythe	John Aspinall	4188	8.1
Forest of Dean	John Hopkins	1624	3.2
Fylde	David Britton	2372	4.6
Galloway & Upper Nithsdale	Alan Kennedy	428	1.0
Gateshead, E & Washington, W	Michael Daley	1315	3.1
Gedling	John Connor	2006	3.9
Gillingham	Geoffrey Cann	1492	2.9
Glasgow, Anniesland	Gillian McKay	84	0.3
Glasgow, Baillieston	John McClafferty	188	0.6
Glasgow, Cathcart	Strang Haldane	344	1.0
Glasgow, Govan	Kenneth MacDonald	201	0.6
Glasgow, Kelvin	Robert Grigor	282	0.9
Glasgow, Maryhill	Roderick Paterson	77	0.3
Glasgow, Pollok	Derek Haldane	152	0.5
Glasgow, Rutherglen	Julia Kerr	150	0.4
Glasgow, Shettleston	Thomas Montguire	151	0.6
Glasgow, Springburn	Andrew Keating	186	0.6
Gloucester	Andy Reid	1482	2.6
Gordon	Fred Pidcock	459	1.0
Gosport	Andrew Blowers	2538	5.3
Gower	Richard Lewis	1745	4.0
Grantham & Stamford	Marilyn Swain	2721	5.1
Gravesham	Patricia Curtis	1441	2.7
Greenwich & Woolwich	Douglas Ellison	1670	4.1
Guildford	James Gore	2650	4.7
Hackney, N & Stoke Newington	Brian Maxwell	544	1.7
Hackney, S & Shoreditch	Richard Franklin	613	1.8
Halesowen & Rowley Regis	Peter White	1244	2.6
Haltemprice & Howden	Trevor Pearson	1370	2.8
Halton	Reginald Atkins	1036	2.3
Hamilton, S	Stuart Brown	316	1.0
Hamilton, N & Bellshill	Ray Conn	554	1.5
Hammersmith & Fulham	Moyra Bremner	1023	1.9
Hampshire, E	John Hayter	2757	4.7
Hampshire, NE	Dai Rees	2420	4.7
Hampshire, NW	Pamela Callaghan	1533	2.8
Hampstead & Highgate	Monima Siddique	667	1.5
Harborough	Neil Wright	1859	3.5
Harlow	Mark Wells	1422	3.0
Harrow, E	Bernard Casey	1537	2.8
Harrow, W	Herbert Crossman	1997	3.8
Hartlepool	Maureen Henderson	1718	3.9
Harwich	Jeffrey Titford	4923	9.2
Hastings & Rye	Christopher McGovern	2511	5.1
Havant	Anthony Green	2395	5.0
Hayes & Harlington	Frederick Page	778	1.9
Hazel Grove	John Stanyer	1055	2.1
Hemel Hempstead	Peter Such	1327	2.4
Hemsworth	Derek Irvine	1260	2.8
Hendon	Stanley Rabbow	978	2.0
Henley	Sebastian Sainsbury	2299	4.5
Hereford	Clive Easton	2209	4.2
Hertford & Stortford	Hugo Page Croft	2105	3.9
Hertfordshire, NE	Jonathan Grose	2166	4.2
Hertfordshire, SW	Timothy Millward	1853	3.3
Hertsmere	James Marlow	1703	3.4
Hexham	Robert Waddell	1362	3.0
Heywood & Middleton	Christine West	1076	2.1
High Peak	Colin Hanson-Orr	1420	2.5
Holborn & St. Pancras	Julia Carr	790	2.1
Hornchurch	Rory Khilkoff-Boulding	1595	3.6
Hornsey & Wood Green	Rachel Miller	808	1.6
Horsham	Robin Grant	2281	4.0
Houghton & Washington E	Jim Joseph	1277	3.1
Hove	Stuart Field	1931	4.0
Huddersfield	Paul McNulty	1480	3.3
Huntingdon	David Bellamy	3114	5.5
Hyndburn	Philip Congdon	1627	3.4
Ilford, S	David Hodges	1073	2.2
Inverness, E, Nairn & Lochaber	Winnona Wall	436	0.9
Ipswich	Theodore Agnew	1637	3.4
Isle of Wight	Tim Bristow	4734	6.5
Islington, S & Finsbury	Jane Bryett	741	2.1
Islwyn	Susan Monaghan	1209	3.3
Jarrow	Peter Mailer	1034	2.4
Keighley	Colin Carpenter	1470	2.9
Kettering	Arthur Smith	1551	2.7
Kilmarnock & Loudoun	William Sneddon	284	0.6
Kingston & Surbiton	Gail Tchiprout	1470	2.6
Kingston upon Hull East	Gordon Rogers	1788	4.4
Kingston upon Hull North	Norman Scott	1533	4.0
Kingston upon Hull West and Hessle	Richard Bate	1596	4.2
Kingswood	Alexandra Reather	1463	2.4
Kirkcaldy	Victor Baxter	413	1.2
Knowsley, S	Andrew Wright	954	2.0
Lancashire, W	Mike Carter	1025	1.9
Lancaster and Wyre	Vivien Ivell	1516	2.6
Leeds, Central	Philip Myers	1042	2.8
Leeds, E	Leon Parish	1267	3.5
Leeds, NE	Ian Rose	946	2.1
Leeds, NW	Sean Emmett	1325	2.7
Leeds, W	Bill Finley	1210	3.0
Leicester, E	Philip Iwaniw	1015	2.3
Leicester, S	John Hancock	1184	2.5
Leicester, W	William Shooter	970	2.4
Leicestershire, NW	Maurice Abney-Hastings	2088	4.0
Leigh	Roy Constable	1949	4.2
Leominster	Anthony Parkin	2815	5.6
Lewes	Lucille Butler	2481	5.1
Lewisham, Deptford	Shelagh Shepherd	868	2.6
Lewisham, E	Spencer Drury	910	2.4
Lewisham, W	Anthony Leese	1098	2.9
Lichfield	George Seward	1652	3.4
Lincoln	John Ivory	1329	2.9
Linlithgow	Kenneth Plomer	259	0.7
Liverpool, Garston	Frank Dunne	833	1.9
Liverpool, Riverside	George Skelly	586	1.5
Liverpool, Walton	Charles Grundy	620	1.5
Liverpool, Wavertree	Peter Worthington	576	1.3
Liverpool, West Derby	Peter Forrest	657	1.6
Livingston	Helen Campbell	444	1.0
Loughborough	Rama Gupta	991	1.9
Luton, S	Clive Jacobs	1205	2.5
Maidenhead	Charles Taverner	1638	3.2
Maidstone and the Weald	Sarah Hopkins	1998	3.7
Makerfield	Andrew Seed	1210	2.7
Manchester, Blackley	Paul Stanyer	1323	3.7
Manchester, Central	Bill Maxwell	742	2.2
Manchester, Gorton	Kevin Hartley	812	2.2
Manchester, Withington	Mark Sheppard	1079	2.5
Mansfield	Jim Bogusz	1588	3.4
Medway	Joseph Main	1420	3.2
Meirionnydd Nant Conwy	Phillip Hodge	809	3.3
Meriden	Paul Gilbert	2208	4.0
Merthyr Tydfil & Rhymney	Ron Hutchings	660	1.7
Middlesbrough	Bob Edwards	1331	2.9
Middlesbrough, S & East Cleveland	Robin Batchelor	1552	2.9
Midlothian	Keith Docking	320	0.9
Milton Keynes, NE	Michael Phillips	1492	2.9
Mitcham & Morden	Peter Isaacs	810	1.7
Mole Valley	Nick Taber	2424	4.5
Monmouth	Niall Warry	1190	2.4
Montgomeryshire	John Bufton	879	2.8
Moray	Paddy Mieklejohn	840	2.1
Morecambe & Lunesdale	Ian Ogilvie	1313	2.7
Morley & Rothwell	David Mitchell-Innes	1359	3.0
Motherwell & Wishaw	Thomas Russell	218	0.6
Neath	Peter Morris	975	2.4
New Forest, W	Maureen Elliott	2150	4.3
Newark	Graham Creedy	2035	3.9
Newbury	Ted Snook	992	1.8
Newcastle-under-Lyme	Kim Suttle	1510	3.1
Newcastle upon Tyne, Central	Charles Coxon	1113	2.4
Newcastle upon Tyne, E & Wallsend	Peter Cossins	966	2.3
Newcastle upon Tyne, N	Doreen Chipchase	1733	3.8
Newport, E	Garth Chaney-Davis	1267	3.4
Newport, W	Colin Thompsett	1199	3.0
Norfolk, Mid	Nigel Holder	3229	5.6
Norfolk, N	John Allen	2458	4.2
Norfolk, NW	Roger Percival	2923	5.1
Norfolk, S	Patricia Bateson	2533	4.1
Norfolk, SW	Ronnie Hoare	3694	6.3
Normanton	Ken Shuttleworth	1458	3.4
Northampton, S	Christopher Petrie	1405	2.5
Northavon	John Parfitt	1900	3.0
Norwich, N	Tony Bailey-Smith	1777	3.2
Norwich, S	David Holdsworth	1464	2.9
Nottingham, E	Ben Brown	1645	4.1
Nottingham, N	Joe Neal	1858	4.5
Nottingham, S	Ken Thompson	1523	3.1
Nuneaton	Roy English	1533	2.9
Ochil	Derek White	210	0.5
Old Bexley & Sidcup	Brian Reading	2457	4.8
Oldham, E & Saddleworth	Douglas Findlay	1116	2.1
Oldham, W & Royton	Peter Etherden	1157	2.5
Orkney & Shetland	Francis Adamson	820	4.0
Orpington	David Clark	2316	3.9
Oxford, E	Martin Young	1391	2.9
Oxford, W & Abingdon	Gillian Eustace	1258	2.1
Paisley, N	Edwin Mathew	196	0.6
Paisley, S	James Lardner	254	0.7
Pendle	Damian Hockney	2281	4.9
Penrith & The Border	Charles Pope	2018	4.1
Perth	Robert MacAuley	366	0.8
Peterborough	Philip Slater	924	1.9
Plymouth, Devonport	Clive Norsworthy	1486	2.9
Plymouth, Sutton	Tim Hanbury	1654	3.5
Pontefract & Castleford	Richard Wood	1401	3.4
Pontypridd	John Wood	874	1.9
Poole	John Riddington	1932	4.1
Poplar & Canning Town	Ian Hare	1091	2.8
Portsmouth, N	Shaun Evelegh	1757	3.9
Portsmouth, S	Christopher Trim	1629	3.2
Preseli Pembrokeshire	David Berry	1574	3.7
Preston	John Porter	924	1.9
Pudsey	David Crabtree	823	1.6
Putney	James Goldsmith	1518	3.5
Reading, E	David Harmer	1042	2.0
Reading, W	Steven Brown	976	2.0
Redditch	Richard Cox	1151	2.6
Regent's Park & Kensington, N	Sandra Dangoor	867	1.8
Reigate	George Gardiner	3352	7.0
Renfrewshire West	Shaw Lindsay	283	0.8
Rhondda	Stephen Gardener	658	1.6
Ribble Valley	Julian Parkinson	1297	2.3
Richmond (Yorkshire)	Alex Bentley	2367	5.0
Richmond Park	Jake Pugh	1467	2.6
Romford	Stephen Ward	1431	3.4
Romsey	Michael Wigley	1291	2.5
Ross, Skye & Inverness, W	Les Durance	535	1.3
Rossendale & Darwen	Roy Newstead	1108	2.2
Rother Valley	Stephen Cook	1932	4.2
Rotherham	Ray Hollebone	1132	3.0
Roxburgh & Berwickshire	John Curtis	922	2.6
Runnymede & Weybridge	Peter Rolt	2150	4.2
Rushcliffe	Sally Chadd	2682	4.3
Rutland & Melton	Rupert King	2317	4.4
Ryedale	John Mackfall	1460	3.0
Saffron Walden	Richard Glover	2308	4.1
Salford	Robert Cumpsty	926	2.8
Scarborough & Whitby	Shelagh Murray	2191	4.0
Scunthorpe	Paul Smith	1637	3.9
Sedgefield	Miriam Hall	1683	3.6
Selby	David Walker	1162	2.1
Sevenoaks	Nigel Large	2138	4.3
Sheffield, Attercliffe	James Brown	1289	2.9
Sheffield, Brightside	Brian Farnsworth	624	1.8
Sheffield, Central	Anthony Brownlow	863	2.4
Sheffield, Hallam	Ian Davidson	788	1.7
Sheffield, Heeley	David Mawson	1029	2.4
Sheffield, Hillsborough	John Rusling	1468	2.8
Sherwood	Lee Slack	1882	3.3
Shipley	Stephen Ellams	1960	3.7
Shrewsbury & Atcham	Dylan Barker	1346	2.4
Shropshire, N	Denis Allen	1764	3.4
Sittingbourne & Sheppey	Peter Moull	1082	2.3
Skipton & Ripon	Nancy Holdsworth	3212	5.9
Sleaford & North Hykeham	Peter Clery	2942	5.5
Slough	Terence Sharkey	1124	2.4
Solihull	Michael Nattrass	2748	4.7
Somerton & Frome	Robert Rodwell	2449	4.3
South Ribble	Mark Adams	1475	2.7
South Shields	Alan Loraine	1660	4.3
Southampton, Itchen	John Clegg	1660	3.4
Southampton, Test	Peter Day	1397	2.7
Southend, W	Charles Webster	1734	3.7
Southport	Frank Buckle	1368	2.7
Southwark, N & Bermondsey	Bill Newton	543	1.3
Spelthorne	Barney Coleman	1495	2.9
St. Albans	Jim Warrilow	1619	3.2
St. Helens, N	David Johnson	1276	2.6
St. Helens, S	William Holdaway	1165	2.6
St. Ives	Michael Faulkner	3714	6.9
Stafford	Stephen Culley	1146	2.2
Staffordshire, Moorlands	David Stanworth	1603	3.1
Staffordshire, S	Peter Carnell	2002	3.9
Stalybridge and Hyde	Robert Clapham	1992	4.6
Stevenage	Jeffrey Coburn	1194	2.3
Stockport	William Morley-Scott	1280	2.7
Stockton, N	Kevin McConnell	1563	3.5
Stockton, S	John Horner	1400	2.7
Stoke-on-Trent, Central	Peter Stanyer	1071	2.7
Stoke-on-Trent, N	Jennefer Tobin	1537	4.0
Stoke-on-Trent, S	Richard Adams	1103	2.4
Stourbridge	Peter Quick	1319	2.7
Stratford-on-Avon	Adrian Hilton	2064	3.3
Strathkelvin & Bearsden	David Wilson	339	0.7
Streatham	Jeremy Wall	864	1.9
Stretford & Urmston	Caroline Dore	1397	2.9
Suffolk, Coastal	Stephen Caulfield	3416	6.7
Suffolk, S	Somerset Chair	2740	5.3
Suffolk, W	James Carver	3724	7.6
Sunderland, N	Mark Nicholson	1394	3.7
Surrey, E	Michael Sydney	2656	4.9
Surrey, Heath	John Gale	2385	4.4
Surrey, SW	Judith Clementson	2830	5.0
Sussex, Mid	Tam Large	3146	5.9
Sutton & Cheam	Peter Atkinson	1784	3.8
Sutton Coldfield	Douglas Hope	2401	4.6
Swansea, E	Catherine Maggs	904	2.3
Swindon, N	Gillian Goldsmith	1533	3.2
Swindon, S	David Mackintosh	1273	2.5
Tamworth	Dianne Livesey	1163	2.3
Taunton	Brian Ahern	2760	4.5
Telford	Christopher Morris	1119	3.0
Thanet, N	Marcus Chambers	2535	5.2
Tiverton	Sam Lowings	2952	5.0
Tonbridge & Malling	John Scrivenor	2005	4.1
Tooting	Angela Husband	829	1.8
Torfaen	Deborah Holler	1245	2.9
Totnes	Pamela Cook	2552	4.8
Truro & St Austell	Carl Hearn	3682	6.5
Tunbridge Wells	Tim Macpherson	1858	3.8
Tweeddale, Ettrick &Lauderdale	Christopher Mowbray	406	4.0
Tyne Bridge	Graeme Oswald	919	2.6
Tynemouth	Clive Rook	819	1.6
Tyneside, N	Michael Rollings	1382	3.1
Upminster	Terry Murray	2000	4.9
Uxbridge	Garrick Aird	1153	2.8
Vale of Clwyd	Simon Vickers	834	2.1
Vale of York	Clive Fairclough	2503	4.7
Wakefield	Simon Shires	1480	2.9
Wallasey	Roger Hayes	1490	3.2
Walsall, N	Derek Bennett	1430	3.3
Walsall, S	Thomas Dent	1662	3.8
Walthamstow	George Hargreaves	1139	2.8
Wansbeck	Peter Gompertz	1146	2.5
Wansdyke	Kevin Clinton	1327	2.4
Wantage	Stuart Rising	1549	2.8
Warley	Krishna Gamre	941	2.4
Warrington, N	Arthur Smith	1816	3.5
Warrington, S	Gerald Kelly	1082	2.0
Warwick & Leamington	Val Davis	1484	2.5
Warwickshire, N	Ron Mole	917	1.7
Watford	Philip Roe	1484	2.7
Wealden	Barry Taplin	3527	6.0
Weaver Vale	Roger Cockfield	1312	2.7
Wells	Patricia Phelps	2196	3.9
Wentworth	Andrew Battley	1423	3.4
West Bromwich, E	Graham Mulley	1472	3.6
Westbury	Nick Hawkings-Byass	1909	3.4
West Chelmsford	Terence Smith	1536	2.6
Western Isles	Ralph Lionel	206	1.3
Westmorland & Lonsdale	Michael Smith	1924	3.8
Weston-super-Mare	Tom Sewell	2280	4.3
Wigan	Anthony Bradborn	1450	3.3
Wiltshire, N	Margaret Purves	1774	3.1
Wimbledon	Hammed Abid	993	2.1
Winchester	Peter Strand	1598	2.6
Windsor	James McDermott	1676	3.3
Wirral, S	Donald Wilcox	768	1.6
Wirral, W	Derek Wharton	1613	3.4
Witney	Geoffrey Brown	2262	4.0
Woking	Christopher Skeate	2209	4.3
Wolverhampton, NE	Andrew Muchall	1192	2.9
Wolverhampton, SE	Trevor Stevenson-Platt	980	2.8
Woodspring	Richard Hughes	1641	3.0
Worcestershire, Mid	Terence Watson	1780	3.5
Workington	George Donnan	1412	2.9
Worthing, E & Shoreham	James McCulloch	1683	3.3
Worthing, W	Nicholas John	2313	4.5
Wrexham	John Cronk	1195	3.3
Wycombe	Alan Fulford	2394	4.6
Wyre Forest	William Till	1956	3.6
Wythenshawe & Sale East	Brian Stanyer	1060	2.3
Yeovil	John Beveridge	3574	6.6
Ynys Môn	Hugh Gray Morris	793	2.0
York	Jonathan Sheppard	1083	1.9

== By-election: 25 November 1999 ==
Constituency	Candidate	Votes	%
Kensington & Chelsea	Stephen Scott-Fawcett	57	0.3

== See also ==
- UK Independence Party election results
