= Sotheron =

Sotheron is a surname. Notable people by that name include:

- T. H. S. Sotheron-Estcourt (1801–1876), British Conservative politician
- George Sotheron-Estcourt, 1st Baron Estcourt (1839–1915), British Conservative Party politician.
- Frank Sotheron (1765–1839), member of Parliament for Nottinghamshire.
- Thomas E. Sotheron-Estcourt (1881–1958), British Army officer and Conservative Member of Parliament.
- John de Sotheron (died after 1398), English landowner, lawyer and judge, who was Lord Chief Justice of Ireland.

== See also ==
- Estcourt (surname)
