= Richard Penruddocke Long =

English landowner and Conservative Party politician

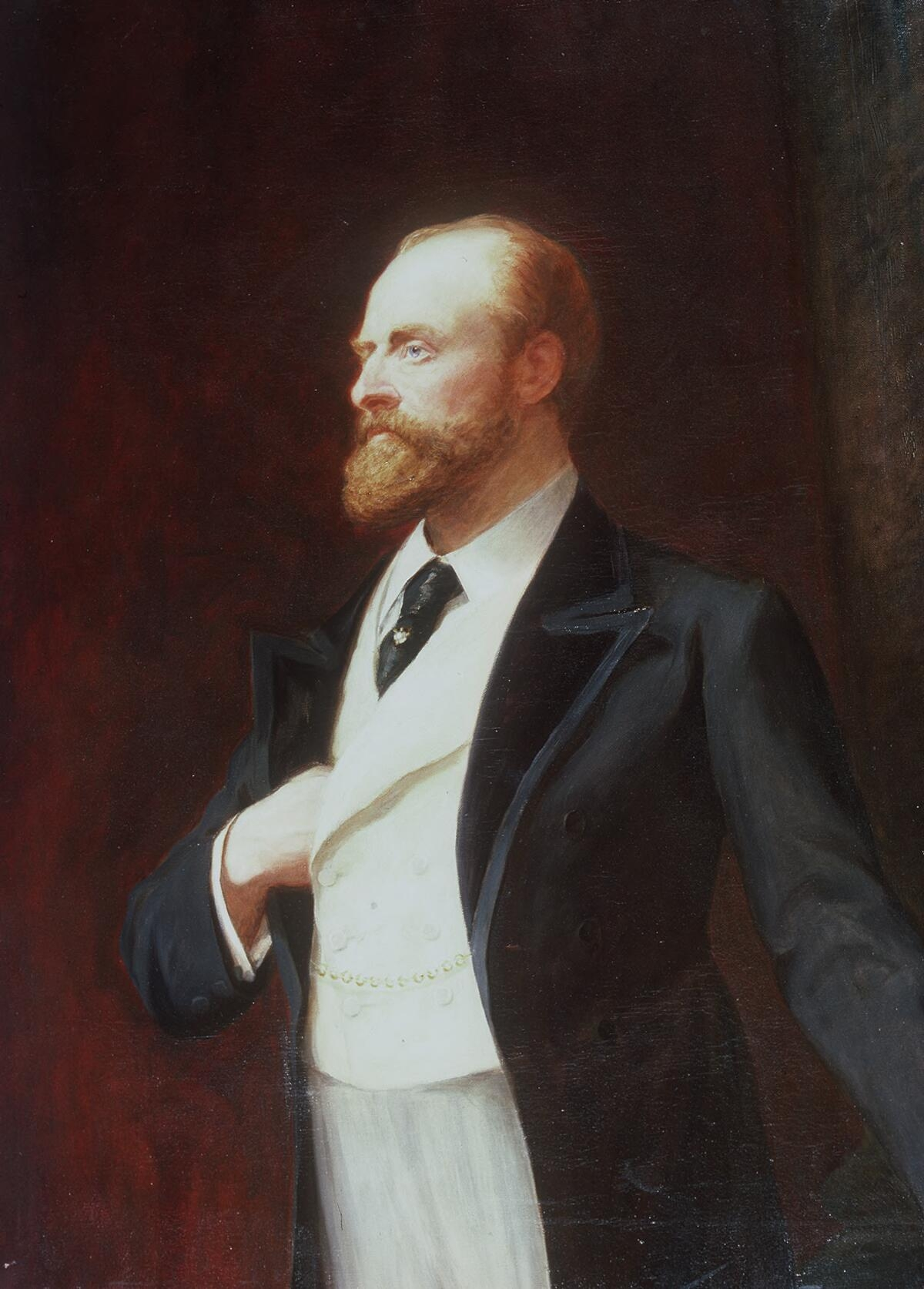

Richard Penruddocke Long JP, DL (19 December 1825 – 16 February 1875) was an English landowner and Conservative Party politician. He was a founding member of the amateur cricket club I Zingari. Long was appointed High Sheriff of Montgomeryshire in 1858 and served as Justice of the Peace as well as Deputy Lieutenant for the county.

== Early life ==
Born at Baynton House in East Coulston, Wiltshire, he was the second son of Walter Long and his first wife Mary Anne, daughter of Archibald Colquhoun. He was baptised in Rood Ashton on 4 July 1827. Long was educated at Harrow School and went then to Trinity College, Cambridge, where he graduated as a Bachelor of Arts in 1848 and was promoted to Master of Arts four years later. Long joined the Royal Wiltshire Yeomanry, which his grandfather had helped to establish, and became a captain in 1848. He first appeared in first-class cricket at Cambridge and played 11 first-class matches in all over the next few years.

In 1846 his elder brother Walter married 21-year-old Harriet Avarina Brunetta Herbert, only daughter and heiress of Captain Owen Herbert, of Dolforgan Hall, Montgomeryshire. Harriet died the following year as a result of complications during childbirth, and Walter died three months later, some say of a broken heart. These events eventually led to Long inheriting his father's estates in 1867, including South Wraxall Manor, Rood Ashton House and Southwick Court in Wiltshire, and Dolforgan Hall in Montgomeryshire.

== Career ==
Long's relationship with his father was at times strained, with disagreements over money and property, and what Long saw as his father's refusal to help him establish his political career, having contested South Wiltshire unsuccessfully in 1852. When he married in the following year, he and his wife Charlotte went to live at Dolforgan. He was worried about the increasing encumbrances placed on the estates by his father, who he believed was manipulating sales of portions of the settled estates to his future disadvantage. His mother died in 1856, and his father remarried a year later, which caused even more acrimony between the two.

Due to his increasing anxiety over the state of his finances, he was considering the possibility his family would be forced to live cheaply on the Continent to save sufficient money to service the outstanding debts on the Montgomeryshire estates. He suffered ongoing health problems, and in 1856 he had been injured in a shooting accident, which resulted in the loss of his right eye. Three years later, in 1859, Long entered the British House of Commons, sitting for Chippenham in the following time. He felt his income from the estates rental, and what he believed was an inadequate annual allowance from his father, were insufficient for him to live in a fitting style at Dolforgan Hall, carry out repairs and improvements on the estates in Montgomeryshire, and attend to his parliamentary duties, having been elected for North Wiltshire, the constituency his father had previously represented, in 1865.

In 1867 when Long succeeded to his father's estates, the family relocated to Rood Ashton. Rood Ashton House was built for his grandfather Richard Godolphin Long in 1808, replacing an earlier mansion. The estate was originally purchased by Edward Long of Monkton House in 1597 and passed down through the generations. Due to illness Long retired as Member of Parliament in 1868. His troubles continued on inheriting Rood Ashton, and he and his wife, with their younger children spent protracted residences abroad – in Switzerland and France – partly for health and partly for domestic financial reasons. Long was under pressure from his stepmother, the former Lady Mary Bisshopp, who believed she had not been adequately provided for under the terms of her late husband's will. He wrote to her expressing regret that he was unable to help her financially, due to the many demands made by delayed improvements to the estate and Rood Ashton House, and advised that she should curb her extravagant lifestyle. In 1871 to pay debts, he was forced to sell the greater part of the heavily encumbered Dolforgan estate for £76,500.

== Later years and death ==
Charlotte enjoyed a lavish lifestyle, often travelling to Cannes, France, her favourite watering place with a private coupe on the train, eating off her own silver and eggshell china, and surrounded by a suite of couriers, valets de chambre and maids.

In 1872, after Emperor Napoleon III lost the Battle of Sedan, and with it his throne, he and the Empress Eugenie fled to England. Charlotte was known to bear a resemblance to the Empress. One day when Charlotte was travelling in her usual style to the South of France, someone spotted her and mistakenly believed that the Empress was aboard the train. The word got around and a bouquet of flowers was thrown through the open window of Charlotte's compartment with a note: "We implore your Majesty to return to us". No doubt in French of course.

Long died, aged 49 in Cannes and was buried in West Ashton on 3 March 1875. After his death, Charlotte moved to Dolforgan Court in Exmouth, Devon, and became known locally as "Lady Bountiful" for her charitable works and her role in founding a hospital. However, her husband's cousin, who was manager of the family estates, feared that she would ruin the estates as well as her son Walter's reputation and the family name, through her "unthinking extravagance" and long-standing propensity for running up debts. In 1878 the family was forced to make legal arrangements to curb her spending.

== Family and legacy ==
On 4 October 1853, Long had married Charlotte Anna, fourth and only surviving daughter of the politician William Wentworth Fitzwilliam Hume of Humewood in the Irish County Wicklow, in St George's, Hanover Square in London. They had ten children, of which the two youngest were born in France. His five-year-old son Henry died in 1866 from diphtheria, which almost claimed the life of his wife.

The oldest son Walter became a cabinet minister and was later raised to the peerage as Viscount Long. His second son Richard sat also in the Parliament of the United Kingdom and was ennobled with the title Baron Gisborough. Florence Frideswyde (1855–1941), his eldest daughter, was married to Sir Arthur Fairbairn, 3rd Baronet, grandson of Sir William Fairbairn, and the next younger daughter Margaret Henrietta Georgina (1859–1914) was married to Colonel Hugh Frank Clutterbuck. Another daughter named Frances Laura Arabella (1864–1932) was first the wife of the explorer Harry Willes de Windt, and secondly of the engineer Anthony George Lyster. Long's other children were:

- Robert Chaloner Critchley Long (4 September 1858 – 5 October 1938), married Maud Felicia Frances Ann Pugh-Johnson (d. 1916), youngest daughter of Captain Willes Johnson and his third wife (Note: She was Margaret Anne Pugh, later Mrs. Pugh-Johnson from 2 February 1879, and eldest daughter of Major David Pugh, of Llanerchydol Hall, near Welshpool, and Rhiwargor, co. Montgomery, sometime MP, DL, and High Sheriff for Montgomeryshire, by his wife, Anne, only child and heiress of Evan Vaughan, Esq., of Beguildy, co. Radnor.) on 6 February 1884
- Charlotte Ethel Long (1861–1936), married John Evan Hamilton Martin on 31 January 1889
- Henry Hope Giffard Long (1862–1866)
- Maud Avarina Millesaintes Long (1867–1880)
- Colonel William Hoare Bourchier Long (1868–1943), married Vera Cecily Marchant Oliver on 25 November 1911

== Bibliography ==
- Kendle, John (1992). Walter Long, Ireland and the Union, 1905–1920. McGill-Queen's Press. ISBN 0-7735-0908-9.
- Papers of Viscount Long, Ref no. 947. Swindon: Wiltshire Records Office. 1992.

Parliament of the United Kingdom
Preceded by Robert Parry Nisbet; Henry George Boldero	Member of Parliament for Chippenham; 1859–1865; With: William John Lysley	Succeeded by Sir John Neeld, Bt; Gabriel Goldney
Preceded by Walter Long; Lord Charles Bruce	Member of Parliament for North Wiltshire; 1865–1868; With: Lord Charles Bruce	Succeeded by Lord Charles Bruce; Sir George Jenkinson
