= James Gray (British politician) =

British politician

James Gray CStJ
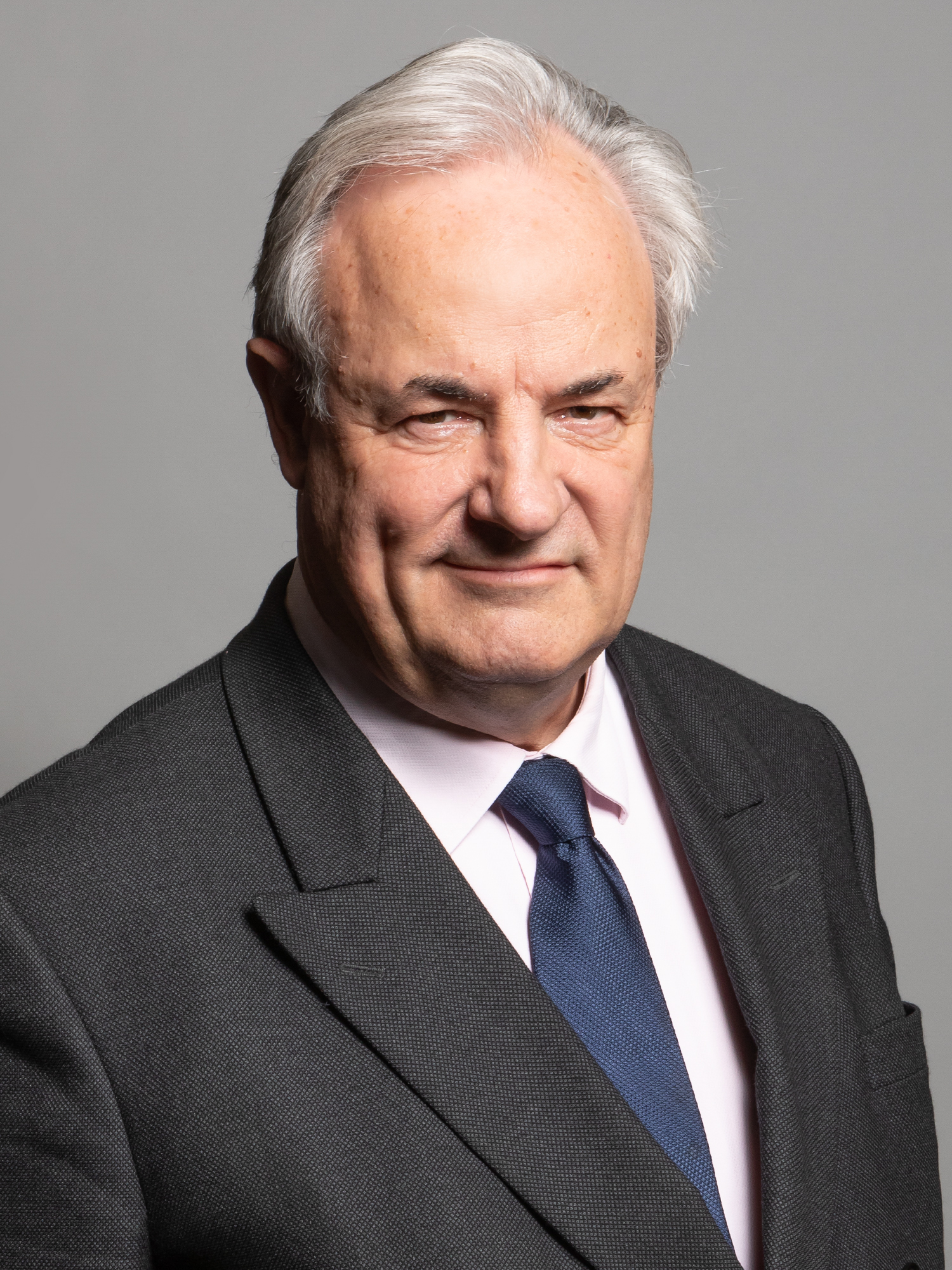
- Official portrait, 2020

Member of Parliament for North Wiltshire
- In office 1 May 1997 – 30 May 2024
- Preceded by: Richard Needham
- Succeeded by: Constituency abolished

Shadow Secretary of State for Scotland
- In office 9 May 2005 – 12 May 2005
- Leader: Michael Howard
- Preceded by: Peter Duncan
- Succeeded by: Eleanor Laing

Personal details
- Born: 7 November 1954 (age 71) Glasgow, Scotland
- Party: Conservative
- Education: University of Glasgow; Christ Church, Oxford

James Gray, CStJ (born 7 November 1954) is a British politician who served as the Conservative Member of Parliament (MP) for North Wiltshire from 1997 to 2024.

== Early life ==
Born in Glasgow, Gray is the eldest son of Very Rev Dr John Rodger Gray, Minister of Dunblane Cathedral and the 1977 Moderator of the General Assembly of the Church of Scotland, and Dr Sheila Mary Gray (née Whiteside), a GP.

Gray was educated at the Hillhead Primary School, Glasgow, and then the High School of Glasgow, a private school. He studied history at the University of Glasgow, where he graduated with an undergraduate Master of Arts (MA Hons) degree in 1975. He then undertook post-graduate studies at Christ Church, Oxford, where he completed a history thesis in 1977.

== Early career ==
From 1977, Gray worked as a graduate management trainee with P&O for a year, also joining the Honourable Artillery Company, a unit of the Territorial Army based in Islington, where he served for seven years, becoming a graduate of the Royal College of Defence Studies with the Armed Forces Parliamentary Scheme. Gray was then engaged as a ship broker with Anderson Hughes before being admitted to the Freedom of the City of London in 1978, since when he has been a member of the Baltic Exchange. Managing director of GNI Freight Futures from 1984 until 1992, he was also a director of the Baltic Futures Exchange from 1989 to 1991. In 1987 he was awarded the Lloyd's of London Book Prize.

=== Entering politics ===
Grey stood unsuccessfully against Charles Kennedy in the seat of Ross, Cromarty and Skye at the 1992 general election. He later became a special advisor to the Secretary of State for the Environment, Michael Howard, and to his successor John Gummer. His particular responsibility was to the Ministers of State for Housing, Local Government and the Environment from 1992 until 1995, when he became a director of the public affairs consultancy Westminster Strategy. Gray also served as governor of two schools in Balham and in the London Borough of Wandsworth. In 1994, he was elected as vice-chairman of Tooting Conservative Association, serving for two years.

== Member of Parliament ==
At the 1997 general election, Gray was elected to the House of Commons as Member for the North Wiltshire constituency, following the retirement of the former Conservative Member, the Earl of Kilmorey. Gray won the seat with a majority of 3,475.

Gray made his maiden speech on 11 June 1997, in which he spoke of his constituency's largest town of Chippenham, and of his sadness at the massacre in his childhood home town of Dunblane.

His shadow ministerial career began with his appointment as a Conservative Whip in October 2000 and then as a Shadow Minister for Defence in 2001. He served as Shadow Minister for the Countryside from 2002 to 2005. After the 2005 general election, he served for just one week as Shadow Secretary of State for Scotland, as Peter Duncan had lost his seat. Gray resigned after stating that the Scottish Parliament should be abolished and replaced with Scottish MPs travelling to Edinburgh to conduct devolved business. He was replaced by Eleanor Laing, similarly a Scottish MP representing an English constituency.

Gray has served on a variety of Parliamentary select committees He sat on the Environment, Transport and Regional Affairs Committee from 1997 to 2001. He served from 2001 to 2003 on the Broadcasting Committee. He was a member of the Environment, Food and Rural Affairs Committee for the 2005 Parliament, and Chairman of the Conservative Rural Action Group (2002–2005).

Gray founded the All Party Group for the Army in 2004 and was the sitting MP on David Cameron's policy group for National and International Security, chaired by Dame Pauline Neville-Jones (2006–07). The Group published their report, An Unquiet World in July 2007.

In March 2009, Gray was a member of a cross-party parliamentary delegation to Afghanistan to learn about British Army operations there. During the visit, British service personnel demonstrated the process by which wounded soldiers are flown into Kandahar on a Hercules and transferred across the runway to a C-17 equipped with the latest medical equipment, and were photographed with medical staff on board. Gray denied allegations that he had taken photographs of a "dying soldier" posted on the blog of Iain Dale, stating that after a reminder to delete any images including injured servicemen, he had checked his camera and found none. According to Gray it was night time and the delegation was kept 500 yards away from the injured soldiers. Following the publication of two articles in The Sun and Daily Mail, the incident was investigated by the Press Complaints Commission and Gray's complaints were upheld.

At the 2010 General Election, Gray had stood in the constituency of North Wiltshire: he won by a majority of 7,483 votes, winning 25,114 votes and securing 51.6% of the 48,699 who voted. The number of votes he received had risen by 1.9% since the last election, whilst support for the Labour Party had fallen by 5.3% in his constituency.

In the 2010 Parliament he sat on the Procedure Committee, Panel of Chairs and until 2013 the Finance and Services Committee. From 2013 onwards he sat on the Defence Committee and Committees on Arms Export Controls. In May 2014 he was one of seven unsuccessful candidates for the chairmanship of the House of Commons Defence Select Committee.

In the previous parliament he served as the Chairman of the All-Party Group for Multiple Sclerosis. He was Treasurer of the APPG for Suicide Prevention, a vice-chairman of the APPG on Agriculture and Food for Development and a founder and member of the APPGs for Historic Churches and Dairy Farmers. He was also a member of the all-party groups for Financial Markets and Services, Middle Way (hunting and animal welfare), Minerals, Racing and Bloodstock Industries and Solvent Abuse. Gray's stated countries of interest are America, China, Mongolia, Nepal, Sri Lanka and Russia.

Gray has signed several early day motions, sponsored by Conservative MP David Tredinnick, in support of the continued funding of homeopathy on the NHS.

Gray campaigned against the closure of RAF Lyneham. In January, he hosted a special 1½ hour Westminster Hall debate on the subject of 'The RAF Air Transport Fleet and RAF Lyneham'. Following the debate, Gray published a dossier on a number of significant changes in the Air Transport Fleet which should, according to Gray, result in the decision to close RAF Lyneham being reversed.

In a House of Commons debate on 9 December 2010, Thomas Docherty, the Labour Member of Parliament for Dunfermline and West Fife accused Gray of directing a "racist remark" towards Willie Bain. Gray was alleged to have told McBain to "get back to Jockland". Gray responded: "I cannot imagine what sedentary remark the hon. Gentleman may have heard, but I am certain that had it been out of order in any shape, size or form, Mr Speaker, who was then in the chair, would have picked me up on it. Further to that, as a Scot born, bred and educated, who never left the borders of Scotland until the age of 21, I think that unlike [Thomas Docherty], I have the highest respect and love for my native heath. I would never say a single word against it."

In March 2019, Gray was one of 21 MPs who voted against LGBT inclusive sex and relationship education in English schools. A keen Brexit supporter, he was an advocate for pro-Brexit lobby group Leave Means Leave.

In September 2021, he issued an apology after joking that a bomb should be delivered to the office of Labour Party chairwoman Anneliese Dodds. Gray said: "It was a foolish remark. I meant no offence and hope none was taken." In October 2021, he was criticised after confusing Education Secretary Nadhim Zahawi and Health Secretary Sajid Javid at a reception in Parliament, allegedly saying "they all look the same to me." Gray acknowledged that he mixed up the names of the two ministers but denied saying "they all look the same to me".

At the 2024 General Election, Gray stood in the newly created constituency of South Cotswolds: he was defeated by a margin of 4,973 votes to the Liberal Democrat candidate, Roz Savage.

=== Expenses ===
In May 2009, Gray's expenses were highlighted in the media when he was accused of claiming for Remembrance Day wreaths. It was claimed that his action had angered Forces charity groups. It was reported that Gray then complained to the Leader of the House of Commons when he was told that Remembrance Day wreaths were not a legitimate expense. These claims were denied by Gray who argued that Military and Council representatives do not pay for wreaths out of their own pockets. Details of Gray's expenses, published by House of Commons Authorities, show that he was never reimbursed for the cost of Remembrance Sunday wreaths. Gray was later criticised for claiming £2,000 decorating fees for a second home on the day he moved out. Gray organised three special surgeries in Corsham, Wootton Bassett and Malmesbury to answer any questions from his constituents regarding his expenses.

== Post-parliamentary career ==
Following his defeat at the 2024 election, Gray had reached the official retirement age in the United Kingdom. In an interview with PoliticsHome, Gray told them he was spending his retirement "writing a book about the Arctic".

== Personal life ==
Gray married Sarah Ann Beale in 1980, and they have two sons and a daughter. The marriage ended in 2006, after it emerged that Gray was having an affair with a married woman, Philippa Mayo, while his wife was fighting breast cancer. Gray had met Philippa Mayo, then Director of the Countryside Alliance's pro-hunting campaign, while organising Conservative opposition to the anti-hunting bill. The affair attracted national press attention when Mayo's husband, the barrister Rupert Mayo, wrote to a local newspaper, the Wiltshire Gazette and Herald, "The irony is that I will not reap the benefits of Mr Cameron's excellent family-based policy proposals because one of his own MPs has ripped my own family apart." The local Conservative Association subsequently considered deselecting Gray as their parliamentary candidate, but in January 2007, after a secret ballot of all local party members, decided to confirm him as the Conservative candidate for North Wiltshire.

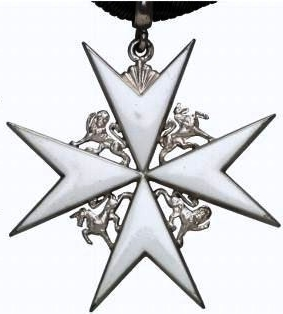
Neck badge of a Commander of the Order

== Honours and decorations ==
In August 2020, Gray was one of 11 appointments as Commander of the Order of St John: Gray said he looked forward to supporting the Order, in particular St John Ambulance.

== Publications ==
- Financial Risk Management in the Shipping Industry by James Gray, 1986 Fairplay Publications ISBN 0-905045-89-0
- Futures and Options for Shipping by James Gray, 1987, LLP Professional Publishing ISBN 1-85044-136-7
- Shipping Futures by James Gray, 1990, LLP Professional Publishing ISBN 1-85044-322-X
- Who Takes Britain to War? by James Gray MP and Mark Lomas QC, The history Group publishing ISBN 978-0-7509-6182-0
- Poles Apart by James Gray MP

Parliament of the United Kingdom
Preceded by Richard Needham	Member of Parliament for North Wiltshire; 1997–2024	Succeeded by Constituency abolished
Political offices
Preceded by Peter Duncan	Shadow Secretary of State for Scotland; 2005	Succeeded by Eleanor Laing
