= 1893 Liverpool West Derby by-election =

UK Parliamentary by-election

The 1893 Liverpool West Derby by-election was held on 10 January 1893 after the death of the incumbent Conservative MP William Henry Cross. It was retained by the Conservative candidate Walter Hume Long.

Liverpool West Derby by-election, 1893
| Party | Candidate | Votes | % | ±% |
|---|---|---|---|---|
| Conservative | Walter Hume Long | 3,632 | 61.5 | +3.1 |
| Liberal | D. Shilton Collin | 2,275 | 38.5 | −3.1 |
| Majority | | 1,357 | 23.0 | +6.2 |
| Turnout | | 5,907 | 58.5 | −12.0 |
| Conservative hold | | Swing | +3.1 | |
