= Walter Long, 1st Viscount Long =

British politician (1854–1924)

The Right Honourable The Viscount Long PC JP FRS
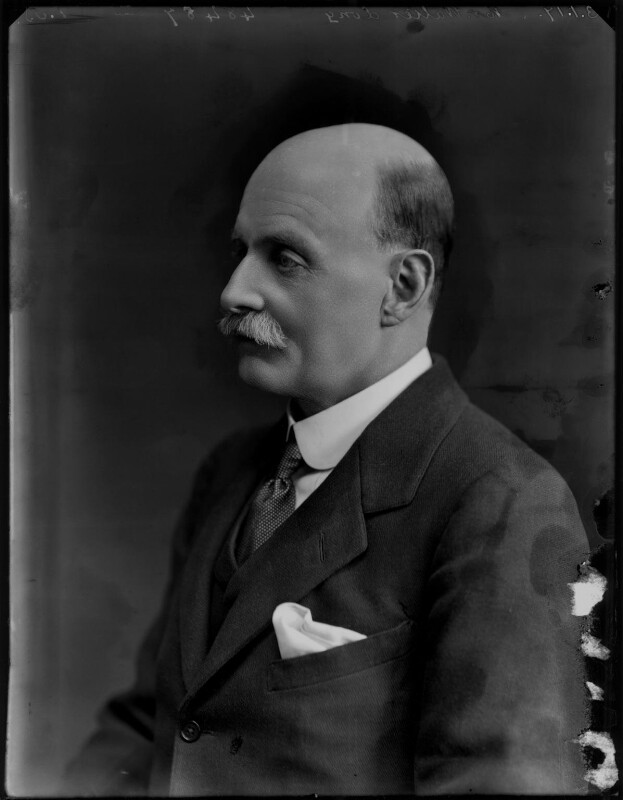
- Long in 1917

Secretary of State for the Colonies
- In office 10 December 1916 – 10 January 1919
- Monarch: George V
- Prime Minister: David Lloyd George
- Preceded by: Bonar Law
- Succeeded by: The Viscount Milner

First Lord of the Admiralty
- In office 10 January 1919 – 13 February 1921
- Monarch: George V
- Prime Minister: David Lloyd George
- Preceded by: Sir Eric Geddes
- Succeeded by: The Viscount Lee of Fareham

2nd Leader of the Ulster Unionist Party
- In office 1906–1910
- Preceded by: Edward James Saunderson
- Succeeded by: Sir Edward Carson

2nd Leader of the Irish Unionist Alliance
- In office 1906–1910
- Preceded by: Edward James Saunderson
- Succeeded by: Sir Edward Carson

Personal details
- Born: 13 July 1854 Bath, England
- Died: 26 September 1924 (aged 70) West Ashton, England
- Party: Conservative; Ulster Unionist
- Spouse: Dorothy Boyle (m. 1860)
- Children: 5, including Walter
- Parent(s): Richard Penruddocke Long; Charlotte Anna Dick
- Education: Christ Church, Oxford

Walter Hume Long, 1st Viscount Long, PC, JP, FRS (13 July 1854 – 26 September 1924), was a British Unionist politician. In a political career spanning over 40 years, he held office as President of the Board of Agriculture, President of the Local Government Board, Chief Secretary for Ireland, Secretary of State for the Colonies and First Lord of the Admiralty. He is also remembered for his links with Irish Unionism, and served as Leader of the Irish Unionist Party in the House of Commons from 1906 to 1910.

== Background and education ==
Long was born at Bath, the eldest son of Richard Penruddocke Long and his wife Charlotte Anna, daughter of William Wentworth FitzWilliam Dick (originally Hume). The 1st Baron Gisborough was Walter's younger brother. On his father's side he was descended from an old family of Wiltshire gentry, and on his mother's side from Anglo-Irish gentry in County Wicklow. When young, Walter lived at Dolforgan Hall, Montgomeryshire, a property owned by his grandfather. While living there, his father inherited the Rood Ashton estate.

Long went to Hilperton school, Amesbury, where he was harshly disciplined by Edwin Meyrick. At Harrow Walter was popular, proving a sporty captain of cricket. During Walter's studies at Christ Church, Oxford his father had a mental breakdown and died, two years later, in February 1875. Walter took over management of the family properties upon his father's death, whilst his mother moved into a house in Oxford. It was a stressful time, during which he was frequently summoned by his mother, and his younger brother also accumulated debts.

Long continued to box, ride, and hunt, as well as play college cricket. Afternoons spent with the Bicester, Heythrops, and South Oxfordshire hunts were matched by the university Drag Hunt. His proficiency was reflected in the early offer to become Master of the Vale of White Horse Hunt, which he turned down. His agent H. Medlicott despaired at the danger to the family fortune, urging him to cut his relations loose, but he raised a new £30,000 mortgage on lands, which Medlicott complained he would have to sell.

Long served as an officer in the Royal Wiltshire Yeomanry, and was promoted Major in 1890, becoming Lieutenant-Colonel in command from 1898 to 1906.

== Political career, 1880–1911 ==
Long was determined on a career in politics, campaigning at Marlborough in a traditional Liberal seat in 1879. After Sir George Jenkinson agreed to resign in North Wiltshire, he was adopted by 'half a dozen country gentlemen'. At the 1880 general election, Long was elected to parliament as a Conservative for the seat, which he held until 1885. A supporter of Lord Beaconsfield, the British Empire, Church of England and state, he was against extending education, but favoured bible teachings in schools. He won the two-member North Wiltshire seat by more than 2000 votes. At the time Beaconsfield died on 19 April 1881, he was making a record of his days in the Commons: "I rose somewhere about 8.30 and as a new member was duly called". The Liberal government was in trouble over Egypt and the Bradlaugh incident; and the Conservatives were internally divided. He hunted for the Beaufort Hounds.

I selected as my time, midnight until, if necessary, eight in the morning. I used to leave London at 5.30 in the morning, providing the House was up, take the train down to Chippenham, have my hunt, and get back to London by train leaving Chippenham about 7.30 … I was at the House at midnight and I would stay there till it rose.

He made his first speech on 26 July 1880 during the third reading of the Compensation for Disturbances (Ireland) bill.

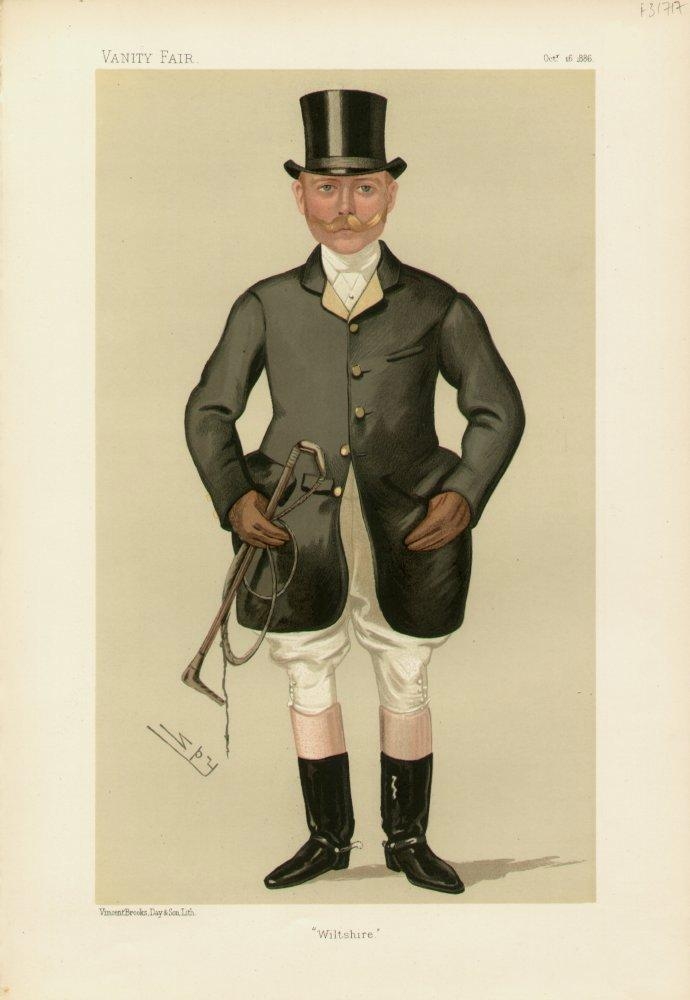
"Wiltshire" [the county of his Devizes constituency]. Caricature by Spy published in Vanity Fair in 1886.

With North Wiltshire abolished, Long won his Devizes seat with a reduced majority of 95 votes at the November 1885 general election. There was considerable anger at the Conservatives 'Fair Trade policy' for workers. He believed English people had little understanding of Ireland or the minority in Ireland that Home Rule would not protect, and that Gladstone's Home Rule policy would lead to the dismemberment of the empire. The home rule policy was defeated, Long was returned with an increased majority of 1726 votes in July 1886. Aged thirty-two, Long was asked to become a junior minister to Charles Ritchie at the Local Government Board, in Salisbury's government. They had noticed his unswerving support from the backbenches. He was approachable and had a no-nonsense manner, an excellent memory: logical and crisp. He was both mature and responsible for a young MP. The very strong connections he had with the agricultural community assisted local government in his area. He entered government for the first time in 1886 in Lord Salisbury's second administration as Parliamentary Secretary to the Local Government Board, serving under Charles Ritchie, and became one of the architects of the Local Government Act 1888, which established elected county councils. Long dealt with Poor Law reform in the county areas, slum reforms, reform of the London County Council, and better housing for the working-classes. He was deputed to make speeches backing the government position on the LCC bill, although he was not responsible for its draft or passage. Ritchie was to deal with the towns in Local Government Act 1888, but was ill for the period, and Long had "a sound grasp its details and essentials."

On 6 Feb 1887, he made an important speech in the "Plan of Campaign" from which unionism there seemed to encourage landlordism. However behind the law for tenant compensation, Long knew lay a deeper demand for independence. He continued to be worried by the Liberals' policy of Home Rule, supporting the Irish Unionists who opposed it.

He could not square the retention of Irish MPs at Westminster under the scheme for the second home rule bill. Irish MPs could control English, Scottish, and Welsh affairs, so he argued. The issue was central to the general election of 1892. Long had returned from Canada on a tour speaking on the federal system there. He reiterated the claim that Ulster Unionists would never accept the bill but Liberals argued that the Conservatives would raise bread prices, and lower wages if returned, "the labourers are ignorant lot and swallowed it whole", he decried. Long was defeated by 138 votes, losing his seat. In July 1892, Liverpool West Derby became vacant and Long defeated the Liberal candidate by 1357 votes at the by-election of 1893. Knowing his grasp of parliamentary procedure, Arthur Balfour hired him to be a strategist in opposition. The Liberals appointed Long to the Royal Commission on Agriculture, meeting at Trowbridge on 18 January 1893.

Long continued in connections with Ireland throughout his career. He did not wish to sever legislative ties of Union with Ireland; but only to offer "an extension of the privileges of local government to the Irish people". Home Rule was thrown out by the Lords on 8 September 1893, by 419 votes to 41. In June 1895, the Liberals were resoundingly defeated in the Lords, and the following month Salisbury was returned for another ministry.

After the Conservative defeat in 1892, Ritchie's retirement made Long the chief opposition spokesman on local government, and when the Tories returned to power in 1895, he entered the cabinet as President of the Board of Agriculture. In this role he was notable for his efforts to prevent the spread of rabies. The creation of the Board of Agriculture had brought a boost to Long's career in 1889 but opposition rose up strongly, when the Dog Muzzlers act, prompted the Laymen's League in Liverpool to contest the Church Discipline bill. Long became increasingly unpopular in his constituency accused of being "irascible and scheming", and was advised to change seats. However, this did not prevent in 1895 admittance to the Privy Council. The bourgeois Navy League in Liverpool could not wait to get rid of him but his powerful friends, like the "somnolent" Duke of Devonshire gave large donations to the Anti-Socialist Union – and this would be disastrous to the Union, for it would immediately alienate every snob and mediocrity ..." Yet Long was thick-skinned and seemed impervious to the insults, for he remained remarkably successful at the polls.

At the 'Khaki election' of November 1900, Long won Bristol South. With the ministerial shuffle in 1900, he became President of the Local Government Board (Long would return to that position in 1915). Never an insider, Long worked closely with constituents on local issues showing "sensitivity to the wider needs of society". His capacity for hard work revealed that he was also stubborn, short-tempered, with a choleric temperament; a stickler for the letter of the law. He was frequently plagued by ill-health: neuralgia, arthritis, susceptible to colds and flu; a waspish character, he was not charismatic, nor was he analytic or probing, like his mentor Arthur Balfour.

In 1903, Long took a leading role as a spokesman for the protectionist wing of the party, advocating tariff reform and imperial preference alongside Joseph Chamberlain and his son Austen Chamberlain, which brought him into conflict with Charles Ritchie, Michael Hicks-Beach and others on the free-trade wing.

Long was a moderate within the protectionist ranks and became a go-between for the protectionists and free-traders, increasing his prominence and popularity within the party. Perhaps his most significant achievement on the board was the unification of the London water-supply boards into the Metropolitan Water Board.

=== Chief Secretary for Ireland ===
Long was offered the position of First Lord of the Admiralty in Lord Selborne's place, as the latter was appointed to the Governor-Generalship of South Africa but he refused the promotion, advising the appointment of Lord Cawdor. Long really wanted to remain at Local Government, but when George Wyndham resigned as Chief Secretary for Ireland, Balfour was faced with a crisis. Wyndham resigned on 5 March 1905, over what became known as the "Wyndham-MacDonnell Imbroglio". Sir Antony MacDonnell was a successful Indian civil servant appointed by Wyndham as Permanent Under-Secretary to the Lord Lieutenant of Ireland on the strict understanding that the permanent post made MacDonnell's role a non-political position. MacDonnell was a Catholic from County Mayo, whose appointment left unionists wondering if they had been betrayed by London. Nevertheless, having competently implemented the Land Purchase (Ireland) Act 1903, MacDonnell came to be seen as a force for moderation. Wyndham was occupied in London with cabinet duties and so appreciated the implied need for permanent governance.

Balfour had already considered Long for the post in January 1905, and to that end consulted both Edward Carson and John Atkinson, under pressure from Horace Plunkett and Gerald Balfour to continue the policy of moderate reform. Due to his Irish connections (both his wife and his mother were Irish), Balfour hoped that Long might be more acceptable to Irish Unionists than his predecessor. Long was reluctant to accept the offer, being frustrated and angered by Lord Dunraven's proposals and MacDonnell's initiatives, which he regarded as anti-Unionist. However, Long was determined to bring Unionism back from the brink of extinction in Ireland.

Arriving in Dublin on 15 March, at dinner there he took the pragmatic view to work with MacDonnell. Throughout March and April he saw no grounds for MacDonnell's dismissal. Long's motto of "patience and firmness" was designed to placate Irish Unionists at public meetings, speeches and tours of Ireland, made to reassure local community officials. While labouring closely with Unionists to discuss agrarian and non-agrarian crime, and discipline in the RIC, he continued to appease Unionist opinion. He appointed Unionist William Moore as Solicitor-General for Ireland, and saw to the appointment of John Atkinson, as a Lord of Appeal, while Edward Saunderson, an Ulsterite member of the Orange Order, became a confidant and close friend. Patronage was usually dispensed by the Lord Lieutenant: this sparked a row with Lord Dudley as Lord Lieutenant, and a constitutional argument prompted an appeal to the Prime Minister.

On 20 April 1905, he made an important speech at Belfast emphasizing that he was a stickler for order and the rule of law. However, in the south and west, obdurate landlords refused land sales to tenantry, leading to boycotts and cattle-driving. Substantial damage was done to unionist farms and farmers. MacDonnell continually urged compromise, but Long ignored him. The dispute with Lords Dudley and Dunraven dragged on into August 1905, with their attitude of intransigence towards Long's attempts at Unionist reform and demanding obedience to the law. On 25 May 1905 the issues were discussed in the Commons. He wished to strengthen Unionism, but both Dudley and Long appealed to Balfour for adjudication. Balfour opined that the Chief Secretary was both in the Commons and in the cabinet, so Dudley had to be content that the power of the Lords was waning. During the last quarter of 1905, Long advised the postponement of dissolution, as it would hit Unionists hard in "the Country" and would hand numerous electorates to radicals. He warned of the loss of seats of Bristol West and South. In December 1905, true to his word, Long himself was defeated by 2,692 votes. Long continued to distrust 'Birmingham & Co' as he called Chamberlain's struggle for a policy of tariff recognition, which was already driving the party away from the Free Trade north. Nonetheless, he continued to co-operate internationally with conservative parties in Germany, such as the Deutsche Reichspartei, right up until the Second Moroccan Crisis in 1911.

=== Unionist in opposition ===
Nonetheless, Long's parliamentary career was far from finished. He was also nominated as Unionist candidate for South Dublin in 1906, winning by 1,343 votes. Long became one of the leading opposition voices against the Liberal plans for Home Rule in Ireland. At this stage the Irish Unionist Party's leadership was still in the hands of his friend Edward Saunderson, who was far from energetic, unhelpfully described as "devoid of business capacity".

The dispute with MacDonnell was carried on in the pages of The Times – Long trying to galvanise Unionist opinion in both England and Ireland. Balfour, Jack Sandars (Balfour's private secretary), and Wyndham all thought he had been duped by Unionism "where his vanity and hopes are concerned", characterising the Chief Secretary as easily manipulated. In October 1906, Saunderson died, and Long was chosen as the new Chairman of Irish Unionist Alliance (IUA) – aimed at closer co-operation between northern and southern parties. Three months later, he was also elected as Chairman of the Ulster Unionist Council (UUC). In 1907, he formed the Union Defence League (UDL) to support Irish unionism in Great Britain. The UDL in London linked with the UUC in Belfast and the IUA in Dublin. It had support from Conservative backbenchers but not the leadership. It was active in 1907–1908 and again after 1911 when the Third Home Rule Bill was imminent; with the Primrose League it created the 1914 British Covenant mirroring the 1912 Ulster Covenant. Although Long never openly supported the most militant Unionists, who were prepared to fight the Southern nationalists (and perhaps the British Army) to prevent home rule for Ireland, contemporary accounts indicate that he probably had prior knowledge of the Larne gunrunning.

In the Commons Walter Long was an active opponent of Liberal social legislation. He founded a Budget Protest League to advance the cause of moderate tax changes. In the Lords the defeat of the 'people's budget' led to the constitutional crisis of 1911. He clashed with Edward Carson adopting a similarly equivocal position over the Parliament Bill of 1911, opposing the Bill, but recommending acquiescence. He sat as MP for the Strand between January 1910 and 1918 and St George's between 1918 and 1921.

== Political career, 1911–1921 ==
When Balfour resigned as party leader in November 1911, Long, who had never been happy with his leadership style, was pre-eminent in the Conservative Party and one of the leading candidates to succeed him, the candidate of the 'country party'. As early as 1900, Long had denounced Chamberlain, as the "Conservative Party...will not be led by a bloody radical". However, he was opposed by Austen Chamberlain, who was backed by the Liberal Unionists still under his father's leadership. Long feared 'the degradation' to the party that a divisive contest might split the protectionist majority of the Unionist coalition, so both candidates agreed to withdraw in favour of Bonar Law, the tertium quid, and a relatively unknown figure, on 12 November.

The unification of the Liberal Unionist and Conservative parties at the Carlton Club in 1912, was for Long acknowledgement of the end of its domination by the country interest. Long was always sceptical of coalition, and declared that it would not happen. So with the formation of the wartime coalition government in May 1915, Long's awaited return to office at the Local Government Board was greeted by his surprise. Asquith resisted attempts by Unionists to install Long as Chief Secretary. Long dealt with the plight of thousands of Belgian refugees. He was actively involved in undermining attempts by David Lloyd George to negotiate a deal between Irish Nationalists and Unionists in July 1916 over introducing the suspended Home Rule Act 1914, publicly clashing with his arch-rival Sir Edward Carson. He was accused of plotting to bring down Carson by jeopardising an agreement with the nationalist leader John Redmond, that any partition would only be temporary. When Long wanted to alter the clause to permanent, Redmond abandoned further negotiations. Carson, in a bitter riposte, said of Long "The worst of Walter Long is that he never knows what he wants, but is always intriguing to get it". Austen Chamberlain, in 1911, was similarly critical of Long, saying he was "at the centre of every coterie of grumblers."

Long and the Unionists wanted General Maxwell to have authority over the police, but Asquith finally gave the Chief Secretaryship to a civilian, Henry Duke. With the fall of Asquith and the accession of the Lloyd George government in December 1916, Long had established himself as the cabinet's foremost authority on Irish policy. Chief Secretary Duke would have preferred to be Inspector-General; but Lloyd George, a natural home ruler, did not seem too happy with Long's brand of federated Unionism. Two allies of the Prime Minister, namely Carson and Lord Edward Cecil, supplied the most intransigent opposition to a united Ireland.

It was Long's policy on 16 April 1918 to promote the Conscription bill that would provoke the crisis for Irishness. Duke opposed a policy of conscription without an offer of home rule, whereas Long wanted the former without the latter. The crisis gave rise to the German Plot, and Long's pressure to act on intelligence against Sinn Féiners caused him to issue a large number of arrest warrants.

Long was promoted to the Colonial Office, serving until January 1919, when he became First Lord of the Admiralty, a position in which he served until his retirement to the Lords in 1921. He was Minister-in-charge of the Petroleum Executive, responsible for the strategic allocation of fuel. From October 1919 on, he was, once again, largely concerned with Irish affairs, serving as the chair of the cabinet's Long Committee on Ireland. In this capacity, he was largely responsible for initiating the Partition of Ireland under the Government of Ireland Act 1920, which followed certain proposals of Lloyd George's failed 1917–18 Irish Convention, and created separate home rule governments for Southern Ireland and Northern Ireland, the former subsequently evolving as the Irish Free State.

In March 1921, Bonar Law resigned as party leader due to ill-health. Sir Austen Chamberlain finally succeeded him in the former office after a ten-year wait But Long too, getting tired and old, was 'kicked upstairs' with a peerage. He was appointed Lord-Lieutenant of Wiltshire in February 1920, and was raised to the peerage as Viscount Long, of Wraxall in the County of Wiltshire, in May 1921.

== Personal life ==
Lord Long married Lady Dorothy (Doreen) Blanche, daughter of the 9th Earl of Cork and Orrery, in 1878. They had two sons, including Brigadier General Walter Long, who was killed in action in 1917, and three daughters. He died at his home, Rood Ashton House in Wiltshire, in September 1924, aged 70, and was succeeded by his 13-year-old grandson Walter. Lady Long died in June 1938.

== Bibliography ==
=== Writings ===
- Long, Viscount Walter Hume, Memories (London 1923)

=== Primary sources ===
- Report on the Political and Personal Papers of Walter Hume Long, 1st Viscount Long of Wraxall (1854-1924), Politician, 1880-1924. London. 1977.
- Bateman, John (2014). The Great Landowners of Great Britain and Ireland: List of All Owners of Three Thousand Acres And Upwards, Worth £3,000 A Year, In England, … – British and Irish History, 19th Century). CUP. ISBN 978-1108075954.
- Green, Ewen (1995). Crisis of Conservatism, 1880-1914. Routledge. ISBN 041514339X.
- Hume, Alvin. Ulster Unionist politics: A Political Movement in the Era of Conflict and Change.
- Jackson, Alvin (1989). The Ulster Party: Irish Unionists in the House of Commons, 1884–1911. OUP. ISBN 0198222882.
- Jackson, Alvin (2006). "Walter Hume Long, 1st Baron Long of Wraxall". Oxford Dictionary of National Biography (online ed.). Oxford: Oxford University Press. doi:10.1093/ref:odnb/34591. (Subscription, Wikipedia Library access or UK public library membership required.)
- Jackson, Alvin (2004). Home Rule: An Irish History 1800 – 2000. Phoenix. ISBN 0753817675.
- Jenkins, Roy (1964). Asquith. London: Harper Collins. ISBN 0002110210.
- Kendle, John (16 September 1992). Walter Long, Ireland, and the Union, 1905-1920. Toronto: McGill-Queen's University. ISBN 0773509089.
- Petrie, Sir Charles (1936). Walter Long and his Times. London: Hutchinson.
- Phillips, Gregory (1979). The Diehards. Cambridge, Mass: Harvard University Press.

=== Secondary sources ===
- Brooks, Colin (1998). Fleet Street, Press Barons and Politics: The Journals of Collin Brooks, 1932-1940. CUP.
- Coetzee, F.; Coetzee, M.S. (1986). "Rethinking the Radical Right in Germany and Britain before 1914". Journal of Contemporary History. 21 (4): 515–537. doi:10.1177/002200948602100402. S2CID 154024093.
- Crosby, Gerda Richards (1957). Disarmament and Peace in British Politics, 1914-1919. Boston. p. 39.
- Gordon, Peter (2008). Politics and Society: The Journals of Lady Knightley of Fawsley 1885-1913. London. pp. 248, 254–55, 381, 510. ISBN 978-0901275615.
- Jalland, Martin (1980). The Liberals and Ireland: The Ulster Question in British Politics to 1914. Brighton. ISBN 0312483473.
- Marder, Arthur.J (2014). From the Dreadnought to Scapa Flow: Volume V Victory and Aftermath January 1914 to June 1915. Seaforth.
- Otte, Richard; Otte, Thomas.G; Readman, Paul (2013). By-Elections in British Politics, 1832-1914. Boydell. pp. 128, 255, 268.
- Ramsden, John (1998). An appetite for Power: A History of the Conservative Party since 1830. Harper Collins.
- Winegard, Timothy.C (2011). Indigenous Peoples of the British Dominions and the First World War. CUP.

Parliament of the United Kingdom
Preceded by George Sotheron-Estcourt; Sir George Jenkinson, Bt	Member of Parliament for Wiltshire North; 1880–1885; With: George Sotheron-Estcourt	Constituency abolished
Preceded by Sir Thomas Bateson, Bt	Member of Parliament for Devizes; 1885–1892	Succeeded by Charles Hobhouse
Preceded by Hon. William Cross	Member of Parliament for Liverpool West Derby; 1893–1900	Succeeded by Samuel Higginbottom
Preceded by Sir Edward Stock Hill	Member of Parliament for Bristol South; 1900–1906	Succeeded by Sir Howell Davies
Preceded by John Mooney	Member of Parliament for Dublin South; 1906–1910	Succeeded by Bryan Cooper
Preceded by Frederick Smith	Member of Parliament for Strand; 1910–1918	Constituency abolished
Preceded by Sir Newton Moore	Member of Parliament for Westminster St George's; 1918–1921	Succeeded by James Erskine
Political offices
Preceded by William Copeland Borlase	Parliamentary Secretary to the Local Government Board; 1886–1892	Succeeded by Sir Walter Foster
Preceded by Herbert Gardner	President of the Board of Agriculture; 1895–1900	Succeeded by Robert William Hanbury
Preceded by Henry Chaplin	President of the Local Government Board; 1900–1905	Succeeded by Gerald Balfour
Preceded by George Wyndham	Chief Secretary for Ireland; 1905	Succeeded by James Bryce
Preceded by Herbert Samuel	President of the Local Government Board; 1915–1916	Succeeded by William Hayes Fisher
Preceded by Bonar Law	Secretary of State for the Colonies; 1916–1919	Succeeded by The Viscount Milner
Preceded by Sir Eric Geddes	First Lord of the Admiralty; 1919–1921	Succeeded by The Lord Lee of Fareham
Party political offices
Preceded by Edward James Saunderson	Leader of the Irish Unionist Party in the House of Commons; 1905–1910	Succeeded by Edward Carson
Honorary titles
Preceded by The Marquess of Lansdowne	Lord Lieutenant of Wiltshire; 1920–1924	Succeeded by The Earl of Radnor
Peerage of the United Kingdom
New creation	Viscount Long; 1921–1924	Succeeded by Walter Long
