= 1878 Marlborough by-election =

UK Parliamentary by-election

The 1878 Marlborough by-election was fought on 31 January 1878. The by-election was fought due to the succession to a peerage of the incumbent Liberal MP, Lord Ernest Brudenell-Bruce. It was won by the unopposed Liberal candidate Lord Charles Brudenell-Bruce.
