= Sir John Astley, 1st Baronet =

English politician

Sir John Dugdale Astley, 1st Baronet (27 June 1778 – 19 January 1842) was an English landowner and MP.

He was a member of the Astley family who had owned the manor of Everleigh, Wiltshire, since 1765. His parents were Francis Dugdale Astley and Mary Buckler (died 1804) of Boreham, Wiltshire.

He was Member of Parliament for Wiltshire from 1820 to 1832, and for North Wiltshire from 1832 to 1835.

He was created a baronet, of Everleigh, in the county of Wiltshire on 15 August 1821. He was appointed High Sheriff of Wiltshire for 1836.

Astley was married on 27 July 1803 to Sarah Page of Gosport, Hampshire; they had a son and a daughter:

- Francis Dugdale Astley (1805–1873), succeeded his father as 2nd Baronet
- Mary Anne Astley, married on 19 March 1833 to George Byng, 7th Viscount Torrington (1812–1884), later Governor of Ceylon.

== See also ==
- Astley baronets

Parliament of the United Kingdom
Preceded by John Benett; William Pole-Tylney-Long-Wellesley	Member of Parliament for Wiltshire; 1820–1832; With: John Benett	Constituency abolished
New constituency	Member of Parliament for North Wiltshire; 1832–1835; With: Paul Methuen	Succeeded by Paul Methuen; Walter Long
Baronetage of the United Kingdom
New creation	Baronet (of Everley); 1821–1842	Succeeded by Francis Dugdale Astley
