= Lord Charles Bruce =

British soldier and politician

Captain The Right Honourable Lord Charles Brudenell-Bruce
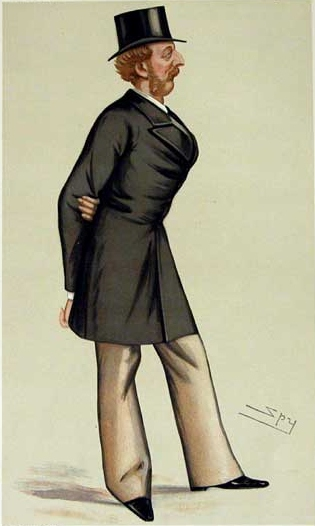
- Lord Charles Bruce, by Leslie Ward, 1882.

Vice-Chamberlain of the Household
- In office 3 May 1880 – 9 June 1885
- Monarch: Victoria
- Prime Minister: William Ewart Gladstone
- Preceded by: The Viscount Barrington
- Succeeded by: Viscount Lewisham

Personal details
- Born: 18 June 1834
- Died: 16 April 1897 (aged 62)
- Party: Liberal
- Spouse: Augusta Seymour (d. 1901)
- Parent(s): Charles Brudenell-Bruce, 1st Marquess of Ailesbury; Maria Elizabeth Tollemache

Captain Lord Charles William Brudenell-Bruce (18 June 1834 – 16 April 1897), was a British soldier and Liberal Party politician. He served as Vice-Chamberlain of the Household under William Ewart Gladstone between 1880 and 1885.

== Background ==
Bruce was the son of Charles Brudenell-Bruce, 1st Marquess of Ailesbury, by his second wife Maria Elizabeth Tollemache, daughter of the Honourable Charles Tollemache, of Harrington, Northamptonshire. George Brudenell-Bruce, 2nd Marquess of Ailesbury, and Ernest Brudenell-Bruce, 3rd Marquess of Ailesbury, were his elder half-brothers.

== Military career ==
Bruce served in the 1st Life Guards. He purchased a captaincy in the regiment on 30 August 1859, succeeding Hon. Dudley FitzGerald-deRos. He was also an Honorary Major in the Royal Wiltshire Yeomanry.

== Political career ==
Bruce sat as Member of Parliament for North Wiltshire from 1865 to 1874 and for Marlborough from 1878 to 1885. In 1880 he was sworn of the Privy Council and appointed Vice-Chamberlain of the Household under William Ewart Gladstone, a post he held until the Liberal government fell in 1885.

== Family ==
Bruce married Augusta Georgiana Sophia Seymour, daughter of Frederick Charles William Seymour and granddaughter of Lord Hugh Seymour, on 2 February 1860. They had no children. He died in April 1897, aged 62. Lady Charles Bruce died in February 1901. In her will, she endowed Lady Charles Bruce's Tooting charity, to provide a church and support for the clergy. This funded the building of All Saints Church, Tooting.

Parliament of the United Kingdom
| Preceded by Walter Long; Thomas Sotheron-Estcourt | Member of Parliament for North Wiltshire; 1865 – 1874; With: Walter Long 1865; Richard Penruddocke Long 1865–1868; Sir George Jenkinson, Bt 1868–1874 | Succeeded by Sir George Jenkinson, Bt; George Sotheron-Estcourt |
| Preceded by Lord Ernest Bruce | Member of Parliament for Marlborough; 1878 – 1885 | Constituency abolished |
Political offices
| Preceded by The Viscount Barrington | Vice-Chamberlain of the Household; 1880–1885 | Succeeded by Viscount Lewisham |
