= Sir George Jenkinson, 11th Baronet =

British Baronet

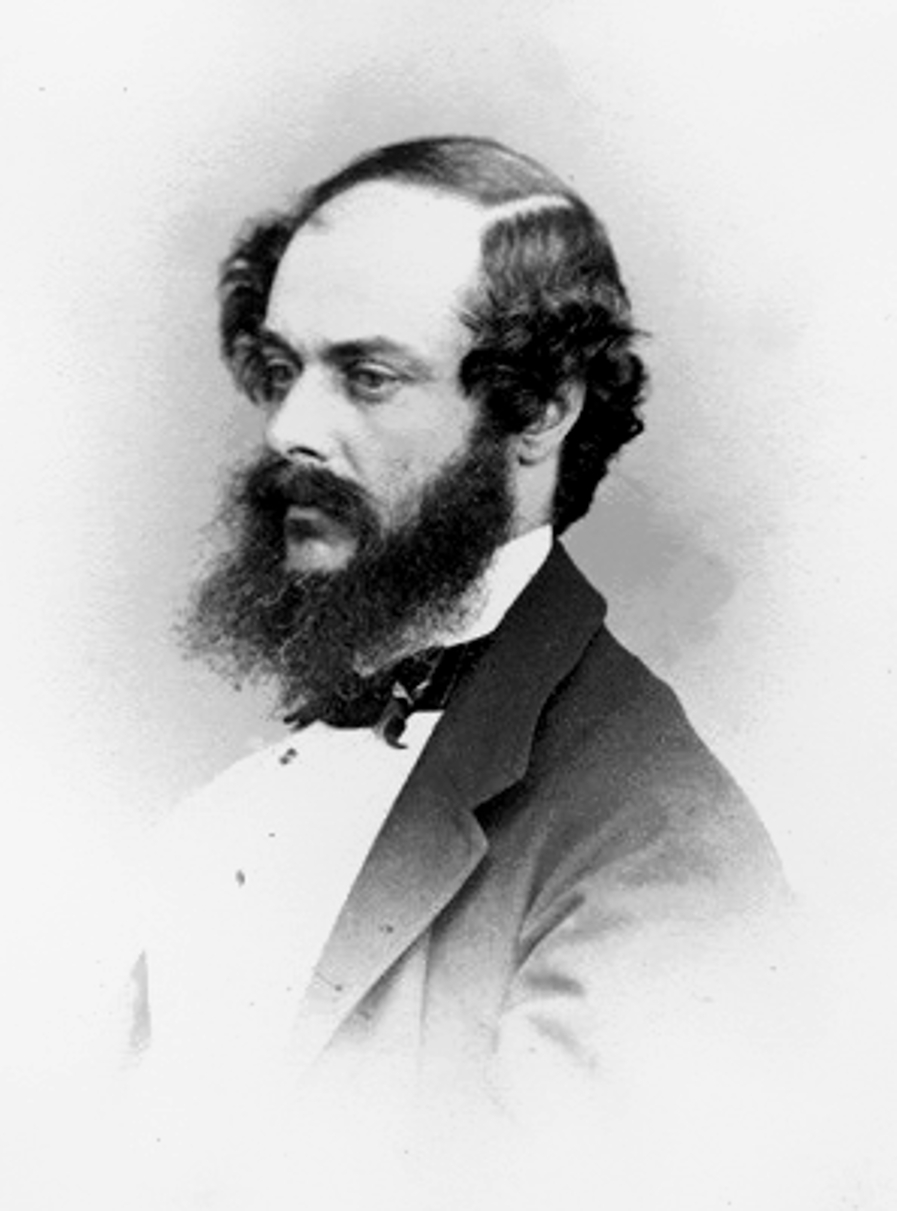
From a cabinet card by Ernest Edwards

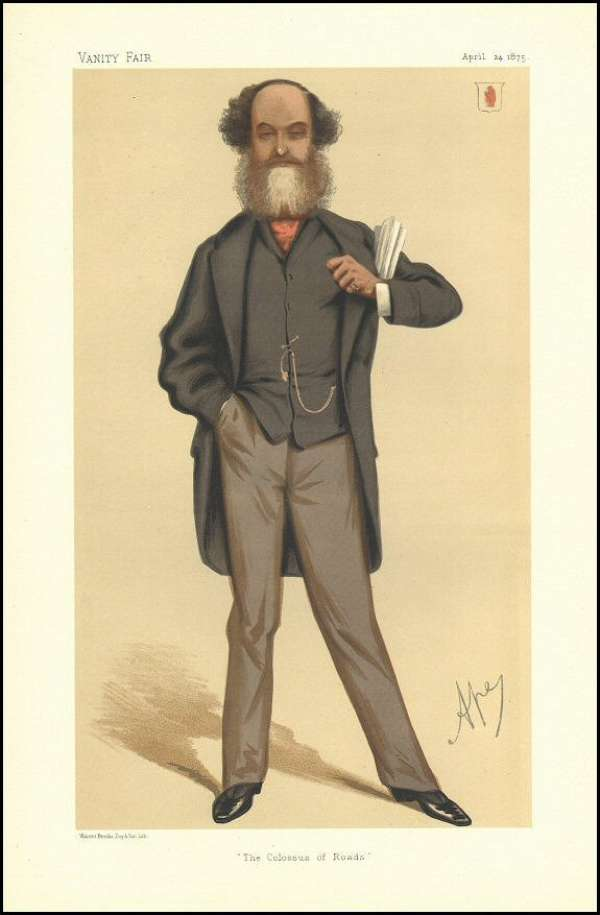
"The Colossus of Roads" Jenkinson as caricatured by "Ape" (Carlo Pellegrini) in Vanity Fair, April 1875.

Sir George Samuel Jenkinson, 11th Baronet (27 September 1817 – 19 January 1892), was a British Conservative politician.

== Background ==
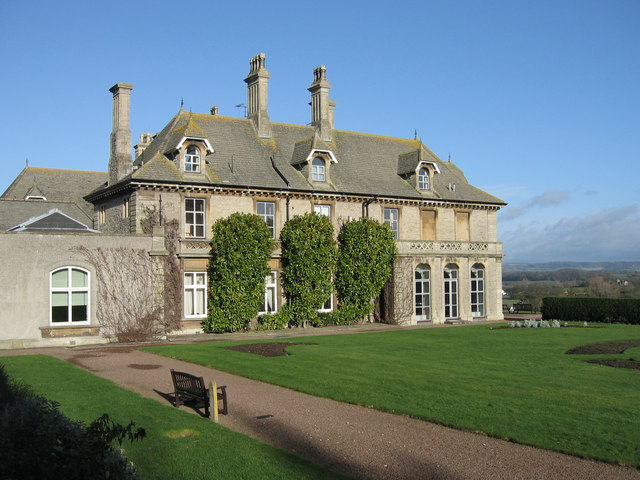
Eastwood Park, Falfield (built in 1820 and finished in 1865, now a venue)

Jenkinson was the son of the Right Reverend John Jenkinson, Bishop of St David's, and Frances Augusta Pechell, daughter of Augustus Pechell. Prime Minister Robert Jenkinson, 2nd Earl of Liverpool, was his first cousin once removed. In 1855 he succeeded his uncle as eleventh Baronet. He died in Eastwood House, Falfield, on 19 January 1892 and was buried in a vault in St George's Church, Falfield. His first cousins from his uncle included Duchess de Montebello and Adelaide Guinness, Viscountess Iveagh

== Political career ==
He served as High Sheriff of Gloucestershire for 1862. He then unsuccessfully contested Wiltshire North in 1865 and Nottingham in 1866. In 1868 he was successfully returned for the former constituency, a seat he held until 1880.

== Family ==
Jenkinson married Emily Sophia Lyster, daughter of Anthony Lyster, in 1845. They had two sons and three daughters. His daughter Louisa married George Finch-Hatton, Viscount Maidstone, son of the 11th Earl of Winchilsea, then secondly to Francis James Ashburner.

He died in January 1892, aged 74, and was succeeded in the baronetcy by his eldest and only surviving son, George. Lady Jenkinson only survived him by a month and died in February 1892. She is best known for having founded the Lady Jenkinson Thalberg Scholarship, in honour of her violin teacher Sigismond Thalberg.

== Sources ==
- Leigh Rayment's list of baronets
- Leigh Rayment's Historical List of MPs
- Falfield Village, community website
- Biography

Parliament of the United Kingdom
Preceded by Lord Charles Bruce; Richard Penruddocke Long	Member of Parliament for Wiltshire North; 1868–1880; With: Lord Charles Bruce 1868–1874; George Sotheron-Estcourt 1874–1880	Succeeded by George Sotheron-Estcourt; Walter Long
Baronetage of England
Preceded by Charles Jenkinson	Baronet (of Walcot and Hawkesbury); 1855–1892	Succeeded by George Banks Jenkinson
