= Richard Needham =

British politician and peer

The Right Honourable The Earl of Kilmorey PC
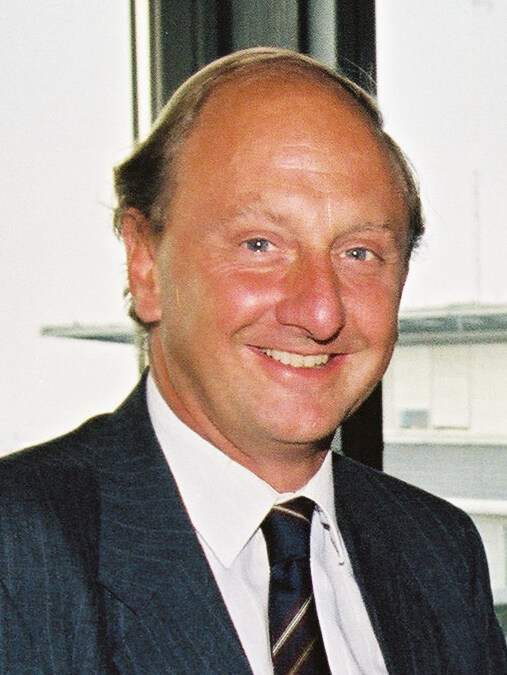
- Needham in 1989

Minister of State for Trade
- In office 14 April 1992 – 6 July 1995
- Prime Minister: John Major
- Preceded by: Tim Sainsbury
- Succeeded by: Anthony Nelson

Parliamentary Under-Secretary of State Northern Ireland
- In office 3 September 1985 – 15 April 1992
- Prime Minister: Thatcher; Major
- Preceded by: Chris Patten
- Succeeded by: None

Parliamentary Private Secretary to the Secretary of State for the Environment
- In office 1984–1985
- Sec. of State: Patrick Jenkin

Parliamentary Private Secretary to the Secretary of State for Northern Ireland
- In office 1983–1984
- Sec. of State: James Prior

Member of Parliament for North Wiltshire (Chippenham 1979–1983)
- In office 3 May 1979 – 8 April 1997
- Preceded by: Daniel Awdry
- Succeeded by: James Gray

Personal details
- Born: 29 January 1942 (age 84)
- Party: Conservative
- Spouse: Sigrid Thiessen-Gairdner (m. 1965)
- Children: 3
- Parent(s): The 5th Earl of Kilmorey; Helen Bridget Faudel-Phillips
- Education: Eton College

Richard Francis Needham, 6th Earl of Kilmorey, PC (born 29 January 1942), usually known as Sir Richard Needham, is a British Conservative politician. A Member of Parliament from 1979 to 1997, he served as Under-Secretary of State for Northern Ireland between 1985 and 1992 and as Minister of State for Trade between 1992 and 1995. From January 1961 until April 1977, he was entitled to use the courtesy title Viscount Newry and Mourne.

== Early life ==
Needham is the eldest of the three sons of the 5th Earl of Kilmorey by his marriage to Helen Bridget Faudel-Phillips, a daughter of Sir Lionel Faudel-Phillips, 3rd and last Baronet. He was educated at Eton. When his father succeeded as the 5th Earl of Kilmorey in January 1961, Needham became entitled to use the courtesy title Viscount Newry and Mourne, or Lord Newry. In April 1977 he succeeded his father and became the 6th Earl.

== Political career ==
Needham was a member of the Somerset County Council between 1967 and 1974. In 1974, he stood unsuccessfully for parliament for the safe Labour seat of Pontefract and Castleford in the February general election, and was then also defeated at the more marginal Gravesend in October. He succeeded his father to the earldom in 1977. This is an Irish peerage and did not bar him from sitting in the House of Commons. At the 1979 general election, he was returned as Member of Parliament for Chippenham in Wiltshire. He was one of the "Wiltshire Wets", Conservative MPs from the county who expressed concern at the perceived loss of jobs resulting from the "monetarist" policies of Margaret Thatcher; in 1990 he called Thatcher "a cow" in a leaked telephone conversation with his wife. His constituency was abolished for the 1983 general election, when he was returned to the House of Commons for the new North Wiltshire constituency. He held the seat until he retired from Parliament at the 1997 general election.

=== In Government ===
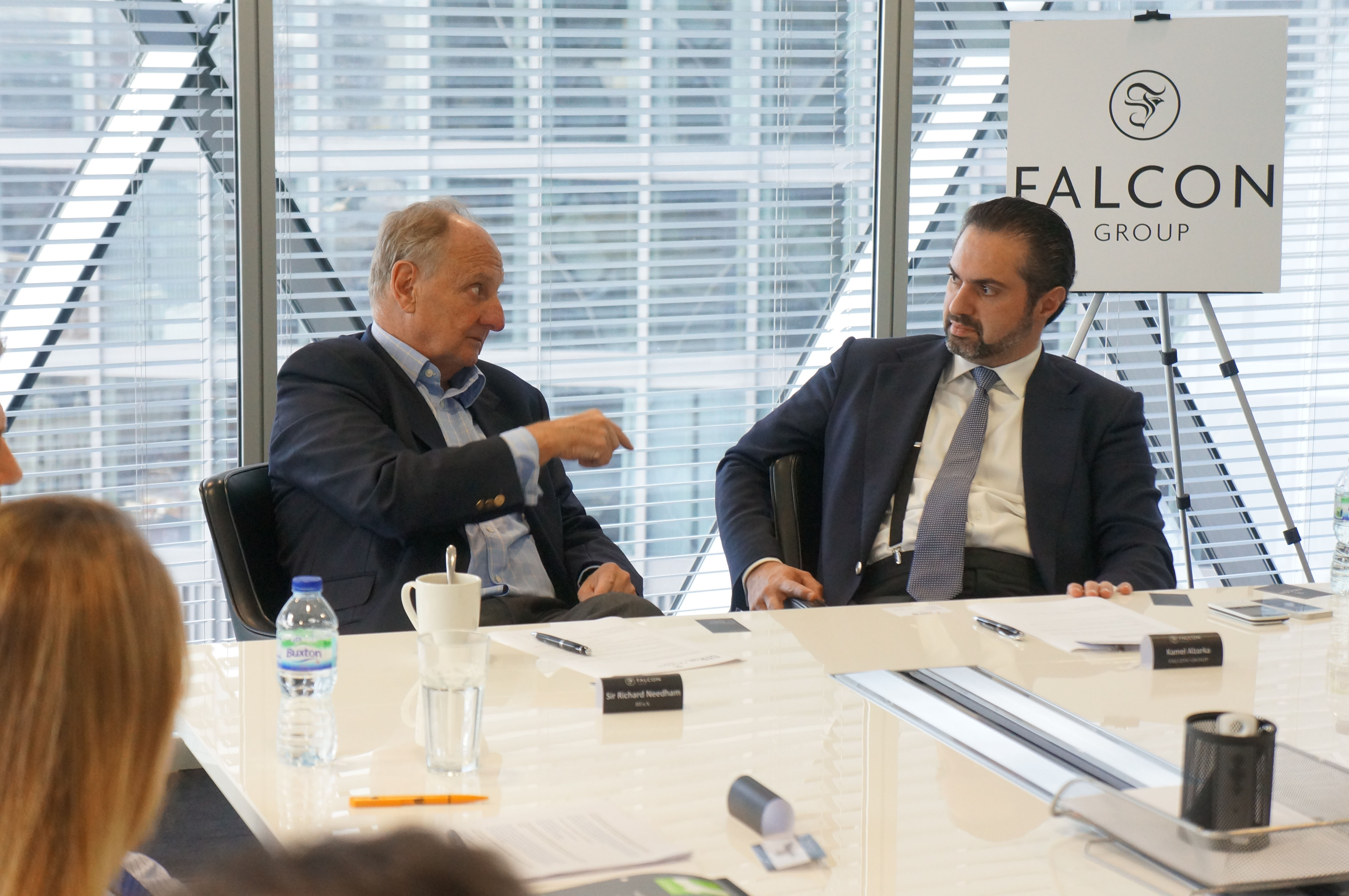
Kamel Alzarka and the Falcon Group welcomed Lord Kilmorey to the 3rd Annual Trade and Corporate Finance Forum in London

Needham was Parliamentary Private Secretary to the Secretary of State for Northern Ireland, James Prior, between 1983 and 1984, and to the Secretary of State for the Environment, Patrick Jenkin, between 1984 and 1985. He served under Thatcher and later John Major as an Under-Secretary of State for Northern Ireland between 1985 and 1992 and under Major as Minister of State for Trade between 1992 and 1995, and was instrumental in transforming Northern Ireland's economic base and the UK's export strategy under Michael Heseltine. He was the longest serving British government Northern Ireland minister.

== Books ==
Lord Kilmorey has written three books: Honourable Member and Battling for Peace: Northern Ireland's Longest-Serving British Minister (1999); an account of his years in Northern Ireland and his contribution to peace. and One Man Two Worlds (2021) a memoir of his life in politics and business

== Honours ==
Lord Kilmorey holds an honorary degree of Doctor of Laws from the University of Ulster. A founder member of the UK-Japan 21st Century Group, he was appointed a member of the Order of the Rising Sun, Gold and Silver Star, by the Emperor of Japan. He was appointed the Order of San Carlos by Juan Manuel Santos, President of Colombia for his work on the Peace Process in Colombia. He was made a Privy Counsellor in 1994 and knighted in 1997.

== Personal life ==
Needham married Sigrid Thiessen-Gairdner, daughter of Ernst Thiessen, in 1965. They have three children:

- Robert Francis John Needham, Viscount Newry and Mourne (b. 1966)
- Hon. Andrew Francis Needham (b. 1969)
- Lady Christina Clare Needham (b. 1977)

Although Needham inherited the Earldom of Kilmorey and Viscountcy of Newry and Mourne on the death of his father in 1977, he did not petition the House of Lords to formally claim succession until October 2012. According to his biography he opted not to use the title as he did not inherit any money with it. The Needham estate, known as Mourne Park, is near Kilkeel in County Down in Northern Ireland but the title and estate were separated when the fifth Earl inherited the title but opted to live in England. The Needham estate or Mourne Park is now owned by the Anley family, descendants of the 4th Earl of Kilmorey. The house was badly damaged by fire on 18 May 2013.

Parliament of the United Kingdom
Preceded by Daniel Awdry	Member of Parliament for Chippenham; 1979 – 1983	Constituency abolished
New constituency	Member of Parliament for North Wiltshire; 1983 – 1997	Succeeded by James Gray
Political offices
Preceded by Nicholas Scott; Chris Patten; The Lord Lyell	Under-Secretary of State for Northern Ireland; 1985–1992; With: Nicholas Scott 1985–1986; The Lord Lyell 1985–1989; Peter Viggers 1986–1989; Brian Mawhinney 1986–1990; Peter Bottomley 1989–1990; The Lord Skelmersdale 1990; Jeremy Hanley 1990–1992	Succeeded by Jeremy Hanley; The Earl of Arran
Preceded by Tim Sainsbury	Minister of State for Trade; 1992–1995	Succeeded by Anthony Nelson
Peerage of Ireland
Preceded by Francis Needham	Earl of Kilmorey; 1977–present	Incumbent
