= Edgar Edmund Estcourt =

English Catholic clergyman (1816–1884)

Edgar Edmund Estcourt, M.A. (1816–1884), was canon of St. Chad's Roman Catholic Cathedral, Birmingham.

== Life ==
Estcourt, born 7 February 1816, was the eldest son of the Rev. Edmund William Estcourt of Newntown, Wiltshire, one of the Estcourts of Estcourt, Gloucestershire. He was destined for the church; entered Exeter College, Oxford, 20 February 1834; proceeded B.A. 1838 and M.A. 1840; and came under the influence of the Tractarian movement.

In 1845, when J. H. Newman went over to the church of Rome, Estcourt, then a clergyman at Cirencester, followed him, and was 'received' at Prior Park in December of that year. About three years after he was ordained a catholic priest by Dr. Ullathorne, vicar-apostolic of the western district, and on the restoration of the hierarchy in 1850 he was appointed æconomus of the diocese. Though one of the kindest of men, he had great firmness of character. He was a great lover of books, and for many years he was a most useful member of the committee of the London Library. Suffering from a painful internal disorder, he passed the last few years of his life in retirement at Leamington, where he died on 16 April 1884. He was buried at Kenilworth. Bishop Ullathorne, in an address delivered on the occasion, pronounced a well-merited eulogy on Estcourt's 'assiduity, accuracy, punctuality, skill, and sound judgment.' His knowledge of the earlier history of the midland district was remarkable, as was also the knowledge he had acquired of property law. His generosity and charity were of the most self-denying character, and his disposition refined, modest, and unobtrusive.

== Works ==
His literary abilities appear in the best known of his works, 'The Question of Anglican Ordinations discussed,’ 1873. This controversial treatise by an erudite member of the Roman church, with a valuable appendix of original documents and facsimiles, appeared at a time when the vexed question of the validity of English orders was fiercely debated by members of the Anglican and Roman communions, and it attracted considerable attention (Academy, 26 April 1884). An anonymous reply to the work appeared, with the title 'Anglican Orders, a few remarks in the form of a conversation on the recent work by Canon Estcourt,' 8vo, London, 1873. An article, originally prepared by Estcourt for the 'Dublin Review,' was published separately instead, under the title, 'Dogmatic Teaching of the Book of Common Prayer on the subject of the Holy Eucharist,' 8vo. London, 1868. Estcourt left unpublished a work of considerable interest, 'The Memoir of Jane Dormer, Duchess of Feria,' the materials for which he slowly accumulated during a period of twenty-five years. The first nine chapters were completed, and materials were made ready for nine more. The fragments were placed in the hands of the Rev. Joseph Stevenson, S. J., and the book appeared in 1887.
