= North Wiltshire (constituency) =

UK Parliament constituency (1832–1885, 1983–2024)

- Former county constituency for the House of Commons
- Boundary of North Wiltshire in Wiltshire for the 2010 general election

- Location of Wiltshire within England
- County: Wiltshire
- Electorate: 67,154 (December 2010)
- Major settlements: Calne, Royal Wootton Bassett, Cricklade, Malmesbury

1983–2024
- Seats: One
- Created from: Chippenham
- Replaced by: Chippenham; Melksham and Devizes; South Cotswolds

1832–1885
- Replaced by: Cricklade; Chippenham; Devizes; Westbury

North Wiltshire was a constituency (Note: A county constituency (for the purposes of election expenses and type of returning officer).) in the House of Commons of the UK Parliament. It was represented since its 1983 recreation by the Conservative Party. (Note: As with all constituencies, the constituency elects one Member of Parliament (MP) by the first past the post system of election at least every five years.) In the period 1832–1983, North Wiltshire was an alternative name for Chippenham or the Northern Division of Wiltshire and as Chippenham dates to the original countrywide Parliament, the Model Parliament, this period is covered in more detail in that article.

The seat was abolished for the 2024 general election and replaced by parts of three other constituencies.

== Boundaries ==
Map of boundaries 2010–2024

1832–1885: The Hundreds of Chippenham, North Damerham, Bradford, Melksham, Potterne and Cannings, Calne, Selkley, Ramsbury, Whorwelsdown, Swanborough, Highworth, Cricklade and Staple, Kingsbridge, and Malmesbury.

1983–1997: The District of North Wiltshire.

1997–2010: The District of North Wiltshire wards of Allington, Ashton Keynes, Audley, Avon, Box, Bremhill, Brinkworth, Colerne, Corsham, Crudwell, Hill Rise, Hilmarton, Kington Langley, Kington St Michael, Lacock, Lyneham, Malmesbury, Malmesbury Road, Minety, Monkton Park, Neston and Gastard, Nettleton, Park, Pickwick, Purton, Queen's, Redland, St Paul Malmesbury Without, Sherston, Somerford, The Lydiards, Town, Westcroft, Wootton Bassett North, and Wootton Bassett South.

2010–2024: The District of North Wiltshire wards of Ashton Keynes and Minety, Box, Bremhill, Brinkworth and The Somerfords, Calne Abberd, Calne Chilvester, Calne Lickhill, Calne Marden, Calne Priestley, Calne Quemerford, Calne Without, Colerne, Cricklade, Hilmarton, Kington Langley, Kington St Michael, Lyneham, Malmesbury, Nettleton, Purton, St Paul Malmesbury Without and Sherston, The Lydiards and Broad Town, Wootton Bassett North, and Wootton Bassett South.

The constituency covered most of the northern third of Wiltshire. However, it excluded the eastern town of Swindon which was represented as North Swindon and South Swindon.

North Wiltshire constituency was formed by a renaming for the 1983 general election, with boundaries identical to the former Chippenham constituency (1885–1983). The constituency sat between the Cotswolds and Swindon. Its main towns were Calne, Royal Wootton Bassett, Cricklade and Malmesbury, and it also contained villages, both small and large, spread over a large area of farming countryside, including the well-known (often-painted and photographed) village of Castle Combe.

For the 2010 general election the North Wiltshire constituency changed radically as a result of boundary change recommendations. The revised constituency covered a northern swathe of the previous version, retaining the towns of Malmesbury, Cricklade, Royal Wootton Bassett and Calne, (Note: Since 2010 Calne is the furthest south) while the largest southern town of Chippenham was given its own seat (which was previously abolished in 1983) that brought in the nearby market towns of Bradford on Avon and Melksham.

== Abolition ==
As a result of the 2023 review of Westminster constituencies, the seat was abolished with effect from the 2024 general election, with its voters distributed into three others:

- Some northern and western electoral divisions, including Cricklade, Purton, and Malmesbury, went into the new seat of South Cotswolds
- Some southern and eastern divisions, including Royal Wootton Bassett, Lyneham, and most of the town of Calne, were added to a restored Chippenham constituency
- The Box and Colerne and the Calne South division were put into the new seat of Melksham and Devizes

== Members of Parliament ==
=== MPs 1832–1885 ===
Election	First member	First party	Second member	Second party
1832	Paul Methuen	Whig	Sir John Astley, Bt	Whig
1835	Paul Methuen	Whig	Walter Long	Whig
1837	Francis Burdett	Conservative	Walter Long	Whig
1841	Francis Burdett	Conservative	Walter Long	Conservative
February 1844	T. H. S. Sotheron-Estcourt	Conservative	Walter Long	Conservative
March 1865	Lord Charles Bruce	Liberal	Walter Long	Conservative
1865	Lord Charles Bruce	Liberal	Richard Penruddocke Long	Conservative
1868	Lord Charles Bruce	Liberal	George Jenkinson	Conservative
1874	George Sotheron-Estcourt	Conservative	George Jenkinson	Conservative
1880	George Sotheron-Estcourt	Conservative	Walter Long	Conservative
1885	Redistribution of Seats Act: constituency abolished; see Chippenham constituency			

=== MPs since 1983 ===
Election	Member	Party
1983	Richard Needham	Conservative
1997	James Gray	Conservative

== Elections ==
=== Elections in the 2010s ===
General election 2019: North Wiltshire
Party	Candidate	Votes	%	±%
Conservative	James Gray	32,373	59.1	▼1.2
Liberal Democrats	Brian Mathew	14,747	26.9	▲9.2
Labour	Jonathan Fisher	5,699	10.4	▼7.1
Green	Bonnie Jackson	1,939	3.5	▲1.4
Majority		17,626	32.2	▼10.4
Turnout		54,758	75.0	▼0.3
Conservative hold		Swing	▼5.2	

General election 2017: North Wiltshire
Party	Candidate	Votes	%	±%
Conservative	James Gray	32,398	60.3	▲3.1
Liberal Democrats	Brian Mathew	9,521	17.7	▲2.1
Labour	Peter Baldrey	9,399	17.5	▲7.7
Green	Phil Chamberlain	1,141	2.1	▼2.5
UKIP	Paddy Singh	871	1.6	▼9.9
Independent	Lisa Tweedie	376	0.7	New
Majority		22,877	42.6	▲1.0
Turnout		53,706	75.34	▲0.84
Conservative hold		Swing	▲0.5	

General election 2015: North Wiltshire
Party	Candidate	Votes	%	±%
Conservative	James Gray	28,938	57.2	▲5.6
Liberal Democrats	Brian Mathew	7,892	15.6	▼20.6
UKIP	Pat Bryant	5,813	11.5	▲7.6
Labour	Peter Baldrey	4,930	9.8	▲3.1
Green	Phil Chamberlain	2,350	4.6	▲3.4
Independent	Simon Killane	390	0.8	New
Independent	Giles Wareham	243	0.5	New
Majority		21,046	41.6	▲26.2
Turnout		50,556	74.5	▲1.1
Conservative hold		Swing	▲13.15	

General election 2010: North Wiltshire
Party	Candidate	Votes	%	±%
Conservative	James Gray	25,114	51.6	+1.9
Liberal Democrats	Michael Evemy	17,631	36.2	+1.8
Labour	Jason Hughes	3,239	6.7	−5.3
UKIP	Charles Bennett	1,908	3.9	+1.2
Green	Philip Chamberlain	599	1.2	New
Independent	Philip Allnatt	208	0.4	−0.6
Majority		7,483	15.4	+5.9
Turnout		48,699	73.4	+3.9
Conservative hold		Swing	+0.05	

=== Elections in the 2000s ===
General election 2005: North Wiltshire
Party	Candidate	Votes	%	±%
Conservative	James Gray	26,282	46.9	+1.4
Liberal Democrats	Paul Fox	20,979	37.4	−0.8
Labour	David Nash	6,794	12.1	−2.2
UKIP	Neil Dowdney	1,428	2.5	+0.4
Independent	Philip Allnatt	578	1.0	New
Majority		5,303	9.5	+2.2
Turnout		56,061	69.3	+2.0
Conservative hold		Swing	+1.1	

General election 2001: North Wiltshire
Party	Candidate	Votes	%	±%
Conservative	James Gray	24,090	45.5	+1.7
Liberal Democrats	Hugh Pym	20,212	38.2	+0.4
Labour	Joanne Garton	7,556	14.3	+0.1
UKIP	Neil Dowdney	1,090	2.1	+1.4
Majority		3,878	7.3	+1.3
Turnout		52,948	67.3	−7.6
Conservative hold		Swing	+0.7	

=== Elections in the 1990s ===
General election 1997: North Wiltshire
Party	Candidate	Votes	%	±%
Conservative	James Gray	25,390	43.8	−12.4
Liberal Democrats	Simon Cordon	21,915	37.8	+6.3
Labour	Nigel Knowles	8,261	14.2	+4.1
Referendum	Margaret Purves	1,774	3.1	New
UKIP	Alan Wood	410	0.7	New
Natural Law	Joan Forsyth	263	0.4	New
Majority		3,475	6.0	−16.4
Turnout		58,013	74.9	−6.8
Conservative hold		Swing	−9.3	

General election 1992: North Wiltshire
Party	Candidate	Votes	%	±%
Conservative	Richard Needham	39,028	55.6	+0.5
Liberal Democrats	Christine Napier	22,640	32.3	−5.8
Labour	Christine Reid	6,945	9.9	+3.1
Green	Lydia Howitt	850	1.2	New
Liberal	George Hawkins	622	0.9	New
Independent	David Martienssen	66	0.1	New
Majority		16,388	23.4	+6.4
Turnout		70,151	81.7	+2.4
Conservative hold		Swing	+3.1	

=== Elections in the 1980s ===
General election 1987: North Wiltshire
Party	Candidate	Votes	%	±%
Conservative	Richard Needham	35,309	55.1	+2.1
Liberal	Christopher Graham	24,370	38.1	−2.5
Labour	Christine Reid	4,343	6.8	+1.8
Majority		10,939	17.0	+4.6
Turnout		64,022	79.3	+2.7
Conservative hold		Swing		

General election 1983: North Wiltshire
Party	Candidate	Votes	%	±%
Conservative	Richard Needham	30,924	53.0	+3.9
Liberal	Christopher Graham	23,692	40.6	−0.7
Labour	Stephen Allsop	2,888	5.0	−3.7
Ecology	Edward Barham	678	1.2	New
Justice for Divorced Fathers	Henri de la Perriere	113	0.2	New
Majority		7,232	12.4	N/A
Turnout		58,295	76.6	4.5
Conservative win (new seat)				

=== Elections in the 1880s ===
General election 1880: North Wiltshire (2 seats)
Party	Candidate	Votes	%	±%
Conservative	Walter Long	3,090	35.5	−0.5
Conservative	George Sotheron-Estcourt	2,836	32.6	−4.2
Liberal	George Fuller	2,784	32.0	+4.8
Majority		52	0.6	−8.2
Turnout		5,747 (est)	79.3 (est)	+2.1
Registered electors		7,249		
Conservative hold		Swing	−1.5	
Conservative hold		Swing	−3.3	

=== Elections in the 1870s ===
General election 1874: North Wiltshire (2 seats)
Party	Candidate	Votes	%	±%
Conservative	George Bucknall-Estcourt	3,195	36.8	+18.0
Conservative	George Jenkinson	3,129	36.0	+17.2
Liberal	Charles Bruce	2,358	27.2	−35.3
Majority		771	8.8	+6.5
Turnout		5,520 (est)	77.2 (est)	+3.2
Registered electors		7,152		
Conservative hold		Swing	+17.8	
Conservative gain from Liberal		Swing	+17.4	

=== Elections in the 1860s ===
General election 1868: North Wiltshire (2 seats)
Party	Candidate	Votes	%	±%
Conservative	George Jenkinson	2,769	37.5	−23.0
Liberal	Charles Bruce	2,600	35.2	+15.4
Liberal	Joseph Trigge Schomberg	2,016	27.3	+7.5
Majority		169	2.3	
Turnout		5,077 (est)	74.0 (est)	+0.3
Registered electors		6,857		
Conservative hold		Swing	−17.2	
Liberal hold		Swing	+13.5	

General election 1865: North Wiltshire (2 seats)
Party	Candidate	Votes	%	±%
Liberal	Charles Bruce	2,151	39.6	N/A
Conservative	Richard Penruddocke Long	1,911	35.2	N/A
Conservative	George Jenkinson	1,373	25.3	N/A
Majority		240	4.4	N/A
Turnout		3,793 (est)	73.7 (est)	N/A
Registered electors		5,146		
Liberal gain from Conservative		Swing	N/A	
Conservative hold		Swing	N/A	

By-election 20 March 1865: North Wiltshire
Party	Candidate	Votes	%	±%
Liberal	Charles Bruce	Unopposed		
Liberal gain from Conservative				

- Caused by Sotheron-Estcourt's resignation due to ill health.

=== Elections in the 1850s ===
General election 1859: North Wiltshire (2 seats)
Party	Candidate	Votes	%	±%
Conservative	T. H. S. Sotheron-Estcourt	Unopposed		
Conservative	Walter Long	Unopposed		
Registered electors		4,417		
Conservative hold				
Conservative hold				

By-election 8 March 1859: North Wiltshire
Party	Candidate	Votes	%	±%
Conservative	T. H. S. Sotheron-Estcourt	Unopposed		
Conservative hold				

- Caused by Sotheron-Estcourt's appointment as Home Secretary

By-election 5 March 1858: North Wiltshire
Party	Candidate	Votes	%	±%
Conservative	T. H. S. Sotheron-Estcourt	Unopposed		
Conservative hold				

- Caused by Sotheron-Estcourt's appointment as President of the Poor Law Board

General election 1857: North Wiltshire (2 seats)
Party	Candidate	Votes	%	±%
Conservative	T. H. S. Sotheron-Estcourt	Unopposed		
Conservative	Walter Long	Unopposed		
Registered electors		4,400		
Conservative hold				
Conservative hold				

General election 1852: North Wiltshire (2 seats)
Party	Candidate	Votes	%	±%
Conservative	T. H. S. Sotheron	Unopposed		
Conservative	Walter Long	Unopposed		
Registered electors		4,955		
Conservative hold				
Conservative hold				

=== Elections in the 1840s ===
General election 1847: North Wiltshire (2 seats)
Party	Candidate	Votes	%	±%
Conservative	T. H. S. Sotheron	Unopposed		
Conservative	Walter Long	Unopposed		
Registered electors		5,165		
Conservative hold				
Conservative hold				

By-election, 12 February 1844: North Wiltshire (2 seats)
Party	Candidate	Votes	%	±%
Conservative	T. H. S. Sotheron	Unopposed		
Conservative hold				

- Caused by Burdett's death.

General election 1841: North Wiltshire (2 seats)
Party	Candidate	Votes	%	±%
Conservative	Francis Burdett	Unopposed		
Conservative	Walter Long	Unopposed		
Registered electors		5,241		
Conservative hold				
Conservative gain from Whig				

=== Elections in the 1830s ===
General election 1837: North Wiltshire (2 seats)
Party	Candidate	Votes	%
Conservative	Francis Burdett	2,365	36.7
Whig	Walter Long	2,197	34.1
Whig	Paul Methuen	1,876	29.1
Majority		321	5.0
Turnout		4,183	82.5
Registered electors		5,068	
Conservative gain from Whig			
Whig hold			

General election 1835: North Wiltshire (2 seats)
Party	Candidate	Votes	%
Whig	Walter Long	Unopposed	
Whig	Paul Methuen	Unopposed	
Registered electors		3,560	
Whig hold			
Whig hold			

General election 1832: North Wiltshire (2 seats)
Party	Candidate	Votes	%
Whig	Paul Methuen	1,835	46.8
Whig	John Astley	1,683	42.9
Radical	John Edridge	403	10.3
Majority		1,280	32.6
Turnout		2,332	64.5
Registered electors		3,614	
Whig win (new seat)			
Whig win (new seat)			

== See also ==
- parliamentary constituencies in Wiltshire
