= Margaret Purves =

British George Cross recipient (1934–2021)

- Born: 25 November 1934; Cardiff, Wales
- Died: 12 September 2021 (aged 86)
- Occupation: Nurse
- Awards: Albert Medal for Lifesaving

Margaret Purves GC (née Vaughan; 25 November 1934 – 12 September 2021) was a British nurse who received the Albert Medal for an act of bravery when she was only 14 years old. In 1971, the Albert Medal was discontinued (along with the Edward Medal) and all living recipients were invited to exchange the award for the George Cross.

== Early life ==
Margaret Vaughan was born in Cardiff, Wales. Her father James Boswell Vaughan was a Chief Superintendent of Cardiff City Police and her mother was Dorothy May Vaughan (née Powditch).

In 1949, Vaughan was awarded the Albert Medal after she saved a Boy Scout and his leader from a rough sea off the coast of Cardiff. Notice of the award was published in the London Gazette on 1 November 1949. She became one of the few living holders of the Albert Medal.

== Albert Medal citation ==
Purves received her decoration from King George VI at Buckingham Palace. Her citation read:

The KING has been pleased to award the Albert Medal to Margaret Vaughan and the late John Howard Davies for their gallantry in the following circumstances: —

On May 28th, 1949, a party of Scouts, aged between 11 and 15 years, visiting Sully Island were cut off by the rising tide from a causeway which led to the mainland. Most of the boys got safely across, but two of them were forced off the causeway by the strong tide. The leader of the party returned to help the elder boy but in the struggle he too became exhausted. Margaret Vaughan (aged 14 years) saw from the beach the difficulties they were in. She undressed and swam towards them over a distance of some 30 yards in cold, rough water and against strong currents due to the rising tide. On reaching them she towed the boy to the shore while he supported himself by grasping the straps of her costume and his leader's coat. At about ten feet from the shore a life belt was thrown in which the boy was placed by the other two and the three reached the shore safely. Margaret Vaughan's action probably saved the life of the Scout leader as well as that of the elder boy.

Meanwhile, John Howard Davies (aged 13 years) had safely reached the mainland when he saw that his friend, who was unable to swim, was being forced away from the causeway into deep water. He stripped to the waist and went back along the causeway to help him. By swimming out he was able to grasp his friend, and hold him up in the water. Both boys shouted for help and it was obvious that they would not get ashore unaided. By this time a rescue boat had put out from the shore but Davies became exhausted by his efforts and before the boat could reach them he was forced to release his hold on his friend and they drifted apart. The boat rescued the friend but no further sign of Davies was seen. His body was subsequently recovered. There is no doubt that in returning to the aid of his friend after he himself had reached safety Davies gave his life in this rescue attempt.

Vaughan was the last living person to receive the Albert Medal; it was declared a posthumous-only award later in 1949.

From the total of 64 eligible to exchange the Albert Medal for the George Cross in 1971, 49 took up the option, including Margaret Purves. She was invested with the George Cross by the Queen at Buckingham Palace in 1974.

== Later life ==
After leaving school, Margaret Vaughan trained as a nurse, and from 1957 served as an officer in the Queen Alexandra's Royal Army Nursing Corps. She married Captain John Watt Purves of the Royal Electrical and Mechanical Engineers at Llandaff Cathedral in 1961, six months after meeting him in a military hospital bed in Hanover.

In 1983 Purves and her husband retired from the army and settled at Bradford-on-Avon in Wiltshire, where she served on the town and county councils until 1989. She was the Referendum Party candidate in North Wiltshire at the 1997 election.

In 2016, the National Portrait Gallery purchased a portrait of Purves by photographer Rory Lewis for its permanent collection.
