= George Sotheron-Estcourt, 1st Baron Estcourt =

British politician

George Thomas John Sotheron-Estcourt, 1st Baron Estcourt (21 January 1839 – 12 January 1915), known as George Bucknall-Estcourt until 1876 and as George Sotheron-Estcourt from 1876 to 1903, was a British Conservative Party politician.

== Background ==
Estcourt was the only son of Reverend Edmund Hiley Bucknall-Estcourt, son of Thomas Bucknall-Estcourt, Member of Parliament for Devizes and the University of Oxford, son of Thomas Grimston Estcourt, Member of Parliament for Cricklade. His mother was Anne Elizabeth, daughter of Sir John Lowther Johnstone, 6th Baronet, while Thomas Sotheron-Estcourt was his uncle. In 1876, he succeeded to the latter's estates and assumed by Royal licence the surname of Sotheron-Estcourt.

== Political career ==
Estcourt sat as Member of Parliament for Wiltshire North from 1874 to 1885. In 1903 he was raised to the peerage as Baron Estcourt, of Estcourt in the Parish of Shipton Moyne in the County of Gloucester and of Darrington in the West Riding of the County of York.

Escutcheon of Baron Estcourt

== Personal life ==
Lord Estcourt married Monica, daughter of Reverend Martin Stepylton, in 1863. They had no children. He died in January 1915, aged 75, when the barony became extinct. Lady Estcourt died in March 1922.

== See also ==
Parliament of the United Kingdom
Preceded by Lord Charles Bruce; Sir George Jenkinson, Bt	Member of Parliament for Wiltshire North; 1874–1885; With: Sir George Jenkinson, Bt 1874–1880; Walter Long 1880–1885	Constituency abolished
Peerage of the United Kingdom
New creation	Baron Estcourt; 1903–1915	Extinct
