= T. H. S. Sotheron-Estcourt =

English politician (1801–1876)

The Right Honourable T. H. S. Sotheron-Estcourt DL JP
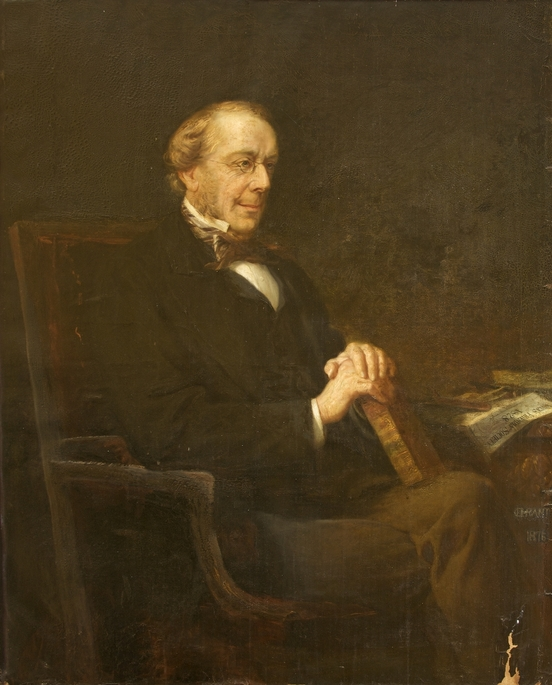

Home Secretary
- In office 3 March 1859 – 18 June 1859
- Monarch: Victoria
- Prime Minister: Edward Smith-Stanley, 14th Earl of Derby
- Preceded by: Spencer Horatio Walpole
- Succeeded by: Sir George Cornewall Lewis, 2nd Baronet

Personal details
- Born: Thomas Henry Sutton Sotheron-Estcourt; 4 April 1801
- Died: 6 January 1876 (aged 74)
- Party: Conservative
- Spouse(s): Lucy Sarah Sotheron (d. 1870)
- Education: Oriel College, Oxford

Thomas Henry Sutton Sotheron-Estcourt PC DL JP (4 April 1801 – 6 January 1876), known as Thomas Bucknall-Estcourt until 1839 and as Thomas Sotheron from 1839 to 1855, was a British Conservative politician.

== Early life and education ==
Sotheron-Estcourt was born on 4 April 1801, the eldest son of Thomas Grimston Estcourt, Member of Parliament (MP) for Devizes and Oxford University, son of Thomas Estcourt, Member of Parliament for Cricklade. His mother was Eleanor, daughter of James Sutton. He was educated at Harrow School from 1813, and matriculated in 1818 at Oriel College, Oxford, graduating B.A. in 1823, M.A. in 1826.

== Politics ==
Estcourt was elected to Parliament as MP for Marlborough in 1829. He was elected to parliament again in 1835 as MP for Devizes, switched to North Wiltshire in 1844, and continued in the Commons until 1865. Sotheron resumed the name Estcourt in 1855, and entered Lord Derby's second government in 1858 as President of the Poor Law Board. The next year, he became Home Secretary, but the government soon fell. He had been sworn of the Privy Council in 1858.

== Later life and death ==
Sotheron-Estcourt retired from public life in 1863 after a paralytic seizure. He died on 6 January 1876, aged 74. His wife had died in 1870.

== Family ==
Sotheron-Estcourt married Lucy Sarah, daughter of Admiral Frank Sotheron, in 1830. In 1839, he assumed by Royal licence the surname of Sotheron in lieu of his patronymic in order to inherit his father-in-law's property. However, in 1853 he resumed by Royal licence the surname of Estcourt in addition to that of Sotheron.

Sotheron-Estcourt's estates passed to his nephew George Bucknall-Estcourt, who assumed the surname of Sotheron-Estcourt and was created Baron Estcourt in 1903.

Parliament of the United Kingdom
Preceded by Lord Brudenell; Earl Bruce	Member of Parliament for Marlborough; 1829–1832; With: Lord Brudenell 1829; William John Bankes 1829–1832	Succeeded by Lord Ernest Bruce; Henry Bingham Baring
Preceded by Wadham Locke; Sir Philip Charles Durham	Member of Parliament for Devizes; 1835–1844; With: Sir Philip Charles Durham 1835–1836; James Whitley Deans Dundas 1836–1838; George Heneage Walker Heneage 1838–1884	Succeeded by George Heneage Walker Heneage; William Heald Ludlow Bruges
Preceded by Walter Long; Sir Francis Burdett, Bt	Member of Parliament for North Wiltshire; 1844–1865; With: Walter Long	Succeeded by Walter Long; Lord Charles Bruce
Political offices
Preceded by Edward Pleydell Bouverie	President of the Poor Law Board; 1858–1859	Succeeded by Earl of March
Preceded by Spencer Horatio Walpole	Secretary of State for the Home Department; 1859	Succeeded by Sir George Cornewall Lewis, Bt
