= Cronus Airlines =

Greek airline

IATA	ICAO	Call sign
X5	CUS	Cronus
- Founded: 1994
- Ceased operations: 2001 (merged into Aegean Airlines)
- Hubs: Athens International Airport
- Focus cities: Athens, Thessaloniki, Heraklion
- Frequent-flyer program: Cronus Club
- Fleet size: 7
- Destinations: 14
- Headquarters: Athens, Greece
- Key people: Ioannis Manetas, Panos and Thanasis Laskaridis

Cronus Airlines was a Greek airline based in Athens. It operated scheduled as well as chartered flights using a fleet of Boeing 737-300 & 400 aircraft.

== History ==
Cronus Airlines was established in 1994 by Ret. Air Force fighter pilot Captain Theodore Kokmotos, started operation in 1995 with a single aircraft that flew flights targeting expat traffic between Greece and Germany as well as chartered flights to popular tourist destinations. Two years later, Cronus leased more aircraft and expanded its network, gradually becoming the largest privately owned airline in Greece. In late December 1998, the Laskaridis family who own a large fleet of refrigerator ships, acquired a controlling 55% stake in Cronus. In spring 2001, a code-share agreement was signed with Aegean Airlines and a few months later Cronus' aircraft were painted in Aegean's livery carrying an AEGEANCronus logo. Eventually, Cronus was fully acquired by Aegean in October 2001 and its owners obtained a minority share in Aegean.

== Destinations ==
Cronus Airlines operated scheduled services from/to the following cities:

- Athens, Thessaloniki, Heraklion, Chania, Rhodes, Kavala and Alexandroupolis.

International destinations:

- London, Paris, Rome, Munich, Frankfurt, Stuttgart, Cologne and Düsseldorf.

In general terms, flights to London, Paris and Rome were operated from Athens, while those to Germany were mostly continuations of the domestic flights to Salonica, therefore passengers from Athens to German destinations would fly to Salonica and then remain on the same plane for the leg to Germany. There were also flights between Stuttgart and Kavala. |}

== Historic Fleet ==
Starting in 2001, all these aircraft were transferred to Aegean Airlines upon its merger with Cronus Airlines.

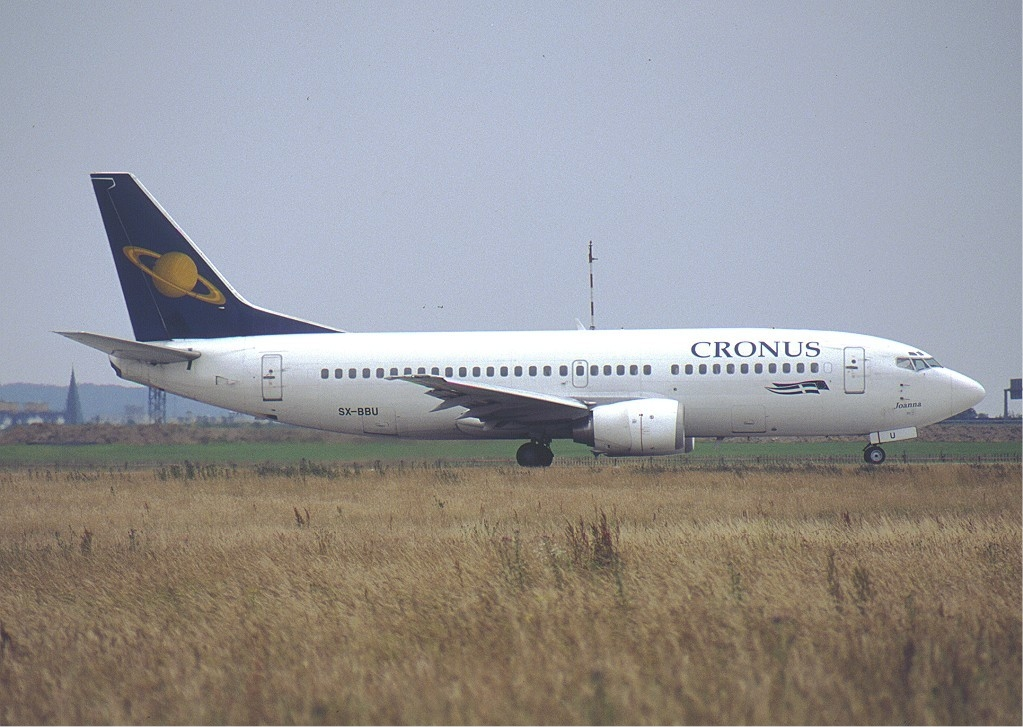
A Cronus Airlines Boeing 737-300 in 1997.

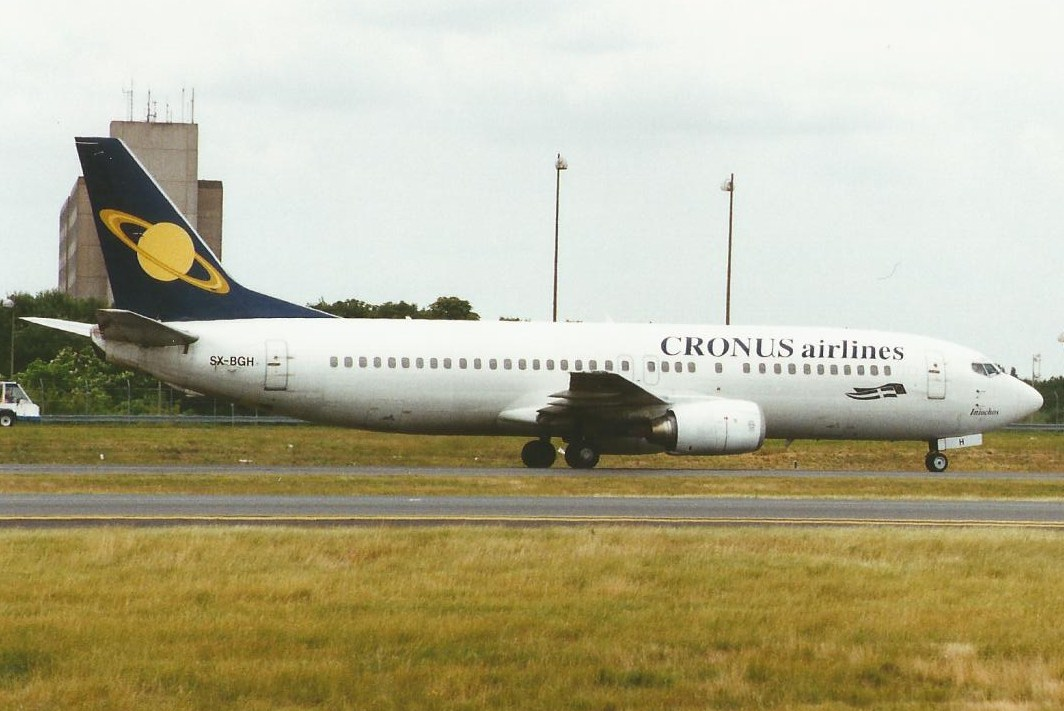
A Cronus Airlines Boeing 737-400 in 2000.

The historical fleet of Cronus Airlines is detailed below:

Historic Fleet
Total	Aircraft	Introduced	Retired	Notes
Boeing 737-300	4	1995	2001	The airline started operations in 1995 using a leased Boeing 737-300.
Boeing 737-400	2	1998	2001	Introduced later to increase capacity on busier routes. Merged into Aegean Airlines in 2001.

== See also ==
- Aegean Airlines
