= Richard Godolphin Long =

English banker and Tory politician

Richard Godolphin Long (2 October 1761 – 1 July 1835) was an English banker and Tory politician.

== Life and career ==
Baptised at West Lavington, Wiltshire a month after his birth, he was the son of Richard Long (died 1787) and his wife Meliora, descendant of Sir John Lambe.

By 1800, Long was a partner in the Melksham Bank, together with his younger brother John Long, John Awdry and Thomas Bruges. In 1799, he purchased Steeple Ashton Manor House and farm, which remained in the family until 1967, and commissioned architect Jeffry Wyattville to build Rood Ashton House nearby in 1808.

He was appointed High Sheriff of Wiltshire for 1794. Long entered the House of Commons in 1806, sitting for Wiltshire until 1818. He was the founder of the Royal Wiltshire Yeomanry.

== Family ==
On 28 March 1786, he married Florentina Wrey, third daughter of Sir Bourchier Wrey, 6th Baronet, and had by her four daughters and two sons. After a lingering illness Long died aged 73, at Rood Ashton House, six weeks after his wife, and was interred in the family's crypt at St Mary's Church, Steeple Ashton. Their children included:

- Walter (1793–1867), the eldest son, was also a member of parliament, representing North Wiltshire
- Ellen, the eldest daughter, married John Walmesley in 1812; their children included Richard Walmesley (1816–1893), a lawyer and latterly owner of Lucknam Park, Wiltshire
- Florentina (Flora), having been previously engaged to Henry Cobbe (uncle of Frances Power Cobbe), who had died the day before the proposed marriage, formed a strong attachment to the then-elderly poet George Crabbe. Flora and her aunts were frequent visitors of novelist Jane Austen, who referred to Flora as her 'cousin', though their exact relationship is not known. Austen never met Crabbe, but nursed a fantasy of becoming his wife.

== Notes ==
Parliament of the United Kingdom
Preceded by Henry Penruddocke Wyndham; Ambrose Goddard	Member of Parliament for Wiltshire; 1806–1818; With: Henry Penruddocke Wyndham 1806–1812; Paul Methuen 1812–1818	Succeeded by William Pole-Tylney-Long-Wellesley; Paul Methuen
