= Lucknam Park =

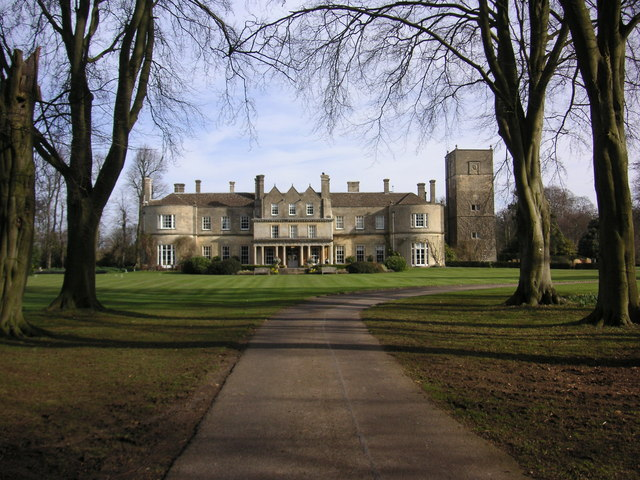
- Lucknam Park in March 2007

Restaurant information
- Rating: 1 Michelin star
- City: Colerne (Wilts), nr. Bath
- Country: England
- Coordinates: 51°27′22″N 2°15′22″W
- Website: www.lucknampark.co.uk

Lucknam Park is a luxury hotel, spa and restaurant in west Wiltshire, England, about 3 miles (5 km) north-west of Corsham and 7 miles (11 km) north-east of Bath. The core of its building is a Grade II listed country house built in the late 17th or early 18th century. The hotel's restaurant has held one star in the Michelin Guide since 2006.

== House ==
A farm on the site, about 1 mile (1.6 km) north of Colerne village, was bought in 1688 by James Wallis, a wealthy Trowbridge cloth manufacturer who had also purchased the nearby manors of North Wraxall and Biddestone. He began construction of the mansion which was probably completed by his son Ezekiel. The property later had a succession of owners, including the Methuen family in the late 18th century and the Walmesley family from 1870 to 1918. John Walmesley (c.1775–1873) of Preston, Lancashire married Ellen, daughter of Richard Godolphin Long of Rood Ashton House, Wiltshire; their son Richard (1816–1893), lawyer and JP, is described as "of Lucknam".

The two-storey Wallis house forms the three-bay centre of the present building. In 1827 it was bought by Andreas Boode (1763–1844), a Dutch-British owner of plantations in Demerara which used enslaved labour. He had the house re-fronted in ashlar, with a ground-floor loggia having four pairs of Doric columns, and greatly enlarged it by adding two-storey wings on both sides: each has three bays and is terminated by a two-storey bowed pavilion. The resulting facade is described by Orbach as "impressively long".

The whole was remodelled in 1919–20 for Sir Alfred Read, chairman of Coast Lines, the UK's largest coastal shipping company. The central part was given a three-gabled attic and tall chimneys in Jacobean style, and the rear front and interiors were remodelled. Pevsner called the Jacobean work an "excresence", but in Orbach's 2021 updating it is merely "spurious".

To one side a tall square late-19th-century water tower rises higher than the house. Formerly turreted, its flat parapet and corner urns result from changes designed in 1937 by Oswald Brakspear.

The house was designated as Grade II listed in 1960.

== Hotel ==
The house was bought in 1987 and opened as a hotel the next year by Lucknam Park Hotels Ltd. The company directors are members of the Laskaridis family, who own Greek shipping companies and hotels in Greece and elsewhere. Facilities include a spa and an equestrian centre.

== Associated buildings ==
The stables range with two-storey coach house, built of rubble stone in 1834 for J. C. Boode, forms a courtyard with the rear of the house. A 19th-century octagonal dovecote in the kitchen garden is described by Historic England as exceptionally large and of an unusually late date.

The lodge at the north entrance to the estate was built in 1854 in Italianate style: a substantial stone archway is flanked by a two-storey lodge on one side and a taller campanile tower on the other. Middle Lodge, near the main house, was designed in neo-Regency style by Oswald Brakspear.
