= Air Greece =

Greek airline (1994–1999)

IATA	ICAO	Call sign
JG	AGJ	AIR GREECE
- Founded: November 26, 1991
- Hubs: Heraklion
- Focus cities: Athens, Thessaloniki, Rhodes
- Fleet size: 5
- Destinations: 12
- Parent company: Aegean Airlines
- Headquarters: Heraklion, Greece
- Key people: Kostas Mpantouvas (Chairman, CEO)

Air Greece was an airline based in Heraklion, Greece. It was one of the first private airlines to operate scheduled domestic flights in Greece.

== Code data ==
- IATA Code: JG
- ICAO Code: AGJ
- Callsign: Air Greece

== History ==
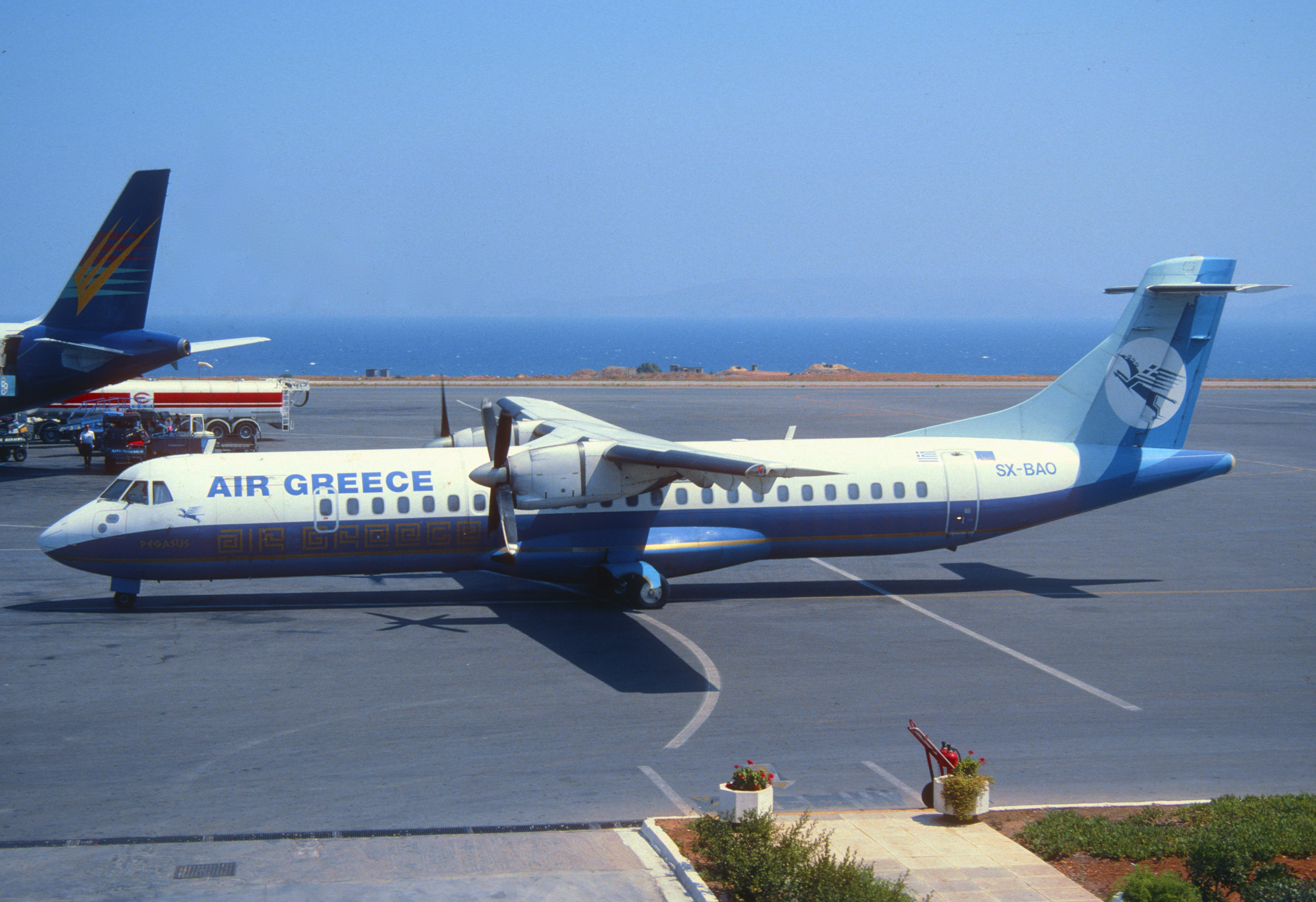
Air Greece ATR-72 at Heraklion airport.

Air Greece was established in 1994 by Cretan businessmen and started operations in the same year using two leased ATR 72 turboprops on domestic routes. In April 1997 a third ATR 72 was added to the fleet, followed by the lease of two Fokker 100s in May and June 1999. Delivery of the Fokkers marked the international expansion of the company and new routes to destinations in Germany were opened.

In 1999, passenger ferry company Minoan Lines acquired a 51% stake in Air Greece. However, at that time Air Greece was facing strong competition from Aegean Airlines, Cronus Airlines and Olympic Airways, forcing it to begin a cooperation with Aegean which ended in a full takeover by Aegean in December 1999. During 2000, Air Greece's original owners made an unsuccessful attempt to launch Cretan Airways as its successor.

== Services ==
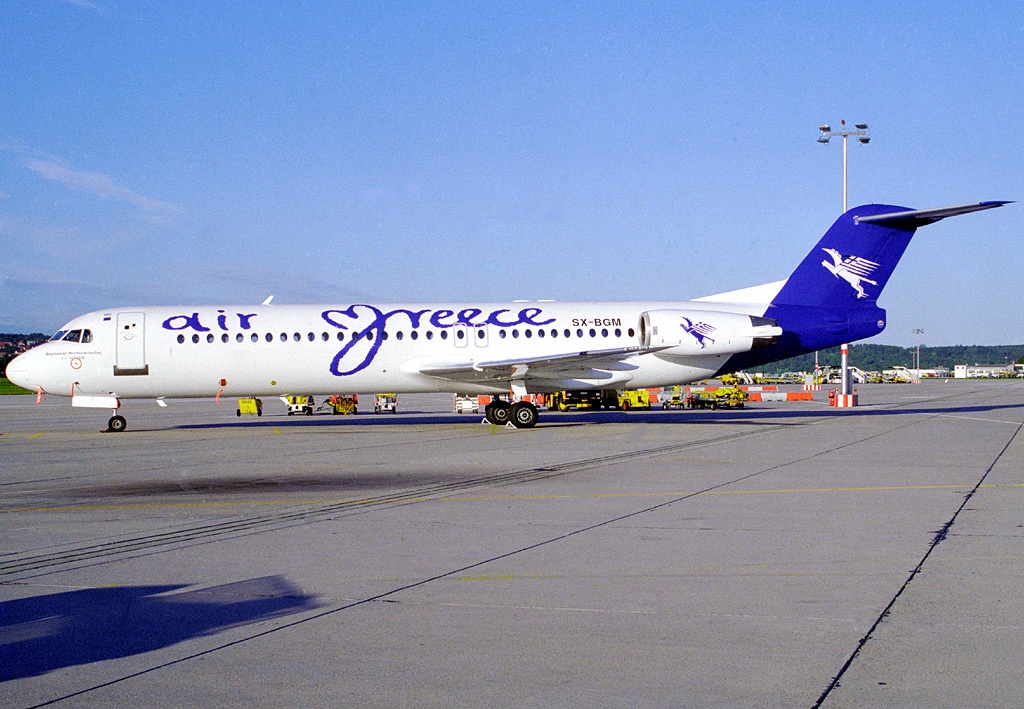
Air Greece Fokker 100 at Stuttgart airport.

Air Greece operated scheduled services from/to the following cities:

- Athens, Thessaloniki, Heraklion, Rhodes, Chania, Corfu, Santorini, Araxos, Kavala, Mytilene, and Ioannina.

International destinations:

- Cologne, Stuttgart and Düsseldorf.

== Fleet ==
The fleet of Air Greece consisted of the following aircraft:

- 3 ATR 72 turboprops. (SX-BAO (c/n 326), SX-BAP (c/n 330), SX-BFK (c/n 313)
- 2 Fokker 100 jets. (SX-BGL (c/n 11387), SX-BGM (c/n 11476)
