= Ashton Common =

Hamlet in Wiltshire, England

Coordinates: 51.323°N 02.148°W

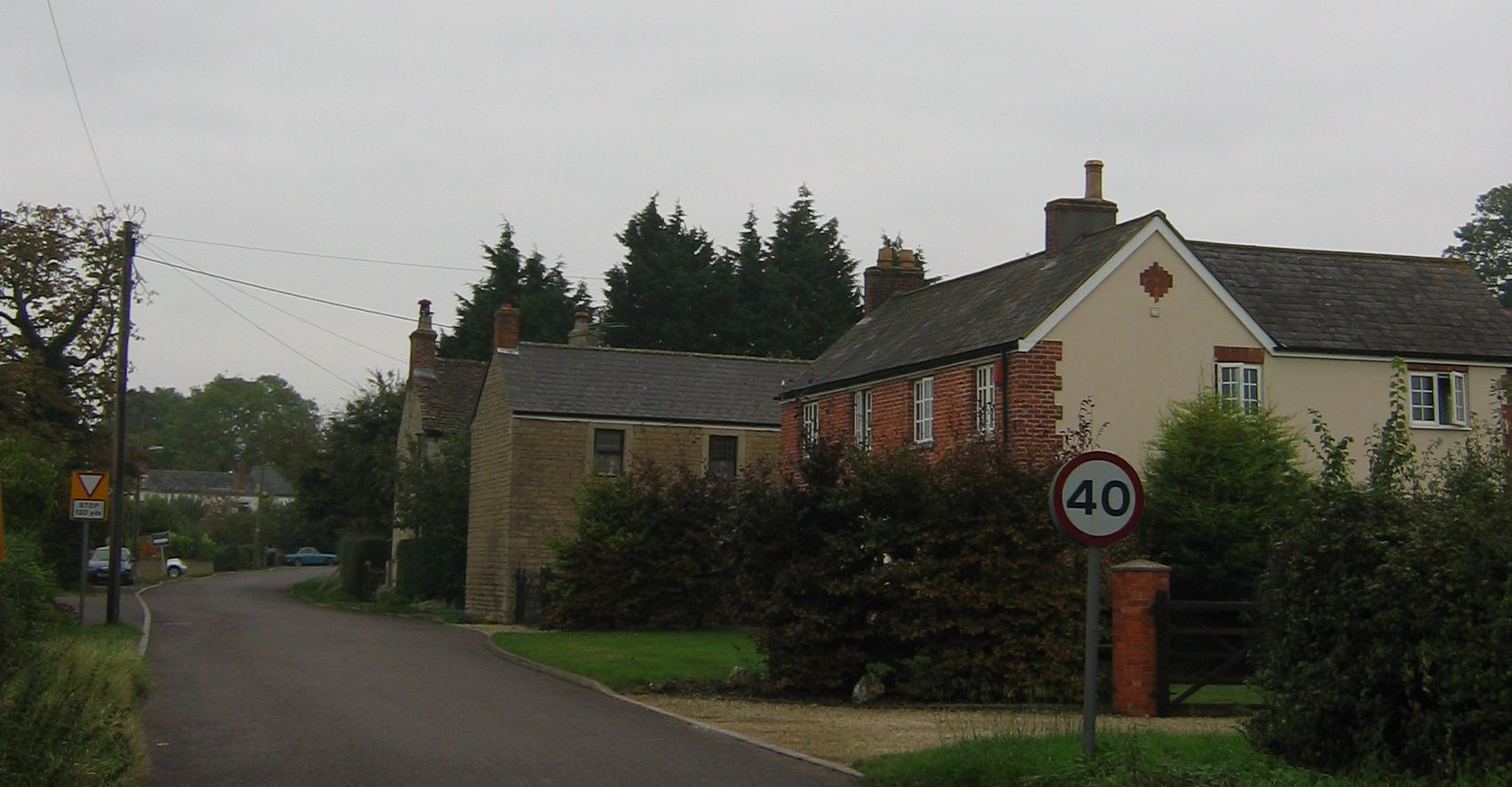
- Main road

- Location within Wiltshire
- OS grid reference: ST898582
- Civil parish: Steeple Ashton
- Unitary authority: Wiltshire
- Ceremonial county: Wiltshire
- Region: South West
- Country: England
- Sovereign state: United Kingdom
- Post town: TROWBRIDGE
- Postcode district: BA14
- Police: Wiltshire
- Fire: Dorset and Wiltshire
- Ambulance: South Western
- UK Parliament: Melksham and Devizes

Ashton Common is a hamlet in Wiltshire, England, to the east of Trowbridge. The hamlet lies on Common Hill, a little south of the A350 road, within the civil parish of Steeple Ashton.
