= Henry Carpenter (priest) =

Canon of Windsor (1606–1662)

Henry Carpenter D.D. (1606–1662) was a Canon of Windsor for a short period in 1662.

== Career ==
He was educated at Exeter College, Oxford where he graduated Bachelor of Arts in 1624, and was conferred Doctor of Divinity in 1662.

He was appointed:

- Vicar of Holy Trinity Church, Coventry (1633–1636)
- Rector of Greatford, Lincolnshire (1635–1636)
- Vicar of Steeple Ashton, Wiltshire (1636–1660)
- Rector of Hilperton, Wiltshire (1638–1662)
- Chaplain to the Speaker of the House of Commons (1660)
- Prebendary of Yetminster in Salisbury Cathedral (1660)
- Rector of St Dionis Backchurch, London (1661–1662)
- Rector of Stapleford Tawney, Essex (1661–1662)

He was appointed to the seventh stall in St George's Chapel, Windsor Castle in 1662.
