= Whorwellsdown Hundred =

Coordinates: 51.32°N 2.14°W

Whorwellsdown was a hundred of the English county of Wiltshire, lying in the west of the county to the south of the towns of Bradford on Avon and Melksham and to the north and east of Westbury. An arm of the hundred reached several miles southwards into Salisbury Plain, with a detached portion, a tithing of Tilshead, lying high on the Plain about five miles east of the southern arm of the rest of the hundred. At its western end, it reached as far as the Somerset county boundary.

== Extent ==
At the time of the Domesday Book (1086), the hundred contained Romsey Abbey's manors of Steeple Ashton and Edington, together with other estates at Edington, Coulston, Keevil, and Tilshead. Steeple Ashton then included West Ashton, North Bradley and Southwick.

In 1831, the hundred included Steeple Ashton (with West Ashton), North Bradley, East Coulston, Edington, Keevil, and the tithing of South Tilshead.

== Lordship ==
The lordship of the hundred may have been included in King Edgar's grant of Steeple Ashton to Romsey Abbey, as in the 13th century the abbesses of Romsey claimed they held it by a gift of Edgar. However, King Henry I granted the hundred to the abbey subject to an annual rent of forty shillings to the sheriff of Wiltshire, a grant later confirmed by King Stephen, so it is also possible that the first grant to the Abbey was by Henry I. The hundred and the holding of its court remained with the abbey until 1538, when the dissolution of the monasteries intervened and they passed to the Crown. In 1547, the hundred was granted to Edward Seymour, 1st Duke of Somerset. Following his attainder, the hundred returned to the Crown, and in 1565 it was granted to Humphrey Skelton and Nicholas Holbourne. By the end of the 16th century it was in the ownership of the Paulets, lords of the Edington manor of Edington Romsey.

Apart from their privileges in the hundred's courts, the lords of the hundred also had a number of rights in woods and commons.

== Hundred court ==
The earliest surviving records of proceedings in the hundred court date from 1261 and 1262. Matters presented by each of the tithings include hue and cry, bloodshed, and disputes between parties about such matters as debt and breach of contract. In the 13th century, the abbesses of Romsey held a hundred court every three weeks, but between 1412 and 1538, when the final abbess's court was held, there was a great decline in business. The court continued to be held by later owners. By the end of the 16th century the two constables for the hundred were appointed by the Quarter Sessions, and Tithingmen were still appearing to make their presentments in the 18th century.

When the hundred court was granted to Romsey Abbey by Henry I, he granted "all pleas belonging to it". However, what belonged to the court was uncertain. In 1233 litigation ensued between the Abbey and Ela, Countess of Salisbury, the sheriff, over the extent of the Abbey's jurisdiction, and the abbess was forced to recognise the sheriff's right to two 'tourns' a year, to include all pleas of the Crown, the view of frankpledge, disputes about beasts taken against pledge, and assizes of bread and ale. The abbey thus retained actions for debt, pleas of battery and medley where there was no allegation of felony, actions over the injury of cattle and horses, and other matters where there was no king's writ. The Abbey later agreed to pay an additional rent to acquire some of the sheriff's rights, so that in 1289 its rent was £4, but the sheriffs continued to hold their two tourns in the hundred court until the 16th century.

In 1708, the hundred court was held at Tinhead. Apart from Keevil, all the tithings of 1261 were still attending the court in the 18th century.

== Origin and survival of the name ==
Whorwellsdown was originally the name of a low hill near Crosswelldown Farm, at the point where the ancient parishes of Steeple Ashton, Edington, and Bratton meet. Early records show that the hundred court was held there under an oak or thorn tree.

The hundred shared a Poor Law Union with neighbouring Westbury, a single Westbury and Whorwellsdown Union Workhouse being located at Eden Vale, Westbury, with accommodation for some 134 people.

The name of Whorwellsdown remained in everyday use in Wiltshire into the 21st century to mean the wider area of the hundred. From 1872 to 1934 the name was part of that of the Westbury and Whorwellsdown Rural District. Up to the 1960s there was also a petty-sessional division called Whorwellsdown. Until the end of Wiltshire County Council in 2009, one of the council's electoral divisions was called 'Whorwellsdown' or 'Whorwellsdown Hundred'. Despite these continuing uses, by the late 20th century there was no consistency about the local pronunciation of the name.
