= Thanasis Laskaridis =

Greek shipowner (born 1952)

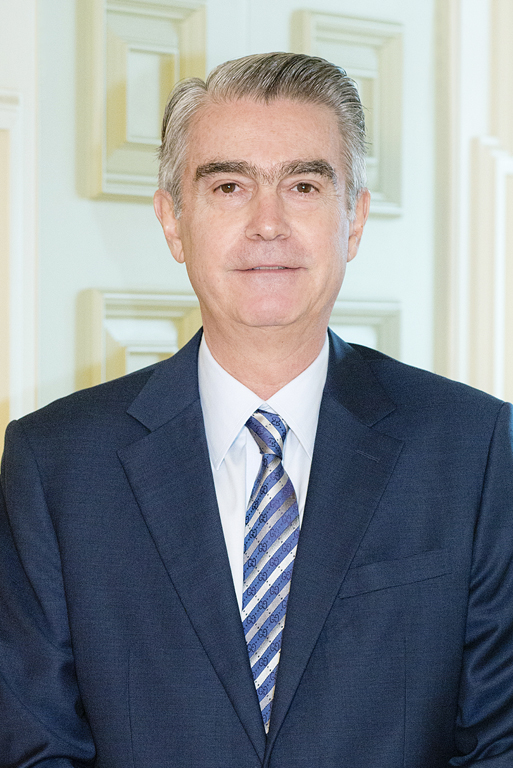
- Thanasis Laskaridis in 2017
- Born: Athanasios Laskaridis; 8 November 1952 (age 73); Athens, Greece
- Occupation: Businessman
- Years active: 1974 –
- Known for: Former President and CEO of Lavinia Corporation
- Children: 6
- Parent(s): Konstantinos Laskaridis; Kaiti Laskaridis

Thanasis Laskaridis (Greek: Θανάσης Λασκαρίδης; born 8 November 1952) is a Greek shipowner and businessman based in the United Kingdom. He was president and CEO of Lavinia Corporation from 1977 until 2021. He is also founder of the Athanasios C. Laskaridis Charitable Foundation, The People's Trust in Greece, and co-founder of the Aikaterini Laskaridis Foundation, along with his brother Panos. He has six children.

== Biography ==
=== Early life and education ===
He was born in Athens, Greece, to Konstantinos (Constantine) and Aikaterini (Kaiti) Laskaridis and has one older brother, Panos Laskaridis. He graduated from the German School of Athens in 1970 and went on to receive a Bachelor's degree in electrical engineering at Aston University of Birmingham in 1973. He then completed a Master's degree in systems engineering at Imperial College London in 1974 and went on to complete a second Master's degree in Economics and Finance at the London School of Economics in 1975.

=== Business interests ===
During the mid-1970s he started his career in shipping by taking control of the small family fishing company along with his brother. The brothers became the majority shareholders of Lavinia Corporation, a shipping group holding company that controls Laskaridis Shipping, an Athens-based management firm founded in 1977, which operates reefer ships, petroleum tankers, dry bulk carriers, ship repair facilities, and marine terminals.

In January 2021, Thanasis Laskaridis sold his majority stake in Lavinia Corporation, reorganizing the family's asset holdings. He kept control of the ship repair facilities and marine terminals, and created a new shipping-related group under Alimia/Laskaridis Maritime.

His business activities also span across the hospitality, real estate, and airline industries (as a minority shareholder in Aegean Airlines). After the intra-family reorganization in 2021, Thanasis has the substantial majority ownership and control of Lampsa Hellenic Hotels SA, owner of the landmark Athens hotels Grande Bretagne, King George and Athens Capital, as well as the Hyatt Regency Belgrade. He also owns Lucknam Park, a countryside hotel in the UK.

=== Charity and donations ===
In 1993, the Laskaridis brothers founded the Aikaterini Laskaridis Foundation in memory of their mother. The foundation's aim is to actively support cultural and educational projects in Greece. Laskaridis and his brother have donated to causes such as the Hellenic Coast Guard, the Greek navy, the Union of Greek Shipowners' charitable trust, fresh water supply projects for refugees in northern Greece and a number of Greek charitable organisations engaged with the wellbeing of children in need. Laskaridis has also donated to the London School of Economics in support of the Hellenic Observatory, where he sits on the Advisory Board.

In 2014, he financed with €1.5 million the restoration of Syntagma Square, the central square of Athens that had been damaged during riots and vandalism in previous years. The mayor of Athens, Giorgos Kaminis, unveiled a plaque in his honour in September 2018, for Laskaridis' contribution to the square.

Thanasis Laskaridis is also the founder of The People's Trust in Greece, a charitable trust dedicated to small grants for startup companies and general charity.

For his donations to the Greek Navy and coast guard, Laskaridis has been awarded by the Ministry of Shipping and Island Policy and the Hellenic Coast Guard. He is also an honorary member of the latter organisation.

In 2016, Thanasis Laskaridis founded the A.C. Laskaridis Charitable Foundation (ACLCF), a non-profit organisation which aims to build partnerships and implement programmes that focus on the environment and education in Greece. As part of these efforts, in 2019 the MV Typhoon, a former platform supply vessel that was converted into a special purpose ship, began operations in the Greek seas with the aim of contributing to the large scale clean-up of the coastline, as well as to research of coastal and in-water marine pollution, in cooperation with universities and research institutions. In 2020, the ACLCF initiated a joint effort with the Greek government to plan the campaign "Greece Without Disposable Plastics", which aims to significantly reduce the volume of disposable plastics used in the country.
