= West Ashton =

Village in Wiltshire, England

Coordinates: 51.300°N 02.175°W

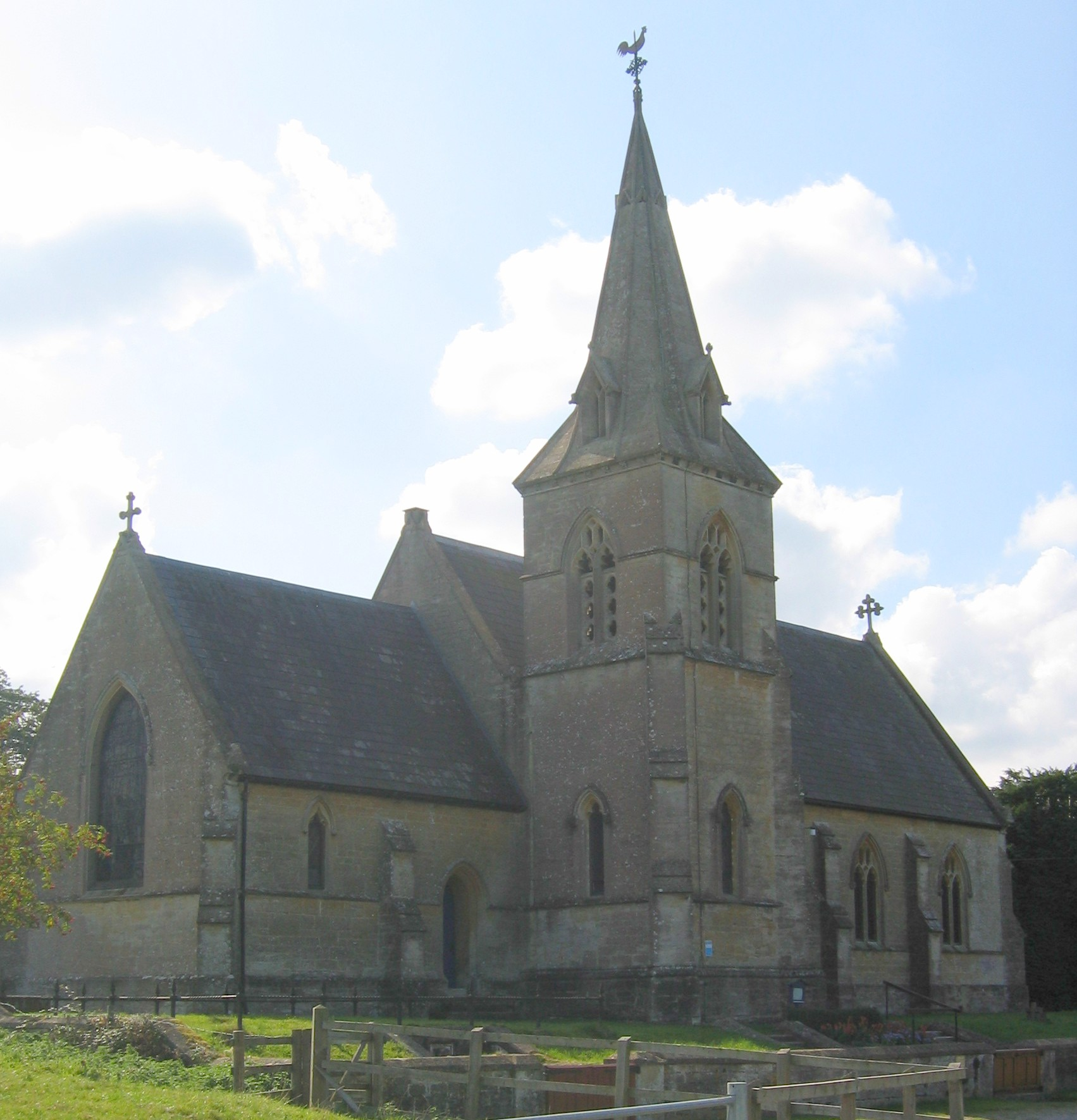
- Parish church of St John the Evangelist

- Location within Wiltshire
- Population: 737 (2011 census)
- OS grid reference: ST879557
- Civil parish: West Ashton
- Unitary authority: Wiltshire
- Ceremonial county: Wiltshire
- Region: South West
- Country: England
- Sovereign state: United Kingdom
- Post town: Trowbridge
- Postcode district: BA14
- Dialling code: 01225
- Police: Wiltshire
- Fire: Dorset and Wiltshire
- Ambulance: South Western
- UK Parliament: South West Wiltshire
- Website: Parish Council

West Ashton is a village and civil parish in Wiltshire, England. It is about 2 miles (3.2 km) southeast of Trowbridge, near the A350 between Melksham and Yarnbrook which bypasses Trowbridge. The parish includes the hamlets of Dunge (grid reference ST 892 544), East Town (ST 893 557) and Rood Ashton (ST 886 560).

West Ashton was anciently a tithing – alongside Great Hinton and Semington – of the large Steeple Ashton parish, within the hundred of Whorwellsdown. These tithings became separate civil parishes in the late 19th century.

The village has a primary school, West Ashton Church of England Primary School, and a village hall.

== Parish church ==
The Anglican Church of St John the Evangelist was built in 1846 to designs of T.H. Wyatt with funding from Walter Long. Its east window is a 1920 war memorial, which Pevsner states is the work of Henry Payne. In 1988 the church was designated as Grade II listed. It has the family crypt and monuments to the Long family of Rood Ashton House.

An ecclesiastical parish was created for the church at some point. From 1962 and again from 1964, the parish was held in plurality with Heywood. In 1982 the benefice was united with St Thomas, Trowbridge and today is part of a group ministry which also includes Holy Trinity Church, Trowbridge.

== Rood Ashton House ==
Rood Ashton House was a country house that had belonged for two centuries to the Long family. In February 1930, the house and 4,100 acres (17 km^{2}) estate were put up for auction by Lord Long's executors, six years after his death. The estates were bought by a syndicate of his tenants, and in the 1960s the house was sold again. The new owner stripped the house of its assets, removing the lead roofing, internal panelling and fireplaces, and leaving it a roofless shell. The north wing is the only surviving part of the house, and is a Grade II listed building.

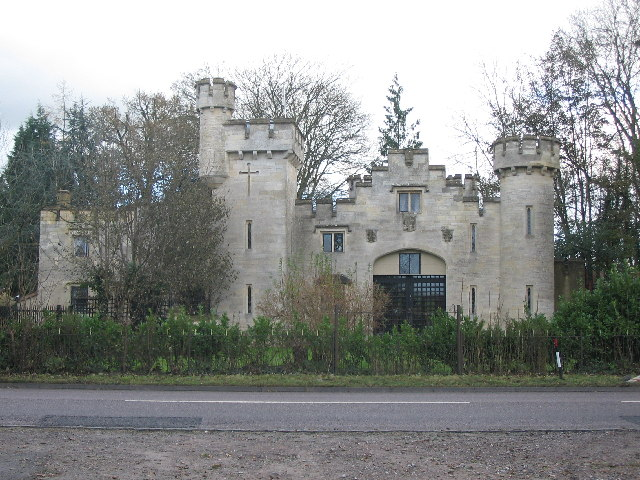
Long's Park Castle

To the north of the village on the A350 is the folly known as Long's Park Castle, originally a lodge for Rood Ashton House. It is now used as holiday accommodation.
