= Richard Walmesley =

English lawyer and cricketer (1816–1893)

Personal information
- Full name: Richard Walmesley
- Born: 30 July 1816; Bath, Somerset, England
- Died: 26 May 1893 (aged 76); Chippenham, Gloucestershire, England
- Batting: Unknown
- Role: Wicket-keeper

Domestic team information
- Years: Team
- 1836: Cambridge University

Career statistics
Competition	First-class
Matches	1
Runs scored	3
Batting average	3.00
100s/50s	–/–
Top score	2*
Catches/stumpings	–/1
- Source: Cricinfo, 25 January 2023

Richard Walmesley (30 July 1816 – 26 May 1893) was an English lawyer and a cricketer who appeared in a single first-class cricket match for Cambridge University in 1836.

== Life ==
The son of John Walmesley (d. 1860) of Ince, Preston and his second wife Ellen Long (daughter of Wiltshire landowner Richard Godolphin Long), Walmesley was born at Bath. He was educated at Winchester College and from 1835 at St John's College, Cambridge. He graduated with a Bachelor of Arts degree in 1839, which converted automatically to a Master of Arts in 1842.

Walmesley became a lawyer, being called to the bar in 1842 and specialising in equity draughtsmanship and conveyancing. Around 1870, he acquired the Lucknam Park estate and became a justice of the peace for Wiltshire.

== Cricket ==
Walmesley was in the cricket eleven at Winchester as a middle-order batsman, but in the 1836 Cambridge trial match, he batted at No 11, though he still managed to be the team's top-scorer in the second innings, with 13 not out. His sole first-class match, the game against the Cambridge Town Club, followed less than two weeks later, and he scored 1 and 2 not out, batting at No 8; he played no further matches.

== Family and death ==
In 1849 Walmesley married Ann Eliza Donaldson, daughter of the late William Donaldson of Lyttleton House, Blandford. The couple had one son, John.

Richard Walmesley died at Lucknam Park on 26 May 1893. His tomb-chest inside Colerne parish church has his effigy in marble, wearing a nightshirt and holding a bible, and is described by Pevsner as "very realistic". He is further commemorated by a tall stone column in the centre of the village's market place.
