= George Webb (bishop) =

Anglican bishop (1581–1642)

George Webb (1581–22 June 1642) was an Anglican bishop in Ireland during the first half of the Seventeenth century.

Webb was born in Wiltshire and educated at University College, Oxford. He was Vicar of Steeple Ashton then SS. Peter & Paul, Bath. He was Chaplain-in-Ordinary to King Charles I, who nominated him as Bishop of Limerick on 6 October 1634; his son Theophilus took his place at the Bath church.

Works by Webb include The Practice of Quietness.

He died of dysentery in Limerick Castle (King John's Castle) on 22 June 1642 during the siege of the castle, by the Irish troops of Garret Barry. The local Protestant population, including the bishop, had sought refuge in the castle following an armed uprising and were besieged there without supplies for some four weeks. Webb died two days before the Protestants capitulated and his body was carried out and hastily buried at the local church of St Munchin.
