= Haymarket Post Office =

Heritage-listed building in Sydney, Australia

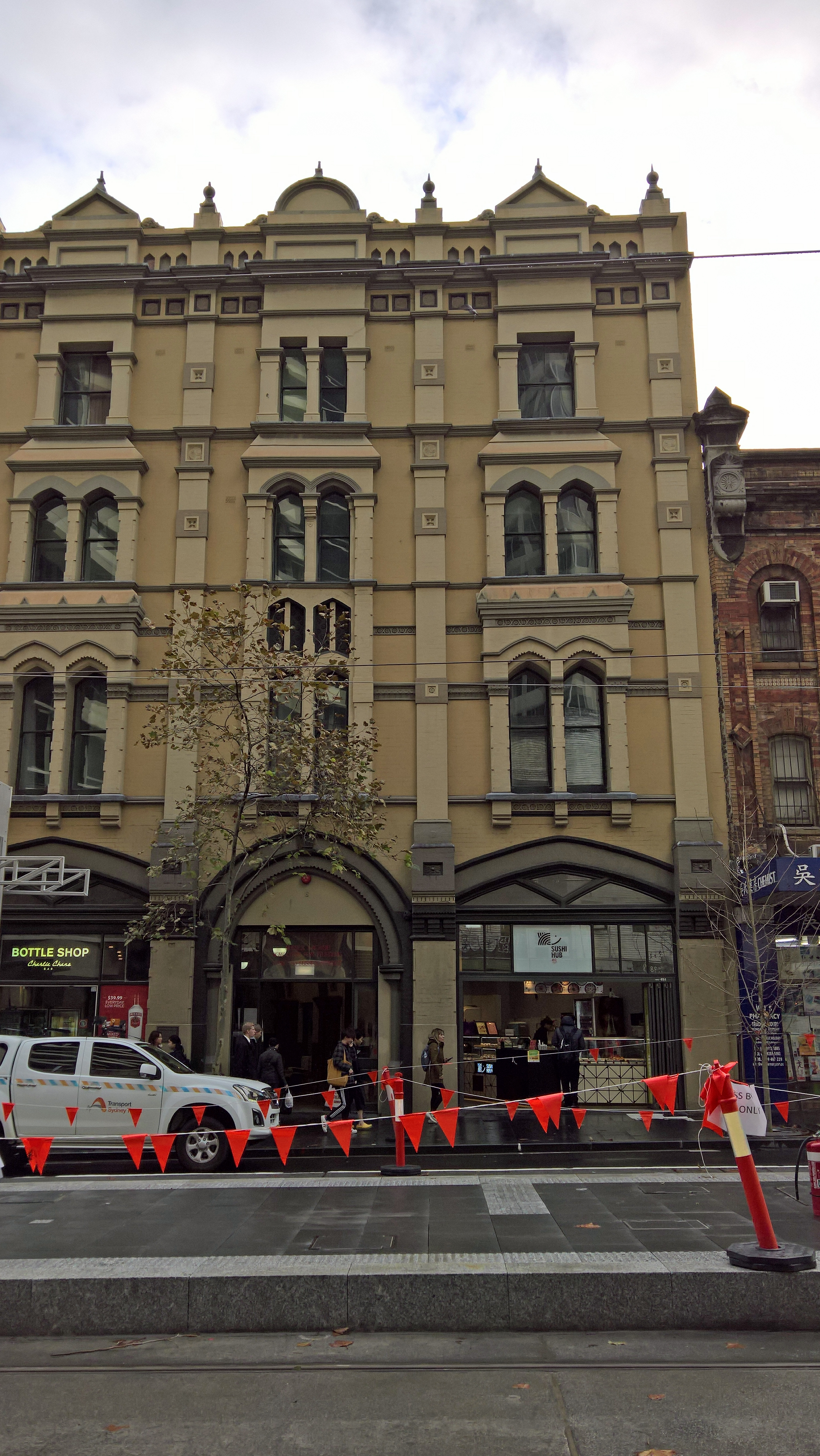
- Haymarket Post Office, 633–635 George Street, Sydney

- Location within Sydney Location within Australia
- 33.8784°S 151.2052°E
- Location: 633–635 George Street, Sydney, City of Sydney, New South Wales, Australia

History
- Built: 1927–1928

Site notes
- Architect: E. Henderson

New South Wales Heritage Register
- Official name: King George Hotel (former) and Haymarket Post Office
- Type: state heritage (complex / group)
- Designated: 2 April 1999
- Reference no.: 615
- Type: Post Office
- Category: Postal and Telecommunications
- Builders: H. W. Thompson Ltd

Haymarket Post Office is a heritage-listed former post office at 633–635 George Street, Sydney, New South Wales, Australia. It was designed by E. Henderson and built from 1927 to 1928 by H. W. Thompson Ltd. It was added to the New South Wales State Heritage Register on 2 April 1999.

== History ==
The site of the Haymarket Post Office was originally granted to John Dickson and James Blanch on 8 March 1831. The land was transferred to Michael McMahon in July 1889. 635 George Street was the Mercantile Hotel, later the British Lion Hotel. Number 633 had a number of commercial tenancies. McMahon died in 1904 and the land was transferred to his three sons and Robert David Lewers, who sold to Sydney grocer John Francis Ashwood.

The Australian Government had been seeking land for a post office in the Haymarket area since 1909. No offers were forthcoming from notices in the Commonwealth Gazette, so the government took possession of 633–635 George Street under the Lands Acquisition Act 1906 in 1912. The three shops on the site continued to operate, with various tenants, until they were demolished in 1926.

Plans for the new post office were drawn up in 1924 by E. Henderson, principal designing architect for the national government, but underwent some modifications so construction did not begin until 1927. George Oakeshott was the works director and E. Henderson the supervising architect. The builder was H.W. Thompson Ltd. The post office opened in 1928 and was managed by postmaster J. F. Fountain.

The first complaints regarding the building occurred in 1932, when problems with the lift occurred due to overloading and misuse. Two years later, partitions were erected on the third floor to allow the space to be used by tenants M. S. Regal. In 1939 M. S. Regal made way for the Wireless Branch of the Posts and Telegraphs Department while the new General Post Office was being completed.

Alterations were undertaken in 1932 to remove partitions on the first and third floors for the use of the radio inspector and staff. In 1936 alterations were made to the private boxes.

The Post Office was designed with the intention of leasing parts of the upper storeys to tenants. There seems to initially have been difficulty finding tenants, but the Chinese Consulate General occupied the second floor from 1932 until 1973, when the consul seems to have closed.

Space restrictions at the General Post Office forced the relocation of the engineering section of the Postmaster Generals Department to Haymarket in 1944. By 1946, other than the Chinese Consulate General, all floors were occupied by postal and telegraphic services. Postal demands continued to put pressure on the building and after lengthy negotiations 631 George Street, formerly the George Hotel, was purchased for the telephones department and incorporated into the post office building.

The Post Office was offered for sale in 1991 under a government policy to sell a proportion of its post office buildings. The buildings have changed hands several times since their sale.

== Description ==
The former Post Office is a five-story building in the Interwar Free Classical Style. The facade is divided into three bays and includes rectangular portals around the ground floor entries. The windows on the first, second and third floors are recessed into arches. Bronze spandrels separate the second and third floors, while the third and fourth are separated by a cornice. The windows are formed of steel casements with hopper toplights. The flat roof is interrupted by a large lightwell on the south side, which originally provided light to the ground floor postal hall and still gives light to the upper floors.

The internal arrangements allow for public space on the ground floor with offices on the first, second and third floors. The fourth floor is occupied by a small flat. The lift is located in the northeast corner of the building and is encircled by a terrazzo staircase. Storage is provided for in a small basement, lit by concrete framed pavement light.

The building is constructed of reinforced concrete and exposed concrete beams. The original steel windows are still extant, as are many of the polished timber high waisted doors. The decorative wall render survives in places, but the original marble finishes and most of the original joinery has been removed.

The flat on the fourth floor is largely extant, except for the kitchen.

=== Modifications and dates ===
- 1927 Construction of new post office to the design of E. Henderson
- 1932 Partitions in first and third floor
- 1934 Partitions dividing rear tenancy on third floor
- 1935 Additional private boxes
- 1938 Wire guard over main skylight
- 1948–51 Openings and stairs connecting to 631 George Street
- 1993 Bar and gaming room fit out on ground floor

== Heritage listing ==
The Haymarket Post Office, built in 1927 to the design of E. Henderson and George Okenshott, is of State significance as the only substantial post office built in the interwar period in the inner city area of Sydney. It is a fine example of the Interwar Free Classical style and is believed to be the only example of this style applied to a post office. The original postal hall survives, although without fittings, and is one of very few such surviving.

Haymarket Post Office was listed on the New South Wales State Heritage Register on 2 April 1999, having satisfied the following criteria.

The place is important in demonstrating the course, or pattern, of cultural or natural history in New South Wales.

The Haymarket Post Office is of local significance in demonstrating the importance of Haymarket as a commercial area in inner Sydney. It is of further significance in relation to information regarding the provision of accommodation in the fourth floor flat for post office staff.

The place has a strong or special association with a person, or group of persons, of importance of cultural or natural history of New South Wales's history.

It is of local significance for its associations with E. Henderson, the principle designing architect of the Commonwealth Architect's Office.

The place is important in demonstrating aesthetic characteristics and/or a high degree of creative or technical achievement in New South Wales.

The Post Office is of State significance as the only Interwar Free Classical post office building in New South Wales. E. Henderson's use of the classical proportions, massing, feature arches, bronze panelling and cast iron grilles is a fine interpretation of the architectural style.

The place has a strong or special association with a particular community or cultural group in New South Wales for social, cultural or spiritual reasons.

The building has a strong association with the Chinese community as the offices of the Chinese Consulate General in Australia for 40 years from 1929 to 1973. The consulate's location in Haymarket demonstrates the area as a focus of the Chinese community during this period.

The place has potential to yield information that will contribute to an understanding of the cultural or natural history of New South Wales.

The site is of State significance. The early development of the area and the development of the site indicate there is a high probability of archaeological remains of the early use of the area.

The place possesses uncommon, rare or endangered aspects of the cultural or natural history of New South Wales.

The Post Office is of State significance as a grand example of an interwar post office and the only built in the Free Classical style.

The lift is an intact example of an open style lift with brass mesh panels set in polished timber. The postal hall is one of very few such surviving spaces.

The place is important in demonstrating the principal characteristics of a class of cultural or natural places/environments in New South Wales.

It is of State significance as a fine representative example of a civic building in the Interwar Free Classical style.

It is also of State significance as being representative of the overall growth of postal and telegraph departments between World War I and World War II. The spread of the services into the adjacent hotel demonstrates the expanding roles of the Departments.
