= George Hotel, Sydney =

Heritage-listed building in Sydney, Australia

George Hotel
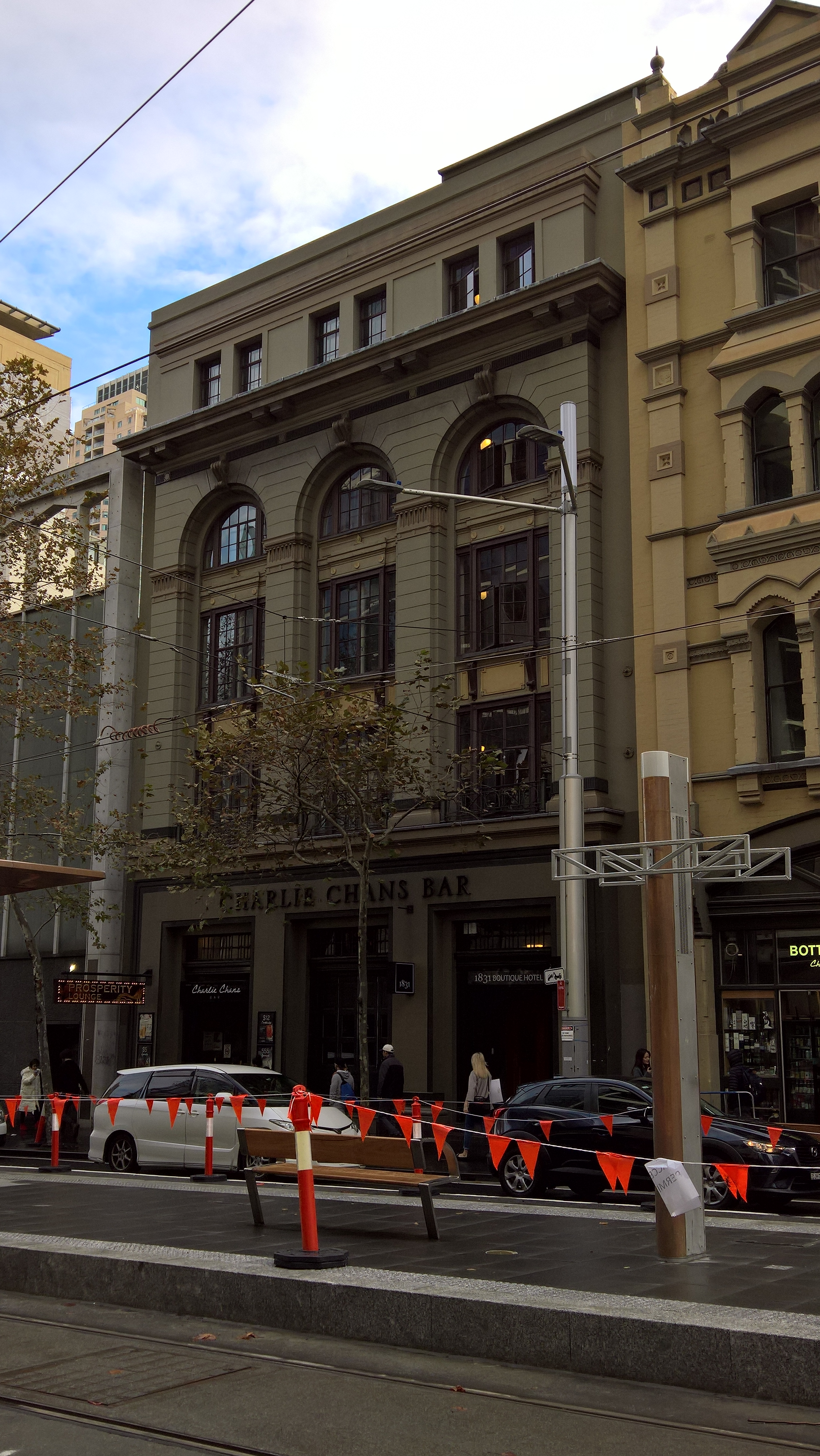
- George Hotel, 631 George Street, Sydney is a former hotel

- Location within Sydney Location within Australia
- 33.8784°S 151.2052°E
- Location: 631 George Street, Sydney, Australia

New South Wales Heritage Register
- Official name: King George Hotel (former) and Haymarket Post Office
- Type: state heritage (complex / group)
- Designated: 2 April 1999
- Reference no.: 615

George Hotel is a heritage-listed former hotel at 631 George Street, Sydney, Australia. It was added to the New South Wales State Heritage Register on 2 April 1999.

== History ==
Two separate land grants for 631–635 George Street were issued in 1831. The first was to John Dickson with the second grant to James Blanch on the same day of 8 March 1831. By 1866, Patrick and Mary O'Dowd had purchased land that consisted of both Dickson's' and Davis' grants. In 1880, Mary died and what is now known as 631 George Street, Haymarket, was left to her husband and her brother, and they in turn leased it out to George Barr, who then setup the Haymarket Music Hall. In 1891, the site was then signed over to 'St Joseph's Investment and Building Society' which with the cooperation of O'Dowd, created plans to add an extra two storeys to the building (original construction date unknown). There is evidence that this extension may actually be the current 631 George street site. The original building was only designed for two storeys and it can be seen there are significant interior design differences between the lower and upper floors. Examples include the columns in the central wing and plaster mouldings and detailing to arches around the lobbies.

There were constant changes to the owners and occupiers of the building. In 1898 it was known as the Crescent Hotel and its proprietor was Jeffery Monfries. 1899 saw it renamed the Crescent Hotel and Coffee Palace, with proprietor John Eggleton. Between 1907 and 1916 it was known once again as the Crescent Hotel and had five different proprietors.

In 1921, renovations were underway to include a shop tenancy on the ground floor. The reason for this was mainly due to the decline in business for pubs due to the government restriction of 6 pm closures.

On 18 December 1924 a sublease to Tooheys Limited occurred and another name change. The building was now renamed the George Hotel. The name of George was probably after the moustached man who was the company logo from 1894. During this time, many renovations continued in an attempt to provide better airflow and fresher air into the building as well as more light and better use of the small rooms.

In 1939, Tooheys Limited purchased the hotel, and had plans approved to completely rebuild the hotel to a new modern design by Coperman Lemont and Keesing. This was approved by the licensing board but work never commenced. In 1940 an application was approved to delicence the majority of the building. Those affected included the whole of the west wing, the south side of the central wing on the first floor, all of the central wing of the second floor and the entire third floor. In 1941, Tooheys transferred their hotel licence to the New Elizabeth Hotel.

The following year Tooheys offered the building to Sydney City Council for amenities. The Church Life and Work Committee of the Presbyterian Church (NSW) were looking for a location for a Hospitality Centre for servicemen and leased the building for one pound a year. Extensive work must have been undertaken at this time to make the building habitable. Volunteers staffed the centre, which offered 120 beds, full meals, recreation rooms, information, chapel, showers and an ironing and mending facility. British servicemen were particularly attracted to the homely quality of the centre. The end of the war, in conjunction with increasing operating costs, lead to the closure of the centre in 1946. After a failed auction an agreement was reached with St Vincent de Paul, who hoped to provide shelter to the homeless. The Commonwealth, however, intervened in 1948 to acquire the property to allow for the expansion of the neighbouring Haymarket Post Office.

Since it was sold in 1993 by Australia Post, it remains vacant except for a retail arcade through 631 George Street.

== Description ==
Externally 631 George Street is a four-storey high building of face brickwork. Facing east, towards George Street, is a parapeted facade of the Victorian Free Gothic Style. This side is substantially intact and features decorative brickwork and low pointed arches. Much of this detail has been obscured however, by paint. Windows are framed from timber and with the rise of each level, they decrease in size. Shopfronts on the ground floor have been largely altered. The wall to the north of the building is original at east end and the west end of the wall was rebuilt in the 1950s using steel windows with the west wall being rebuilt in the 1940s with possible use of materials from elsewhere in the building. The post office obscures the south wall of the building; however, it is believed that many original windows to the west would be surviving within that wall. Other than the ground floor shops, much of the building is in poor condition.

== Heritage listing ==
The George Hotel, which reached its present form c. 1892, is a fine, example of a Victorian free gothic style hotel building surviving in the inner city area of Sydney. The facade is largely intact and features an exuberant use of face brickwork. The general layout and character of the main rooms of the hotel, including the fine timber stair, are reasonably intact.

George Hotel was listed on the New South Wales State Heritage Register on 2 April 1999 having satisfied the following criteria.

The place is important in demonstrating the course, or pattern, of cultural or natural history in New South Wales.

The former George Hotel is of local significance as a surviving late Victorian hotel building in the inner city area built at a time when the hotel industry was enjoying high prosperity.

The place has a strong or special association with a person, or group of persons, of importance of cultural or natural history of New South Wales's history.

The former George Hotel is of local significance for its associations with Tooheys Limited, one of Australia's oldest brewing companies.

The place is important in demonstrating aesthetic characteristics and/or a high degree of creative or technical achievement in New South Wales.

The former George Hotel is of local significance as a fine example of the Victorian free gothic style, as applied to a commercial building.

The place has a strong or special association with a particular community or cultural group in New South Wales for social, cultural or spiritual reasons.

The former George Hotel is of local significance for its associations with the work of the Presbyterian Church (NSW) and servicemen during World War II.

The place has potential to yield information that will contribute to an understanding of the cultural or natural history of New South Wales.

The site is of State significance. The early development of the area and the development of the site indicate there is a high probability of archaeological remains of the early use of the area.

The place is important in demonstrating the principal characteristics of a class of cultural or natural places/environments in New South Wales.

The former George Hotel is of local significance as a fine representative example of a city hotel in the Victorian free gothic style.
