= Steeple Ashton =

Village in Wiltshire, England

Coordinates: 51.311°N 02.135°W

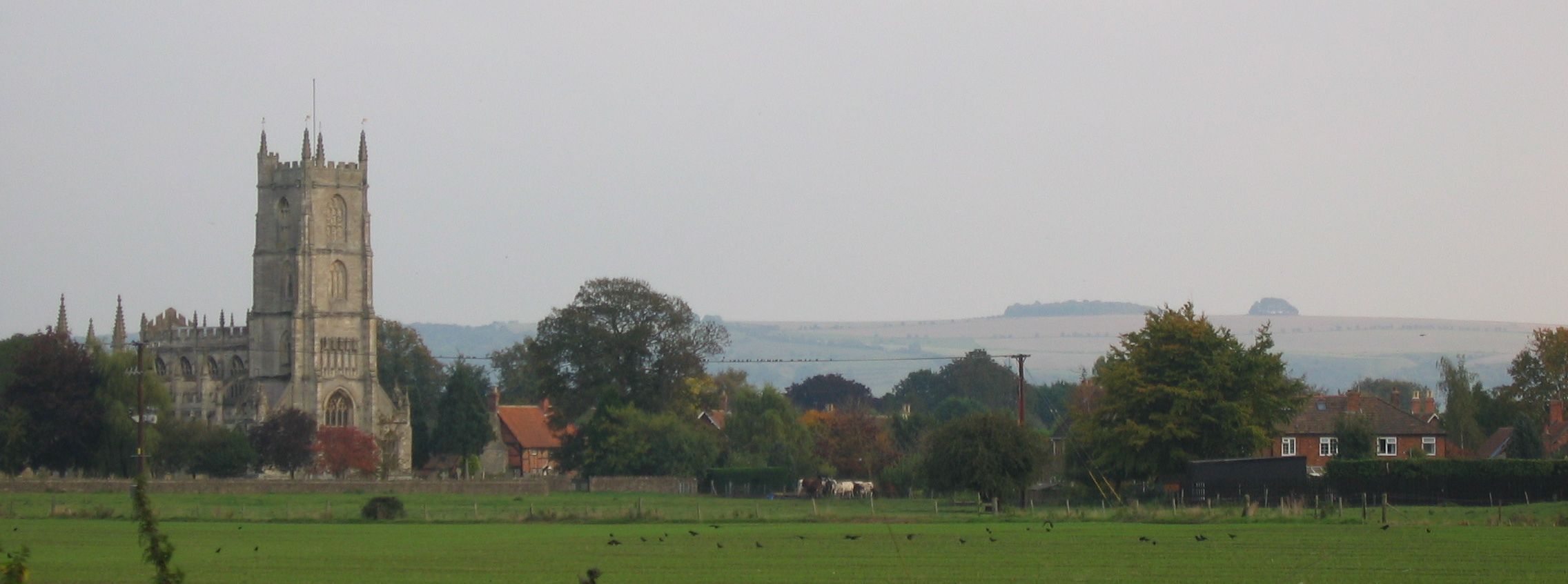
- The village, seen from across a field

- Location within Wiltshire
- Population: 1,221 (in 2021)
- OS grid reference: ST907569
- Unitary authority: Wiltshire
- Ceremonial county: Wiltshire
- Region: South West
- Country: England
- Sovereign state: United Kingdom
- Post town: TROWBRIDGE
- Postcode district: BA14
- Dialling code: 01380
- Police: Wiltshire
- Fire: Dorset and Wiltshire
- Ambulance: South Western
- UK Parliament: Melksham and Devizes
- Website: Parish Council

Steeple Ashton is a village and civil parish in Wiltshire, England, 3 miles (4.8 km) east of Trowbridge. In 2021 the parish had a population of 1221.

In the north of the parish are the hamlets of Ashton Common and Bullenhill.

== Name and history ==
Until the Dissolution of the Monasteries, Steeple Ashton was a manor of Romsey Abbey, at the centre of the abbey's large estates in the area. It was also part of the hundred of Whorwellsdown, and was the site of the hundred's courts.

The first element of the village's name derives from the former steeple of the church built c. 1480–1500, which, when it was measured in 1606, was found to be 32 yards higher than the tower, making together the remarkable height of about 186ft. An inscription in the church records that the spire was struck by lightning in July 1670, and, just as repairs were being completed, struck again the following October. Two men working on it were killed, and the body of the church severely damaged, so that no attempt to rebuild the spire was made. Steeple Ashton was once a market town, having been granted a weekly market in 1266; a market cross (dated 1679) still stands on the village green.

In the early 16th century, possibly in 1503, a great fire affected the cloth industry within the small town, and when it came to rebuilding they moved to the nearby town of Trowbridge, where the River Biss provided power for fulling mills. The business of the market then moved to neighbouring towns such as Market Lavington.

The road through the village, connecting Edington in the southeast to Trowbridge in the northwest, formed part of a route from Salisbury which fell out of use in the later 18th century.

In 1818 the parish extended north and west to include Great Hinton, Semington (with Littleton), and West Ashton. In the late 19th century separate civil parishes were created for each of those three areas, greatly reducing the area of Steeple Ashton parish.

The parish had 955 inhabitants in 1991, half the number it had in 1981. This was due to the parish boundary of Trowbridge being adjusted to include new housing estates which had been built at the edge of the town but within the parish of Steeple Ashton. By 2021, the parish population had increased to 1,221.

== Religious sites ==
=== Parish church ===
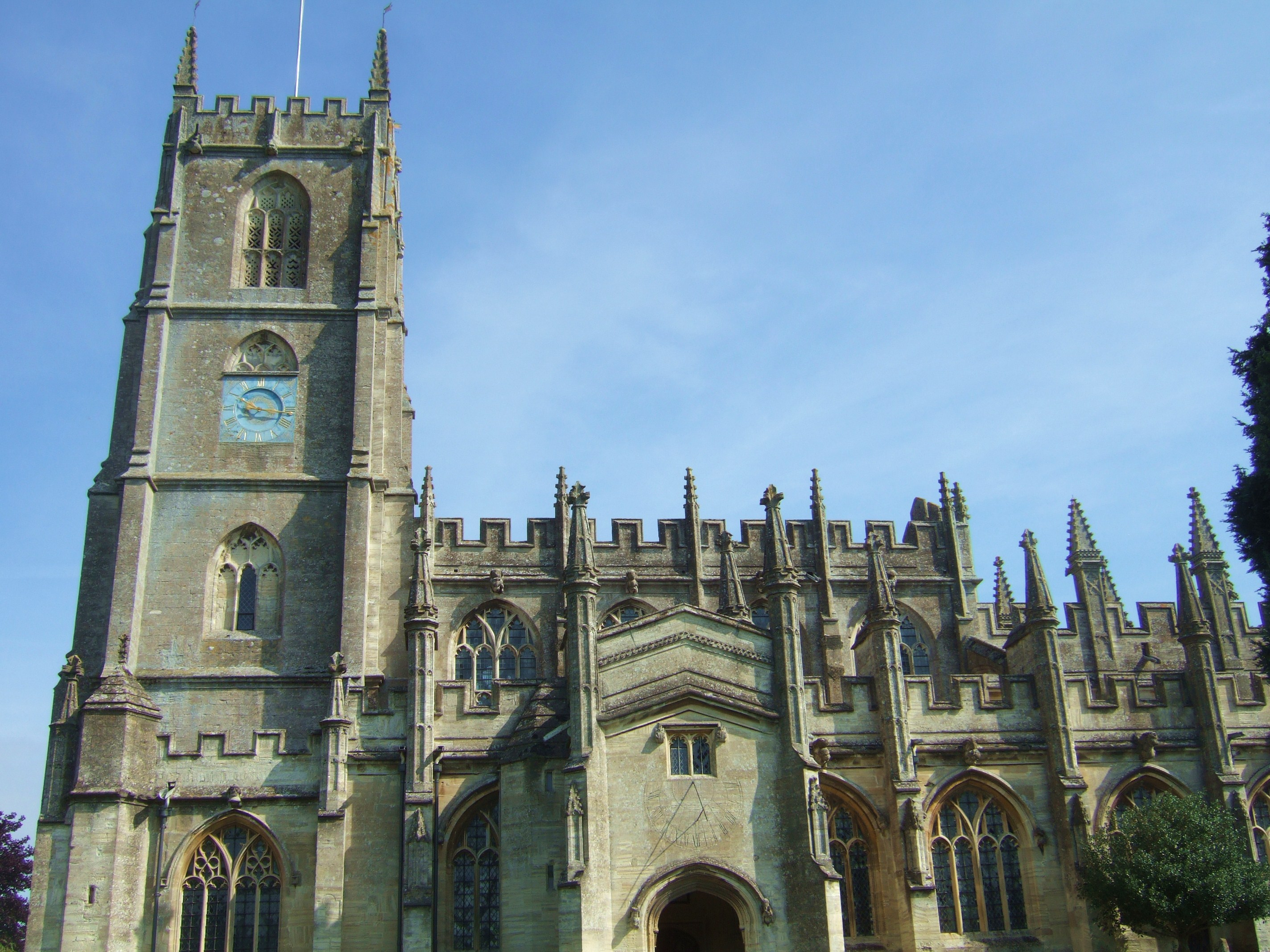
Church of St Mary the Virgin

Historic England describe the parish church of St Mary as "One of the finest Perpendicular churches in the country, its wealth coming from Steeple Ashton's woollen industry". Pevsner writes that the church "fairly bristles with pinnacles – a gay and fantastical sight".

There was already a long-standing church at Steeple Ashton in 1252, held by Romsey Abbey, a link which remained in place until the dissolution. The present church, in limestone ashlar with a four-stage west tower, is a rebuilding in the late 15th century; the north aisle at the cost of Robert Long (d. 1501) and the south at the cost of Walter Lucas (d. 1495), both clothiers. The tower – which may have been built in the early 15th century – was surmounted by a stone spire, 93 feet (28 m) high, making a total height of about 186 feet (57 m), the second highest in Wiltshire after Salisbury Cathedral. The spire was struck by lightning in July 1670, repaired, then struck again in October, damaging the nave and aisles as it fell; it was not replaced. The chancel of the pre-15th century church was retained until it was rebuilt in 1853, taller and slightly longer, by Henry Clutton.

On the south side of the tower is a 19th-century clock face, driven by an earlier clock, which may be the one recorded in 1543. All six bells were recast in 1959.

Inside, the nave has an unusual oak lierne vault roof, although its supports indicate an intention to build in stone, as was done in the aisle roofs. Fittings, including the font, are from the 19th century. Windows of the aisles and Lady Chapel incorporate fragments of medieval glass, from windows said to have been broken in the Civil War.

==== Notable vicars ====
- 1605 – 1636: George Webb, author of The Practice of Quietness, later Bishop of Limerick
- 1636 – 1660: Henry Carpenter, later a Canon of Windsor
- 1787 – 1828: Samuel Hey, previously a fellow and tutor at Magdalene College, Cambridge, who left the parish his personal library of around 175 books. The collection grew under the care of later vicars to over a thousand volumes, but was reduced in size during the Second World War; in 1965 there were some 250. When the vicarage was sold c. 1969, the collection was transferred to the parvise above the church porch, now known as the Samuel Hey Library.

==== Parish ====
Soon after the church of St John the Evangelist was built at West Ashton tithing in 1846, an ecclesiastical district was created for it. The parish boundaries were further altered in 1954, when an area was transferred to Trowbridge and another area (south of the Devizes branch line) was transferred from Melksham.

St George's church at Semington was anciently a chapelry of Steeple Ashton, and the parish name was Steeple Ashton with Semington until 2000, when Semington became an independent parish. Today, Steeple Ashton parish is part of the benefice of North Bradley, Southwick, and Heywood.

=== Chapels ===
Baptists met from 1825, and in 1864 a house on the green was taken over as a chapel, which closed around 1940.

Mormonism flourished after 1844, and by 1851 a congregation of about 50 were meeting at a house. Several groups emigrated to America in that century.

A Primitive Methodist chapel was built in the village in 1854 and refurbished in 1991. It remains in use as a Methodist church.

== Amenities ==
There is a village hall and a village shop staffed by volunteers.

The Longs Arms public house, in the centre of the village, was built c. 1700 and extended in the late 19th century. It is named for the Long family of West Ashton, who owned much of Steeple Ashton until 1930.

A National School was provided in 1828 by the Long family. In 1941 senior pupils were transferred to schools in Trowbridge and the school continued as St. Mary's Church of England VA Primary School. The school closed in 2003 and most children transferred to Keevil school.

== Buildings and landmarks ==
The manor house, northeast of the church, was built in 1647 for the Bennett family, in brick with a three-gabled limestone ashlar front. The house and its estate was bought in 1799 by Richard Long of Rood Ashton, and remained in the Long family until the 1970s, the last owners being Richard Long, 4th Viscount Long (1929–2017) and his first wife Margaret (1928–2016). In 1968 the house and its late-17th century former granary were recorded as Grade II* listed.

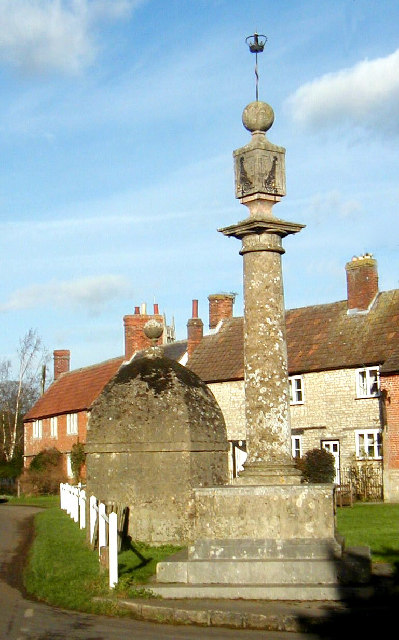
Market cross and lock-up, on the village green

The Listing indicated that many modifications were made to the manor in the 20th century. The manor was offered for sale in mid 2020, after being upgraded over the previous decade; for example, an atrium was added, "linking the main body of the house to an adjoining courtyard", according to Country Life. Amenities included three reception rooms, six bedrooms and two bath/shower rooms.

Five other houses in the parish are Grade II* listed, including Ashton House (c. 1400) and Black Barn Cottage (15th century).

On the small village green are a 1679 market cross in the form of a Tuscan column carrying a sundial and a ball finial, and an 18th-century village lock-up.

A war memorial in the form of a cross stands on the High Street, and in the churchyard is a small green village pump manufactured by Lee Howl. Elsewhere, three 1930s gas petrol pumps remain at a disused George Moore petrol station, with a further, more skeletal gas pump in a gated area behind.

== Keevil Airfield ==
The village abuts Keevil Airfield, a former Royal Air Force station which served during World War Two as home to squadrons of the United States Army Air Forces, and later as a launch site for gliders taking part in the Normandy invasion of France and Operation Market Garden. As of 2018, the airfield was still used occasionally "for military purposes and large training exercises", according to the Royal Air Force.

These days, there is a Gliding club (Bannerdown Gliding Club) at the airfield. The club is affiliated with RAF Brize Norton.

== SSSI ==
Fields to the south-east of Steeple Ashton, at grid reference ST 914558, contain a bed of Jurassic coral limestone. A 26.5-hectare (65-acre) geological Site of Special Scientific Interest was notified here in 1998.
