= Aegean Airlines =

National airline of Greece

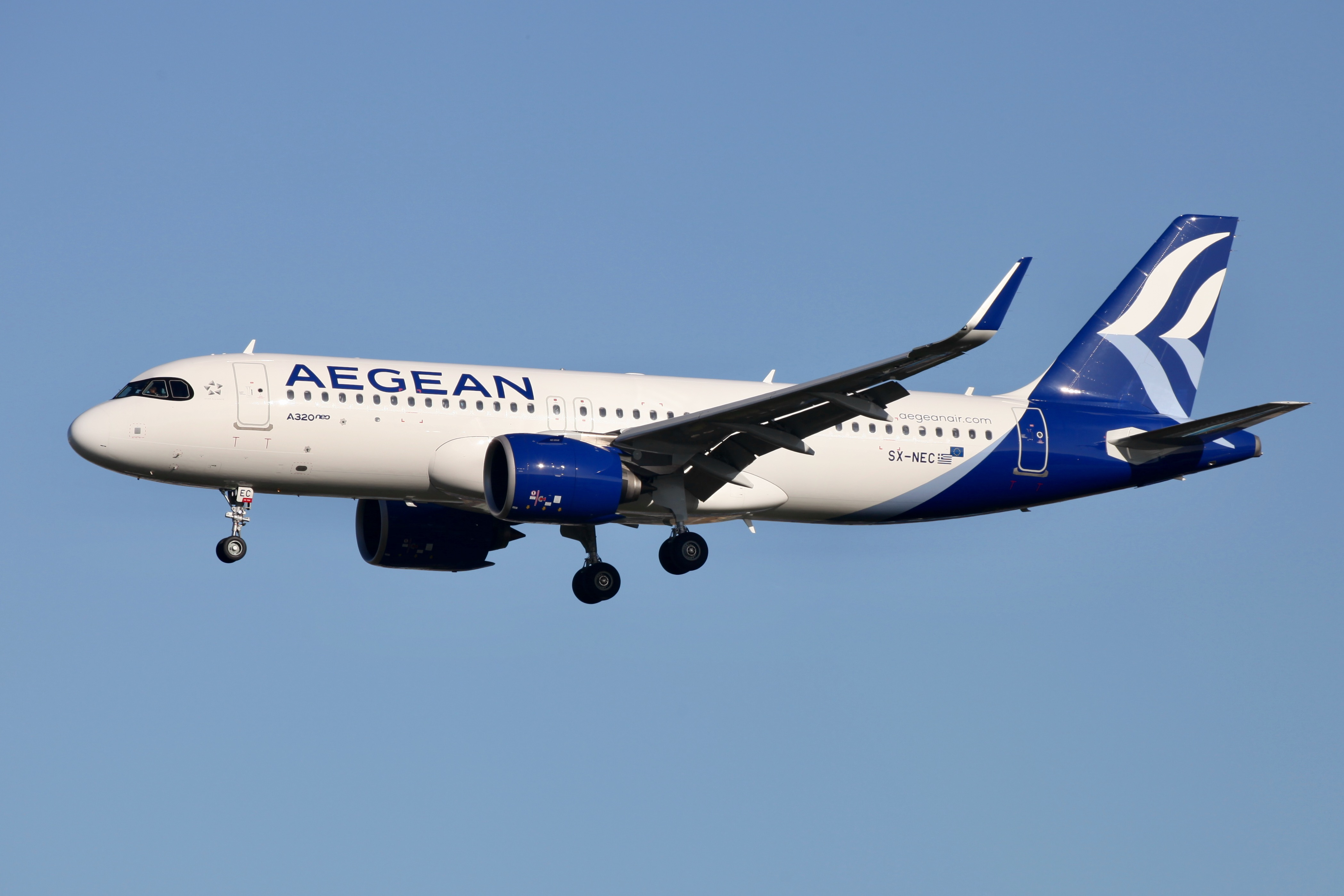
- An Aegean Airlines Airbus A320neo
IATA	ICAO	Call sign
A3	AEE	AEGEAN
- Founded: 2 January 1995; 31 years ago
- Commenced operations: May 1999; 27 years ago
- AOC #: GR-007
- Hubs: Athens; Thessaloniki
- Secondary hubs: Chania; Heraklion; Kalamata; Larnaca; Rhodes
- Frequent-flyer program: Miles+Bonus
- Alliance: Star Alliance
- Subsidiaries: Olympic Air
- Fleet size: 72
- Destinations: 118
- Traded as: Athex: AEGN
- ISIN: GRS495003006
- Headquarters: Spata, Greece
- Key people: Michalis Kouveliotis (CEO); Eftichios Vassilakis (Chairman)
- Revenue: ▲€1.86 billion (FY 2025)
- Operating income: ▼€218.2 million (FY 2025)
- Net income: ▲€148 million (FY 2025)
- Total assets: ▲€3.213 billion (FY 2025)
- Total equity: ▲€568.8 million (FY 2025)
- Employees: 3,131
- Website: aegeanair.com

Aegean Airlines S.A. (Greek: Αεροπορία Αιγαίου Α.Ε., Aeroporía Aigaíou pronounced [aeropoˈria eˈʝeu]) is the flag carrier of Greece and the largest Greek airline by total number of passengers carried, by number of destinations served, and by fleet size. A Star Alliance member since June 2010, it operates scheduled and charter services from Athens and Thessaloniki to other major Greek, European, Middle Eastern, African and Indian destinations. Its main hubs are Athens International Airport in Athens, Macedonia International Airport in Thessaloniki and Larnaca International Airport in Cyprus. It also uses other Greek airports as bases, some of which are seasonal. It has its head office in Athens International Airport, building 57.

On 21 October 2012, Aegean Airlines announced that it had struck a deal to acquire Olympic Air, and the buyout was approved by the European Commission a year later, on 9 October 2013. Both carriers continue to operate under separate brands. In addition, Aegean Airlines participated in the final stages of the tender for the privatization of Cyprus Airways, the national carrier of Cyprus. Following the bankruptcy of Cyprus Airways, Aegean Airlines established a hub at Larnaca Airport, thus initiating scheduled flights to and from the island to various destinations and filling the service gap created by the services termination of Cyprus Airways.

== History ==
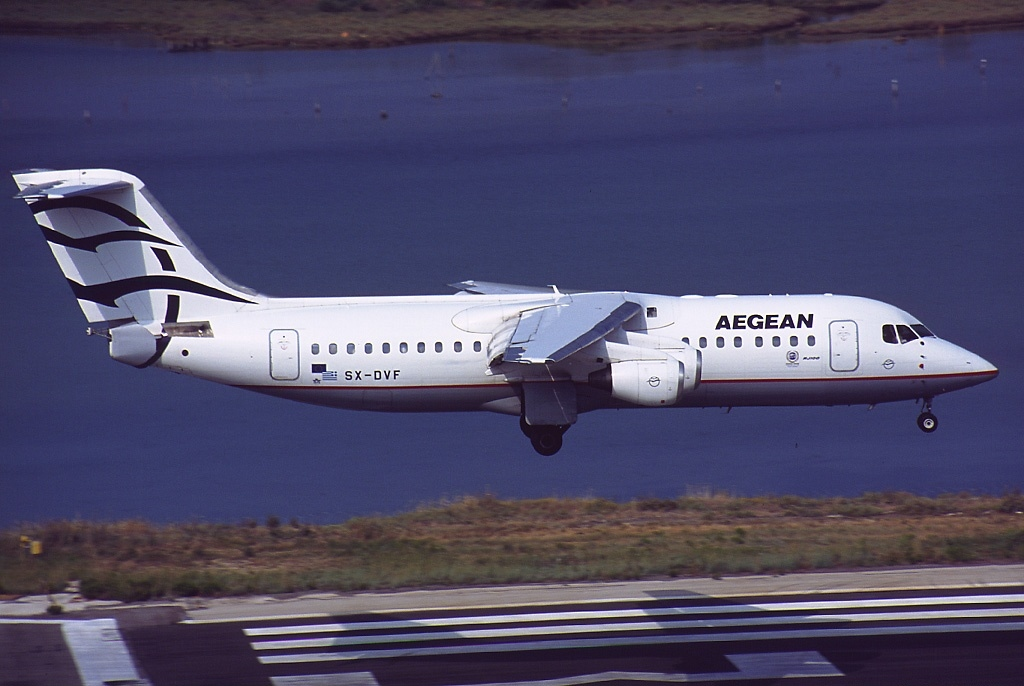
Aegean Airlines used BAe Avro RJ100s between 1999 and 2011

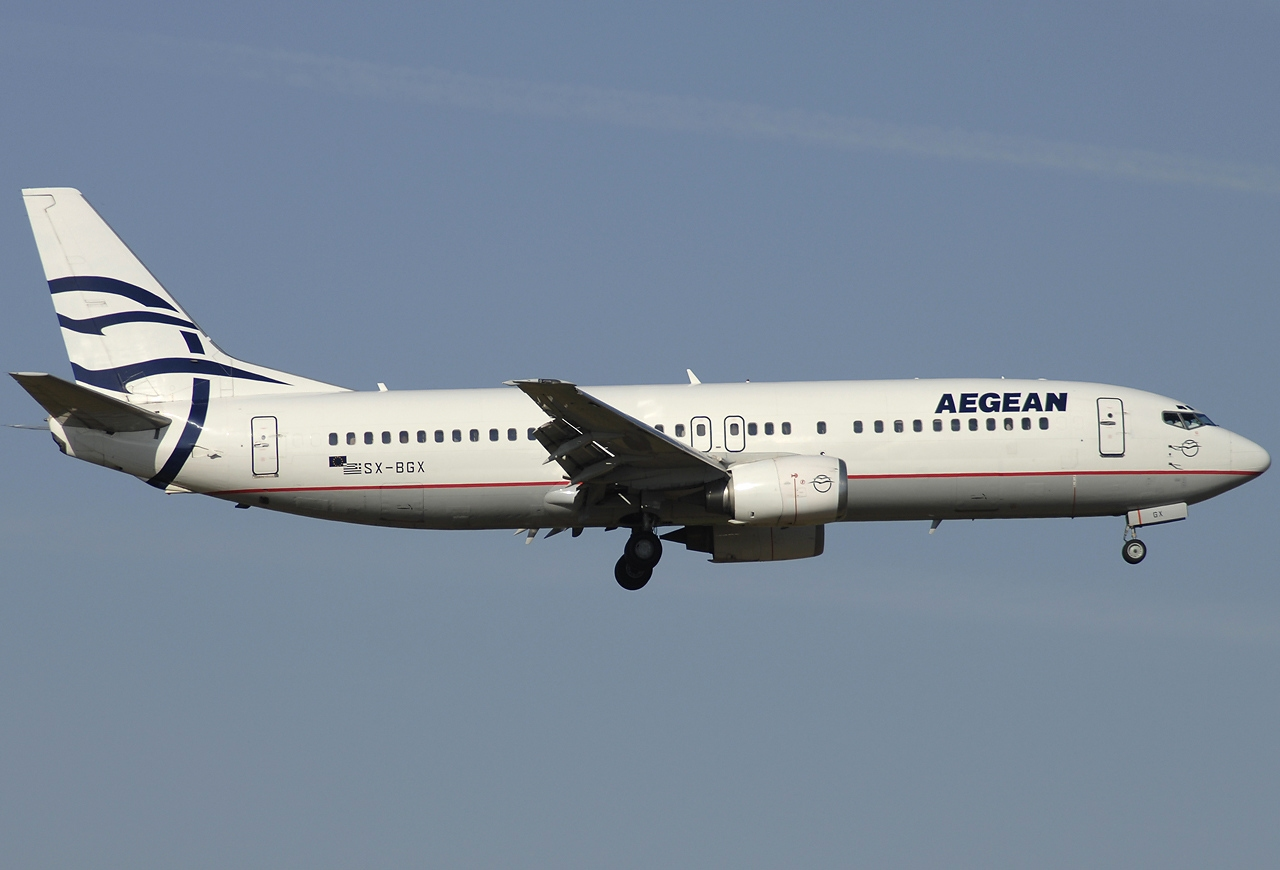
Aegean Airlines used Boeing 737-400s between 2001 and 2010

The former Aegean logo used until 2020

=== Beginnings ===
The company was founded in 1995, taking over activities from Aegean Aviation. It commenced VIP flights from Athens all over the world with wholly owned Learjet aircraft.

=== Commercial flights ===
Aegean's first commercial flights were in May 1999 from Athens to Heraklion, Crete and Thessaloniki with two new wholly owned British Aerospace Avro RJ100. In December 1999, Aegean acquired Air Greece. Since 2005, the airline has been in partnership with Lufthansa. In March 2006, Aegean Airlines also entered into a co-operation agreement with TAP Air Portugal. In December 2008, Aegean Airlines announced its co-operation with Brussels Airlines. In 2009, Aegean Airlines started codeshare agreements with BMI, Brussels Airlines, Lufthansa and TAP Air Portugal. On 26 May 2009, the Aegean Airlines' membership application was approved by the Chief Executive Board of Star Alliance. Aegean joined the alliance on 30 June 2010.

=== Olympic Air acquisition ===
In February 2010, initial shareholder discussions took place to consider co-operation between Aegean Airlines and Olympic Air fueling rumours of a possible merger. On 22 February 2010, Olympic Air and Aegean Airlines announced that they agreed to a merger. The newly merged airline was to carry the Olympic brand name and logo, after a transition period in which both airline brands would be used in parallel. The Aegean brand would cease to exist after the transition period. It was expected that the merger would be finalised and the combined airline would begin operation by October 2010.

Aegean joined Star Alliance at the end of June 2010. The intent was for the merged carrier to be a Star Alliance member, despite the fact that Olympic Air was forging ties with SkyTeam pre-merger. Star Alliance welcomed the proposed merger, releasing a statement stating "The integration teams from both sides will soon meet to assess the necessary steps, in order to guarantee a smooth transition of the merged Aegean Airlines and Olympic Air operations into the Star Alliance network".

On 26 January 2011, the European Commission blocked the merger between the two airlines, citing anti-competition concerns. The commission stated that the merger would have created a "quasi-monopoly" in Greece's air transport market, with the combined airline controlling more than 90% of the Greek domestic air transport market. The EC further stated its belief that the merger would lead to higher fares for four of the six million Greek and European passengers flying to and from Athens each year, with no realistic prospects that a new airline of sufficient size would enter the market to restrain the merged airline's pricing. Additionally, commissioner Joaquin Almunia stated that the merger would have led to higher prices and lower quality of service for Greeks and tourists traveling between Athens and the islands. Both carriers offered remedies in an attempt to ease concerns, though the EU believed that they would not be enough to protect travelers adequately and ease competition concerns. One of the remedies offered by the airlines included ceding takeoff and landing slots at Greek airports, though the commission noted that Greek airports do not suffer from the congestion observed at other European airports in previous airline mergers or alliances.

On 21 October 2012, Aegean Airlines announced that it had struck a deal to acquire Olympic Air, pending approval by the European Commission. On 23 April 2013, the European Commission issued a press release announcing it was starting an in-depth investigation into the proposed acquisition of Olympic Air by Aegean Airlines and announcing that the Commission will have decided by 3 September 2013. On 13 August 2013, it was published in the Greek media that the final decision had been delayed until 16 October 2013. The merger was approved by the European Commission on 9 October 2013, stating that "due to the on-going Greek crisis and given Olympic's own very difficult financial situation, Olympic would be forced to leave the market soon in any event".

On 1 February 2014, Aegean Airlines took over every non-Public Service Obligation route that was previously operated by Olympic Air.

=== Fleet renewal and COVID-19 pandemic ===
In June 2018, Aegean made an order of 30 aircraft from the Airbus A320neo family, and more specifically, 20 A320neo and 10 A321neo. These new aircraft would renew the company's fleet and gradually replace the older A320ceo family aircraft.

The first A320neo with Aegean's new livery and cabin was delivered in December 2019 and had its first commercial flight in February 2020. The first A321neo followed in September 2020.

In 2019, Aegean firstly expressed its interest to acquire Croatia Airlines, the Croatian flag carrier which it was planned to be privatized by the Croatian government. It was one of the two airlines that first expressed interest, together with Spanish regional airline Air Nostrum. However, due to the COVID-19 pandemic, the Croatian government decided to not go forward with the sale.

At the end of December 2020, the European Commission approved a €120 million state aid, to compensate for the financial losses due to the COVID-19 pandemic. The aid which was given in the form of a loan, was repaid in full by March 2023.

In February 2022, Aegean announced the installation of Wi-Fi equipment to the entire A320neo family fleet as well as select older A320ceo aircraft. The service offers three packages: Free 10', Text and Surf, and Stream, available for purchase.

By April 2024, the original A320neo family order was extended from 30 to 50 aircraft, four of which will be A321LR models in with a dedicated long-haul cabin with "lie-flat" business class seats. These planes will be used to serve existing destinations in the Gulf states, as well as potential new destinations in Central Africa and Asia. In 2025, the airline ordered two A321XLR aircraft, with intention to commence flights to India in March 2026. However, this order was cancelled in 2026 and replaced with two additional A321LR models, bringing orders for the type up to six.

== Corporate affairs ==
Its headquarters is building 57 at Athens International Airport.

=== Ownership ===
As of 3 July 2014, the airline is owned by Theodoros Vassilakis (34.17% - 23.6% via Evertrans S.A. and 9.46% via Autοhellas S.A.), Alnesco Enterprises Company Limited (9.48%), Siana Enterprises Company Limited (9.48%), and Konstantakopoulos Achilleas (6.39%).

=== Business trends ===
In 2009, Aegean Airlines carried 6.6 million passengers surpassing its then-rival Olympic Airlines (5.2 million passengers) for the first time. Losses were incurred 2010–2012, amidst the economic crisis for Greek tourism and the economy in general; passengers carried fell to 6.1 million, although the load factor increased to 74.3%. The group returned to profit in 2013, with further growth from 2014 with the takeover of Olympic Air operations.

Recent business trends for the group are shown below (for year ending 31 December; figures from 2014 onward include Olympic Air):

Year	Turnover (€ M)	Net profit (€ M)	Employees	Passengers (M)	Passenger load factor (%)	Aircraft (Note: at year end)	Notes/ references
2007	482	35.8	1,923	5.2	70.0	23	
2008	611	29.5	2,142	6.0	70.0	29	
2009	622	23.0	2,463	6.6	65.8	33	
2010	591	−23.3	1,949	6.2	68.1	26	
2011	668	−27.2	1,615	6.5	68.9	29	
2012	653	−10.5	1,347	6.1	74.3	28	
2013	682	66.3	1,459	6.9	79.0	30	Excl. OA
2014	911	80.4	1,678	10.1	78.3	50	Incl. OA
2015	983	68.4	2,344	11.6	76.9	58	
2016	1,020	32.2	2,334	12.5	77.4	62	
2017	1,127	60.4	2,493	13.2	83.2	58	
2018	1,187	67.9	2,703	13.9	83.9	61	
2019	1,308	78.5	2,924	15.0	84.8	62	
2020	415	−227	2,699	5.2	67.4	67	
2021	675	5.1	2,445	7.2	65.5	63	
2022	1,336	106	2,684	12.5	79.8	69	
2023	1,693	168	3,131	15.7	83.4	77	
2024	1,777	132	N/A	16.3	82.4	82	
2025	1,860	148	N/A	17.3	82.3	85	

== Destinations ==
Greece Destinations

=== Codeshare agreements ===
Aegean Airlines codeshares with the following airlines:

- Air Canada
- Air China
- Air Serbia
- airBaltic
- Animawings
- Austrian Airlines
- Brussels Airlines
- Bulgaria Air
- Cyprus Airways
- Discover Airlines
- Egyptair
- Emirates
- Ethiopian Airlines
- Eurowings
- Gulf Air
- Icelandair
- IndiGo
- ITA Airways
- Juneyao Air
- Kuwait Airways
- LOT Polish Airlines
- Lufthansa
- Saudia
- Singapore Airlines
- Swiss International Air Lines
- TAP Air Portugal
- Turkish Airlines
- Volotea

=== Interline agreements ===
Aegean Airlines has interline partnerships with the following airlines:

- Air Transat
- flydubai
- easyJet
- Norse Atlantic Airways
- Vueling

Additionally, Aegean Airlines has a commercial agreement with Trenitalia.

=== Charter flights ===
During the summer season, Aegean Airlines operates several A320s performing charter services in association with major tour operators. The charter flights connect popular holiday destinations in Greece to Italy, France, United Kingdom, Poland, Israel, Romania, Sweden, Denmark, Estonia, Finland, Norway, Slovenia, Austria, Germany, Hungary, Ukraine and other countries. In recent years, they have also operated charter flights for sport teams, for example, when the Greece national basketball team is playing abroad.

Aegean Airlines also owned a 51% stake in Animawings, a Romanian charter airline, from 2021 to 2024.

== Fleet ==
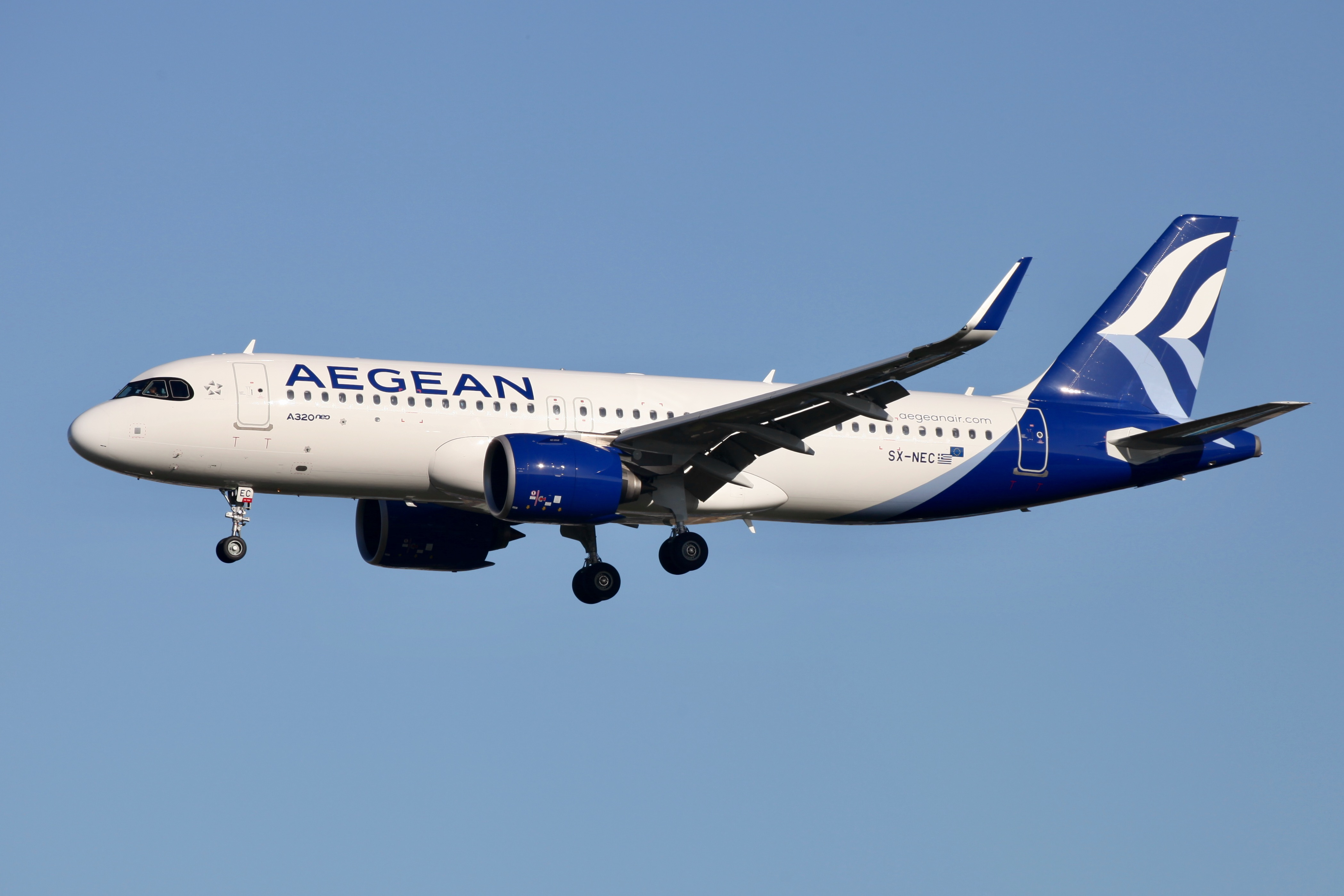
Aegean Airlines Airbus A320neo

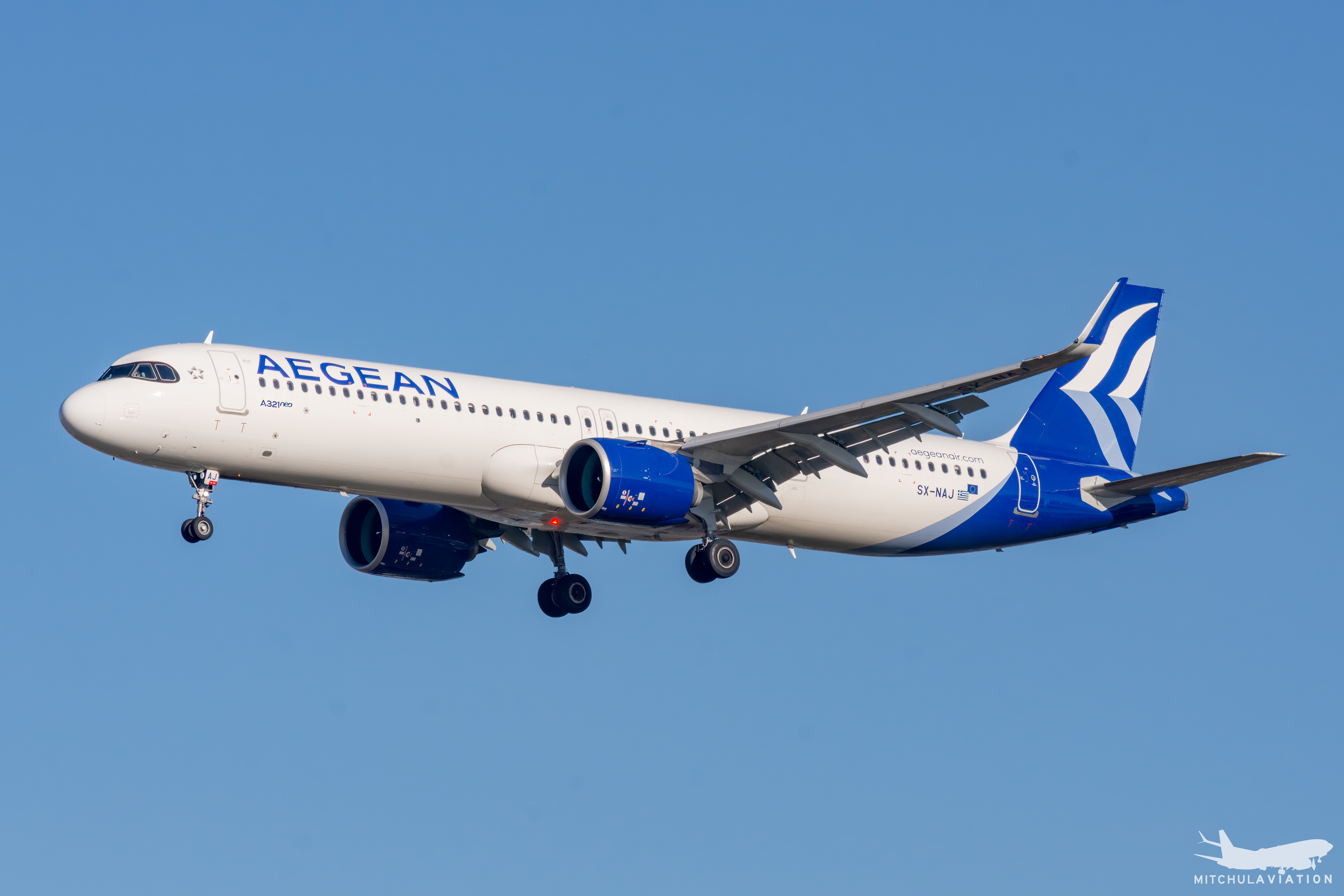
Aegean Airlines Airbus A321neo

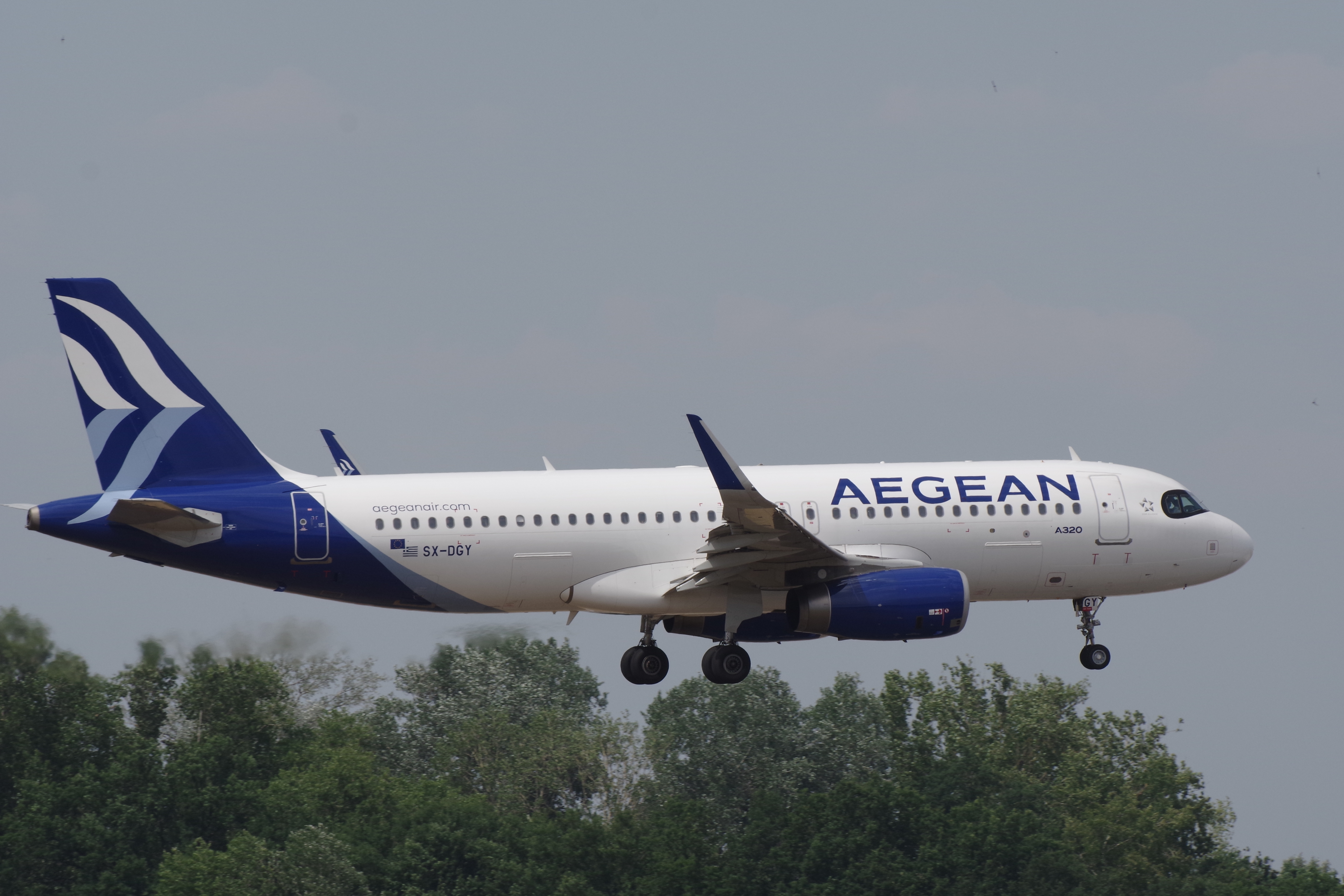
Aegean Airlines Airbus A320-200 in the new livery

=== Current fleet ===
As of November 2026, Aegean Airlines operates an all-Airbus fleet composed of the following aircraft:

Aegean Airlines fleet
Aircraft	In service	Orders	Passengers			Notes	Ref.
Aircraft	In service	Orders	C	Y	Total	Notes	Ref.
Airbus A320-200	24	—	—	174	174	To be retired and replaced by Airbus A321neo.	
Airbus A320neo	21	—	—	180	180		
Airbus A321-200	3	—	—	206	206	To be retired and replaced by Airbus A321neo.	
Airbus A321neo	24	9	—	220	220		
Airbus A321LR	—	6	16	162	178	Deliveries from 2027 to 2028.	
Total	72	15					

==== Aegean Executive ====
In addition to the aircraft above, this subsidiary of Aegean Airlines also operates a Learjet 60 and a Gulfstream G650 in plain colours without obvious logos. These aircraft are used for the provision of VIP services and executive travel, on a non-scheduled flight basis i.e. (air taxi).

=== Fleet development ===
In its history, the airline has so far made two strategic moves concerning its fleet. The first was meant to withdraw all turboprop planes from the fleet, which was accomplished in May 2004. In December 2005, the carrier placed an order for eight Airbus A320s.

In August 2010, Aegean Airlines became the first airline to commit to upgrading its Airbus A320 family fleet with the FANS-B+ datalink system offered by Airbus. By March 2014, passenger cabins across the entire fleet were retrofitted with brand-new reclining Aviointeriors Columbus Two seats, which are thinner and lighter, allowing the addition of an extra row. In 2014, Aegean Airlines also completed the purchase of seven brand-new Airbus A320ceo (current engine option) aircraft to add to its fleet; all deliveries were completed by early 2016.

In June 2018, Aegean firmed up a purchase agreement with Airbus for 10 A321neos and 20 A320neos, following a memorandum of understanding signed in March that year. The company also intended to lease up to 20 more Airbus aircraft. Before Aegean ultimately selected the Airbus A320neo family, it had also considered the Boeing 737 MAX family.

=== Historical fleet ===
In addition to its current aircraft, Aegean Airlines previously operated the following types:

- Airbus A319-100
- ATR 72-200
- ATR 72-500 (wet-leased from SwiftAir)
- Boeing 737-300
- Boeing 737-400
- British Aerospace Avro RJ100

=== Livery ===
The original Aegean Airlines livery is mostly "Eurowhite", featuring a thin red line towards the lower part of the fuselage. Above it, the fuselage is white and features the airline's name, written in dark blue using trademarked font series. Below the red line, the fuselage is painted grey. The Aegean Airlines logo featuring two seagulls flying in front of the sun, is featured on the tail of the aircraft.

During the A320neo delivery presentation, Aegean Airlines unveiled the new logo and livery inspired by Greek sky and seas, historical architecture and the country's design heritage. The new logo consisted of 2 seagulls in different sizes formed into a bigger seagull in the balanced and harmonical symmetry, representing the true spirit of Greece and the airline's values. The new livery follows the Greek identity, features a combination of the white and blue colors that representing traditional and modern Greek culture.

Aegean Airlines livery

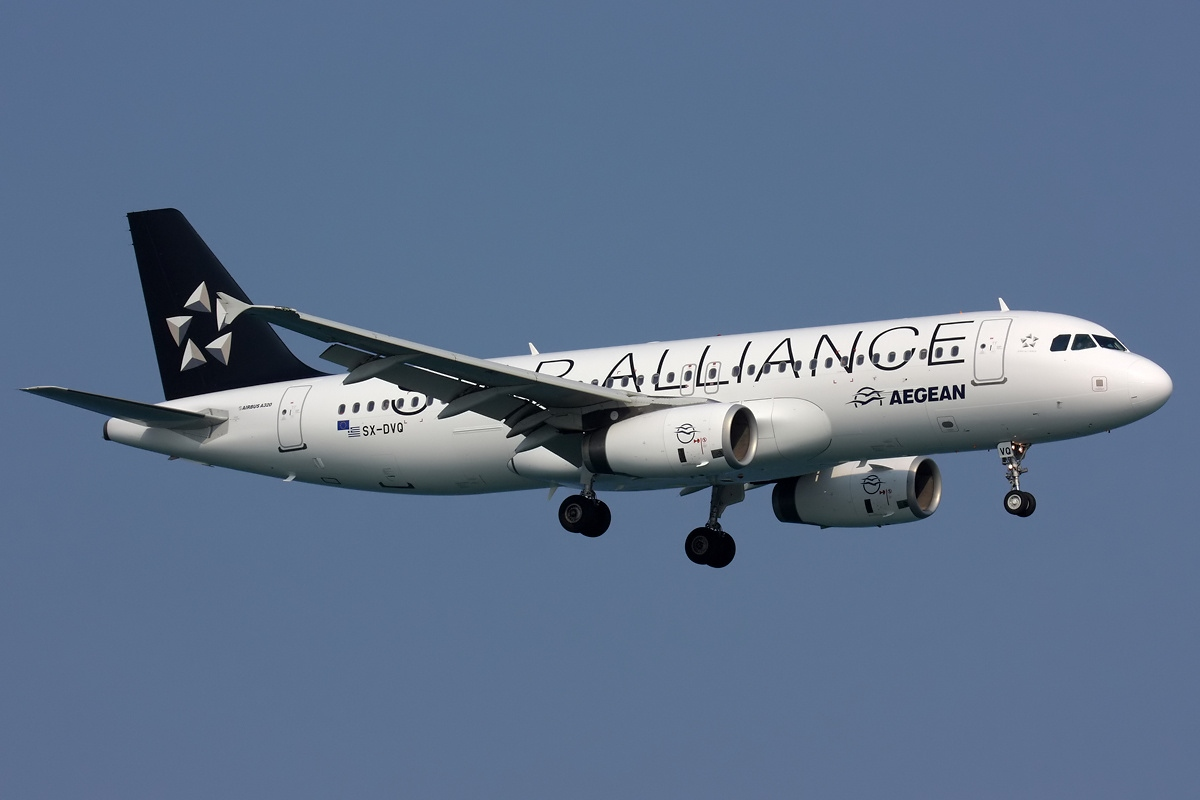
An Aegean Airlines A320-200 in Star Alliance livery

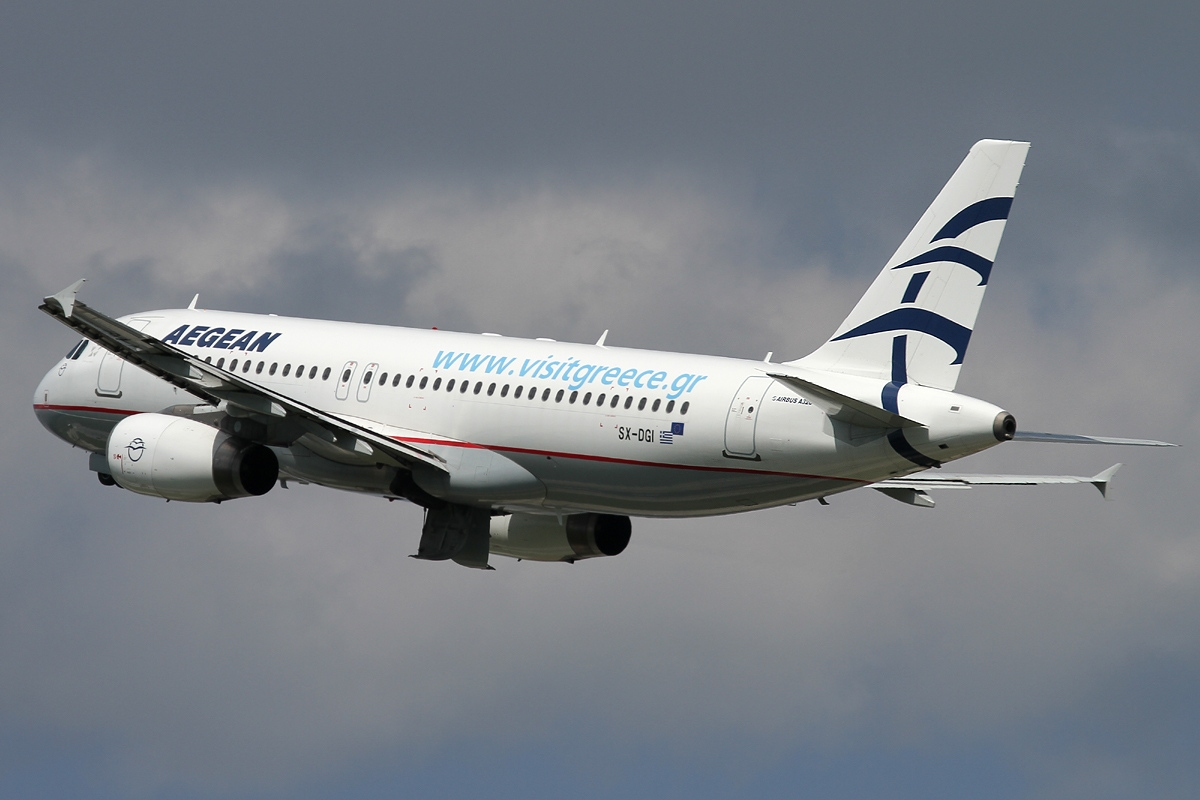
An Aegean A320-200 in the old livery with a Visit Greece sticker

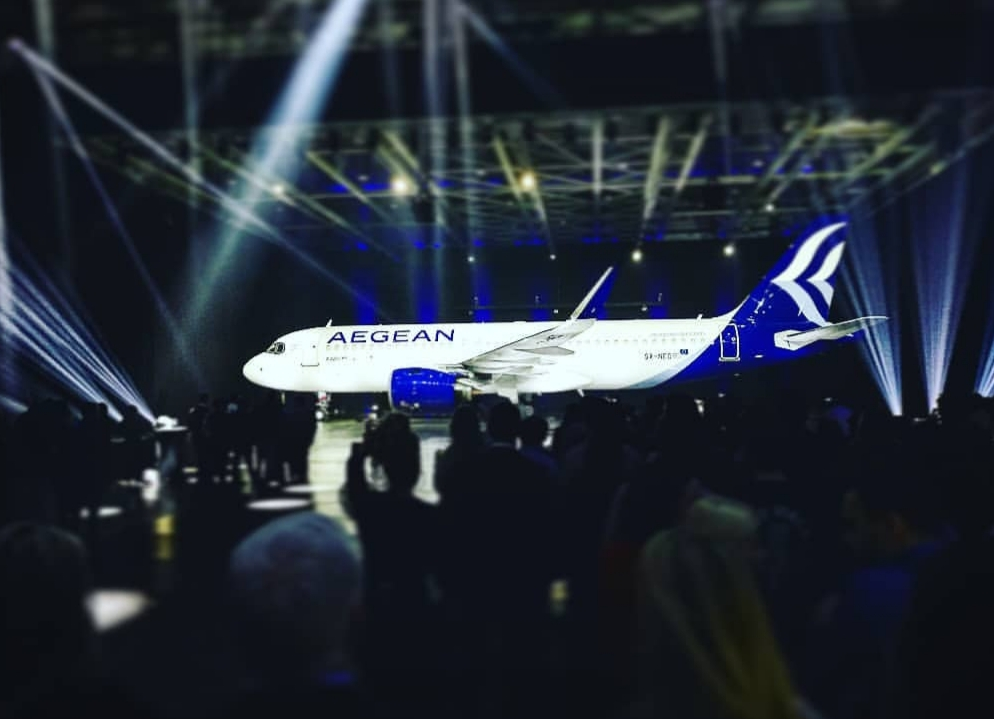
Aegean's new livery unveiling during the Airbus A320neo delivery presentation

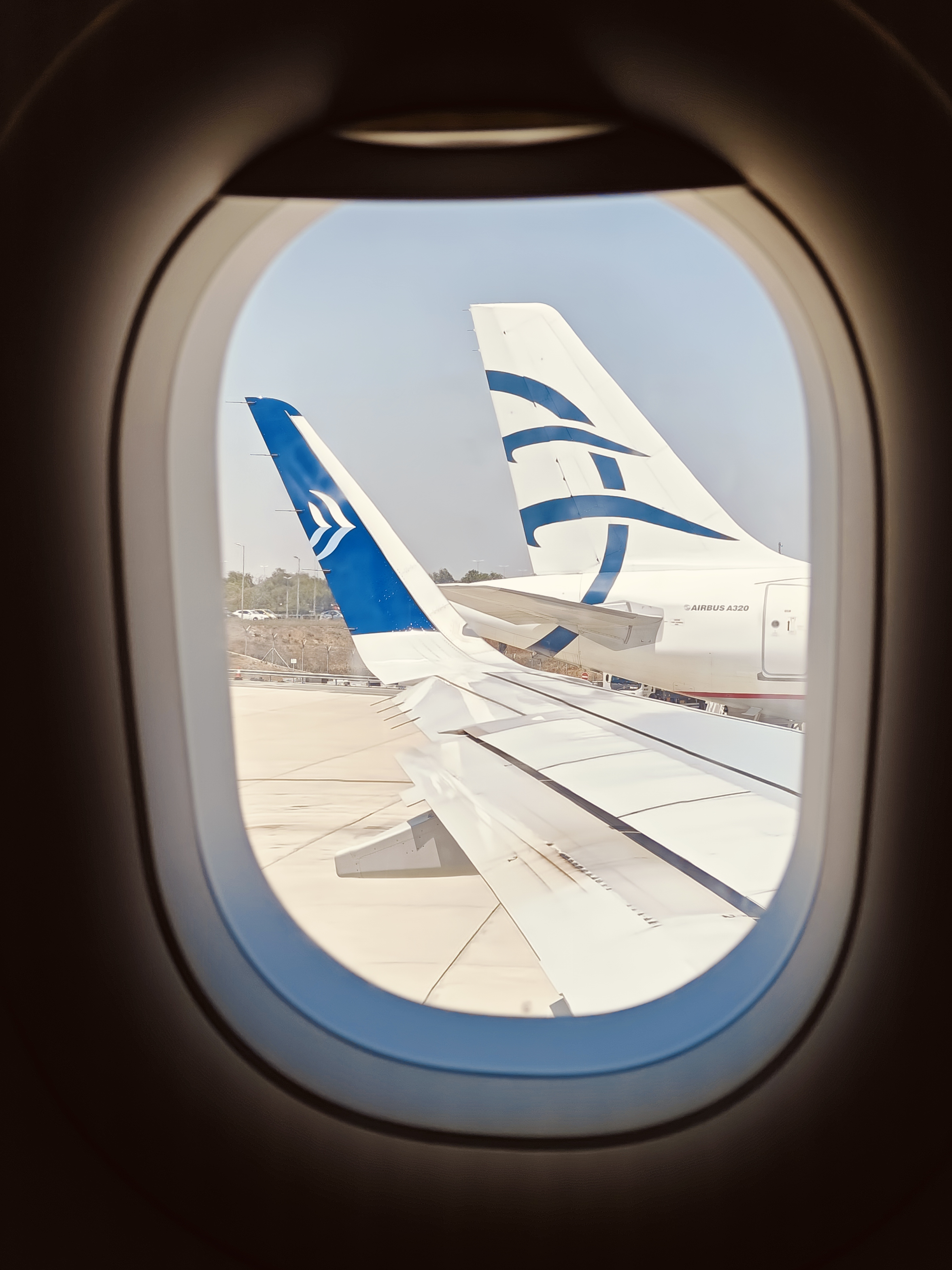
Aegean's new and old livery, on two side by side parked aircraft

== Services ==
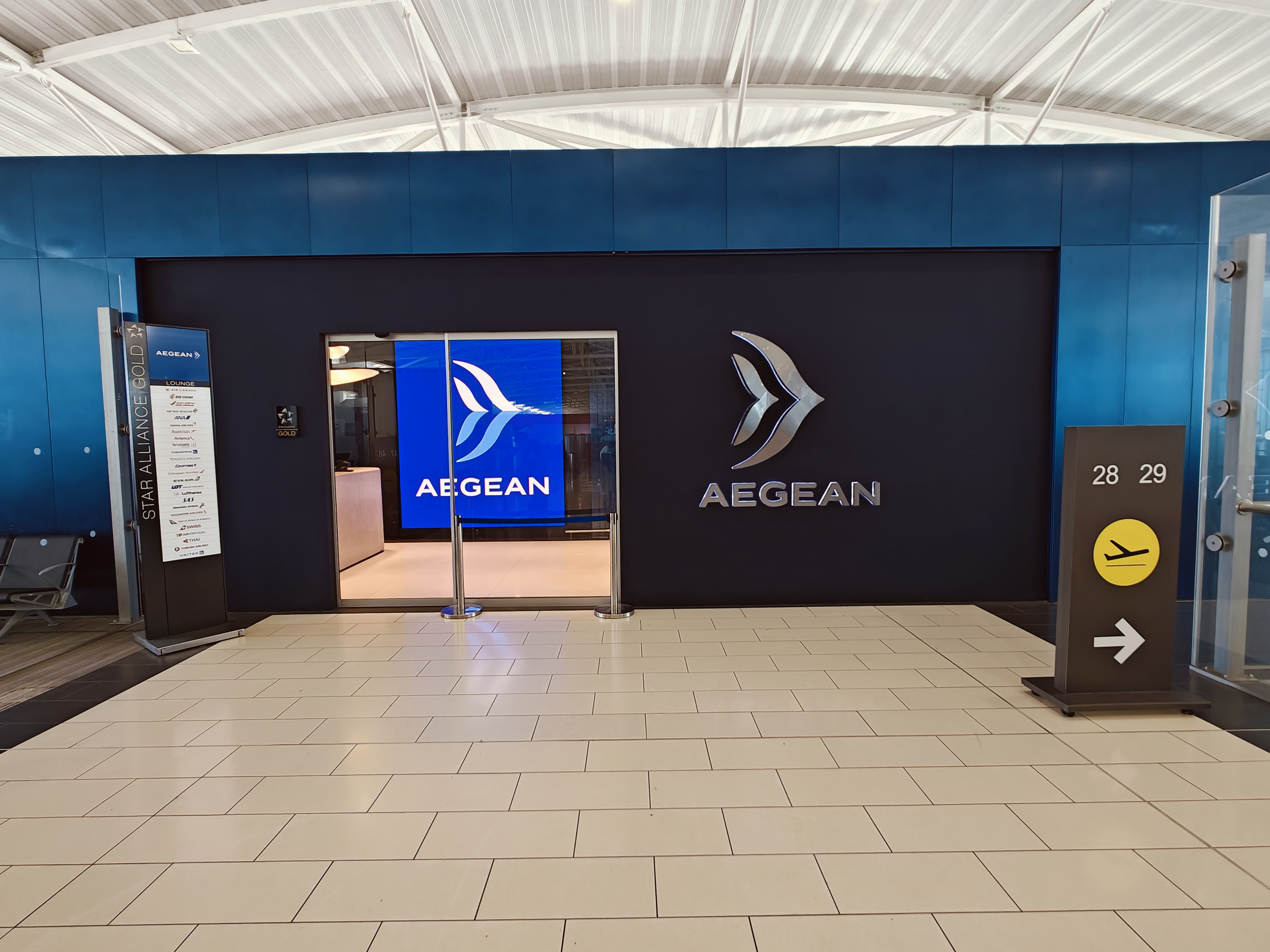
Aegean Business Lounge at Larnaca Airport, new location in 2024

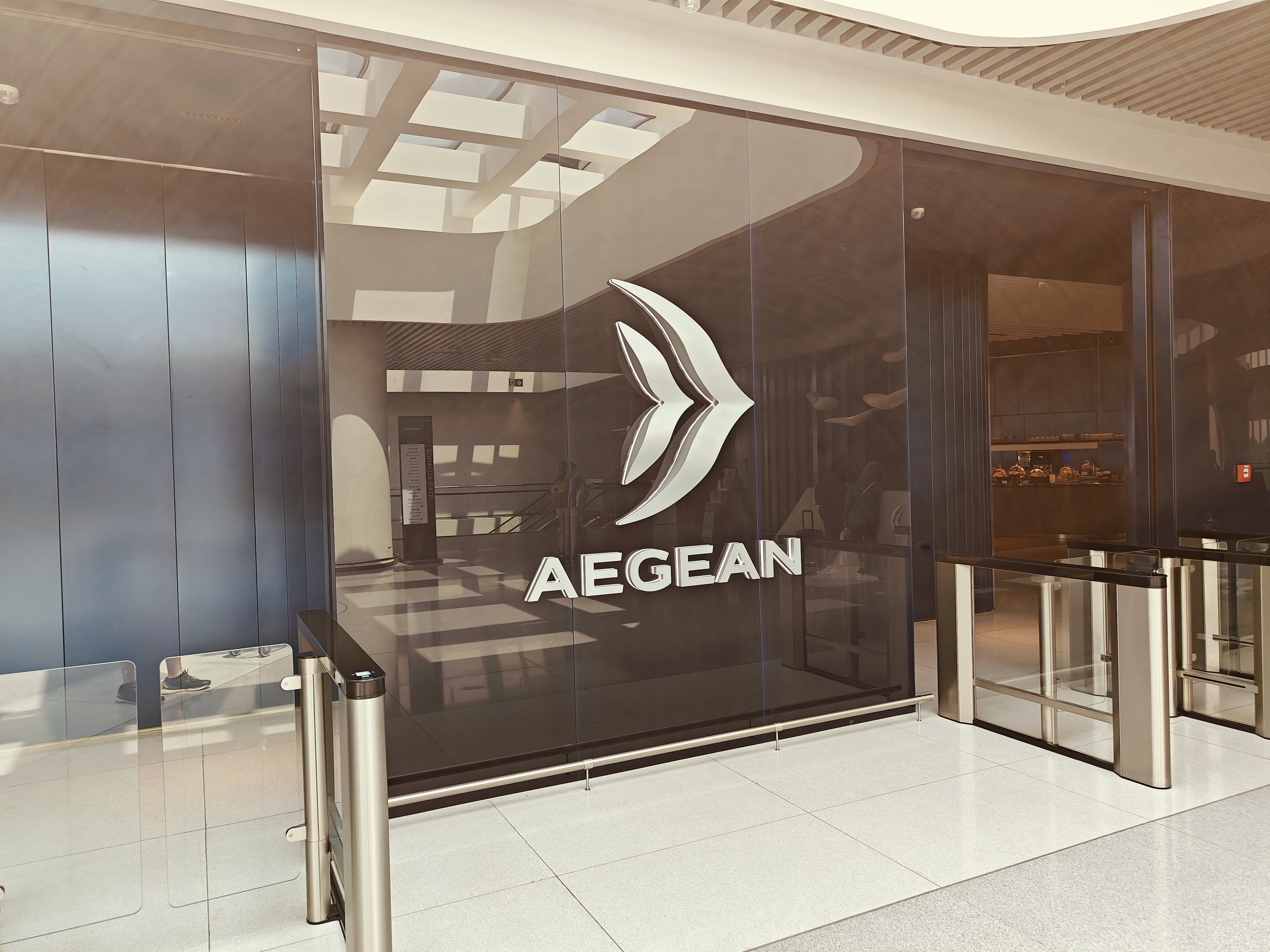
Entrance to the new extra-schengen aegean business lounge in Athens

=== Frequent-flyer program ===
Miles+Bonus is the frequent flyer program of Aegean Airlines and its Olympic Air subsidiary. It is a rebranding of Miles&Bonus, the former frequent flyer program of Aegean as well as a replacement for Olympic Air's Travelair Club. Miles+Bonus has three tiers: Blue, Silver and Gold.

=== Airport lounges ===
Gold members of Miles+Bonus, or those with Gold status in another Star Alliance airline, as well as passengers traveling on business class on an Aegean Airlines or other Star Alliance flight, all have access to the four Aegean Business Lounges in Athens, Thessaloniki and Larnaca.
