= Rood Ashton House =

House in West Ashton, Wiltshire, England

Coordinates: 51.303°N 2.165°W

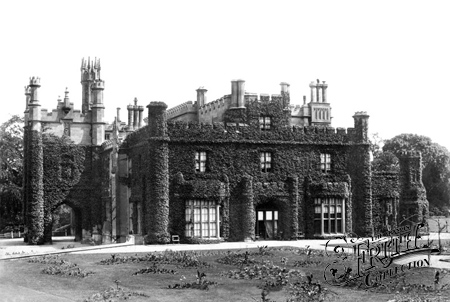
Rood Ashton House, Wiltshire

Rood Ashton House was a country house in Wiltshire, England, standing in parkland 0.5 miles (0.80 km) northeast of the village of West Ashton, near Trowbridge. Built in 1808 for Richard Godolphin Long, it was later the home of the 1st Viscount Long (1854–1924).

== History ==
Viscount Long's great grandfather Richard Godolphin Long commissioned architect Jeffry Wyattville to build the house in 1808, replacing an earlier mansion on the estate. It was redesigned and extended in 1836 by Thomas Hopper, who incorporated some panelling and other material brought from another Long family property, Whaddon House, which had been rescued from a fire there the previous year. Work was very slow, with an extension of the Billiard Room given as 1846 by the agent, H.E. Medlicott, and the re-building of the house not complete until the following year.

The designer of the park at Rood Ashton is problematic. H.E. Medlicott stated in 1916 that "The Drive to the Trowbridge Woods as far as the Trowbridge Lodge & the modern planting beyond the old wood was all laid out by Sir James Nassmyth a Scotch Landscape Gardner, friends of the Colquhouns, about 1845". This may be a mistake for Alexander Nasmyth (1758–1840), painter and garden designer, in which case the park must have been designed earlier, probably contemporaneously with Hopper's work on the house.

The estate was originally purchased by Edward Long of Monkton in 1597. In the 19th century a considerable amount of money was spent on improving its agriculture, but the Long family saw little return for their expenditure, and the changes in taxation on agricultural land brought about by the Lloyd George government made it financially unviable.

During the residence of Walter Long, 1st Viscount Long the house was visited by members of the British royal family, including the Prince of Wales, later Edward VIII. In 1914, during the First World War, Lord Long offered Rood Ashton and another of his properties, Culworth House in Northamptonshire, for use as convalescent homes for wounded soldiers and sailors.

== Auction ==
The house and the remaining 4,100 acres (17 km^{2}) were put to auction by Lord Long's executors in February 1930, six years after his death. The estate included 17 farms, 21 small holdings, 100 cottages, two public houses including The Long's Arms at Steeple Ashton, and a square mile of woodland. 2,500 acres (10 km^{2}) were purchased by a syndicate of his tenants, ending 333 years of continuous ownership by the Long family.

== Decline ==
The house was used as military accommodation and a hospital during World War II. In the 1950s it was advertised for sale again, and the agent's details listed eleven principal bed and dressing rooms, a further thirty five bedrooms, six bathrooms, two lodges, stabling, parkland, a lake and farm of 248 acres (1.00 km^{2}) with farmhouse and buildings, all for £35,000. The new owner stripped the house of all its assets: the lead roofing and all internal panelling, fireplaces etc., were put into containers and shipped to the United States, after which time the house, now a roofless shell, became derelict.

When Pevsner visited in the late 1950s or early 1960s he described the house as "now gutted and a ruin ... on a vast scale, and most impressive in its present state". In the 1970s the building was demolished except for the north wing, with eight bedrooms for servants, which has been restored with reclaimed timbers, and is now a private residence. Built in limestone ashlar, these remains have one and two storeys, and a square corner tower has three storeys and two octagonal corner pilasters, rising to turrets linked by a battlemented parapet. In 1975 the building was designated as Grade II listed. In March 2012 the property was on the market for an asking price of £2,650,000.

== Associated buildings ==
A short distance northeast of the house is a stable block with courtyard, carriage house and lodges. In stuccoed brick and matching the style of the house, the block was probably designed c.1830 by Hopper. According to the agent, H.E. Medlicott, these stables were largely added to and reconstructed after 1867. A servants' wing, beyond the back door of the main house, was added at the same time, under the supervision of a clerk of works called Roberts. The Lake and water supply reservoir were made between 1867 and 1876.

A former lodge, Castle Lodge, is half a mile northwest of the house, at an entrance (no longer in use) from what is now the A350. It is an imitation of a castle, with an arched carriage entrance, battlements and two three-storey towers, one square and one round. The revised Buildings of England, Wiltshire, calls it "very picturesque, even if silly". English Heritage thought it probably contemporary with the 1836 alterations to the house. This is confirmed by the reminiscences of the agent, H.E. Medlicott, in 1916, who gave the build date of Castle Lodge as 1838. It replaced an old lodge, midway between Castle and Trowbridge Lodges.

At the southwest entrance to the grounds is West Ashton Lodge, designed by T. H. Wyatt, and nearby is West Ashton's parish church, St John's (1846), which contains the Long family crypt.
