= Thomas Brudenell-Bruce, 1st Earl of Ailesbury =

British courtier

The Right Honourable The Earl of Ailesbury KT
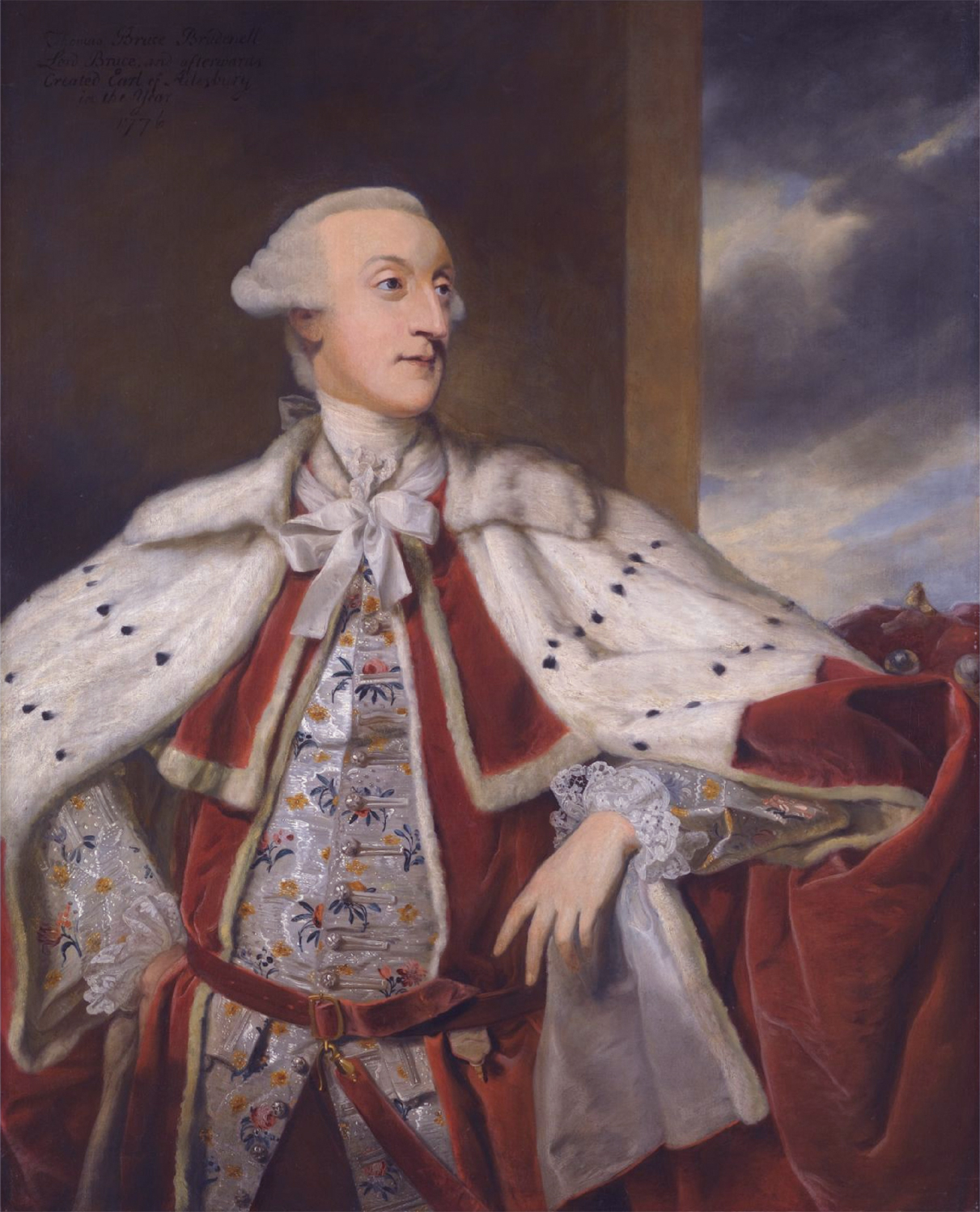
- The Earl of Ailesbury by Joshua Reynolds.

Lord-Lieutenant of Wiltshire
- In office 1780–1782
- Preceded by: The Earl of Pembroke
- Succeeded by: The Earl of Pembroke

Personal details
- Born: 30 April 1729
- Died: 19 April 1814 (aged 84) Seamore Place, Mayfair, London, England
- Spouses: Susanna Hoare (m. 1761; died 1783); Anne Elizabeth Rawdon (m. 1788; died 1813)
- Children: 5, including Charles Brudenell-Bruce, 1st Marquess of Ailesbury
- Parents: George Brudenell, 3rd Earl of Cardigan; Elizabeth Bruce

Thomas Brudenell-Bruce, 1st Earl of Ailesbury, KT (30 April 1729 – 19 April 1814), styled The Honourable Thomas Brudenell until 1747 and known as the Lord Bruce between 1747 and 1776, was a British courtier.

== Background and education ==
Born Thomas Brudenell, he was the youngest son of George Brudenell, 3rd Earl of Cardigan and Lady Elizabeth Bruce. He was the younger brother of George Montagu, 1st Duke of Montagu, James Brudenell, 5th Earl of Cardigan and the Honourable Robert Brudenell. He was educated at Winchester College. In February 1747, aged 17, he succeeded his uncle, the 4th Earl of Elgin and 3rd and last Earl of Ailesbury, as 2nd Baron Bruce of Tottenham according to a special remainder in the letters patent. In 1767 he assumed by Royal licence the additional surname of Bruce.

== Public life ==
Coats of Arms of Thomas Brudenell-Bruce

When the Wiltshire Militia was embodied on 8 November 1758 he was commissioned as its Colonel. He (and many of his officers) resigned in 1770 when the Lord Lieutenant of Wiltshire promoted a junior officer to the vacant position of Lieutenant-Colonel of the regiment.

Lord Bruce served as a Lord of the Bedchamber to King George III, and was briefly in May 1776 Governor to the Prince of Wales and Prince Frederick. In June 1776 he was created Earl of Ailesbury (later styled Aylesbury), in the County of Buckingham, a revival of the earldom which had become extinct on his uncle's death. He subsequently served as Lord Lieutenant of Wiltshire from 1780 to 1782, as Lord Chamberlain to Queen Charlotte from 1780 to 1792 and as Treasurer to Queen Charlotte from 1792 to 1814.

On 29 November 1786 he was made a Knight of the Order of the Thistle.

He hired Capability Brown to work on Tottenham House from 1764 to c 1770.

== Family ==
Lord Ailesbury married firstly, Susanna Hoare, daughter of the banker Henry Hoare and widow of Charles Boyle, Viscount Dungarvan, on 17 February 1761; her only child from her first marriage was Henrietta O'Neill, later a successful poet. They had five children:

- Lady Caroline Anne Brudenell-Bruce (d. 1824), died unmarried.
- George Brudenell-Bruce, Lord Bruce (1762–1783), died unmarried.
- Lady Frances Elizabeth Brudenell-Bruce (1765–1836), married Sir Henry Wright-Wilson, MP for St Albans.
- Hon. Charles Brudenell-Bruce (1767–1768), died in infancy.
- Charles Brudenell-Bruce, 1st Marquess of Ailesbury (1773–1856).

Susanna, Countess of Ailesbury, died on 4 February 1783. Lord Ailesbury married as his second wife Lady Anne Elizabeth Rawdon (1753-1813), eldest daughter of John Rawdon, 1st Earl of Moira, on 14 February 1788. There were no children from this marriage. She died on 8 January 1813. Lord Ailesbury died at Seamore Place, Mayfair, London, in April 1814, aged eighty-four. He was succeeded in the earldom by his third but only surviving son, Charles, who was created Marquess of Ailesbury in 1821.

== Gallery ==
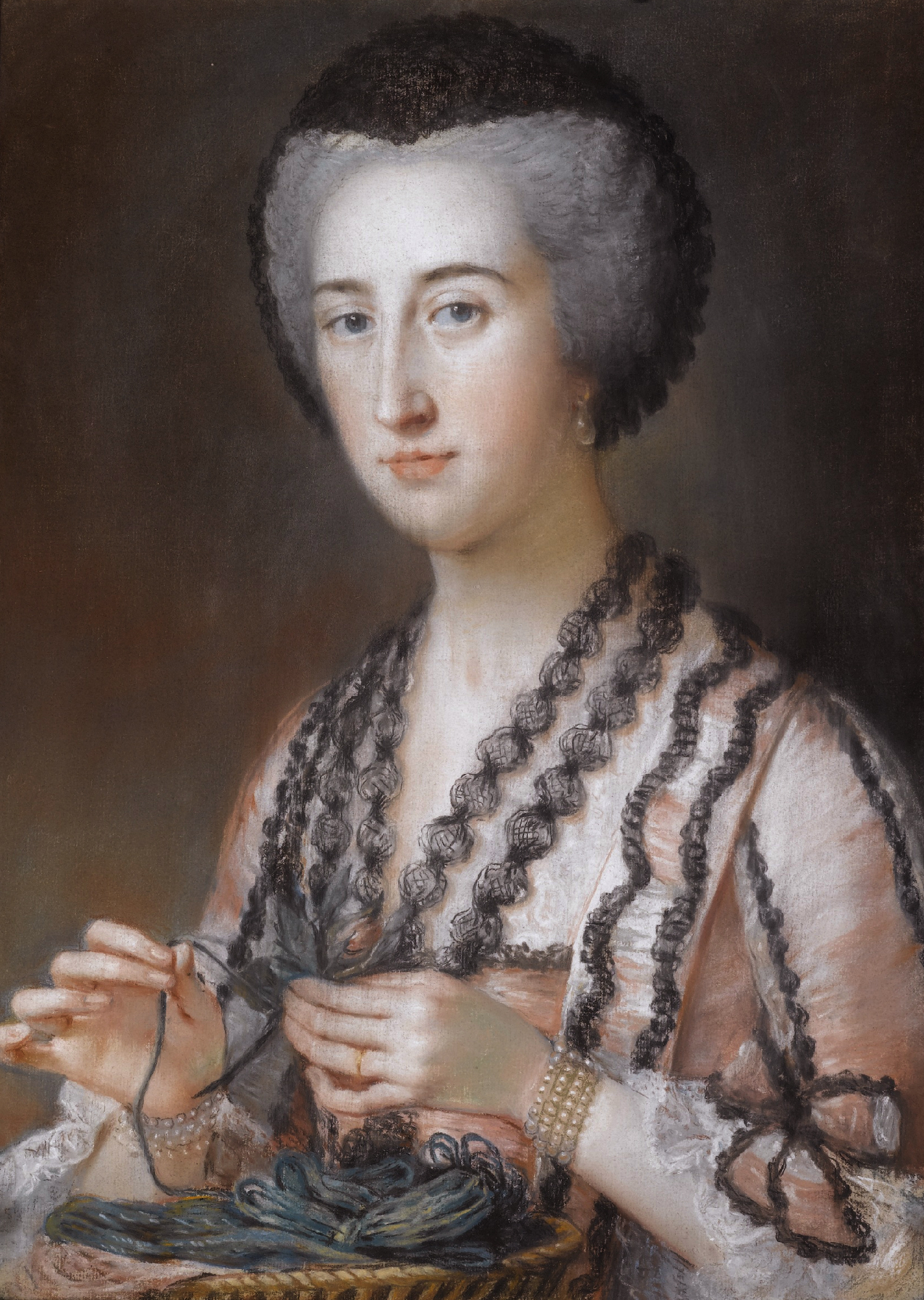
Lord Ailesbury's first wife, Susanna Hoare, was the widow of Charles Boyle, Viscount Dungarvan.

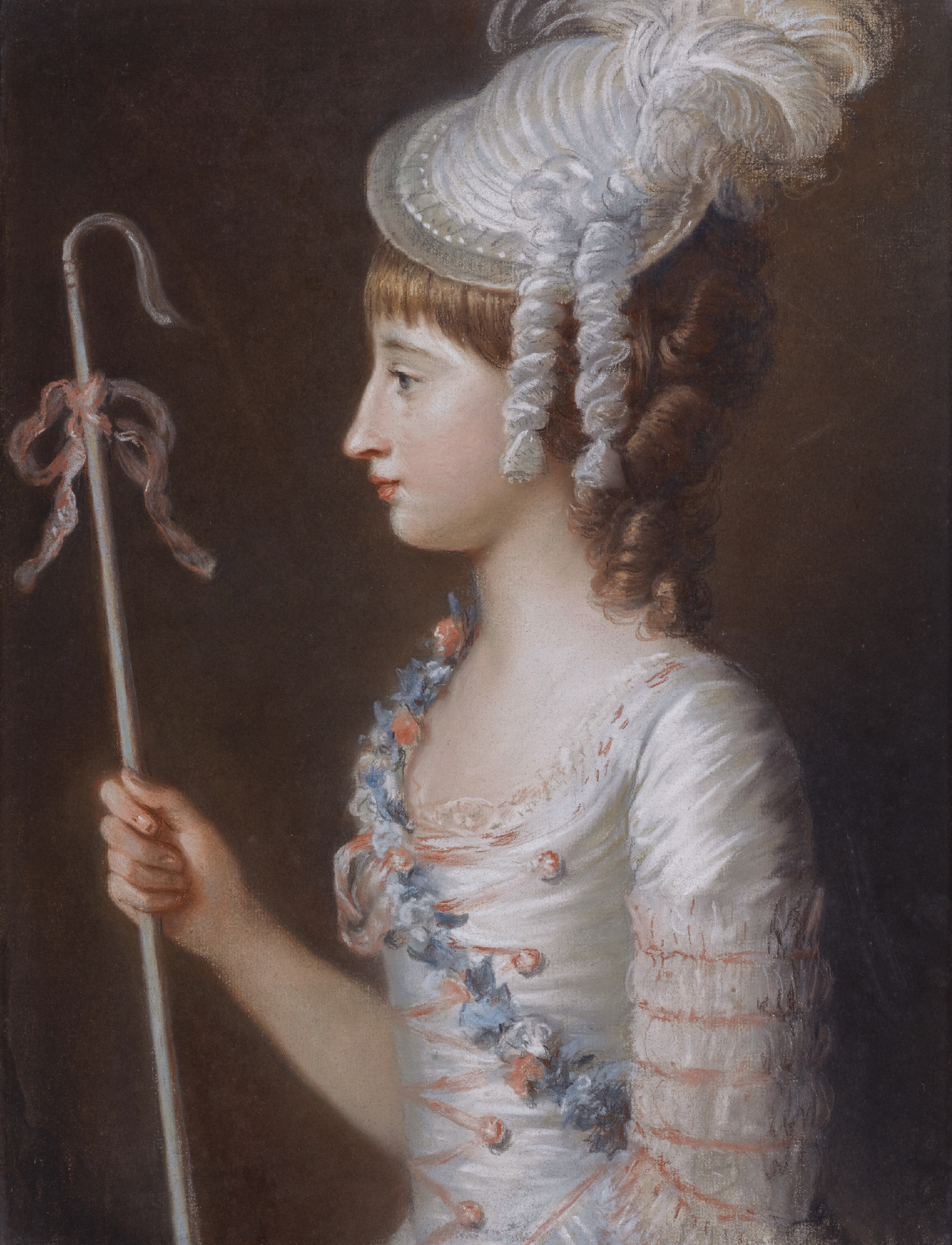
Lord Ailesbury's eldest daughter Lady Caroline Anne Brudenell-Bruce died unmarried in 1824.

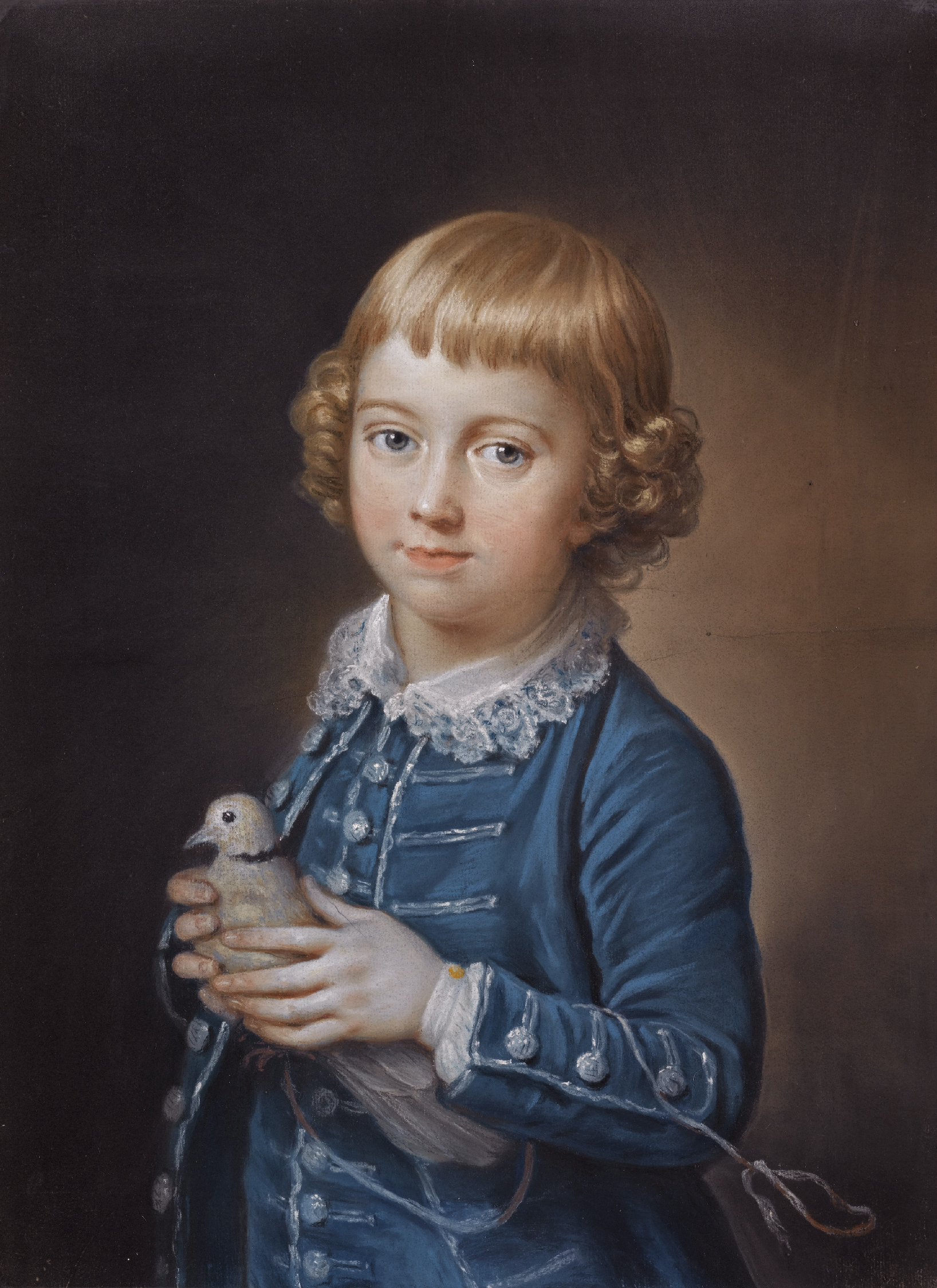
Lord Ailesbury's eldest son George, Lord Bruce, died at the age of 20 or 21.

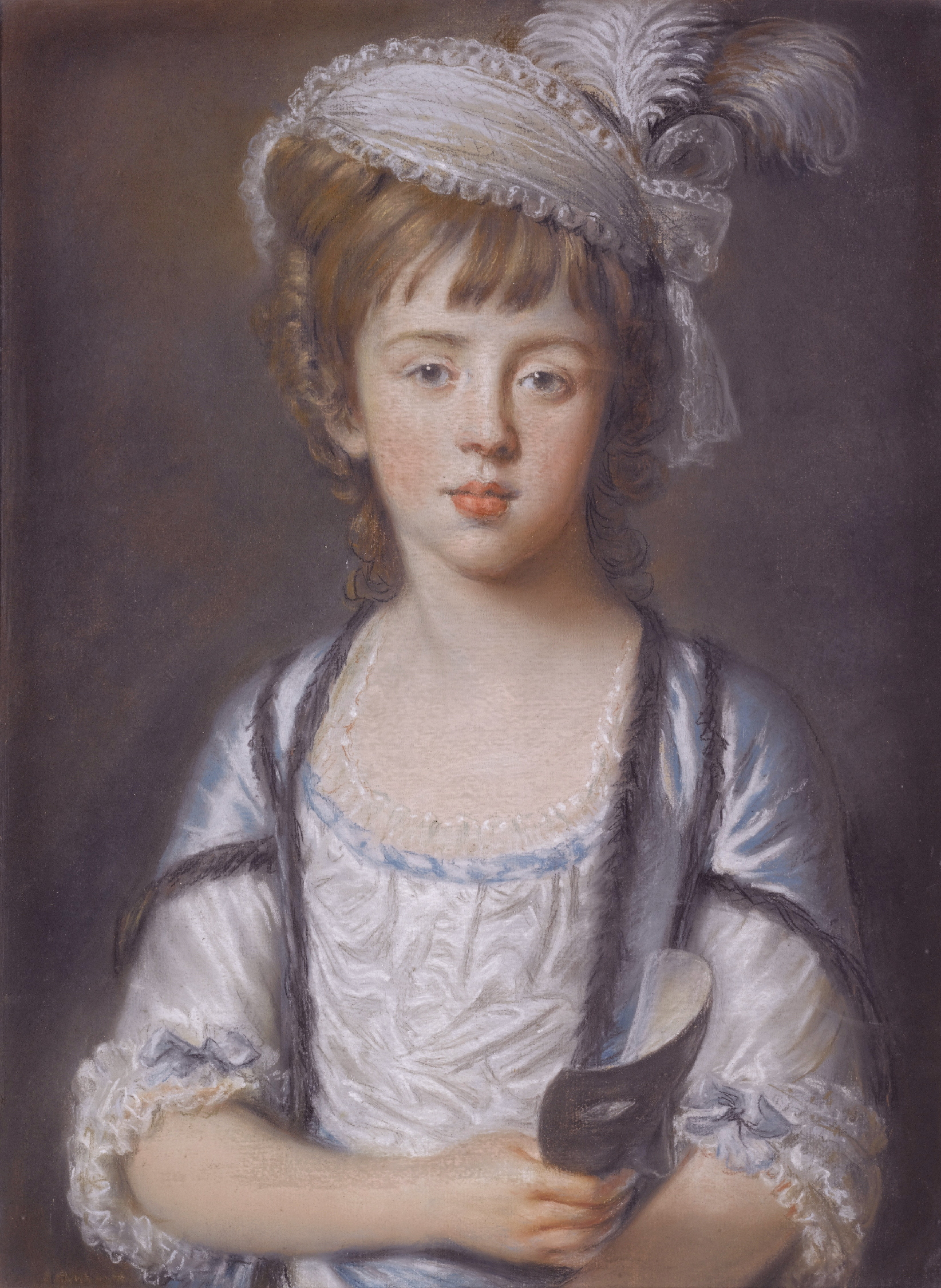
Lord Ailesbury's second daughter Lady Frances Elizabeth Brudenell-Bruce later married Sir Henry Wright-Wilson of Chelsea Park, Middlesex.

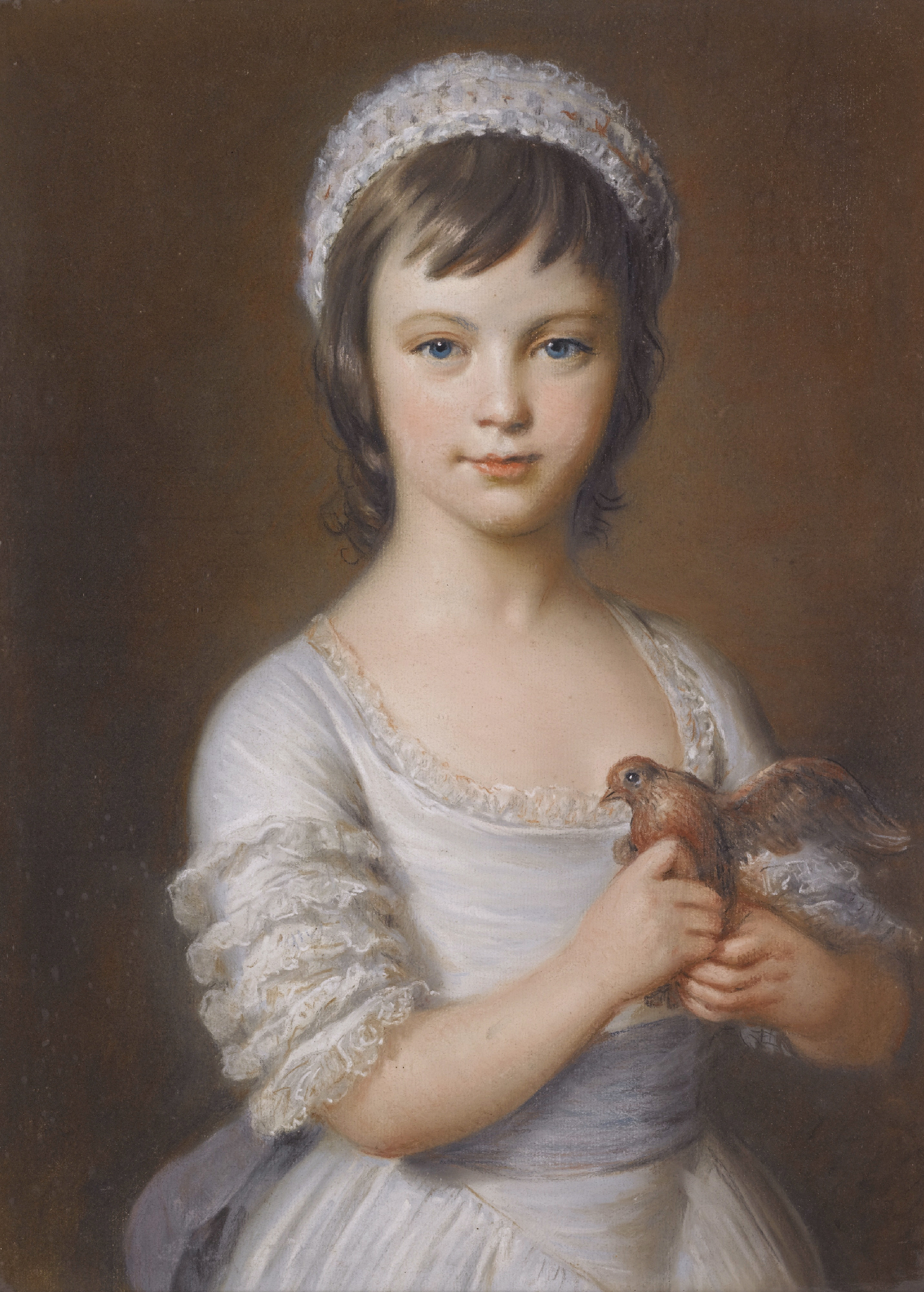
Lord Ailesbury's third and youngest son, Charles, later 1st Marquess of Ailesbury.

=== Bibliography ===
==== Manuscripts ====
- correspondence and papers
- papers
- miscellaneous correspondence 1753-1809
- 1796-1807 correspondence with Duke of Buccleuch
- 196-1807 Letters to Sir R J Buxton
- correspondence with Lord Elgin
- 1766-68 - ten letters to Lord Rockingham.

==== Sources ====
- Debrett, John (2002). Peerage of Great Britain and Ireland. Vol. 1/2. Adamant Media Corp.
- Ailesbury, Marquess of (1962). The History of Savernake Forest (first ed.).
- Henning, duke (1986). Thorne (ed.). History of Parliament: the House of Commons 1790-1820. Boydell & Brewer.
- Col N.C.E. Kenrick, The Story of the Wiltshire Regiment (Duke of Edinburgh's): The 62nd and 99th Foot (1756–1959), the Militia and the Territorials, the Service Battalions and all those others who have served or been affiliated with the Moonrakers, Aldershot: Gale & Polden, 1963.

Court offices
Preceded by Marquess of Carmarthen	Lord Chamberlain to Queen Charlotte; 1780–1792	Succeeded by The Earl of Morton
Vacant Title last held by The Earl of Guilford	Treasurer to Queen Charlotte; 1792–1814	Succeeded by The Earl of Effingham
Honorary titles
Preceded by The Earl of Pembroke	Lord-Lieutenant of Wiltshire; 1780–1782	Succeeded by The Earl of Pembroke
Peerage of Great Britain
New creation	Earl of Ailesbury; 1776–1814	Succeeded by Charles Brudenell-Bruce
Preceded by Charles Bruce	Baron Bruce; 1747–1814	Succeeded by Charles Brudenell-Bruce
