= Henrietta O'Neill =

Irish poet

Henrietta O'Neill (1758 – September 1793) was an Irish poet.

The only daughter of Charles Boyle, Viscount Dungarvan, and his wife, the former Susannah Hoare, she was born Henrietta Boyle. Her father died in 1759 and her mother later married Thomas Brudenell-Bruce; her younger half-siblings included Charles Brudenell-Bruce, 1st Marquess of Ailesbury. She married John O'Neill in 1777, when he was an Irish MP.

Henrietta O'Neill was a friend of the English novelist and poet Charlotte Smith. She was also an amateur actor and painter. Her best known poems are "Ode to the Poppy" and "Written on Seeing her Two Sons at Play".

Her two children were:

- Charles O'Neill, 1st Earl O'Neill (1779–1841)
- John O'Neill, 3rd Viscount O'Neill (1780–1855)

O'Neill died in Portugal in 1793, while still in her thirties. Her husband outlived her, becoming a baron in 1793 and a viscount in 1795, but was killed during the Irish Rebellion of 1798 at the age of 58.
