= Susanna Brudenell-Bruce, Countess of Ailesbury =

English countess and textile artist (1732–1783)

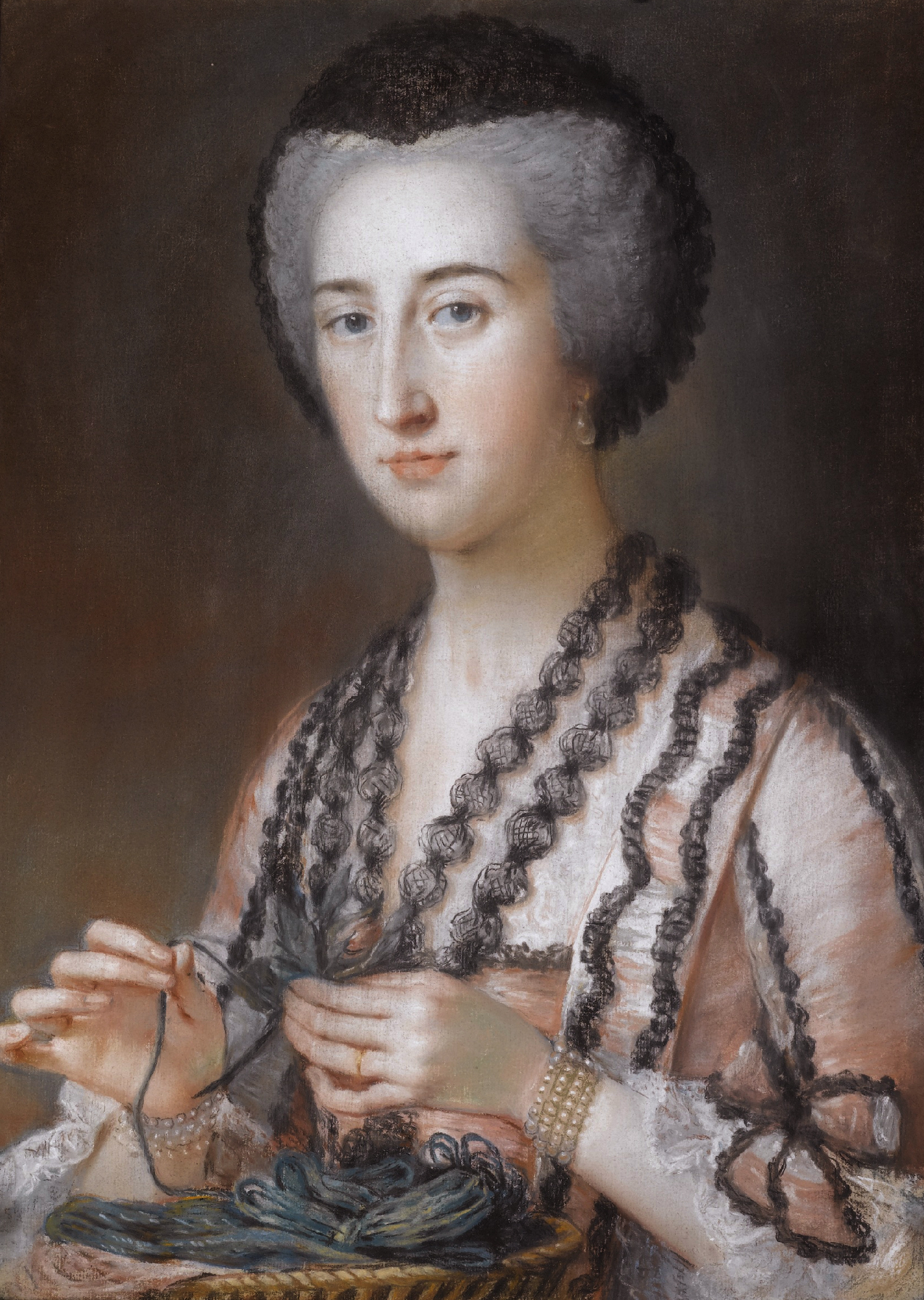
Susanna, Countess of Ailesbury, by William Hoare

Susanna Brudenell-Bruce, Countess of Ailesbury (15 April 1732 – 4 February 1783), formerly Susanna(h) Hoare, was the first wife of Thomas Brudenell-Bruce, 1st Earl of Ailesbury, and the mother of the 1st Marquess.

She was born at Stourhead, Wiltshire, the daughter of wealthy banker Henry Hoare and his second wife Sarah, formerly Sarah Colt. Her elder sister, Anne, married Sir Richard Hoare, 1st Bt., and died in 1759.

Her first husband was Charles Boyle, Viscount Dungarvan, whom she married in 1753; the marriage was rumoured to be unhappy. They had one child, Henrietta Boyle (c.1756–1793), who married John O'Neill, 1st Viscount O'Neill, and had children. Henrietta became widely known in literary circles.

Viscount Dungarvan died in 1759. The widowed Lady Dungarvan married Brudenell-Bruce on 17 February 1761 at Tottenham Park, Wiltshire. Their children were:

- Lady Caroline Anne Brudenell-Bruce (d. 1824), who died unmarried
- George Brudenell-Bruce, Lord Bruce (1762–1783), who as a child was painted by William Hoare, died unmarried
- Lady Frances Elizabeth Brudenell-Bruce (1765–1836), who as a child was painted by William Hoare, married Sir Henry Wilson; the couple later took the surname Wright to secure an inheritance
- Hon. Charles Bruce (1767–1768)
- Charles Brudenell-Bruce, 1st Marquess of Ailesbury (1773–1856), who married twice, first to Henrietta Maria Hill and second to Maria Elizabeth Tollemache, and had children by both marriages

The countess died in 1783, aged 50. She was an artist in needlework whose “piece of flowers in needle-work” was considered sufficiently of interest to be exhibited publicly in 1768 by the Free Society of Artists, as was subsequently catalogued by the publisher and art historian Algernon Graves. The portrait of her by William Hoare shows her holding yarn and she appears to be engaged in lace tatting. Her dress carries prominent black lace tatting decorations.

Five years after his first wife's death, the earl married Lady Anne Elizabeth Rawdon (1753–1813); they had no children. The earl himself died in 1814.

A portrait of the countess, dated 1757, by Arthur Pond, is held by the National Trust at Stourhead. Another portrait, by William Hoare of Bath, is held at the Victoria Art Gallery in Bath.
