= Ernest Brudenell-Bruce, 3rd Marquess of Ailesbury =

British politician

The Most Honourable The Marquess of Ailesbury PC
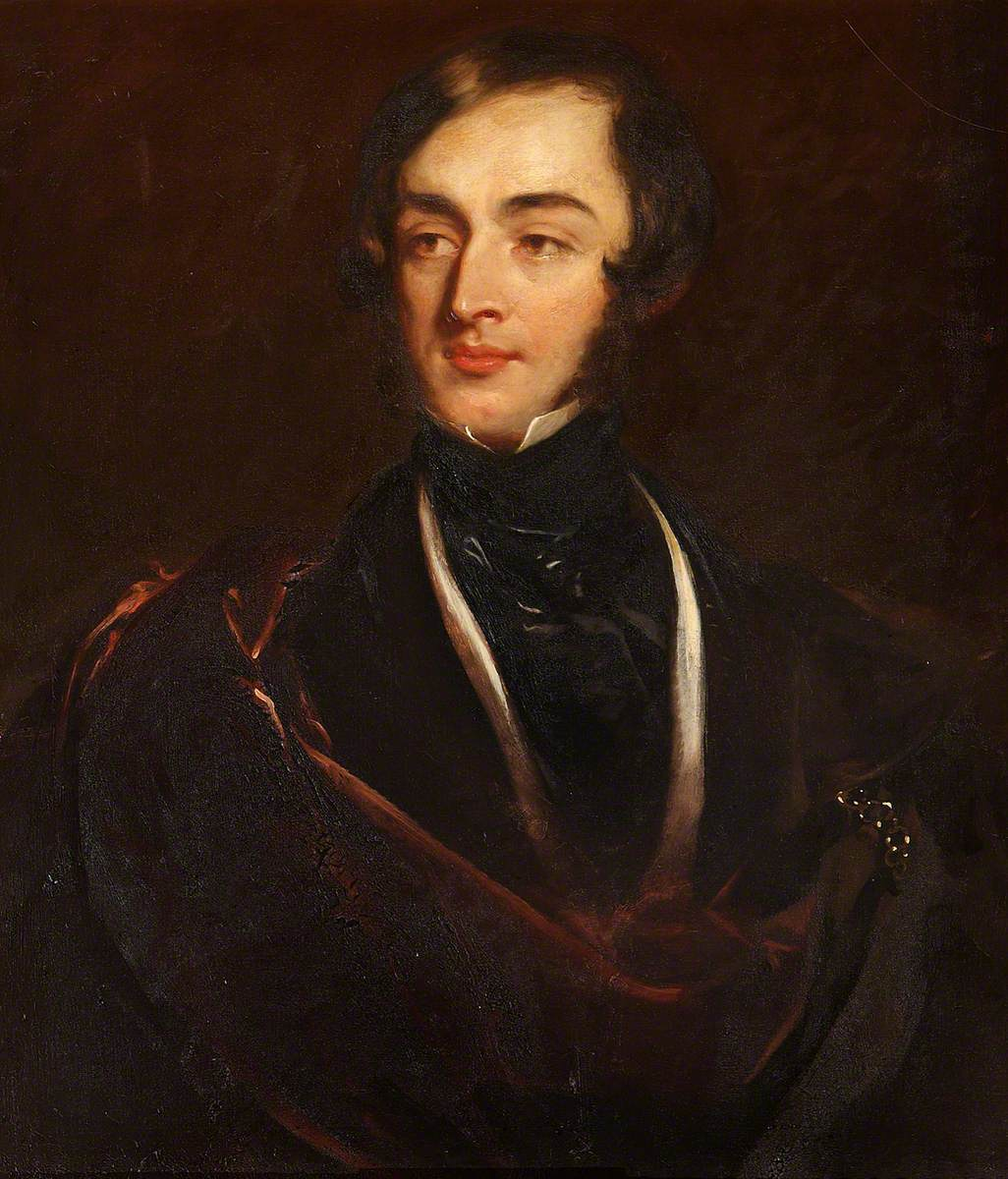

Vice-Chamberlain of the Household
- In office 7 September 1841 – 29 June 1846
- Monarch: Victoria
- Prime Minister: Sir Robert Peel, Bt
- Preceded by: Earl of Belfast
- Succeeded by: Lord Edward Howard
- In office 30 December 1852 – 21 February 1858
- Monarch: Victoria
- Prime Minister: The Earl of Aberdeen; The Viscount Palmerston
- Preceded by: Viscount Newport
- Succeeded by: Viscount Newport

Personal details
- Born: 8 January 1811 St James's Square, London, England
- Died: 18 October 1886 (aged 75) Savernake, Wiltshire, England
- Spouse: Hon. Louisa Horsley-Beresford (m. 1834)
- Children: 7
- Parent(s): Charles Brudenell-Bruce, 1st Marquess of Ailesbury; Hon. Henrietta Maria Hill
- Education: Trinity College, Cambridge

Ernest Augustus Charles Brudenell-Bruce, 3rd Marquess of Ailesbury, PC (8 January 1811 – 18 October 1886), styled Lord Ernest Brudenell-Bruce from 1821 until 1878, was a British courtier and politician. He served for many years as Vice-Chamberlain of the Household.

== Background and education ==
Brudenell-Bruce was born at Warren's Hotel, St James's Square, London, the second son of Charles Brudenell-Bruce, 1st Marquess of Ailesbury, by his wife Hon. Henrietta Maria Hill, daughter of Noel Hill, 1st Baron Berwick. George Brudenell-Bruce, 2nd Marquess of Ailesbury was his elder brother and Lord Charles Bruce his younger half-brother. He was educated at Eton College and Trinity College, Cambridge.

He owned 55,000 acres in Wiltshire, Yorkshire and Berkshire.

== Political career ==
Brudenell-Bruce was returned to Parliament for Marlborough in 1832. He was a Lord of the Bedchamber to William IV from 1834 to 1835. In 1841 he was sworn of the Privy Council and appointed Vice-Chamberlain of the Household under Sir Robert Peel, a post he held until the government fell in 1846. He returned to the same office in December 1852 in Lord Aberdeen's coalition government. He continued in the post also when Lord Palmerston became prime minister in 1855, finally resigning in 1858. He remained MP for Marlborough until 1878, when he succeeded his elder brother in the marquessate and entered the House of Lords. In 1884 he was made Lord-Lieutenant of Berkshire, a post he held until his death two years later.

=== Family ===
Lord Ailesbury married Hon. Louisa Elizabeth Horsley Beresford (1814–1891), second daughter of John Beresford, 2nd Baron Decies, on 25 November 1834. They had seven children:

- Lady Louisa Caroline Brudenell-Bruce (3 October 1836 - 7 December 1894), married Sir Henry Meux, 2nd Baronet.
- Lady Ernestine Mary Brudenell-Bruce (15 March 1847 - 27 December 1936), married William Hare, 3rd Earl of Listowel.
- George John Brudenell-Bruce (15 May 1839 – 28 May 1868), married Lady Evelyn Mary Craven, daughter of William Craven, 2nd Earl of Craven and had issue George Brudenell-Bruce, 4th Marquess of Ailesbury.
- James Ernest Brudenell-Bruce (30 June 1840 – 21 June 1876), no issue.
- Henry Augustus Brudenell-Bruce, 5th Marquess of Ailesbury (11 April 1842 – 10 March 1911).
- Commodore Lord Robert Thomas Brudenell-Bruce (25 January 1845 – 15 February 1912), married Emma Leigh and had issue.
- Major Lord Charles Frederick Brudenell-Bruce (4 March 1849 – 31 May 1936), married Margaret Renshaw (d. 1913), had one adopted daughter, Pleasance Moore Brown.

Lord Ailesbury died at Tottenham House, Savernake, Wiltshire, in October 1886, aged 75, and was buried at Great Bedwyn, Wiltshire. His grandson George succeeded to the marquessate. The Marchioness of Ailesbury died in October 1891, aged 77, and was also buried at Great Bedwyn.

Parliament of the United Kingdom
Preceded by Thomas Sotheron-Estcourt; William John Bankes	Member of Parliament for Marlborough; 1832–1878; With: Henry Bingham Baring 1832–1868 (representation reduced to one member 1868)	Succeeded by Lord Charles Bruce
Political offices
Preceded by Earl of Belfast	Vice-Chamberlain of the Household; 1841–1846	Succeeded by Lord Edward Howard
Preceded by Viscount Newport	Vice-Chamberlain of the Household; 1852–1858	Succeeded by Viscount Newport
Honorary titles
Preceded by The Earl of Craven	Lord Lieutenant of Berkshire; 1884–1886	Succeeded by The Lord Wantage
Peerage of the United Kingdom
Preceded by George Brudenell-Bruce	Marquess of Ailesbury; 1878–1886	Succeeded by George Brudenell-Bruce
