= Edward Fitzalan-Howard =

Edward Fitzalan-Howard may refer to:

- Edward Fitzalan-Howard, 1st Baron Howard of Glossop (1818–1883), British politician
- Edward Fitzalan-Howard, 18th Duke of Norfolk (born 1956), British peer
