= Orlando Bridgeman, 3rd Earl of Bradford =

British courtier and politician (1819–1898)

The Right Honourable The Earl of Bradford PC DL
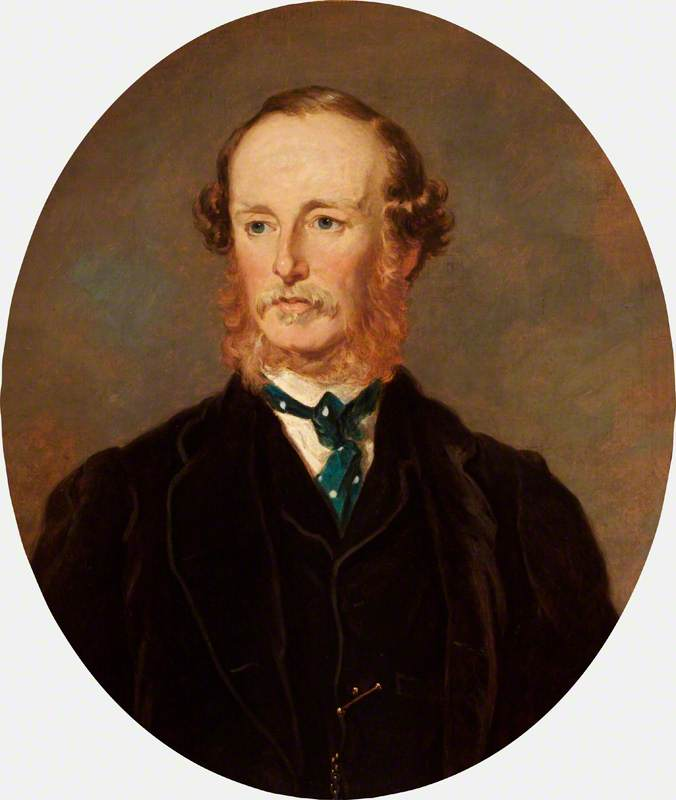

Member of the House of Lords
- Lord Temporal
- In office 22 March 1865 – 9 March 1898
- Preceded by: The 2nd Earl of Bradford
- Succeeded by: The 4th Earl of Bradford

Master of the Horse
- In office 7 March 1874 – 21 April 1880
- Monarch: Victoria
- Prime Minister: Benjamin Disraeli
- Preceded by: The Marquess of Ailesbury
- Succeeded by: The Duke of Westminster
- In office 1 July 1885 – 28 January 1886
- Monarch: Victoria
- Prime Minister: The Marquess of Salisbury
- Preceded by: The Duke of Westminster
- Succeeded by: The Earl of Cork

Personal details
- Born: Orlando George Charles Bridgeman; 24 April 1819 Nottingham Place, Marylebone, London, England
- Died: 9 March 1898 (aged 78) Weston Park, Staffordshire, England
- Party: Conservative
- Spouse(s): Hon. Selina Weld-Forester (d. 1894)
- Children: 4
- Parent(s): George Bridgeman, 2nd Earl of Bradford; Georgina Moncreiffe
- Education: Trinity College, Cambridge
- Other titles: 4th Baron Bradford; 8th Baronet (of Great Lever)

Orlando George Charles Bridgeman, 3rd Earl of Bradford (24 April 1819 – 9 March 1898), styled Viscount Newport between 1825 and 1865, was a British courtier and Conservative politician. In a ministerial career spanning over thirty years, he notably served as Lord Chamberlain of the Household between 1866 and 1868 and as Master of the Horse between 1874 and 1880 and again between 1885 and 1886.

== Background and education ==
Bridgeman was born at Nottingham Place, Marylebone, London, the eldest son of George Bridgeman, 2nd Earl of Bradford, and his wife Georgina Elizabeth Moncreiffe, daughter of Sir Thomas Moncreiffe, 5th Baronet. He was educated at Harrow and Trinity College, Cambridge. He became known by the courtesy title Viscount Newport when his father succeeded in the earldom of Bradford in 1825 when he also inherited 21,000 acres across England.

== Political career ==
Lord Newport was elected Member of Parliament for Shropshire South in 1842. In February 1852, he was appointed Vice-Chamberlain of the Household in Lord Derby's first administration, a post he held until the fall of the government in December of the same year, and again from 1858 to 1859 in Derby's second administration. He was admitted to the Privy Council in 1852. In 1865, he succeeded his father in the earldom and entered the House of Lords. When Derby became prime minister for the third time in 1866, Lord Bradford was made Lord Chamberlain of the Household, an office he retained until December 1868, the last year under the premiership of Benjamin Disraeli. He again served under Disraeli as Master of the Horse between 1874 and 1880 and held the same office from 1885 to 1886 in Lord Salisbury's first administration.

Apart from his political career, Lord Bradford was a Deputy Lieutenant of Staffordshire and served as Lord-Lieutenant of Shropshire between 1875 and 1896. He served in the North Shropshire Yeomanry Cavalry, beginning as cornet in 1839, promoted captain in 1844, and resigning in 1869. He was appointed Honorary Colonel of the 1st Volunteer Battalion of the King's Shropshire Light Infantry on 20 March 1878.

== Sport interests ==
Lord Bradford was a Thoroughbred racehorse owner, with colours of white, scarlet sleeves, and a black cap borne by his jockeys. He won the Cesarewitch at Newmarket in 1865 with Salpinctes and, in 1879, with Chippendale who came second in two successive races for the same cup. He ultimately won the 1892 Derby with Sir Hugo.

Invited by William Penny Brookes, he was President of the Wenlock Olympian Society in 1874, when Much Wenlock hosted the National Olympian Games.

== Marriage and issue ==
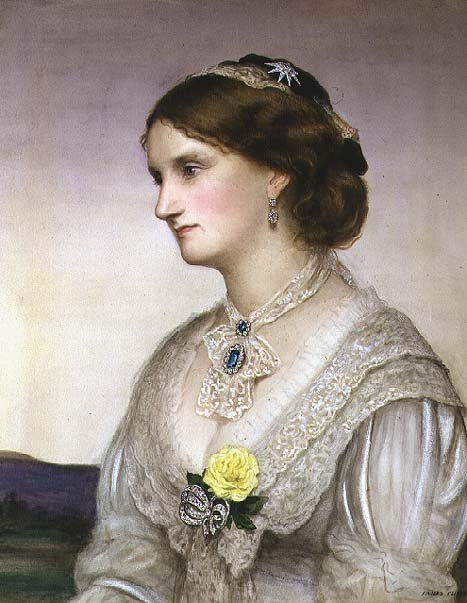
Selina, the Countess of Bradford, by Edward Clifford, 1876

Lord Bradford married the Hon. Selina Weld-Forester, daughter of Cecil Weld-Forester, 1st Baron Forester, on 10 April 1844. They had six children:

- George Cecil Orlando Bridgeman, 4th Earl of Bradford (1845–1915)
- Brigadier Hon. Francis Charles Bridgeman (1846–1917)
- Hon. Gerald Orlando Manners Bridgeman (5 November 1847 – 14 April 1870), died unmarried
- Hon. Rowland Alexander Somerset Bridgeman (12 February 1852 – 2 July 1864), died young
- Lady Mabel Selina Bridgeman (13 November 1855 – 28 January 1933), married Colonel William Kenyon-Slaney on 22 February 1887
- Lady Florence Katharine Bridgeman (1859–1943), married the 5th Earl of Harewood on 5 November 1881

The Countess was noted for "intelligence, gaiety and sympathy". Benjamin Disraeli was deeply attached to both Lady Bradford and her sister Anne, Countess of Chesterfield. After his wife's death in 1872, his feelings seem to have become even warmer and it has been suggested that he would have proposed marriage had Lady Bradford been free to marry.

The Countess of Bradford died in November 1894. Lord Bradford died after a long illness at Weston Park, Staffordshire, in March 1898, aged 78. He was buried on 12 March 1898 at Weston-under-Lizard. His eldest son, George, succeeded in the earldom.

== Arms ==
Coat of arms of Orlando Bridgeman, 3rd Earl of Bradford
Coronet That of an earl. Crest A demi-lion rampant argent holding between the paws a wreath of laurel proper. Escutcheon Sable, ten plates, four, three, two, and one, on a chief argent a lion passant ermines. Supporters Two leopards, guardant gules pelletée. Motto Nec temere, nec I timide (Neither rashley nor timidly).

Parliament of the United Kingdom
Preceded by Earl of Darlington; Robert Clive	Member of Parliament for South Shropshire; 1842–1865; With: Robert Clive 1842–1854; Robert Windsor-Clive 1854–1859; Sir Baldwin Leighton, Bt 1859–1865	Succeeded by Sir Baldwin Leighton, Bt; Sir Percy Egerton Herbert
Political offices
Preceded by Lord Edward Howard	Vice-Chamberlain of the Household; February–December 1852	Succeeded by Lord Ernest Bruce
Preceded by Lord Ernest Bruce	Vice-Chamberlain of the Household; 1858–1859	Succeeded by Viscount Castlerosse
Preceded by The Viscount Sydney	Lord Chamberlain; 1866–1868	Succeeded by The Viscount Sydney
Preceded by The Marquess of Ailesbury	Master of the Horse; 1874–1880	Succeeded by The Duke of Westminster
Preceded by The Duke of Westminster	Master of the Horse; 1885–1886	Succeeded by The Earl of Cork
Honorary titles
Preceded by The Viscount Hill	Lord Lieutenant of Shropshire; 1875–1896	Succeeded by The Earl of Powis
Peerage of the United Kingdom
Preceded by George Bridgeman	Earl of Bradford; 2nd creation 1865–1898; Member of the House of Lords (1865–1898)	Succeeded by George Bridgeman
Peerage of Great Britain
Preceded by George Bridgeman	Baron Bradford; 1865–1898	Succeeded by George Bridgeman
Baronetage of England
Preceded by George Bridgeman	Baronet of Great Lever; 1865–1898	Succeeded by George Bridgeman
