= Vice-Chamberlain of the Household =

Position in the British Royal Household

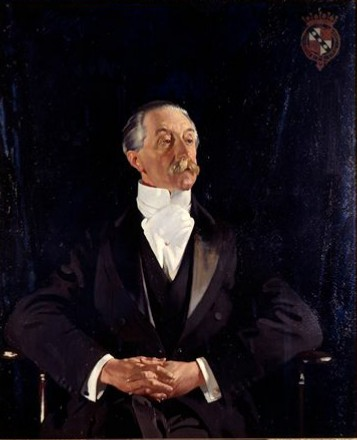
Charles Spencer, 6th Earl Spencer; Vice-Chamberlain of the Household 1892–1895

The Vice-Chamberlain of the Household is a member of the Royal Household of the Sovereign of the United Kingdom. The officeholder is usually a senior government whip in the British House of Commons ranking third or fourth after the Chief Whip and the Deputy Chief Whip. The Vice-Chamberlain is the Deputy to the Lord Chamberlain of the Household and, like the Lord Chamberlain, carries a white staff of office when on duty on state occasions.

The Vice-Chamberlain's main roles are to compile a daily private report to the Sovereign on proceedings in the House of Commons and to relay addresses from the Commons to the Sovereign and back. As a member of the Royal Household, the Vice-Chamberlain accompanies the Sovereign and Royal Household at certain diplomatic and social events, particularly the annual garden party at Buckingham Palace. When the Sovereign goes in procession to the Palace of Westminster for the State Opening of Parliament, the Vice-Chamberlain stays and is "held captive" at Buckingham Palace. This custom began with the Stuart Restoration (1660), because of the previous parliament's role in the beheading of Charles I. During their captivity the Vice-Chamberlain is offered light refreshments by the Lord Chamberlain as they watch the speech on television.

During the latter part of her reign, the Vice-Chamberlain sent a daily email to Elizabeth II. The Queen was regarded as well informed about British political affairs as she typically read daily newspapers and was a listener of the Today programme on BBC Radio 4. The late queen's private secretary told Andrew MacKay, who held the post in 1996, to include more "gossip and the inside track" as his initial efforts had been "rather stilted". MacKay turned his efforts into a "who's up, who's down" for the queen. Anne Milton, who held the post in 2014 and 2015, looked for things that "might amuse" the queen and to "give a bit of colour" to the proceedings in the House of Commons. The Queen reportedly told Jim Fitzpatrick, who held the post of Vice-Chamberlain between 2003 and 2005 to send her news which "doesn't make the press" and that he felt encouraged to be "frank and transparent" with her due to the privacy of their communications. Emails began to be sent to the Queen at Buckingham Palace in 2014; the dispatches had previously been collected by a messenger.

Notable holders of the office include Sir George Carteret, Lord Hervey, the Earl of Harrington, the Earl Spencer, Michael Stewart and Bernard Weatherill.

== List of Vice-Chamberlains of the Household ==
Name	Entered office	Left office	Notes	Reference
Sir Charles Somerset	1501	Unknown	Lord Chamberlain from 1509; created Baron Herbert in 1504 and Earl of Worcester in 1514	
Sir Robert Wingfield	1521	Unknown		
William Sandys, 1st Baron Sandys of the Vyne	Unknown	1526	Became Lord Chamberlain	
Sir John Gage	1526	1533	Lord Chamberlain from 1553	
Sir William Kingston	1536	1539		
Sir Anthony Wingfield	1539	1550		
Sir Thomas D'Arcy	1550	1551	Became Lord Chamberlain; created Baron Darcy of Chiche in 1551	
Sir John Gates	1551	Unknown		
Sir Henry Jerningham	1553	1557		
Sir Henry Bedingfeld	1557	1558		
Sir Edward Rogers	1558	1559		
Sir Francis Knollys	1559	Unknown		
Sir Christopher Hatton	1577	1587		
Sir Thomas Heneage	1587	1595		
Sir John Stanhope, from 1605 Baron Stanhope	1601	1616		
Sir John Digby, from 1618 Baron Digby and from 1622 Earl of Bristol	1616	1625		
Sir Dudley Carleton	1625	1626	Created Baron Carleton in 1626 and Viscount Dorchester in 1628	
Sir Humphrey May	1626	1630		
Sir Thomas Jermyn	1630	1639		
George Goring, 1st Baron Goring	1639	1644	Created Earl of Norwich in 1644	
Vacant
Sir George Carteret, 1st Baronet	1660	1680	Notionally held the office from 1647	
Henry Savile	1680	1687		
James Porter	1687	1689		
Sir John Lowther, Bt	1689	1694	Created Viscount Lonsdale in 1679	
Peregrine Bertie	1694	1706		
Thomas Coke	1706	1727		
William Stanhope	1727	1730	Created Baron Harrington in 1730 and Earl of Harrington in 1742	
John Hervey, 2nd Baron Hervey	1730	1740	Became Lord Privy Seal	
Lord Sidney Beauclerk	1740	1742		
William Finch	1742	1765		
George Villiers, Viscount Villiers	1765	1770	Succeeded as Earl of Jersey in 1769	
Thomas Robinson, from 1770 Lord Grantham	1770	1771		
John Montagu, Viscount Hinchingbrooke	1771	1782	Succeeded as Earl of Sandwich in 1792	
George Waldegrave, Viscount Chewton	1782	1784	Succeeded as Earl Waldegrave in 1784	
George Herbert, Lord Herbert	1784	1794	Succeeded as Earl of Pembroke in 1794	
Charles Francis Greville	1794	1804 or 1809		
Lord John Thynne	1804 or 1809	1812	Succeeded as Baron Carteret in 1838	
Francis Seymour-Conway, Earl of Yarmouth	1812	1812	Succeeded as Marquess of Hertford in 1822	
Robert Jocelyn, Viscount Jocelyn, from 1820 Earl of Roden	1812	1821		
James Graham, Marquess of Graham	1821	1827	Succeeded as Duke of Montrose in 1836	
Sir Samuel Hulse	1827	1830		
George Chichester, Earl of Belfast	1830	1834	First period in office; succeeded as Marquess of Donegall in 1844	
Frederick Stewart, Viscount Castlereagh	1834	1835	Succeeded as Marquess of Londonderry in 1854	
Lord Charles FitzRoy	1835	1838		
George Chichester, Earl of Belfast	1838	1841	Second period in office; succeeded as Marquess of Donegall in 1844	
Lord Ernest Brudenell-Bruce	1841	1846	First period in office; succeeded as Marquess of Ailesbury in 1878	
Lord Edward Howard	1846	1852	Created Baron Howard of Glossop in 1869	
Orlando Bridgeman, Viscount Newport	1852	1852	First period in office; Lord Chamberlain from 1866; succeeded as Earl of Bradford in 1865	
Lord Ernest Brudenell-Bruce	1852	1858	Second period in office; succeeded as Marquess of Ailesbury in 1878	
Orlando Bridgeman, Viscount Newport	1858	1859	Second period in office; Lord Chamberlain from 1866; succeeded as Earl of Bradford in 1865	
Valentine Browne, Viscount Castlerosse	1859	1866	First period in office; succeeded as Earl of Kenmare in 1871	
Lord Claud Hamilton	1866	1868		
Valentine Browne, Viscount Castlerosse, from 1871 Earl of Kenmare	1868	1872	Second period in office; Lord Chamberlain from 1880	
Lord Richard Grosvenor	1872	1874	Created Baron Stalbridge in 1886	
George Barrington, 7th Viscount Barrington	1874	1880		
Lord Charles Bruce	1880	1885		
William Legge, Viscount Lewisham	1885	1886	First period in office; succeeded as Earl of Dartmouth in 1881	
Frederick Lambart, Viscount Kilcoursie	1886	1886	Succeeded as Earl of Cavan in 1887	
William Legge, Viscount Lewisham, from 1891 Earl of Dartmouth	1886	1891	Second period in office	
Lord Burghley	1891	1892	Succeeded as Marquess of Exeter in 1895	
Charles Spencer	1892	1895		
Ailwyn Fellowes	1895	1900	Created Baron Ailwyn in 1921	
Sir Alexander Acland-Hood, Bt	1900	1902	Created Lord St Audries in 1911	
Frederick Glyn, 4th Baron Wolverton	1902	1905		
Wentworth Beaumont, from 1907 Lord Allendale	1905	1907	Created Viscount Allendale in 1911	
John Fuller, from 1910 Sir John, 1st Baronet	1907	1911		
Geoffrey Howard	1911	1915		
Cecil Beck	1915	1917		
William Dudley Ward	1917	1922		
Douglas Hacking	1922	1924	First period in office; created Baron Hacking in 1945	
John Davison	1924	1924		
Douglas Hacking	1924	1925	Second period in office; created Baron Hacking in 1945	
George Hennessy, from 1927 Sir George, 1st Baronet	1925	1928	Became Treasurer of the Household; created Baron Windlesham in 1937	
Frederick Thomson, from 1929 Sir Frederick, 1st Baronet	1928	1929	First period in office	
Jack Hayes	1929	1931		
Sir Frederick Thomson, 1st Baronet	1931	1931	Second period in office	
Sir George Penny	1931	1932	Became Comptroller of the Household; created Viscount Marchwood in 1945	
Sir Victor Warrender, Bt	1932	1935	Became Comptroller of the Household; created Baron Bruntisfield in 1942	
Sir Lambert Ward, 1st Baronet	1935	1935	Became Comptroller of the Household	
George Davies, from 1936 Sir George	1935	1936	Became Comptroller of the Household	
Arthur Hope	1937	1937	Became Treasurer of the Household; succeeded as Baron Rankeillour in 1949	
Ronald Cross	1937	1938		
Robert Grimston	1938	1939	Became Treasurer of the Household; created Baron Grimston of Westbury in 1952	
James Edmondson	1939	1942	Became Treasurer of the Household	
William Boulton, from 1944 Sir William, 1st Baronet	1942	1944		
Arthur Young	1944	1945		
Julian Snow	1945	1946	Created Lord Burntwood in 1970	
Michael Stewart	1946	1947	Created Lord Stewart of Fulham in 1979	
Ernest Popplewell	1947	1951	Created Lord Popplewell in 1966	
Henry Studholme	1951	1956		
Richard Thompson	1956	1957		
Peter Legh	1957	1959	Became Treasurer of the Household; succeeded as Lord Newton in 1960	
Edward Wakefield	1959	1960	Became Treasurer of the Household	
Richard Brooman-White	1960	1960		
Graeme Finlay	1960	1964		
William Whitlock	1964	1966		
Jack McCann	1966	1967		
Charles Morris	1967	1969	Became Treasurer of the Household	
Alan Fitch	1969	1970		
Jasper More	1970	1971		
Bernard Weatherill	1971	1972	Became Comptroller of the Household; created Lord Weatherill in 1992	
Walter Clegg	1972	1973	Became Comptroller of the Household	
Paul Hawkins	1973	1974		
Don Concannon	1974	1974		
James Hamilton	1974	1978	Became Comptroller of the Household	
Donald Coleman	1978	1979		
Hon. Anthony Berry	1979	1981	Became Comptroller of the Household	
Carol Mather	1981	1983	Became Comptroller of the Household	
Robert Boscawen	1983	1986	Became Comptroller of the Household	
Tristan Garel-Jones	1986	1988	Became Comptroller of the Household; created Lord Garel-Jones in 1997	
Michael Neubert	1988	1988		
Tony Durant	1988	1990		
David Lightbown	1990	1990	Became Comptroller of the Household	
John Mark Taylor	1990	1992		
Sydney Chapman	1992	1995		
Timothy Kirkhope	1995	1996		
Andrew MacKay	1996	1996		
Derek Conway	1996	1997		
Janet Anderson	1997	1998		
Graham Allen	1998	2001		
Gerry Sutcliffe	2001	2003		
Jim Fitzpatrick	2003	2005		
John Heppell	2005	2007		
Liz Blackman	2007	2008		
Claire Ward	2008	2009		
Helen Jones	2009	2010		
Mark Francois	2010	2012		
Greg Knight	2012	2013	Previously Treasurer of the Household 1993-96	
Desmond Swayne	2013	2014		
Anne Milton	2014	2015		
Kris Hopkins	2015	2016		
Julian Smith	2016	2017	Became Treasurer of the Household	
Chris Heaton-Harris	2017	2018	Became Comptroller of the Household	
Mark Spencer	2018	2018	Became Comptroller of the Household	
Andrew Stephenson	2018	2019		
Craig Whittaker	2019	2019		
Stuart Andrew	2019	2020	Became Treasurer of the Household	
Marcus Jones	2020	2021	Became Comptroller of the Household	
James Morris	2021	2022		
Michael Tomlinson	2022	2022		
Jo Churchill	2022	2023		
Stuart Anderson	2023	2024		
Samantha Dixon	2024	2025		
Lilian Greenwood	2025	2025		
Nic Dakin	2025	2026		
Emma Foody	2026	present		

== List of Shadow Vice-Chamberlains of the Household ==
- Jessica Morden (2020–2023)
- Vacant (2023–present)
