= Charles Boyle, Viscount Dungarvan =

Anglo-Irish politician (1729–1759)

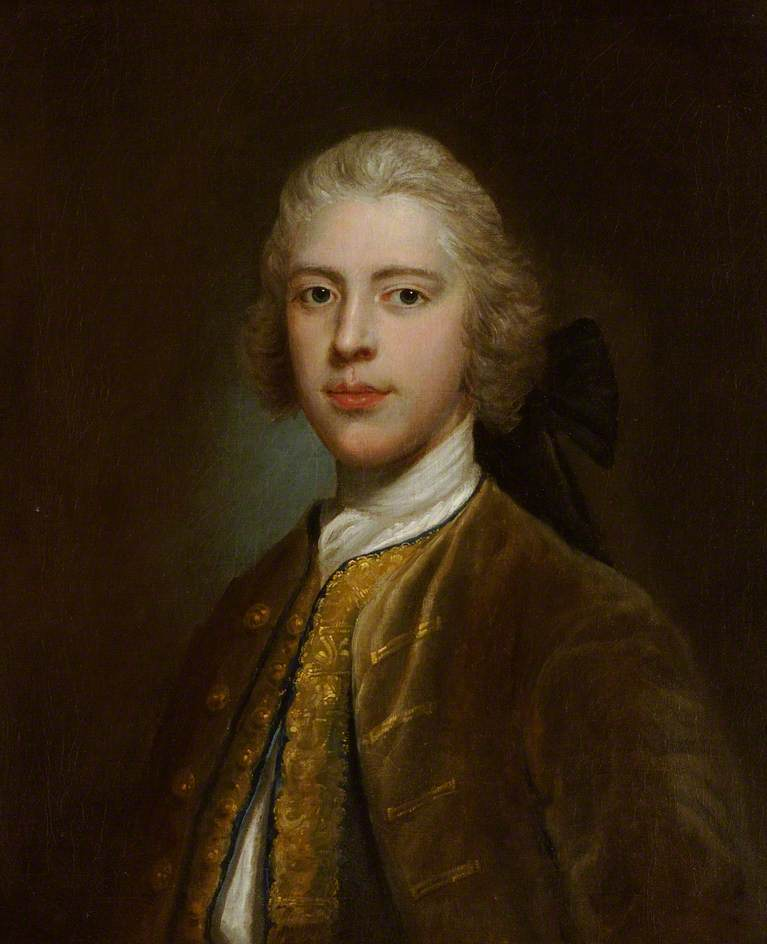
Portrait of Dungarvan by Arthur Pond

Charles Boyle, Viscount Dungarvan (27 January 1729 – 16 September 1759) was an Anglo-Irish politician.

Boyle was the eldest son of John Boyle, 5th Earl of Cork and his first wife, Henrietta, daughter of George Hamilton, 1st Earl of Orkney.

He was the Member of Parliament for County Cork in the Irish House of Commons between 1756 and his death in 1759.

In 1753 he married Susanna Hoare, the daughter of Henry Hoare. They had one child, Henrietta Boyle. As Boyle predeceased his father, the earldom was inherited by Boyle's younger brother, Hamilton Boyle.

Parliament of Ireland
Preceded by Henry Boyle; Arthur Hyde	Member of Parliament for County Cork; 1756–1759; With: Arthur Hyde	Succeeded by Richard Townsend; Arthur Hyde
