= Charles Brudenell-Bruce, 1st Marquess of Ailesbury =

British peer and politician

The Most Honourable The Marquess of Ailesbury KT
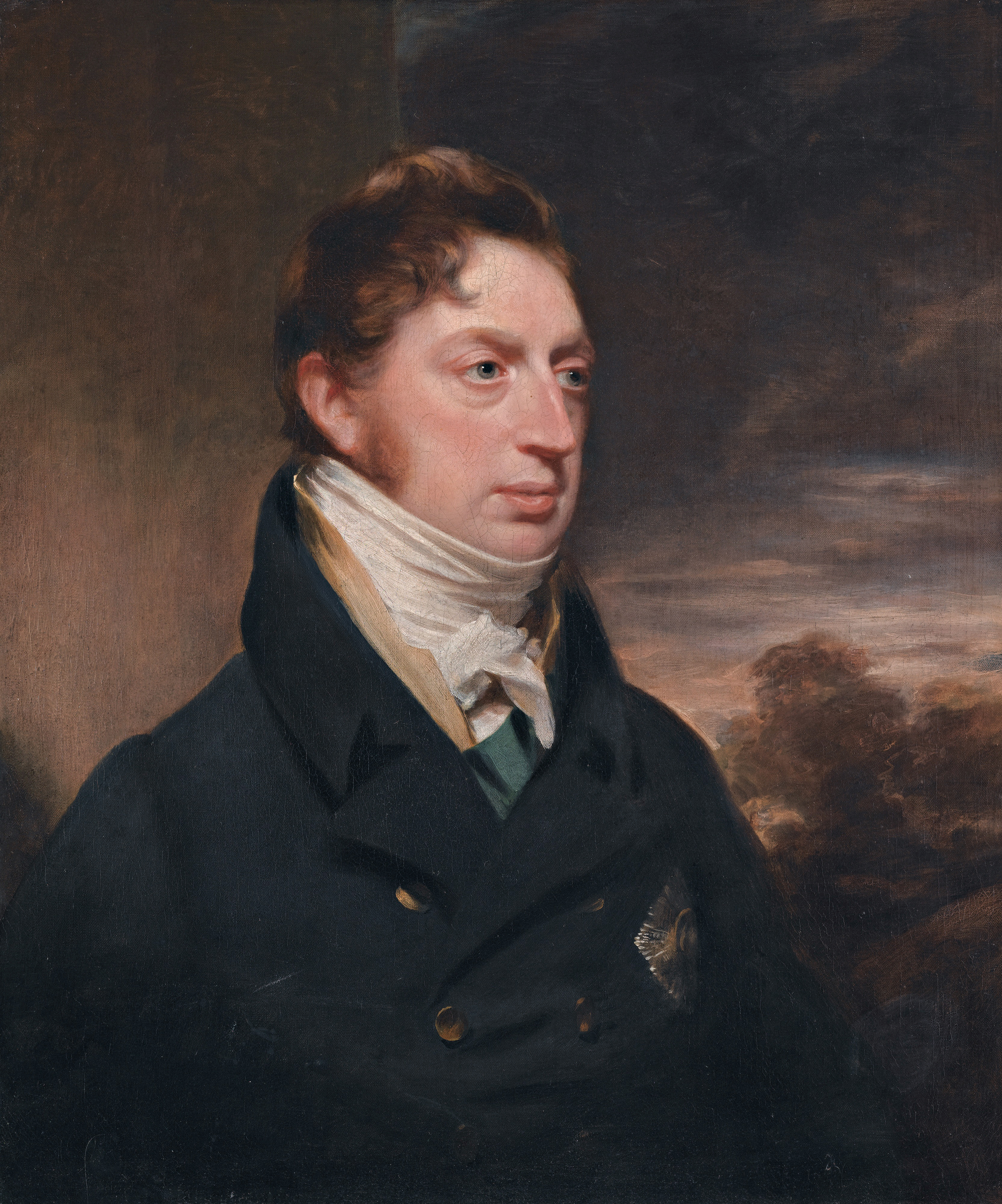
- Charles Brudenell-Bruce, 1st Marquess of Ailesbury (William Beechey)

Member of Parliament for Marlborough
- In office 1801–1814
- Succeeded by: Edward Stopford; Hon. William Hill

Member of the Great Britain Parliament for Marlborough
- In office 1796–1800
- Preceded by: Thomas Bruce; Earl of Dalkeith

Personal details
- Born: Charles Brudenell-Bruce; 14 February 1773
- Died: 4 January 1856 (aged 82) Tottenham, Wiltshire, England
- Spouses: Henrietta Maria Hill (m. 1793; died 1831); Maria Elizabeth Clarke (m. 1833)
- Children: 5, including George, Ernest, and Charles
- Parents: Thomas Brudenell-Bruce, 1st Earl of Ailesbury; Susanna Hoare
- Education: University of Leyden

Military service
- Allegiance: 1792–1800 (Great Britain) 1800–1827 (British Empire)
- Branch/service: Royal Wiltshire Yeomanry
- Years of service: 1792–1827
- Rank: Colonel

Charles Brudenell-Bruce, 1st Marquess of Ailesbury, KT (14 February 1773 – 4 January 1856), styled The Honourable Charles Brudenell-Bruce from birth until 1783, Lord Bruce until 1814 and The Earl of Ailesbury until 1821, was a British peer and politician.

== Background ==
Brudenell-Bruce was the third and only surviving son of Thomas Brudenell-Bruce, 1st Earl of Ailesbury and his first wife, Susanna, daughter and coheiress of Henry Hoare, banker, of Stourhead, and the widow of Viscount Dungarvan. He was educated privately abroad in Italy from 1783 before being sent up to the University of Leyden.

A traditional description of Lord Bruce was provided by Lady Malmesbury when they met on several occasions on the Grand Tour in 1791.

"quite Lord Ailesbury just out of the shell – which, by the by, is no bad comparison, for they are like unfledged turkeys... a sad goose, but a good humoured creature and so desperately in love with the Duchess de Fleury it is quite melancholy, Lord Malmesbury says he is in love like a rabbit with a bunch of parsley".

In the 1760s his father had laid out the gardens at Tottenham Park with the help of Lancelot "Capability" Brown. Tottenham Park was of great extent and moderate beauty. Formal avenues were planted leading up to the house, in the extensive Savernake Forest, which surrounded the cluster of aristocratic estates in east Wiltshire. The valley was good-grade farmland, where Lord Bruce's client-burgesses of Marlborough had rights to graze. His father erected tall statuary in a garden within a flat parkland landscape. When he inherited in 1814, Charles was determined to re-build and enlarge the house to a design by Thomas Cundy. The Marquess's ancestral "Rooms in the woods" distinguished his High Tory politics.

== Military career ==
In March 1792, he joined the Berkshire Militia as an ensign. In 1796 he was appointed captain of the Marlborough Yeomanry. He was promoted to colonel the Wiltshire Yeomanry in 1797. He was colonel of the Wiltshire Militia in 1811–27, a largely honorary appointment, although his record was one of sabre-rattling against the French, behaving for the most part like an Ultra.

== Political career ==
Coats of Arms of Charles Brudenell-Bruce

From an early age his father wanted him to have management control of the family's electoral interest at Marlborough, in which place he continued until inheriting his father's estates. He was Member of Parliament for Marlborough from 1796 until 19 April 1814, when he succeeded to his father's titles of Baron Bruce of Tottenham House and the earldom of Ailesbury.

Lord Bruce was not a regular attender of debates in the Commons. He frequently disappointed the government's attempts to whip his vote. On 19 February 1801, he supported an opposition motion calling for an inquiry into the failed Ferrol Expedition. He joined only twenty other MPs in rejecting the Peace of Amiens on 14 May 1802. Pitt's Irish Secretary imagined that Bruce was a Tory supporter of the navy, but on every vote, he opposed the Orders of the Day in the Commons. From 3 June 1803 to March 1804, there were numerous votes in which Bruce did not line up with Pitt's ministry, and he continued this record into the brief Addington ministry.

However, Bruce did support the Tory Irish Volunteer bill on 16 April 1804. Thereafter he returned to the Pittite loyalties opposing Melville's Censure motion on 18 April 1805. On Pitt's death he was among those Tory MPs who foregathered to discuss the future. Grenville chose to repeal the Additional Forces Acts 1803, to which Bruce raised an objection as the war against France was raging in Europe, specifically with reference to the debate on 30 April 1806, being only one of thirty to vote against. He raised an objection to the government on the election petition for Hampshire for 13 February 1807. Bruce was "adverse" to the abolition of the slave trade when it was debated in the Commons taking the traditional laissez-faire economic principles; omitting to recall it was a new century.

On 16 March 1807 Bruce was arrested and taken into custody for defaulting on payment of fees. The House banned him from sitting, as the law prohibited bankrupts from being members. Nevertheless, he had the nerve to apply to the Duke of Portland's administration for a marquessate, which was needless to say rejected out of hand.

Bruce supported the Scheldt Question that developed in 1810 from the Walcheren Expedition of 1809. Having destroyed the League of Armed Neutrality, the Royal Navy decided to prevent the Dutch from becoming agents of Bonapartism. The Admiralty enquiry had to determine whether the loss of life had been worthwhile. And votes were taken on 23 February, and 30 March 1810 to this effect. The Whiggish aristocrats despaired of his ambiguous voting record. He supported Spencer Perceval's attempts to pass a Regency bill to regularize Prince George's assumption of the monarch's duties and civil list on New Year's Day 1811.

The general election saw a convincing victory for the new Liberal Tory Prime Minister Lord Liverpool, caused by Perceval's assassination. The following year he voted against the Catholic Relief bill on 24 May 1813. Bruce became firmly associated with the Ultras. He adhered rigidly to the whig constitution, opposing any relaxation of the franchise, and became associated with the Duke of Wellington's Tories. Ailesbury left the Commons on 19 April 1814, when he inherited the courtesy earldom of Ailesbury, and the barony Bruce of Tottenham, co. Wiltshire.

=== In the House of Lords ===
Ailesbury was appointed a Knight of the Thistle on 20 May 1819. Lord Brudenell-Bruce was raised to a number of peerages being created 1st Viscount Savernake of Savernake Forest, 1st Earl Bruce of Whorlton, co. York and, 1st Marquess of Ailesbury on 17 July 1821, with many other peers for the occasion of George IV's coronation, after much lobbying of the new king's patronage, whose tutor his father had been.

Ailesbury was lord and master of all he surveyed in the borough of Marlborough, holding virtually all the voters in his pocket, so alleged the whig reformer, Henry Hobhouse MP in the Great Reform bill debates of 1831. He signed the Earl of Mansfield's dissentient protest during the third reading of the bill. In 1843 Ailesbury voted against a bill to remove restrictions on Jews from becoming members. He was amongst a large number of Tory peers in the die-hard lobbies against extending the franchise.

Lord Ailesbury was on the independent benches in the House of Lords, but he had liberal leanings, supporting the Whig governments. On 1 Feb 1849, he responded to the Queen's loyal address "...if not that, pursuing so unusual a course, he might appear to be acting disrespectfully towards their lordships, and perhaps to some degree towards Her Majesty..." He supported the reformist agenda of the Whig government, particularly in foreign relations. He was strongly in favour of Palmerston's gunboat diplomacy, and supported a joint task force with France to bombard Naples and Sicily to end the atrocities there in 1849. He would not propose any reductions in the army numbers, because adequate defences were needed for each colony far in excess of those present. He required the "presence of the noble and gallant Duke" with no reduction in the Artillery. Indeed, he thought the artillery should be supplemented by cuts to the infantry. He agreed with the earl of Yarborough's warnings of revolutionary Europe posed to Britain. He encouraged adding to the powers of the Lord Lieutenant of Ireland and applauded the emergency powers introduced in 1848.

On 8 May, Lord Ailesbury appealed to the Lords to open their eyes to the realities of free trade. He called for the repeal of the Navigation Laws:

"The various colonies of this country first themselves aggrieved by the course pursued by the mother country with respect to the adoption of free trade measures, and they claimed as some compensation for the injury they had sustained, the removal of the burdens imposed upon them by the existing navigation laws."

Intercommunication was between all parts of the globe, so it was natural to allow sailors to trade their labour. It was essentially part of a free trade system that Lord Ailesbury wished to assert.

== Family ==
On 10 April 1793, Brudenell-Bruce married at Florence the Hon. Henrietta Maria Hill, daughter of Noel Hill. She died on 2 January 1831. They had six children:

- Charlotte Henrietta (Florence, 10 May 1794 – unknown date) and Lady Maria Carolina Ann (Florence, 10 May 1794 – 1835). Maria married Count de Mondreville or Montreville on 17 July 1819 in Paris.
- Lady Augusta Frederica (1795–1869), who married Frederick Wentworth, paternal grandson of Henry Vernon MP, and also great-grandson of Thomas Wentworth, 1st Earl of Strafford. They had two children, Henrietta (wife of Col. Arthur John Bethell Thellusson), and Thomas (husband of Lady Harriet Augusta de Burgh, daughter of Ulick de Burgh, 1st Marquess of Clanricarde).
- George William Frederick, later 2nd Marquess of Ailesbury (1804–1878).
- Lady Elizabeth (1807–1847), married H.E. Lensgreve Christian Danneskiold-Samsøe. Their children were Frederick and Henrietta, who married Henry Byng, later 4th Earl of Strafford.
- Lord Ernest Augustus Charles, later 3rd Marquess of Ailesbury (8 January 1811 – 1886).

After his wife's death in 1831, the Marquess settled his affairs. By deed, he put into trust his considerable estates for his eldest son: houses at Seymour Place and East Sheen in London, as well as a 99-year lease on lands in Wiltshire and Yorkshire. The allowance paid him also met mortgage charges on a debt of £104,000.

The Marquess married secondly Maria Elizabeth, second daughter of Hon Charles Tollemache, of Harrington, Northants (by his second wife, Gertrude Florinda Clarke, widow of Charles John Clarke, and daughter of Gen William Gardiner), 3rd son of John Manners MP of Hanby Hall, Lincs. Gertrude Florinda Gardiner was also a granddaughter of Louisa Tollemache, 7th Countess of Dysart. They were married on 20 August 1833 at Ham House, Petersham, Surrey. They had one son:

- Lord Charles William (1834–1897), a soldier and courtier.

She died at Petersham on 7 May 1893, aged 83.

On Lord Ailesbury's death in January 1856 at Tottenham Park, his titles passed to his eldest son, George. He was buried at Great Bedwyn churchyard. His will was proven in July 1856.

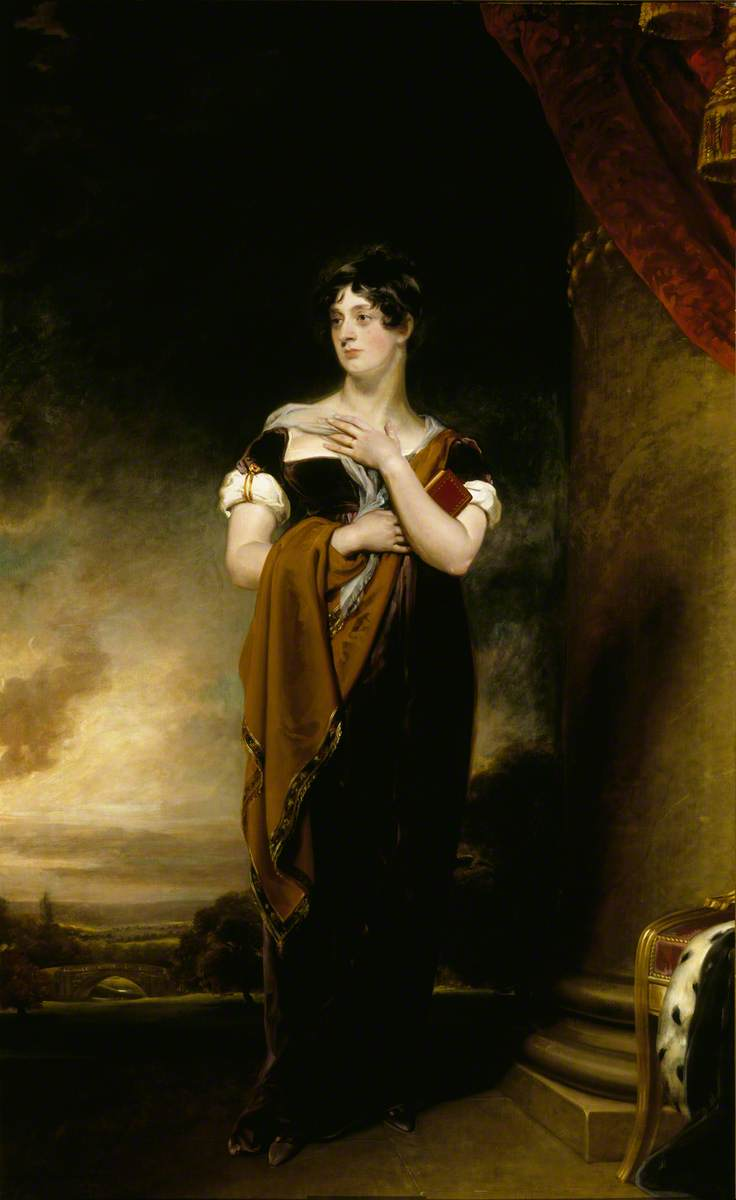
Henrietta Maria Hill, Marchioness of Ailesbury, by Thomas Lawrence

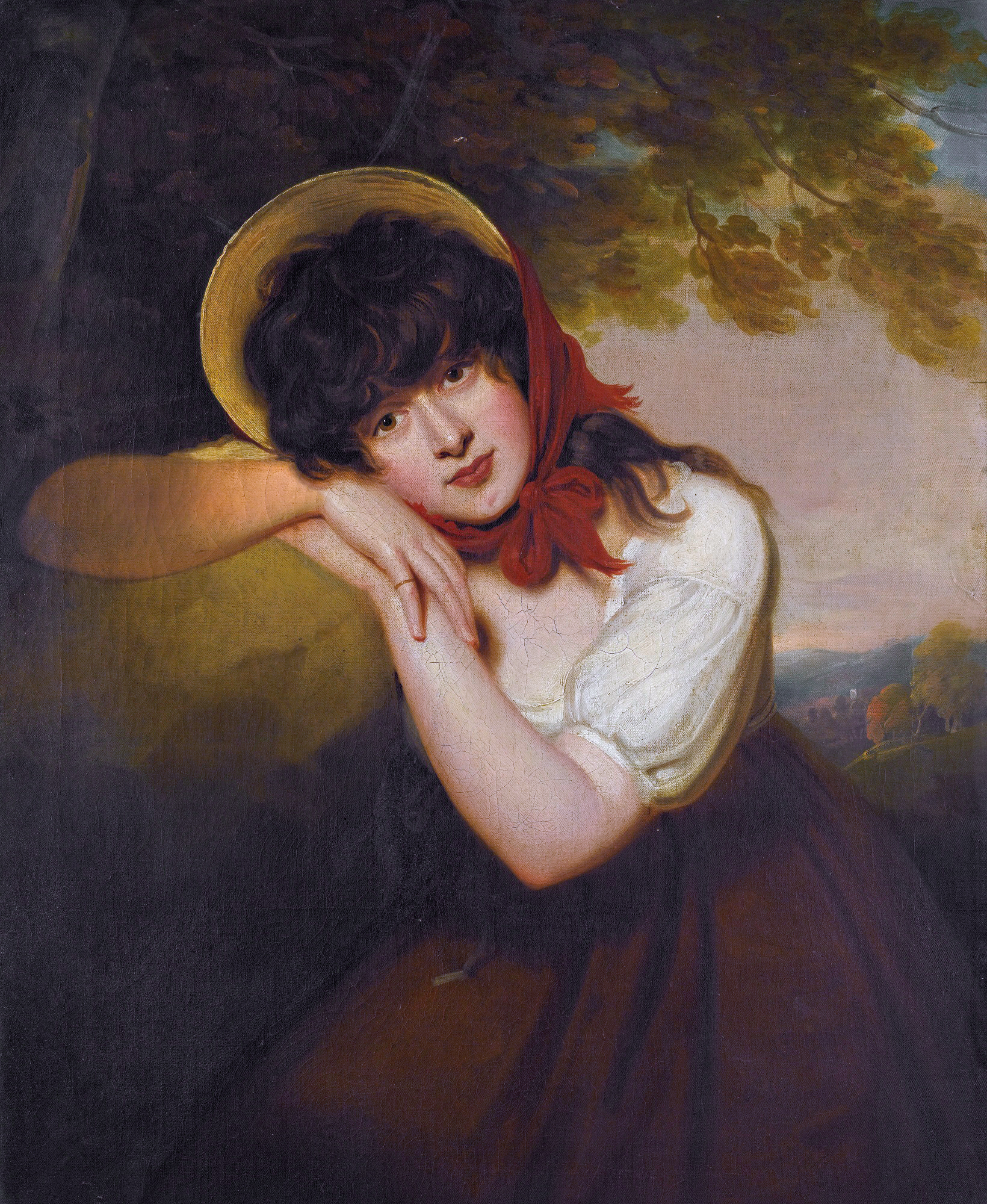
Maria Tollemache, later Marchioness of Ailesbury, by circle of Martin Archer Shee

== Sources ==
=== Manuscripts ===
- 1790–99: Continental travel diaries
- 1813–30: Letters to Sir R.J.Buxton
- 1824–31: Letters to his daughter, Mrs F.Wentworth
- Correspondence during the Grand Tour
- 1841–44: Correspondence – 10 terms – with Sir Robert Peel
- 1674–1985: Additional estate and family papers

=== References ===
- Thompson, F M L (1958). "The English landownership: The Ailesbury Trust 1832–56". The Economic History Review. 11 (1): 121–132.
- Mowl, Timothy (2004). Historic Gardens of Wiltshire. Stroud: Tempus. pp. 105–108.

=== Glossary ===
- WRO – Wiltshire Record Office
- WSHC – Wiltshire and Swindon History Centre
- BL – British Library
- HMC – Historical Manuscripts Commission
- NRA – National Register of Archives
- CUL – Cambridge University Library
- NRAS – National Register of Archives for Scotland.

Parliament of Great Britain
Preceded by Thomas Bruce; Earl of Dalkeith	Member of Parliament for Marlborough; 1796–1800; Served alongside: Hon. James Bruce 1796–1797; Robert Brudenell 1797–1800	Succeeded by Parliament of the United Kingdom
Parliament of the United Kingdom
Preceded by Parliament of Great Britain	Member of Parliament for Marlborough; 1801–1814; Served alongside: Robert Brudenell 1801–1802; James Leigh 1802–06; Earl of Dalkeith 1806–07; Viscount Stopford 1807–1810; Edward Stopford 1810–1814	Succeeded by Edward Stopford and Hon. William Hill
Peerage of Great Britain
Preceded by Thomas Brudenell-Bruce	Earl of Ailesbury; 1814–1856	Succeeded by George Brudenell-Bruce
Preceded by Thomas Brudenell-Bruce	Baron Bruce of Tottenham (descended by acceleration); 1814–1838	Succeeded by George Brudenell-Bruce
Peerage of the United Kingdom
New creation	Marquess of Ailesbury; 1821–1856	Succeeded by George Brudenell-Bruce
