= George Brudenell-Bruce, 2nd Marquess of Ailesbury =

British peer and politician (1804–1878)

The Most Honourable The Marquess of Ailesbury KG, PC, DL
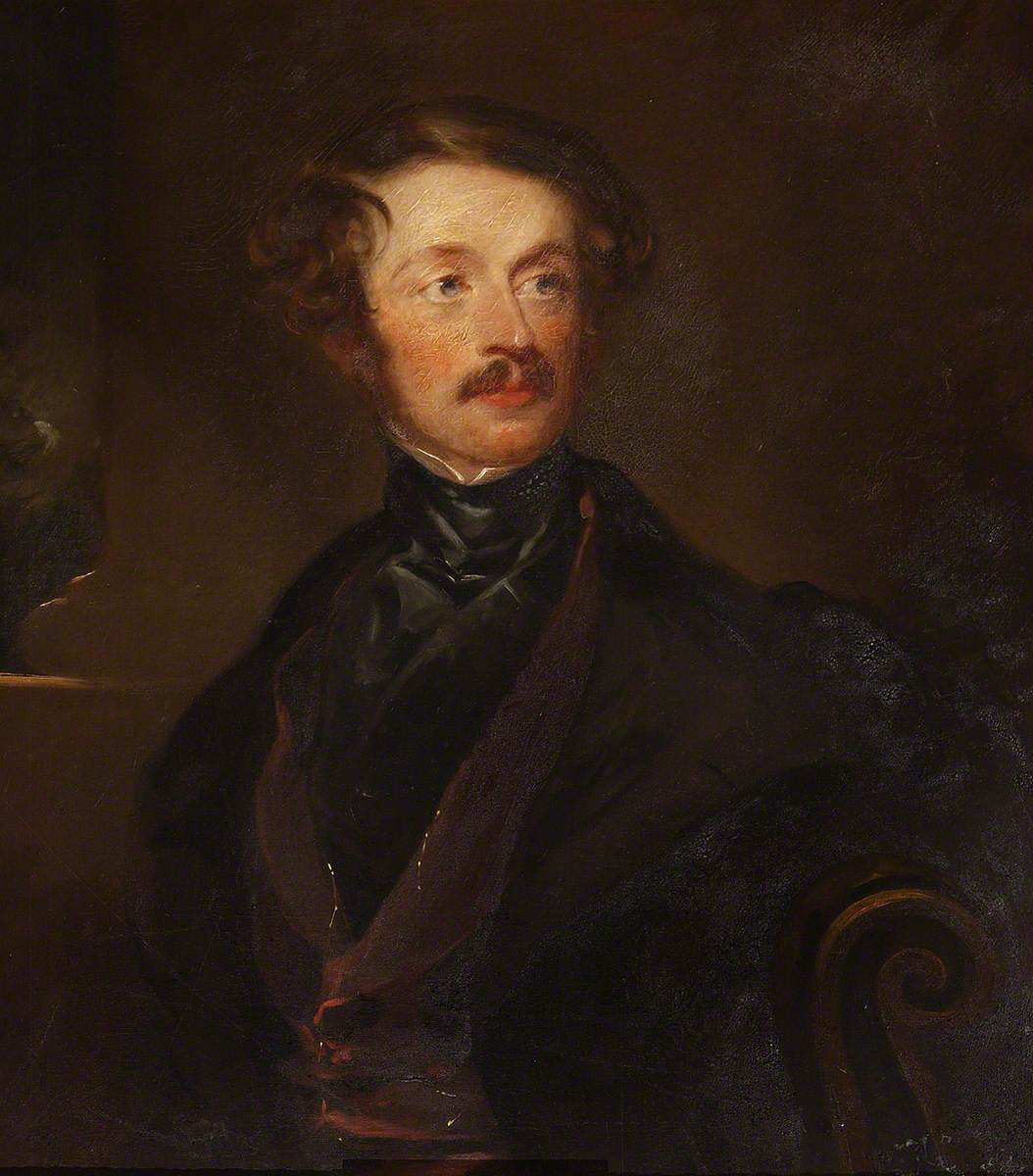
- Portrait by John Hayter, 1850

Master of the Horse
- In office 24 June 1859 – 26 June 1866
- Monarch: Victoria
- Prime Minister: The Viscount Palmerston; The Earl Russell
- Preceded by: The Duke of Beaufort
- Succeeded by: The Duke of Beaufort
- In office 12 December 1868 – 17 February 1874
- Monarch: Victoria
- Prime Minister: William Ewart Gladstone
- Preceded by: The Duke of Beaufort
- Succeeded by: The Earl of Bradford

Personal details
- Born: 20 November 1804 Lower Grosvenor Street, London
- Died: 6 January 1878 (aged 73) Lockeridge House, Wiltshire
- Party: Liberal
- Spouse: Lady Mary Herbert (1813–1892)
- Parent(s): Charles Brudenell-Bruce, 1st Marquess of Ailesbury; The Hon. Henrietta Hill
- Education: Christ Church, Oxford

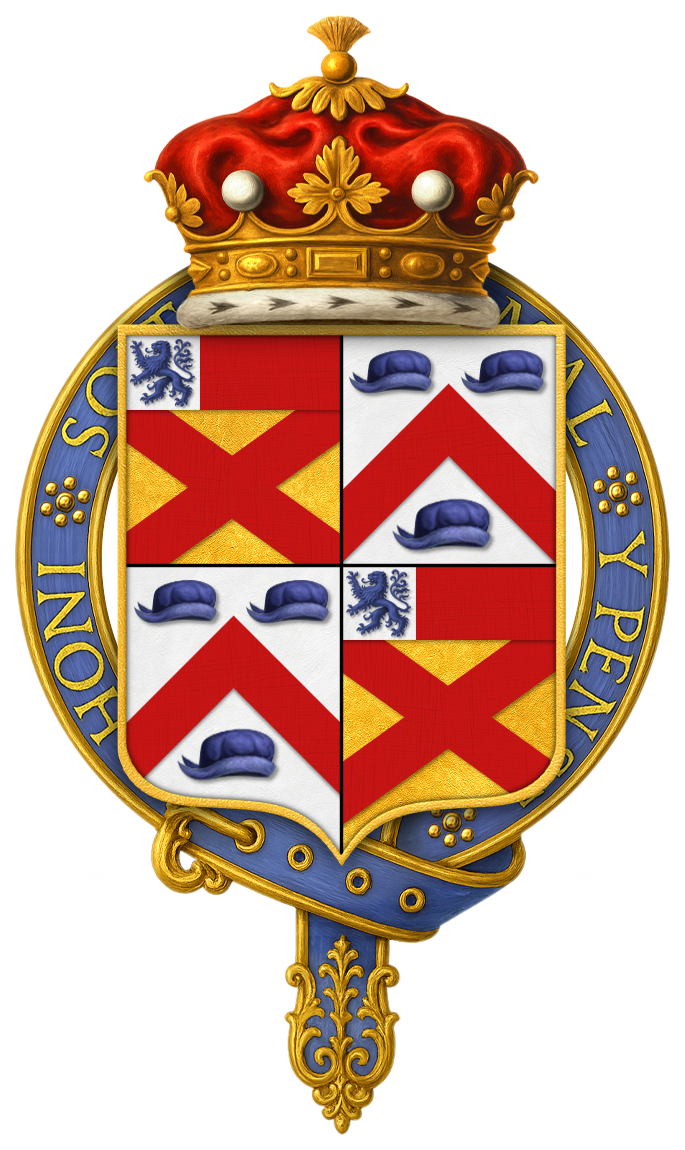
Quartered arms of George Brudenell-Bruce, 2nd Marquess of Ailesbury, KG, PC, DL

George William Frederick Brudenell-Bruce, 2nd Marquess of Ailesbury (20 November 1804 – 6 January 1878), styled Lord Bruce between 1814 and 1821 and Earl Bruce between 1821 and 1856, was a British peer, Liberal politician and courtier.

== Background and education ==
Born in Lower Grosvenor Street, London, Bruce was the oldest son of Charles Brudenell-Bruce, 1st Marquess of Ailesbury, and his first wife the Hon. Henrietta Hill, oldest daughter of Noel Hill, 1st Baron Berwick. He was the brother of Ernest Brudenell-Bruce, 3rd Marquess of Ailesbury, and the half-brother of Lord Charles Brudenell-Bruce. He was baptised at St George's, Hanover Square, with King George III and Queen Charlotte as his godparents. He was educated at Eton College and Christ Church, Oxford. In 1856, he succeeded to his father's titles and, in 1868, to those of his distant cousin James Brudenell, 7th Earl of Cardigan.

== Career ==
Bruce entered the British House of Commons in 1826, representing Marlborough as Member of Parliament (MP) until 1829. In 1838, he was summoned to the House of Lords through a writ of acceleration in his father's subsidiary title Baron Bruce. He was appointed Yeomanry Aide to Queen Victoria in 1857 and was invested as a Privy Counsellor in 1859. Ailesbury held political office under Lord Palmerston and Lord Russell as Master of the Horse between 1859 and 1866. Having previously been a Deputy Lieutenant, he became Lord Lieutenant of Wiltshire in 1863. On 25 May 1864, he was invested as a Knight of the Garter. He was once again Master of the Horse, this time under William Ewart Gladstone, between 1868 and 1874.

== Family and death ==
On 11 May 1837, Lord Ailesbury married Lady Mary Herbert, third daughter of George Herbert, 11th Earl of Pembroke, in the church where he was baptised. Brudenell-Bruce died in 1878, aged 73, at Lockeridge House, near Marlborough, Wiltshire, and was buried there.

Because he had no issue, his titles were inherited by his younger brother, Ernest Brudenell-Bruce. The Marchioness of Ailesbury died at 78 Pall Mall, London, in January 1892, aged 78. She is buried in St Katharine's Church, Great Bedwyn.

Parliament of the United Kingdom
Preceded by Hon. John Wodehouse; Lord Brudenell	Member of Parliament for Marlborough; 1826–1829; With: Lord Brudenell	Succeeded by Thomas Sotheron-Estcourt; Lord Brudenell
Political offices
Preceded by The Duke of Beaufort	Master of the Horse; 1859–1866	Succeeded by The Duke of Beaufort
Preceded by The Duke of Beaufort	Master of the Horse; 1868–1874	Succeeded by The Earl of Bradford
Honorary titles
Preceded by The Marquess of Lansdowne	Lord Lieutenant of Wiltshire; 1863–1878	Succeeded by The Earl of Radnor
Peerage of the United Kingdom
Preceded by Charles Brudenell-Bruce	Marquess of Ailesbury; 1856–1878	Succeeded by Ernest Augustus Charles Brudenell-Bruce
Peerage of England
Preceded by James Brudenell	Earl of Cardigan; 1868–1878	Succeeded by Ernest Augustus Charles Brudenell-Bruce
Peerage of Great Britain
Preceded by Charles Brudenell-Bruce	Baron Bruce (writ in acceleration); 1838–1878	Succeeded by Ernest Augustus Charles Brudenell-Bruce
