= Edward Fitzalan-Howard, 1st Baron Howard of Glossop =

British politician (1818–1883)

The Right Honourable The Lord Howard of Glossop PC
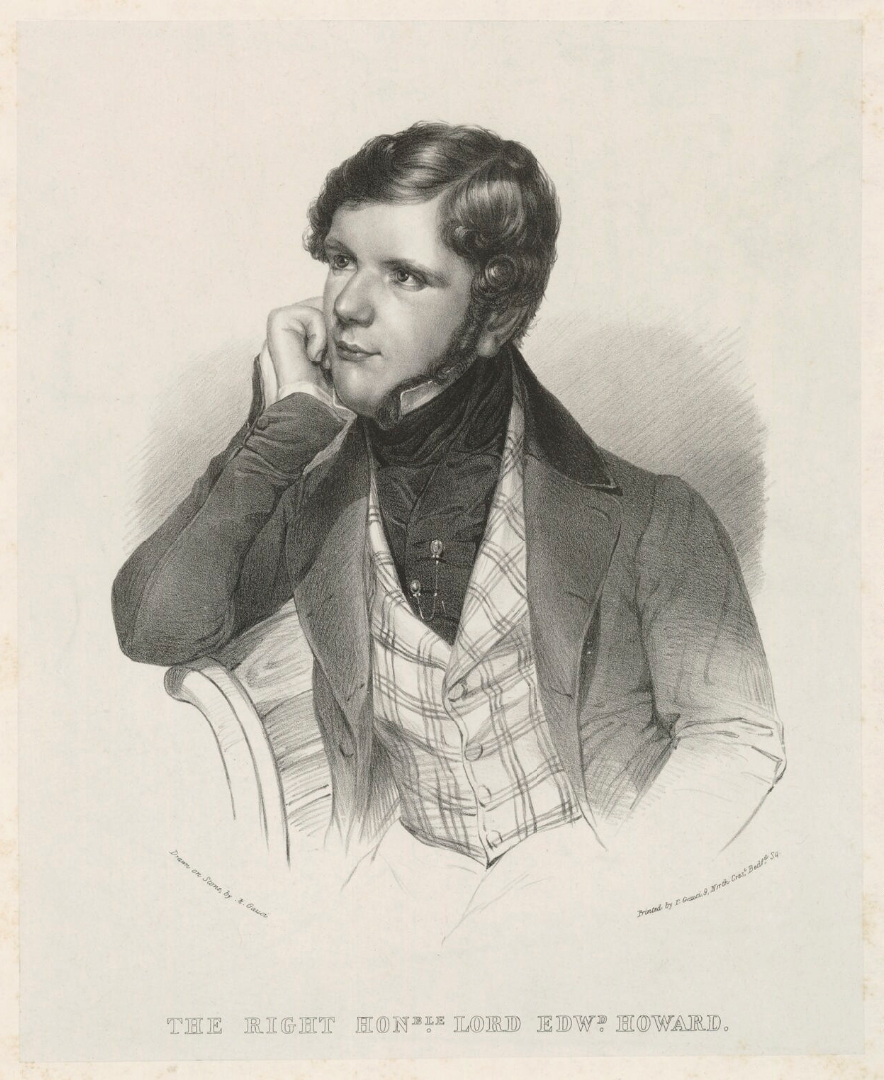
- Lithograph by Maxim Gauci.

Vice-Chamberlain of the Household
- In office 8 July 1846 – 21 February 1852
- Monarch: Victoria
- Prime Minister: Lord John Russell
- Preceded by: Lord Ernest Bruce
- Succeeded by: Viscount Newport

Personal details
- Born: 20 June 1818 Norfolk House, Westminster
- Died: 1 December 1883 (aged 65) Knightsbridge, London
- Party: Liberal
- Spouse(s): Augusta Talbot (m. 1851; died 1862) Winifreda Phillipps (m. 1863)
- Children: 7; including Francis Edward Fitzalan-Howard, 2nd Baron Howard of Glossop
- Parent(s): Henry Howard, 13th Duke of Norfolk; Lady Charlotte Sophia Leveson-Gower
- Education: Trinity College, Cambridge

Edward George Fitzalan-Howard, 1st Baron Howard of Glossop PC (né Howard; 20 June 1818 – 1 December 1883), styled Lord Edward Howard between 1842 and 1869, was a British Liberal politician. He served as Vice-Chamberlain of the Household under Lord John Russell from 1846 to 1852.

== Background and education ==
Howard was the second son of Henry Howard, 13th Duke of Norfolk and Lady Charlotte Leveson-Gower, daughter of George Leveson-Gower, 1st Duke of Sutherland. Henry Fitzalan-Howard, 14th Duke of Norfolk, was his elder brother. He was educated at Trinity College, Cambridge.

== Political career ==
In 1846 Howard was sworn of the Privy Council and appointed Vice-Chamberlain of the Household in Lord John Russell's first administration, despite not having a seat in Parliament. Two years later he was returned to parliament for Horsham. He remained as Vice-Chamberlain of the Household until the fall of the Russell administration in 1852. The same year he was returned to parliament for Arundel, a seat he held until 1868. In 1869 he was raised to the peerage as Baron Howard of Glossop, in the County of Derby.

Lord Howard of Glossop was also Deputy Earl Marshal from 1860 to 1868 during the minority of his nephew Henry Fitzalan-Howard, 15th Duke of Norfolk.

Howard rendered great service to the cause of Roman Catholic primary education. From 1869 to 1877 he was chairman of the Catholic Poor Schools Committee. As chairman he set up the Catholic Education Crisis Fund, subscribing £5,000 to it himself, but securing another £20,000 from his family. Seventy thousand scholars were thus added to the Roman Catholic schools in England at a cost of at least £350,000.

He had substantial landholdings, with 18,000 acres in northern England and Scotland.

== Family ==
His surname at birth was Howard; by royal licence dated 26 April 1842, his father (then Duke) added "Fitzalan" before his children's surnames, so they all became Fitzalan-Howard, which surname their male-line descendants have borne ever since. Their ancestor, Thomas Howard, 4th Duke of Norfolk, married Mary FitzAlan (daughter and heiress of Henry Fitzalan, 12th Earl of Arundel) in 1555.

Lord Howard of Glossop married Augusta Talbot, daughter of George Henry Talbot (half-brother of John Talbot, 16th Earl of Shrewsbury), in 1851. They had two sons and five daughters:

- Hon. Angela Mary Charlotte Fitzalan-Howard (died 1 March 1919), married Marmaduke Constable-Maxwell, 11th Lord Herries of Terregles, and was the mother of Gwendolen Fitzalan-Howard, Duchess of Norfolk.
- Hon. Alice Elizabeth Fitzalan-Howard (died 10 May 1915), married Charles Rawdon-Hastings, 11th Earl of Loudoun.
- Hon. Constance Mary Germana Fitzalan-Howard (died 30 January 1933), married Colonel Charles Lennox Tredcroft.
- Hon. Winifrede Mary Fitzalan-Howard (died 26 January 1937), married William W. Middleton.
- Charles Bernard Talbot Fitzalan-Howard (3 June 1852 – 8 July 1861).
- Hon. Gwendolen Mary Anne Fitzalan-Howard (21 February 1854 – 15 January 1932), married John Crichton-Stuart, 3rd Marquess of Bute.
- Francis Edward Fitzalan-Howard, 2nd Baron Howard of Glossop (9 May 1859 – 22 September 1924), father of Bernard Fitzalan-Howard, 3rd Baron Howard of Glossop.

Augusta died in July 1862. Lord Howard of Glossop married as his second wife Winifred Mary de Lisle, daughter of Ambrose Lisle March Phillipps de Lisle, in 1863. They had no children. He died in December 1883, aged 65, and was succeeded by his only surviving son, Francis who married Mary Littledale Greenwood, daughter of politician John Greenwood. Lady Howard of Glossop died in December 1909.

In 1975 following the death without male issue of Bernard Fitzalan-Howard, 16th Duke of Norfolk, the Dukedom was inherited by Lord Glossop's great-grandson, Miles Francis. Miles's son, Edward is the current Duke.

Parliament of the United Kingdom
Preceded by William Vesey-FitzGerald	Member of Parliament for Horsham; 1848–1852	Succeeded by William Vesey-FitzGerald
Preceded by Edward Strutt	Member of Parliament for Arundel; 1852–1868	Constituency abolished
Political offices
Preceded by Lord Ernest Bruce	Vice-Chamberlain of the Household; 1846–1852	Succeeded by Viscount Newport
Peerage of the United Kingdom
New creation	Baron Howard of Glossop; 1869–1883	Succeeded by Francis Fitzalan-Howard
