= Tottenham House =

Country house in Wiltshire, England

Coordinates: 51.374°N 1.643°W

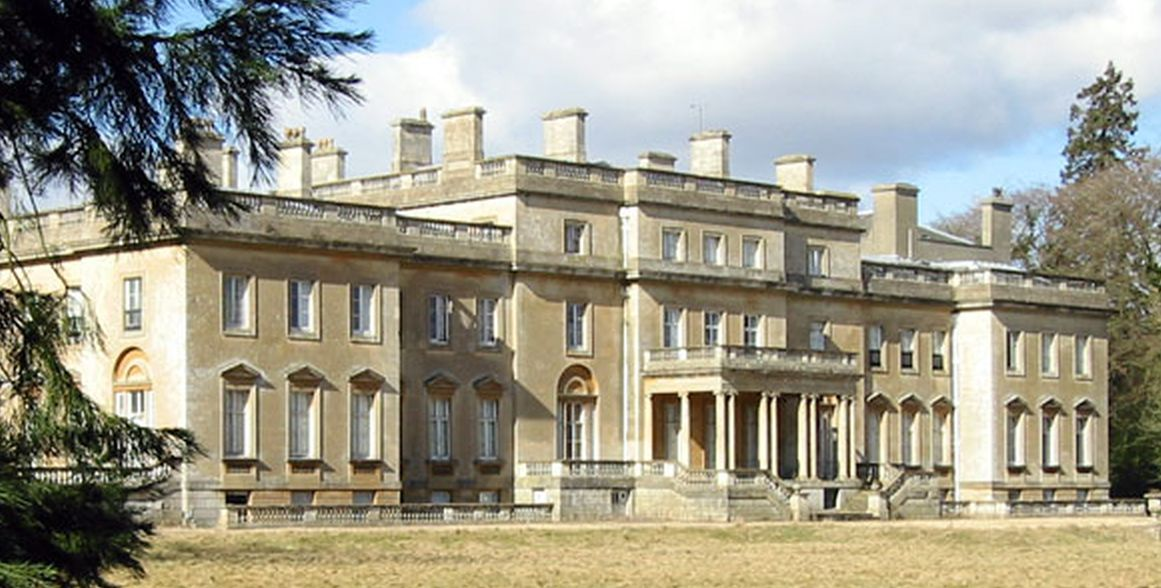
Tottenham House, Wiltshire, east front, in 2006

Tottenham House is a large Grade I listed English country house in the parish of Great Bedwyn, Wiltshire, about five miles southeast of the town of Marlborough. It is separated from the town by Savernake Forest, which is part of the Tottenham Park estate.

The site of the house was part of the much larger Savernake Forest, and in the Middle Ages was controlled by the heads of the Esturmy family. In the 15th century, the land passed by marriage to the House of Seymour of nearby Wulfhall, about one mile to the south. The original house was probably built in about 1575 by Edward Seymour, 1st Earl of Hertford, a nephew of Queen Jane Seymour, when it was known as Totnam Lodge. The present house incorporates parts of the earlier houses on the site built by the Seymours. In 1675, the estate passed to Lady Elizabeth Seymour, who married Thomas Bruce, 2nd Earl of Ailesbury, thus bringing the house into the Bruce family.

In 1721, Elizabeth Seymour's son and heir, Charles Bruce, 3rd Earl of Ailesbury, rebuilt Totnam Lodge to the design of his brother-in-law, the pioneering Palladian architect Lord Burlington, and parts of the grounds, including the kitchen garden, were laid out by Capability Brown between 1764 and about 1770, commissioned by Thomas Brudenell-Bruce, 1st Earl of Ailesbury. The house underwent a number of further rebuilds, and the current house, containing more than one hundred rooms, mostly dates from the 1820s, having then been remodelled by Charles Brudenell-Bruce, 1st Marquess of Ailesbury, who in 1818 (while still Earl of Aylesbury) had added a new range of stables designed by Thomas Cundy.

The Bruce family lived in the house until 1946. Thereafter it was used as a preparatory school until 1994, and then leased to a charity until 2005, after which it was unoccupied for some ten years, apart from a period in 2006, when the band Radiohead recorded part of their album In Rainbows at the house. It was then leased for 150 years to a US-based consortium with the intention of creating a luxury hotel and golfing centre, but the consortium went bankrupt in 2008. In 2014, the house was sold for £11.25m to an undisclosed buyer who had plans to turn it back into a private home, after which it was sold to billionaire Chris Rokos, who had similar plans. Planning applications made at the end of 2024 indicated significant renovations were planned.

== Early history ==
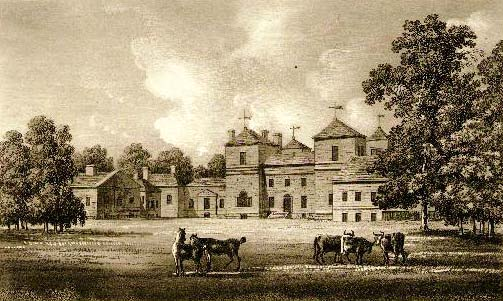
Tottenham House, depicted circa 1790, the Palladian building designed by Lord Burlington circa 1721, largely lost following remodelling in the 1820s

The site of Tottenham House was known by 1200 as Tottenham Wood, a part of the much larger Savernake Forest, and was under the control of the Esturmy family. The land passed to the Seymour family by the marriage of Maud Esturmy to Roger II Seymour in the 15th century. It was probably Edward Seymour, 1st Earl of Hertford (1539–1621), son and heir of the 1st Duke, of nearby Wulfhall, who in about 1575 built the first house, known as Totnam Lodge, and enclosed its surrounding land to form a deer park. Wulfhall was partly demolished, and the building materials used to construct Tottenham House.

King James and his consort Anne of Denmark visited the house in 1603. The Earl of Hertford asked the poet Samuel Daniel and his brother the lutenist John Daniel to write and organise an entertainment for the visit. The house was still known as the Lodge in 1623, in which year the parish register of Great Bedwyn records the baptism of the 1st Earl's great-granddaughter Frances Seymour, the daughter of Sir Francis Seymour (c. 1590 – 1664) (later created Baron Seymour of Trowbridge), which was performed "at the Lodge in the Great Parke by Henrie Taylor, Vicar of Great Bedwin".

John Seymour, 4th Duke of Somerset (1629–1675), an uncle, inherited the estate in 1671 on the death of his nephew the 3rd Duke, and in 1672 he rebuilt Totnam Lodge and redesigned the deer park, which at that date included long tree-lined walks and a deer chase. The 4th Duke of Somerset bequeathed the unentailed Seymour estates to his niece Elizabeth Seymour, the wife of Thomas Bruce, 2nd Earl of Ailesbury (1656–1741), thus passing some of the Seymour estates to the Bruce family. In 1721 Elizabeth Seymour's son and heir, Charles Bruce, 3rd Earl of Ailesbury, rebuilt Totnam Lodge to the design of his brother-in-law, the pioneering Palladian architect Lord Burlington. Henry Flitcroft was the executant architect. The 3rd Earl added wings to Burlington's block in the 1730s, and also built in 1743 a Banqueting House in the park to the design of Burlington (demolished in 1824). Thomas Brudenell-Bruce, 1st Earl of Ailesbury inherited the estate in 1747 from his uncle, Charles Bruce, 3rd Earl of Ailesbury in 1747. Parts of the grounds, including the kitchen garden, were laid out by Capability Brown from 1764 to c 1770, commissioned by Thomas Brudenell-Bruce.

In 1818, Charles Brudenell-Bruce, 2nd Earl of Ailesbury, added stables to the design of Thomas Cundy II. In 1823–26 he enlarged and remodelled the house, again to the designs of Thomas Cundy.

== Modern use ==
The Ailesbury family lived in the house, sharing it during the Second World War with the US Army, until 1946. Thereafter it was used by Hawtreys Preparatory School until 1994 when Hawtreys merged with Cheam School, Newbury. It was then leased for ten years to the Amber Foundation, a charity which helped unemployed troubled young people to rebuild their lives, but its work there ended due to cuts in government support.

In 1966, the house was designated as Grade I listed, while the small octagonal folly building (c. 1720) in the deer park, and the stable block (1819) were designated Grade II*.

David Brudenell-Bruce, Earl of Cardigan owned 49% and his son Thomas James Brudenell-Bruce, Viscount Savernake owned 51%. Between 2011 and 2017, the impoverished Earl was involved in a bitter legal battle with the trustees.

In 2006 the house, with its 50-horse stable block, outbuildings and some farmland, was leased for 150 years to a consortium of Golf Club Investment Holdings, Conduit Investments, and (as operator) the Buena Vista Hospitality Group of Orlando, Florida, with the intention of creating a luxury hotel, conference, spa, and golfing centre. Full planning permission was obtained, with the co-operation of the local Planning Authority and English Heritage, and an investment in the project of £50 million was announced. However 18 months later, before starting any building work, the consortium failed during the recession, and the lease ended.

In 2014, the trustees sold the house and 800 acres for £11.25m to an undisclosed buyer, which was believed to be multi-millionaire property developer Jamie Ritblat after overcoming a legal challenge from the Earl of Cardigan. In November 2014 the Earl was reported in the Daily Telegraph newspaper to be living with his second wife and baby daughter in an unheated lodge in the grounds of Tottenham House on a £71-a-week jobseeker's allowance while training to be a lorry driver. He is still theoretically the hereditary Warden of Savernake Forest and has stated he was: "put on this earth to take care of Savernake and I will never let it go". He was due to benefit from the sale proceeds and would still own jointly with the trustees 3,700 acres, mainly woodland, in Savernake Forest. In 2017 he was able to remove both trustees from office, and restore his family’s income.

As of 2017, the house had been unoccupied since 2005. Plans were submitted in December 2017 to return the house, stables, outbuildings, and park to a family residence.

== In popular culture ==
- The house featured as the boys' school Dryden Park in the 1995 film A Feast at Midnight, starring Christopher Lee.
- In 2006, the band Radiohead recorded part of their 2007 album In Rainbows at the house.
- In 2013, the house and Savernake estate were used as the location for a short film commissioned by electronica pioneers Goldfrapp to promote the song 'Drew' from their album Tales of Us. Shot in black and white by film editor Lisa Gunning, the internal and external aspects of the house and surrounding forest feature extensively in the five-minute film.
