= Henry Hoare =

British banker, politician, and garden designer (1705–1785)

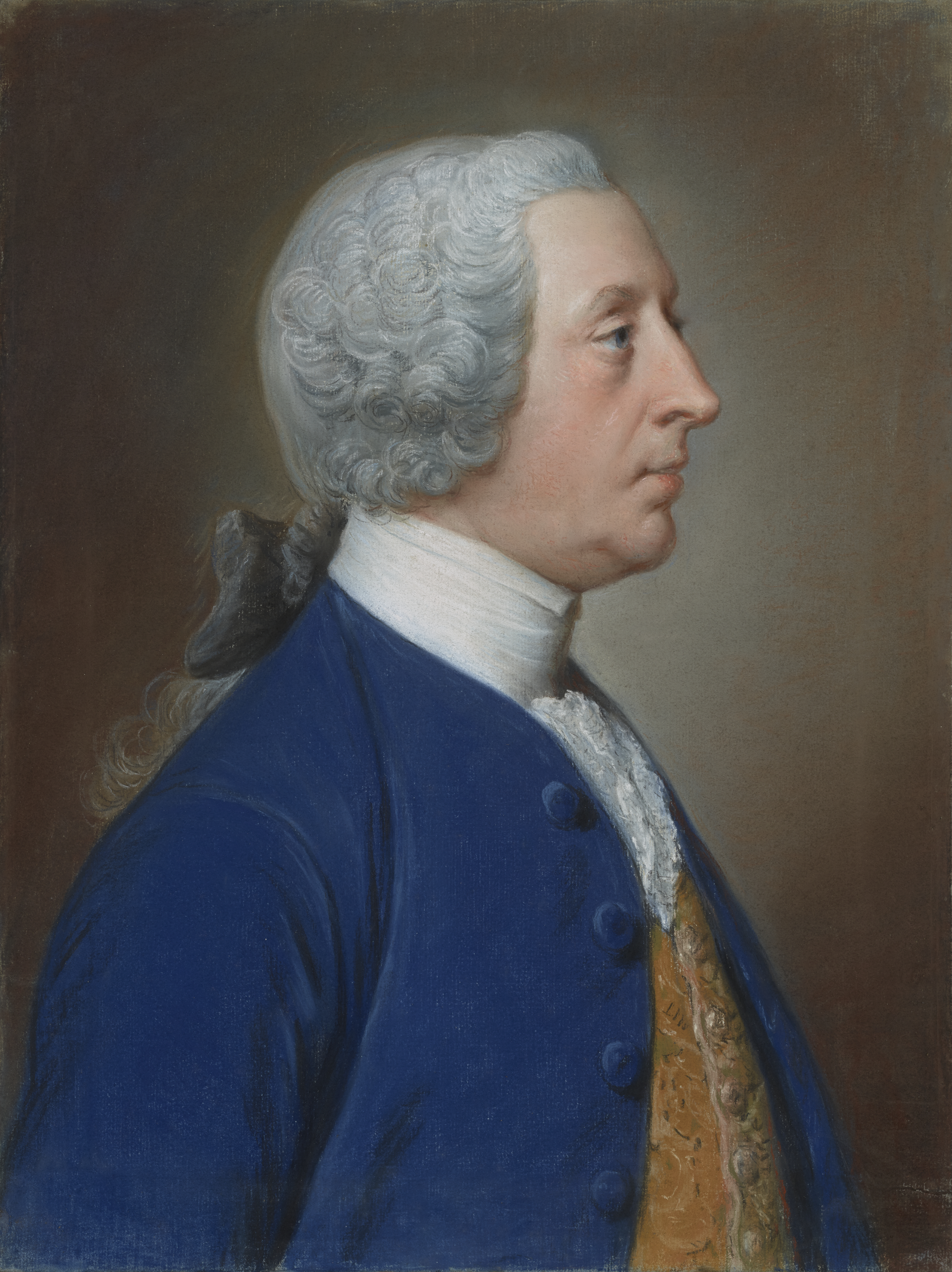
Henry Hoare portrayed by his friend the painter William Hoare about 1750–1760

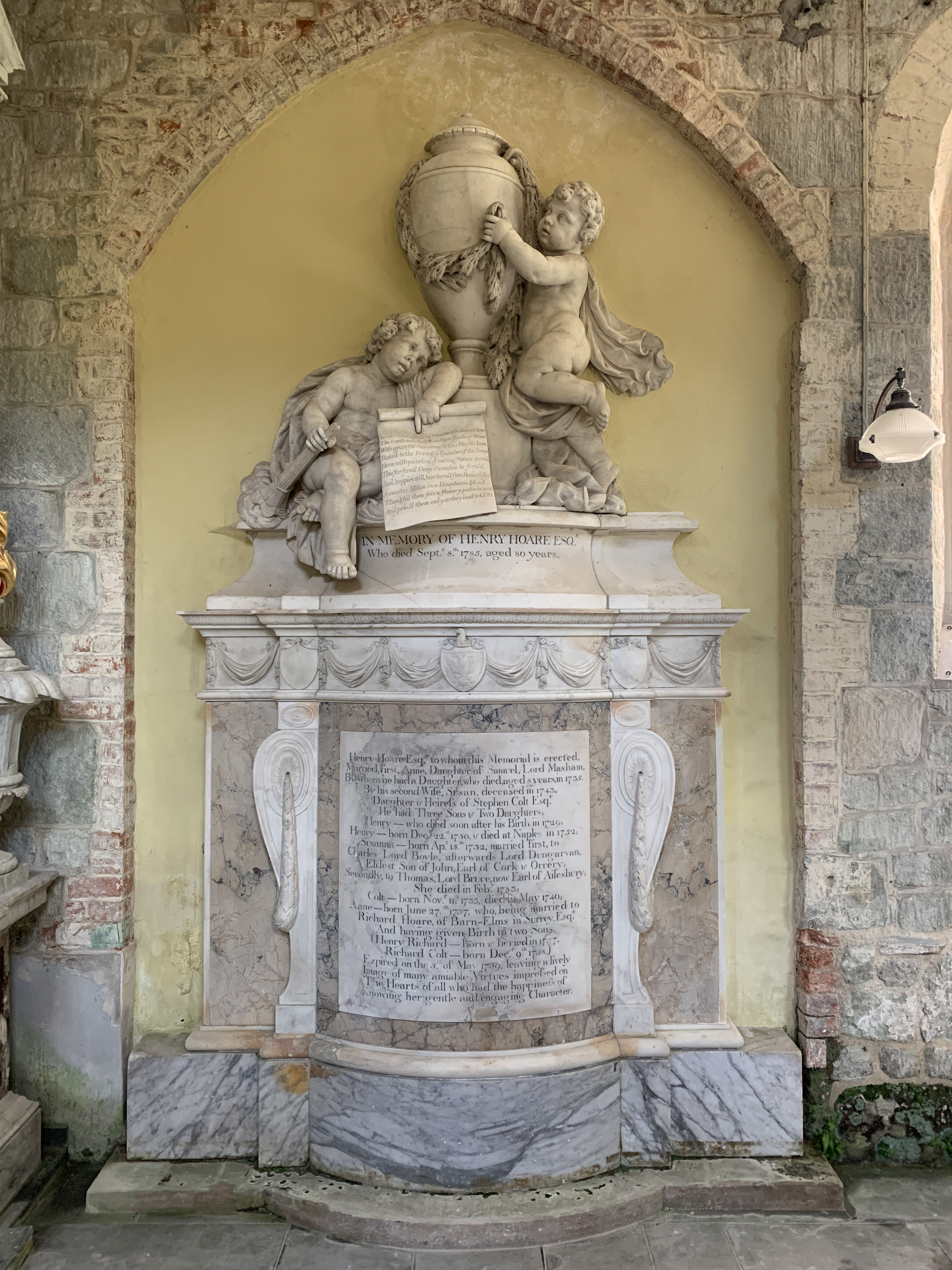
Memorial in St Peter's Church, Stourton

Henry Hoare II (1705–1785), known as Henry the Magnificent, was an English banker and garden owner-designer.

== Family ==
Henry's grandfather, Richard Hoare, was a goldsmith-banker and Lord Mayor of London. His father, Henry Hoare I, bought the ancestral estate of the Stourtons and built a Palladian villa designed by Colen Campbell. When his father died, Henry Hoare II was 20 years old. He was educated at Westminster School.

== Career ==
Henry dominated the Hoare family through his wealth and personal charisma. He was a partner for nearly 60 years in Hoare's Bank. His nickname, "Henry The Magnificent", derived in part from his influence as a great patron of the arts, but more particularly because he laid out the gardens at Stourhead in Wiltshire, an estate bought by his father. In the thirty years after his mother died in 1741, he worked on the gardens at Stourhead, planning and planting what became a "masterpiece" of European garden design. In the 'school' of Poussin, it was said to be "more beautiful than any landscape put on canvas". The gardens were admired as a showplace and Capability Brown, the renowned landscape gardener, was well known to Henry. In 1734 he was elected Member of Parliament for Salisbury.

He died in 1785 leaving Stourhead to the son of his daughter Ann (1734–1759), Richard Colt Hoare. His younger daughter, Susanna, became Countess of Ailesbury.

Parliament of Great Britain
Preceded by Anthony Duncombe; Thomas Lewis	Member of Parliament for Salisbury; 1734–1741; With: Peter Bathurst	Succeeded by Sir Jacob Bouverie; Sir Edward Seymour
