= William Bayly (barrister) =

Member of the Parliament of England

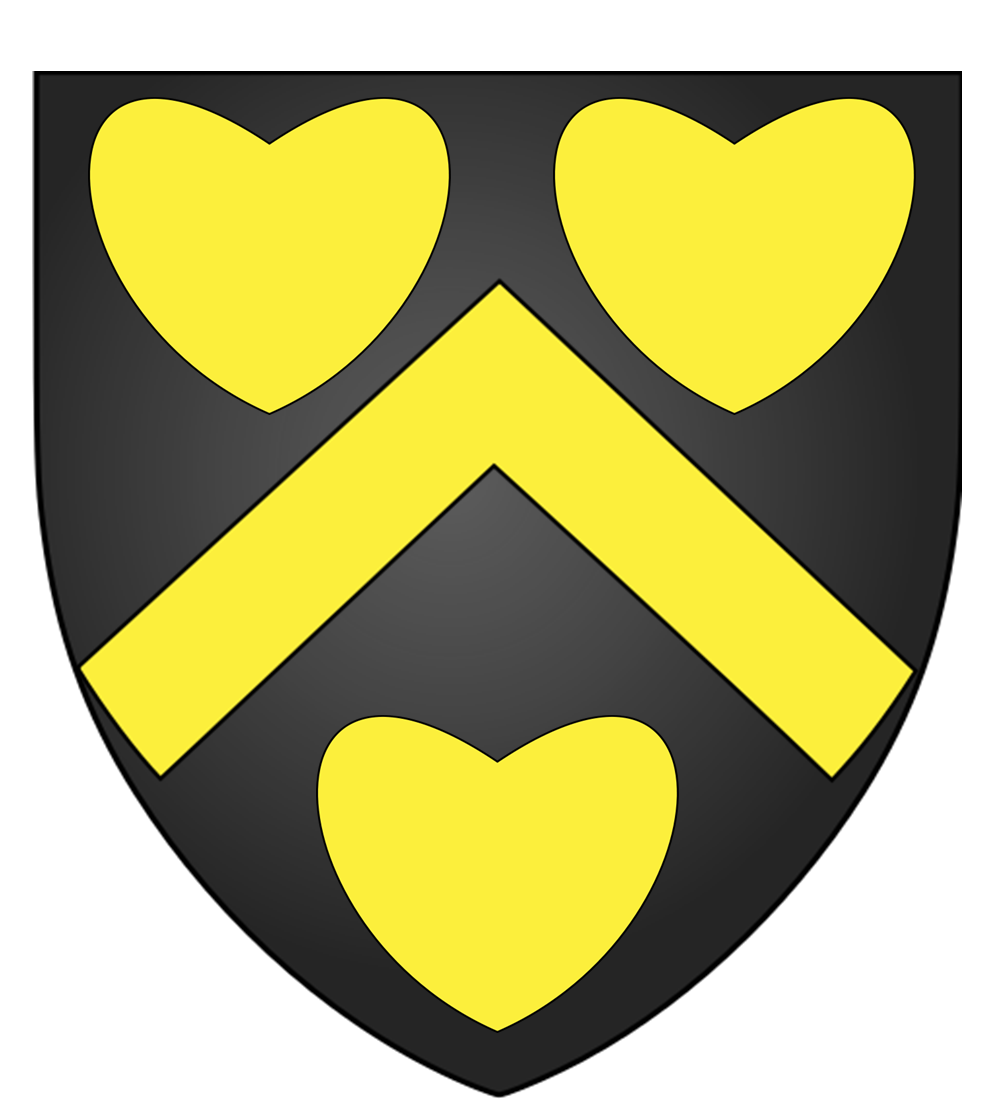
Arms of the Bayly family of Chippenham, Wiltshire (Note: Escutcheon: "Sable a chevron between three hearts or". Sir William Segar confirmed and patented the arms in 1623; he also granted William's son, John Bayly, a personal crest.)

William Bayly, Bayley or Bayliffe JP (c. 1540 – 1612) was an English barrister and administrator who briefly served as a Member for the borough of Chippenham in the English Parliament of 1572.

== Early life and family ==
Bayly was born at Chippenham around 1540. He was the son of John Bayly, a lawyer at Lyon's Inn and Joan or Jone, both of Castle Cary, Somerset. The Bayly family were of reasonable nobility; they were armigerous and allied, mostly in providing legal and agency assistance, to the influential Seymour family. On 27 November 1559, aged 19, William was admitted to the Middle Temple for training as a barrister. Completing his tuition, he was called to the Bar and subsequently granted the lease to Chippenham's Monkton House and half its estate (400 acres) in 1567 by Gabriel Pleydell, an infamous politician who had once conspired to exile Queen Mary I. Bayly became Pleydell's son-in-law through his marriage to Gabriel's only daughter, Agnes, in St Andrew's Church, Chippenham. The section of the church in which they married was formerly named "Bayliffe's Aisle" in their honour.

Parliament of England
Preceded by John Scott; Robert Viser	Member for Chippenham; 1572–1583; With: John Scott	Succeeded by Robert Baynard; Robert Hyde
