= William Neville =

William Neville may refer to:

- William Neville (American politician) (1843–1909), American politician
- William Neville, Earl of Kent (c. 1405–1463)
- William Neville (poet) (1497–c.1545)
- William Neville (by 1532–1559 or later), MP for Chippenham
- William Neville (Lollard knight) (c. 1341–1391), MP for Nottinghamshire
- William Neville (rugby union) (1855–1904), Irish international rugby union player
- Billy Neville (footballer) (1935–2018), Irish footballer
- Bill Neville, see Canadian federal election results in Eastern Ontario

== See also ==
- William Nevill (disambiguation), for other members of this family
