= Chippenham by-election =

Chippenham by-election may refer to one of two parliamentary by-elections held for the British House of Commons constituency of Chippenham, in Wiltshire:

- 1943 Chippenham by-election
- 1962 Chippenham by-election

== See also ==
- Chippenham constituency
- List of United Kingdom by-elections
