= Boldero =

Boldero may refer to

- Edmund Boldero (1608–79), English Royalist clergyman
- Henry George Boldero (1794–1873), British army officer and Member of Parliament
- Henry Kearney Boldero (1831–1900), English cleric and cricketer
- Luigi Gorgio Boldero (Baldero) (19th century), Italian painter
- Ancient English spelling of Bolderāja, Latvia
