= William Sharington =

Member of the Parliament of England

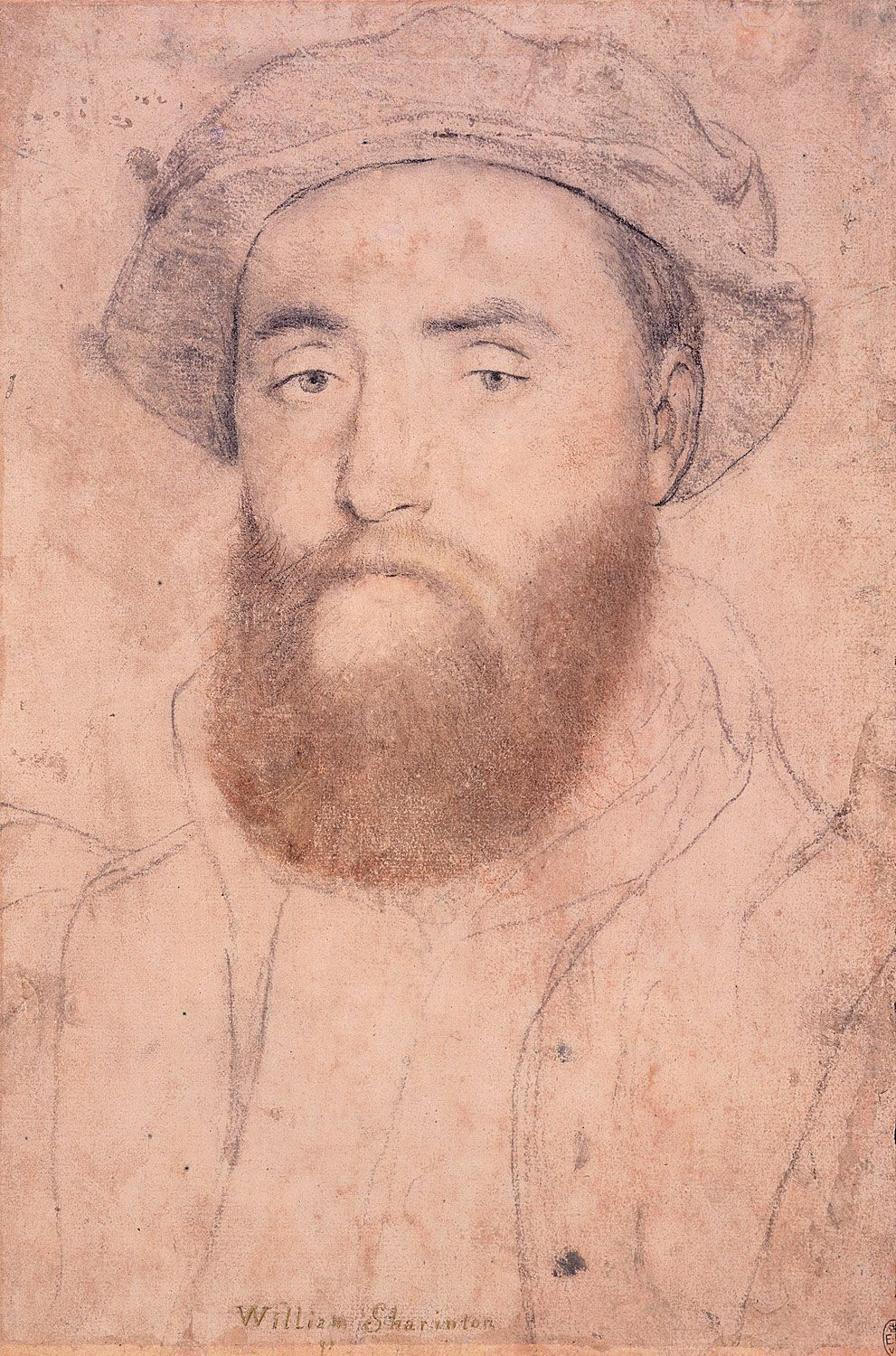
Sharington by Holbein

Sir William Sharington (born in around 1495, died before 6 July 1553) was an English landowner and merchant, a courtier of the time of Henry VIII, master and embezzler of the Bristol Mint, member of parliament, conspirator, and High Sheriff of Wiltshire.

== Early life ==
Sharington was the eldest son of Thomas Sharington, a gentleman of Cranworth in Norfolk, by his wife Katherine, daughter and heiress of William Pyrton of Little Bentley, Essex. In early life, Sharington is known to have made a visit to Italy, during which he developed an interest in art. Sharington's father left him the manor of Swathing's at Fransham in the Launditch hundred of Norfolk by a will dated 15 October 1519, and Sharington sold it in 1532. The manor had come to Sharington's great-grandfather Henry Sharington, who was steward to the Bishop of Ely, when he married Elizabeth, daughter and heiress of Edmund de Swathing.

== Career ==
Sharington's early career is obscure. He married Ursula, an illegitimate daughter of John Bourchier, Lord Berners, who had served as Chancellor of the Exchequer, and was a friend of Sharington. By 1538, he was in the service of Sir Francis Bryan, who was a soldier and diplomat, thus becoming a friend of Thomas Seymour, who was also in Bryan's service. Seymour was one of the brothers of Jane Seymour, who in 1536 became King Henry VIII's third queen consort. By 1539, Sharington had been appointed a page of the king's robes, and in 1540 was promoted to Groom of the Robes. The king trusted him, and in 1541 he was made a page of the Privy chamber and in 1542 a Groom of the Chamber. Also in 1542, he was appointed steward and constable of Castle Rising, in his home county of Norfolk. In 1544, he joined the household of Queen Catherine Parr.

In 1540, following the dissolution of the monasteries, Sharington paid £783 for Lacock Abbey in Wiltshire, soon beginning to convert it into a private residence, in which he demonstrated good taste. He retained much of the medieval fabric of the house, adding a three-storey octagonal tower, tall Renaissance chimneys, and a stable courtyard, while demolishing a church. Hutton, in his Highways and Byways in Wiltshire, comments:

All the sixteenth century work of Sir William Sharington is of great beauty ... What Sharington spared he jealously guarded.

At about the same time, for his friend John Dudley, later Duke of Northumberland, Sharington designed a range of new buildings at Dudley Castle which were erected within the old castle's walls and which have been called the Sharrington Range.

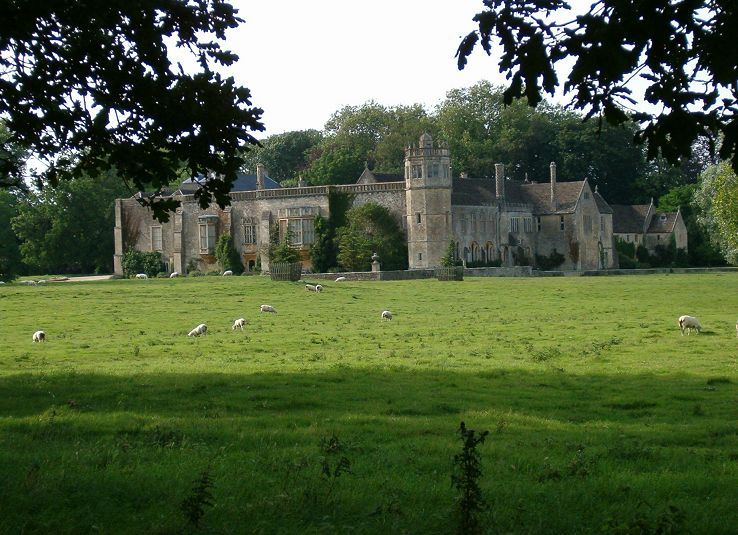
Lacock Abbey, Wiltshire, rebuilt by Sharington

In June 1541 Sharington leased the manor of Heytesbury, Wiltshire, from the Crown, making him the most powerful man in those parts for the next seven years. He began to buy land on a large scale. In 1543 he spent more than £1,000, and in 1548 over £2,800, by which time he owned fourteen manors in Wiltshire and others in the neighbouring counties of Somerset, Dorset, and Gloucestershire. He sat as member of parliament for Heytesbury in 1545, and for Bramber (a rotten borough in Sussex) in 1547. He was knighted at the coronation of King Edward VI on 20 February 1547. In 1547, he became one of the two knights of the Shire for Wiltshire.

Apart from his interests in land, Sharington was a merchant and owned several ships trading out of Bristol. He is known to have bought wool from all parts of Wiltshire and was also active as a moneylender.

In 1546, in a development which ultimately led to his downfall, Sharington became under-treasurer of a newly re-established mint at Bristol Castle. Despite its title, this position was in effect that of master of the mint, and it carried a salary of 200 marks (or £133 6s 8d) a year. With a staff of six men, including an engraver, Bristol was the only mint outside London to make gold coins, and also the only one apart from that at the Tower of London to have its own engraver. As well as English coins, it also produced the coinage of Ireland.

In 1547, Sharington was appointed to commissions to report on the king's mints and on the Admiralty, as a chantry commissioner for Gloucestershire, Gloucester, and the city of Bristol, and as a Justice of the Peace for Wiltshire.

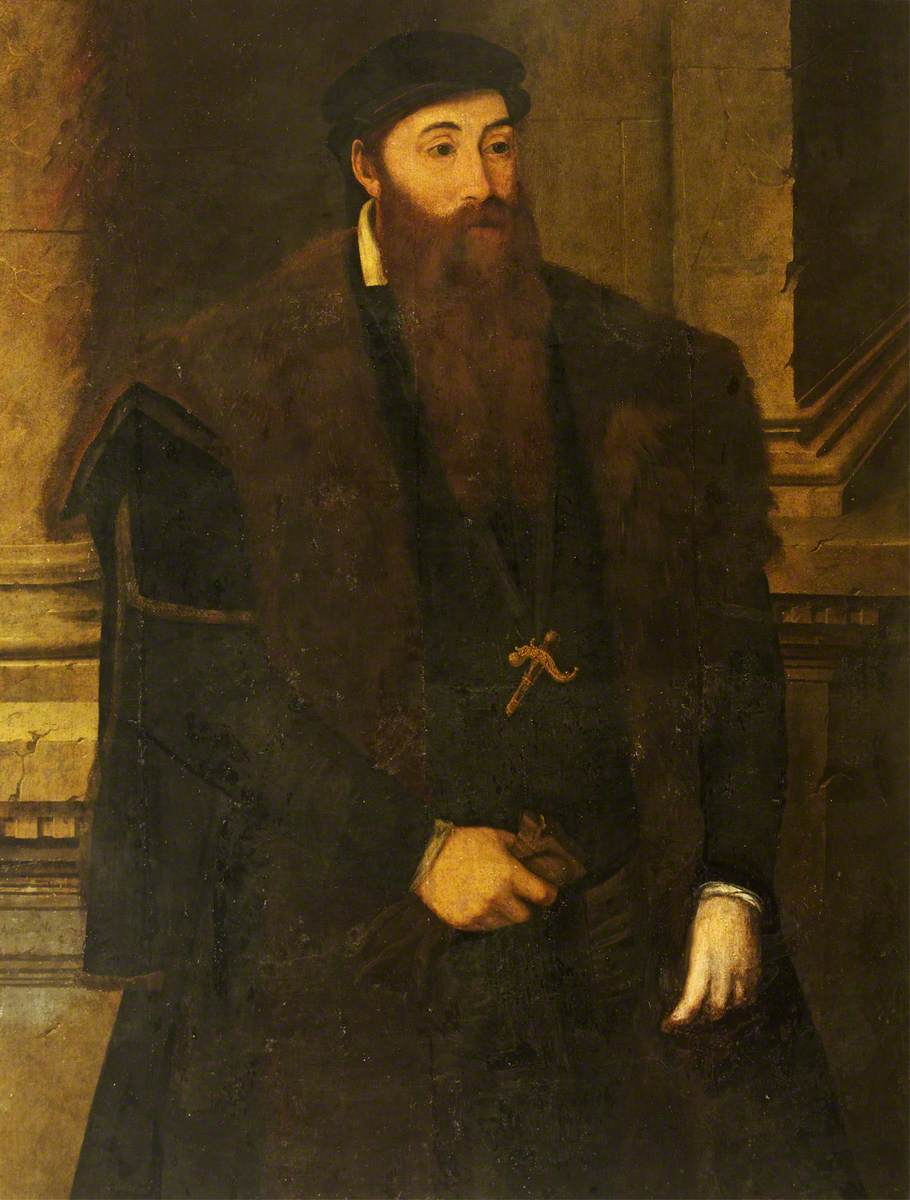
Sir William Sharington (c. 1495-1553)

By 1548, Sharington had begun to defraud the Bristol mint by making coins too light and by minting more coins than had been ordered, keeping false records to fend off discovery. According to his later confession, he had been afraid that his minting activity would leave him out of pocket. He may also have been anxious about the costs of his development at Lacock. As a result, Sharington became involved in a plot by Thomas, Lord Seymour, to launch an armed uprising, overthrow the government of Seymour's brother Edward Seymour, 1st Duke of Somerset, and capture the boy king Edward VI. Sharington had sought the protection of Seymour in the event of the discovery that he was profiting dishonestly from his office at the mint, and Seymour persuaded Sharington to supply funds for his plot. He asked Sharington whether he could make £10,000, enough money to keep ten thousand armed men in action for a month, and Sharington had said he could and that Seymour "should lack no money". However, the plot was discovered and in January 1549, both men were arrested, Sharington on charges of coining base money, clipping, and other frauds. Sharington confessed, blaming Seymour, and suffered an attainder, forfeiting his landed estates and being ejected from his seat in parliament, while Seymour was beheaded. The reason stated for Sharington's attainder was that he had coined testoons for personal gain. However, all testoons of the period struck in quantity by English mints were produced in base silver.

The Articles of high treason laid against Thomas Seymour included the following:

Yt is also objected and laied unto your charge that having knowledge that Sir William Sharington, knight, had committed treason, and otherwise wonderfully defrauded and deceiv'd the Kinges Majestie, nevertheless you both by your self, and by seeking Counsel for him, and by all means you could, did aid, assist, and beare hym, contrarie to your dewtie and Allegiance to the Kinges Majestie, and the good laws and orders of the realm. Yt is objected and laied unto your charge that where you owed to the said Sir William Sharington, knight, a great sum of Mony, yet to abet, beare and cloake the great falshood of the said Sharington you were not afraid to saye and affirm, before the Lord Protector and the Council, that the said Sharington did owe you a great sum of Mony, viz. 2800l. and to conspire with him in that falshood, and take a Bill of that feigned debt into your custody.

In saving his neck, Sharington had successfully sought the help of Francis Talbot, 5th Earl of Shrewsbury, and of Thomas Wriothesley, 1st Earl of Southampton, and had pleaded with Somerset himself. Without Thomas Seymour, they saw Sharington as no political threat to them, and he was also helped by Hugh Latimer, who referred to him in a sermon preached before the king during Lent of 1549, calling him "an honest gentleman, and one that God loveth ... a chosen man of God, and one of his elected". In November 1549 Sharington was pardoned, and on the payment of £12,867, he recovered his estates.

In April 1550, Sharington was appointed to travel to France with Sir Maurice Dennis to bring back two hundred thousand crowns, part of the payment for the sale of Boulogne to Henry II of France. He continued to serve as a magistrate, and when in October 1551 his Wiltshire neighbour Sir William Herbert was created Earl of Pembroke, Sharington was returned to the House of Commons at a by-election as one of the members of parliament for Wiltshire. He was appointed as Sheriff of Wiltshire for 1552.

== Family and death ==
After the death of his first wife, Ursula, Sharington married secondly Eleanor, daughter of William Walsingham and sister of Sir Francis Walsingham, and thirdly Grace Farrington, the widow of Robert Paget, an alderman of London; but he left no children. He died on an unknown date before 6 July 1553 and was succeeded in his estates by his brother Henry Sharington. In July 1553, Lady Jane Grey and Mary I signed bills for the appointment of a new Sheriff of Wiltshire "in the room of Sir William Sharington, Knight, deceased".

== Portrait ==
A sketch of Sharington by Hans Holbein the Younger was acquired by King Charles II in 1675 and is still in the Royal Collection at Windsor Castle. Inscribed at the foot 'William Sharinton', the drawing is in black and coloured chalks on pink-primed paper.

== Mint mark ==
Some coins of the Bristol mint during Sharington's control of it, including gold sovereigns of Henry VIII, bear as mint mark the letters "W. S." combined into a monogram, for 'William Sharington'.

Honorary titles
Preceded by Sir James Stumpe	Sheriff of Wiltshire; 1552–1553	Succeeded by Edward Baynard
