= Robert Hyde =

Robert Hyde may refer to:

- Robert Hyde (died 1642) (c. 1562–1642), MP for Great Bedwyn and Chippenham
- Robert Hyde (1650–1722), MP for Hindon 1677–79, 1685–87, and 1689–98, and Wiltshire 1702–27
- Robert Hyde (MP for Abingdon) (c. 1595 – at least 1638), MP for Abingdon 1621, Wootton Bassett 1625, and Cricklade 1626
- Robert Hyde (judge) (1595–1665), English judge
- Robert Hyde (footballer) (born 1954), Australian rules footballer
- Robert F. Hyde, American businessman, lobbyist, and political candidate
- Bob Hyde, a character in the 1978 film Coming Home
