= Joseph Neeld =

British landowner and MP (1789–1856)

Joseph Neeld (1789–1856) was a British landowner and philanthropist. He sat as Member of Parliament for the rotten borough of Gatton, Surrey from March to July 1830 and then for Chippenham, Wiltshire, England until his death.

== Career ==
Neeld was one of five brothers born to Joseph Neeld (1754–1828), a solicitor and Mary (née Bond) (1765–1857); the family lived in Hendon, Middlesex.

He seems to have qualified as a barrister of the Inner Temple but it is known that he set out on a career in property management; in 1821 he took a lease on land in Paddington owned by Westminster Abbey.

In 1828, he inherited the substantial sum of £800,000 from his famous great-uncle, Philip Rundell the silversmith, described by James Losh as a "tyrannical miser". The will stated this was a reward to Neeld for giving up a "lucrative profession" to take care of Rundell for thirteen years. With this bequest, Neeld bought the manor of Grittleton, about six miles northwest of Chippenham. He spent from 8 March to 30 July 1830 as Member of Parliament for Gatton, a rotten borough with six houses and one elector but returning two Members, which was abolished by the Reform Act 1832. Later in 1830 he was elected to represent Chippenham, and held the seat at subsequent elections until his death.

Also in 1828, the year that he bought Grittleton, Neeld also bought Kelston Park, a 1760s country house and estate just west of Bath. He made alterations to the house and outbuildings, but in 1844 the estate was transferred to his relatives the Inigo-Jones family.

He married Lady Caroline Ashley Cooper, daughter of the 6th Earl of Shaftesbury on 1 January 1831; however, the marriage did not last for long. This led to a series of legal disputes which ended with Lady Caroline failing to achieve a divorce, but being granted a legal separation. It had been revealed that Neeld already had a daughter by a French woman, and thus at his death Neeld had no legitimate heirs.

From 1832, Neeld began the reconstruction of Grittleton House in Victorian Gothic revival style, and set about furnishing it with an extensive collection of antiques and paintings. He was also a philanthropist, donating about £12,000 for the construction of Chippenham Town Hall, and building houses in Grittleton for his tenants. Elsewhere in Grittleton parish, at Leigh Delamere he commissioned the rebuilding of St Margaret of Antioch Church (1846) and a row of almshouses (1848).

His parliamentary career was less successful; despite being a Member of Parliament for nearly 24 years, he spoke not once in the House of Commons.

== Death and legacy ==
Neeld died on 24 March 1856, causing a by-election in Chippenham. Leaving no legitimate heirs, he willed his property to his brother John (who in 1859 was created 1st Baronet Neeld, of Grittleton, and was elected MP for Chippenham 1865–1868).

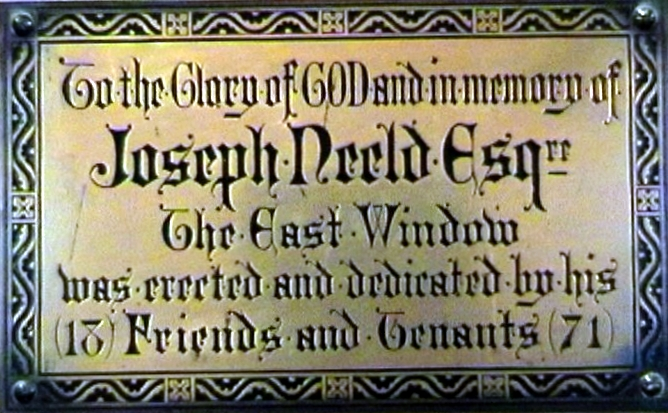
Memorial plaque in Grittleton church

Joseph's name is commemorated in the Neeld Hall in Chippenham, as well as a row of cottages in Hendon which was built in 1870. In Grittleton, his name lives on in the name of the village pub, the Neeld Arms, and in the east window of the church of St Mary the Virgin, accompanied by a plaque stating the window to have been "erected and dedicated by his (18) Friends and Tenants (71)". In Maida Hill, North Westminster, formerly the Borough of Paddington, there are also a Neeld Arms and a Grittleton Road.

Neeld's art collection was split up, some pieces now being in the National Portrait Gallery and some in the Victoria and Albert Museum. A 1669 self-portrait in oil by Rembrandt remained at Grittleton House for some years, passed through several owners including Adolf Hitler, then in 1947 was bought by the Mauritshuis, The Hague, Netherlands.

Parliament of the United Kingdom
| Preceded by William Scott; Michael George Prendergast | Member of Parliament for Gatton; 1830; With: Michael George Prendergast | Succeeded by John Shelley; John Thomas Hope |
| Preceded by Ebenezer Fuller Maitland; Frederick Gye | Member of Parliament for Chippenham; 1830–1856; With: Philip Pusey to 1831; Henry George Boldero 1831–1832; William Fox Talbot 1832–1835; Henry George Boldero from 1835 | Succeeded by Robert Parry Nisbet; Henry George Boldero |
