= William John Lysley =

British politician (1791–1873)

William John Lysley (1791 – 1873) was M.P. for Chippenham, Wiltshire, England from 1859 to 1865.

== Early life and career ==
Lysley was born on 12 December 1791, the son of William Lysley and Ann (née Barker).

He was admitted as a barrister by Inner Temple and in 1828 married Caroline Marshall, daughter of John Marshall of Ardwick House, Lancaster.

In 1851 Lysley was appointed High Sheriff of Hertfordshire. He also held the offices of Deputy Lieutenant and Justice of the Peace; he lived at Mimwood, Hertfordshire and Pewsham, near Chippenham in Wiltshire.

In the general election of 28 April 1859, aged 67, Lysley was elected as the second member for Chippenham as a Liberal.

He was a Fellow of the Society of Antiquaries until his death.

== Legacy ==
Lysley and his wife had four children, Caroline Gertrude (d. 1879), Sarah Maria (d. 1870), William Gerard (13 June 1831 – 6 Oct 1887) and Warine Bayley Marshall.

His name lived on for a time up to 2021, in the name of the Lysley Arms public house at Pewsham.

Parliament of the United Kingdom
Preceded by Robert Parry Nisbet; Henry George Boldero	Member of Parliament for Chippenham; 1859–1865; With: Richard Penruddocke Long	Succeeded by Sir John Neeld, Bt; Gabriel Goldney
Honorary titles
Preceded by Fulke Greville	High Sheriff of Hertfordshire; 1851	Succeeded by Wynn Ellis
