= John Worth =

John Worth may refer to:

- John M. Worth (died 1900), North Carolina politician
- John Worth (Chippenham MP), Member of Parliament for Chippenham
- John Worth (Tiverton MP), Member of Parliament for Tiverton
- John Worth (priest) (died 1688), Irish Anglican Dean
- Les Vandyke (1931–2021), singer who used the pseudonym John Worth
- John Worth, character in Angel and the Badman
