= Robert Viser =

Robert Viser (fl. 1571), was an English haberdasher and Member of Parliament (MP).

He was a Member of the Parliament of England for Chippenham in 1571.

Parliament of England
Preceded by Francis Newdigate; Nicholas Snell	Member of Parliament for Chippenham; 1571; With: John Scott	Succeeded by William Bayly; John Scott
