= Robert Parry Nisbet =

British public man

Robert Parry Nisbet JP DL (1793 – 31 May 1882) was a British public man. He was High Sheriff of Wiltshire in 1849, from 1852 a Deputy Lieutenant for the county, and Conservative Member of Parliament for Chippenham from a by-election in 1856 to the 1859 general election.

After an early career in the Indian Civil Service in Bengal, Nisbet settled at Southbroom House near Devizes, Wiltshire. In his Will, proved in 1882, he left the large fortune of £52,000, including property at Dinapore, India, to his family, £50 to be spent on coals and blankets for the poor of Southbroom, and £1 to each resident of the almshouses near the gates of his house.

Nisbet's grandson Douglas Robert Hadow (1846–1865) was killed in a mountaineering accident a few hours after taking part in the first ascent of the Matterhorn. Another grandson, Frank Hadow, won the Wimbledon championship in 1878.

Parliament of the United Kingdom
Preceded by Joseph Neeld; Henry George Boldero	Member of Parliament for Chippenham; 1856–1859; With: Henry George Boldero	Succeeded by Richard Penruddocke Long; William John Lysley
Honorary titles
Preceded by John Wyndham	High Sheriff of Wiltshire; 1849	Succeeded by Henry Ludlow
