= Henry Goldney =

Henry Goldney may refer to:

- Henry Goldney alias Fernell, MP
- Sir Henry Goldney, 4th Baronet (1886–1974), World War I soldier
