= Grittleton House =

Country house in Wiltshire, England

Coordinates: 51.5187°N 2.2019°W

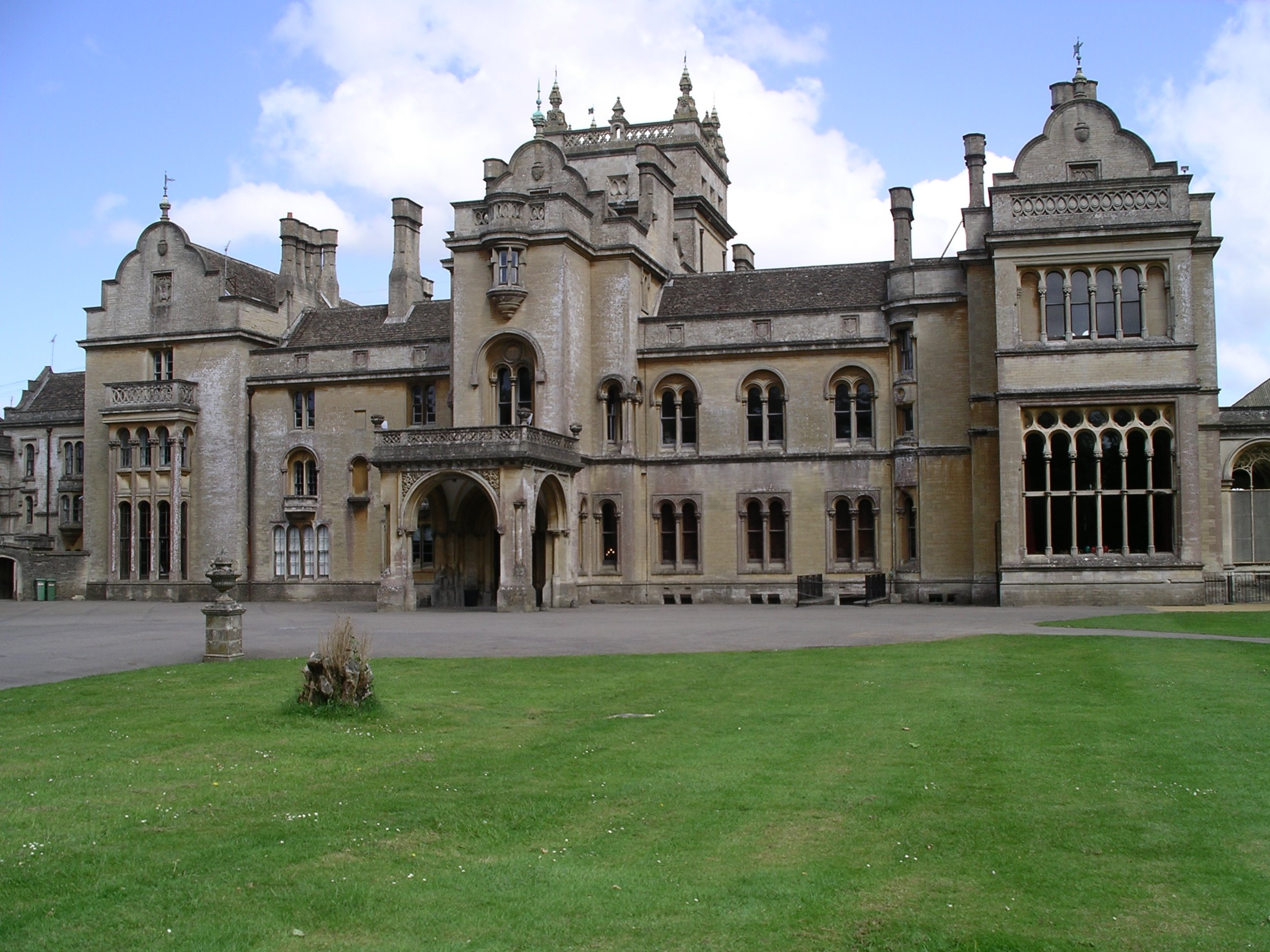
Grittleton House in 2007

Grittleton House is a country house in the village of Grittleton, Wiltshire, England, about 5 1/2 miles (9 km) northwest of the town of Chippenham. It is a building of historical significance and is Grade II* listed on the English Heritage Register.

== History ==
On this site, across the road from St Mary's Church, stood a three-bay Jacobean manor house, dating from 1660. The estate was bought in 1828 by Joseph Neeld, a London lawyer who had inherited a substantial sum, and Grittleton became his country seat.

Architect James Thomson partly refaced and added to this house during 1832–40 for Neeld. In 1852–6 there was a partial demolition of the original manor with the new additions being designed again by Thomson, who was replaced by Henry Clutton in 1853. However, Thomson appears to have completed the house in 1854–6. Pevsner wrote of the house: "It is really a monstrosity. It has Jacobean gables and a Jacobean central tower, but windows of a long, thin, Veneto-Byzantine variety, and odd oriels in unexpected places".

In 1988 the house was designated as a Grade II* listed building. Many notable people have been residents of the house, and today it is a venue for events, particularly weddings.

== Joseph Neeld ==
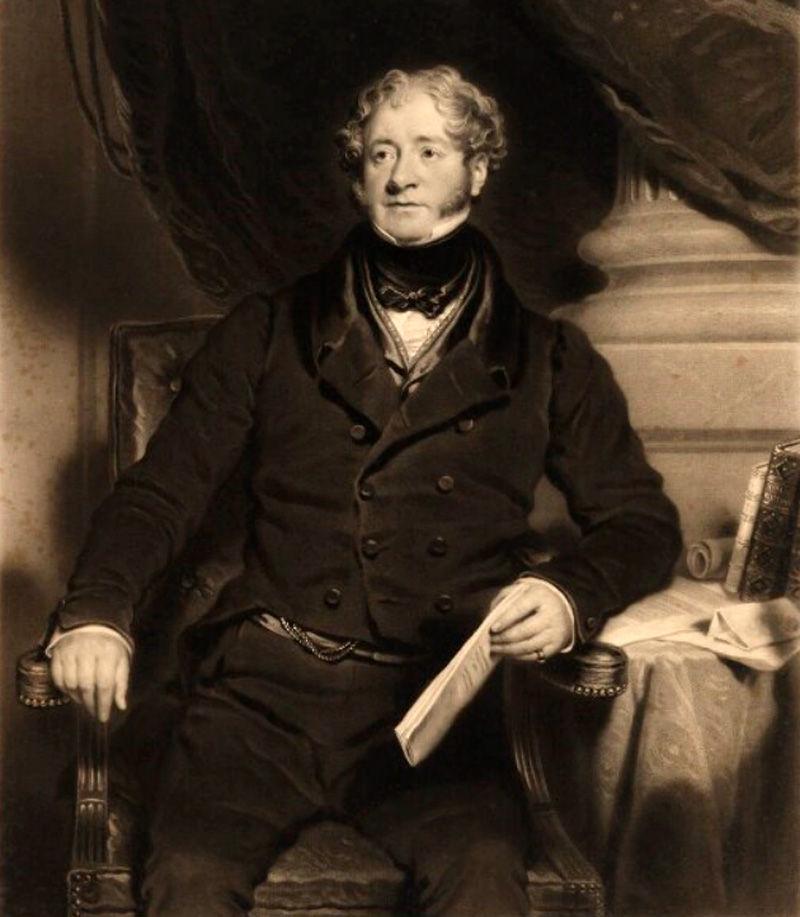
Joseph Neeld in 1837

Joseph Neeld (1789–1856), from Hendon, Middlesex, who commissioned the building of Grittleton House, was a barrister and Member of Parliament. In 1827 he inherited an enormous fortune from his great uncle Philip Rundell who was a London silversmith and had been appointed as Goldsmith and Jeweller to the King.

Neeld was a collector of British art, and – according to the historian John Britton – by about 1830 he had numerous works by Chantrey, Gibson, Baily, Wyatt, Papworth, Constable, Gainsborough, Etty, Roberts, Stanfield, Wilson, Ward, West, and many others. He desired a house that was more in keeping with his status and would be able to accommodate his collection of sculpture and paintings. He therefore commissioned the architect James Thomson to make substantial additions to the existing manor house.

== Other residents ==
When Joseph Neeld died in 1856, the house was inherited by his younger brother Sir John Neeld (1805–1891), Member of Parliament for Cricklade from 1835 to 1859. In 1845 he married Harriet Eliza Dickson, daughter of Major General William Dickson of Beneham House, Berkshire. They lived at Grittleton House for 35 years and held numerous Balls which were reported in the newspapers. In 1864 one of these events, which was for 400 guests, was described in the following terms:

"The company began to assemble at 9.30, and were received by Lady and Miss Neeld in the vestibule of the two galleries. The western gallery was appropriated to dancing, and in the large bay window at the end a full band was stationed. The eastern gallery was fitted as a drawing-room. In addition, the library, with its splendid collection of books and prints was thrown open. Refreshments were served in Sir John's own library, and card tables were placed in the ordinary drawing-room, the dining-room being reserved for supper. The whole of the rooms and corridors were amply lit with gas, throwing its brilliancy on the priceless pictures and statuary, and bringing the general decorations out in bold relief. It was a perfect fairy scene, and when, after the first look at the dancing, the company, young and old, began to circulate round the upper staircases and corridors, whether viewed from above or below, was really beyond description."

"The Duke and Duchess were among the earlier arrivals, and entered joyously into the spirit of the scene. Full and overflowing, the dancing room soon supplied the vestibule with dancers, and there would have been ample occupants had both the galleries been used for dancing. At a fitting hour, but which we cannot say, for time flew too merrily to be taken note of, a splendid supper was served, and weary must have become the fingers of that attentive man who from the moment he opened his first bottle of champagne, continued the operation without ceasing, and we left him still doing it at 4 o'clock. Long will the opening of the house of Grittleton in 1864 be remembered."

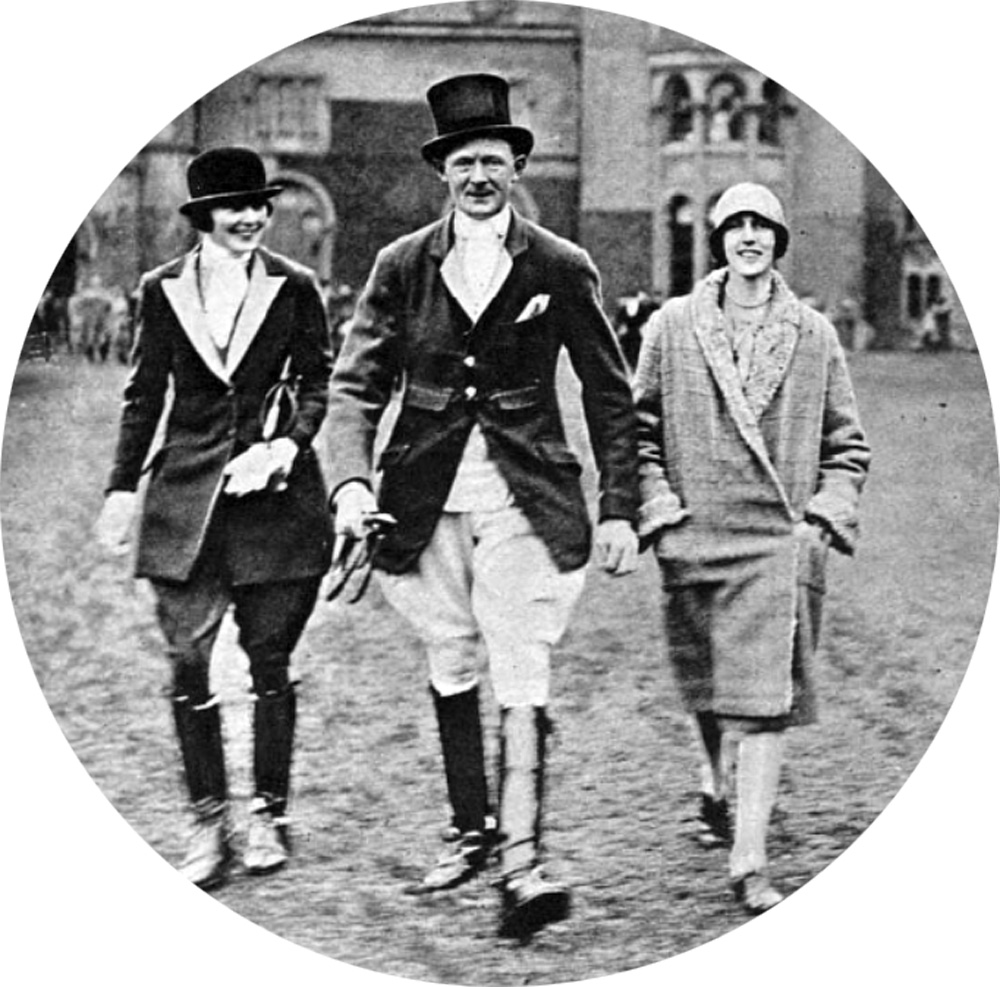
Members of the Beaufort Hunt Miss Peggy Ward and the Earl and Countess of Westmorland at Grittleton House for the 80th birthday of Sir Audley Neeld in 1929

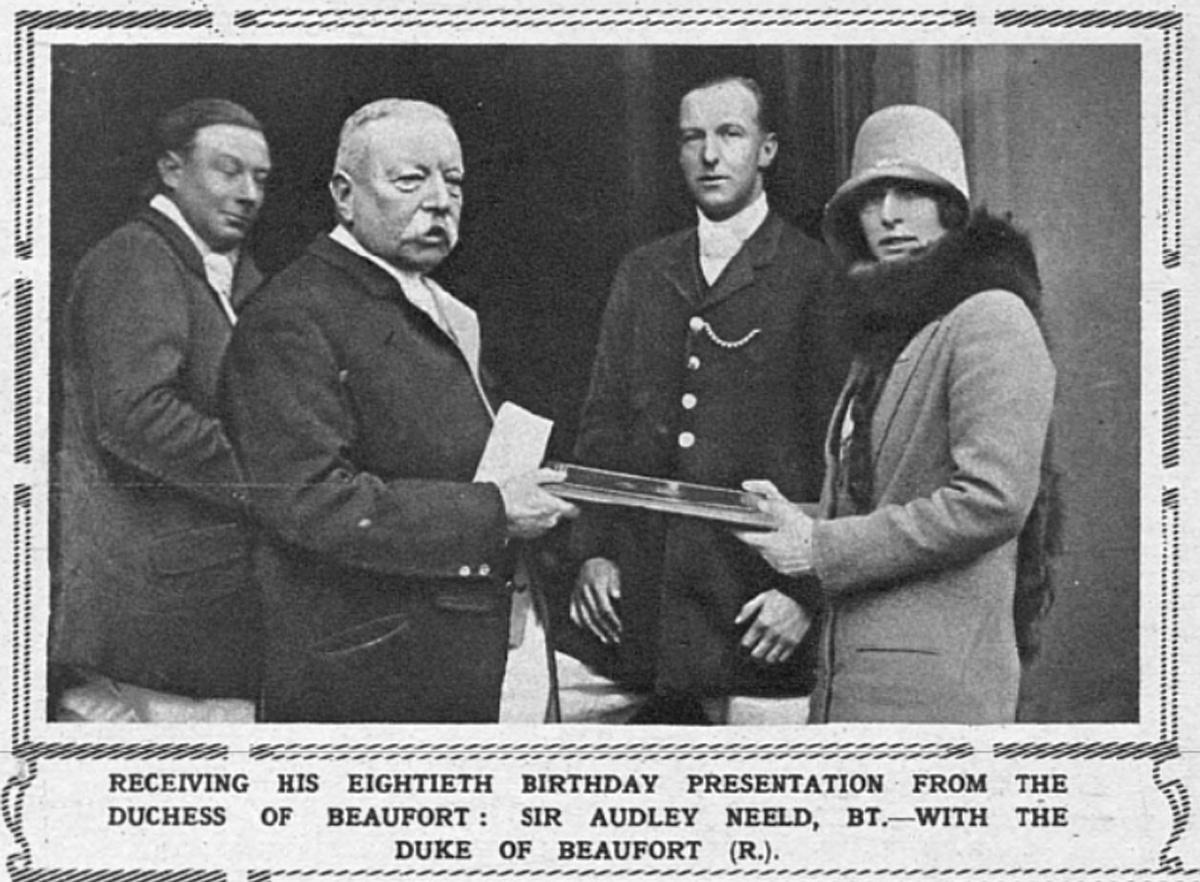
Sir Audley Neeld at Grittleton House in 1929

When Sir John died in 1891, his eldest son Sir Algernon William Neeld, 2nd Baronet, became the owner. After his death in 1900, Sir Audley Dallas Neeld, Algernon's younger brother, inherited the house. Audley was the owner for the next 41 years until his death in 1941 at the age of 92.

Audley Neeld was born in 1849 at Holt, Wiltshire. He was educated at Harrow and the University of Oxford. In 1873 he married the Hon Edith Vivian, daughter of the second Lord Vivian, but the couple had no children. He joined the 2nd Life Guards and became a commanding officer. He fought in the Boer War and when he returned in 1900 he took up residence in Grittleton House which he had recently inherited.

He was a long-term member of the Beaufort Hunt and in 1929 the members celebrated his 80th Birthday at Grittleton House. He died in 1941, and as he had no heirs the property was inherited by a descendant of Joseph Neeld's illegitimate daughter Ann Maria, wife of Lieutenant Colonel Inigo William Jones. The new owner was Lionel Inigo-Jones.

Lionel William Neeld Inigo-Jones (1885–1956) and his successors remained at their main home, Kelston Park near Bath, and rented Grittleton House to various tenants. During the 1940s the house was used by the MOD to store historical documents. Also during this period, foreign fighter pilots stayed at the house. In 1948 a private girls' school rented the property and in 1967 Joanna Shipp, who had been running her own private day school in Rangeworthy Court, Gloucestershire since 1951, moved into the house. In 1972 she bought the property and began extensive renovations. The Shipp family still owns the house and today it is a venue for special events, particularly weddings.

== Associated buildings ==
Thomson designed an extensive complex of stables, coach houses and related facilities, built to the south of the house c. 1835. Nearby improvements to the estate included the destruction of the hamlet of Upper Foscote, except for one 17th-century house.

Thomson also designed Fosse Lodge, in the north of the estate on the Fosse Way, with a tall, octagonal tower (1835); and Malmesbury Lodge in Grittleton village (c. 1840), its octagonal spirelet with bell-stage noted as "remarkable" in the building's National Heritage List entry. Stable Lodge, at the entrance to the stables on the Yatton Keynell road, and Woodman's Lodge, in the southeast, are of similar date. West Lodge, at the principal western entrance to Grittleton House, was built in 1854–5 to designs by Clutton, based on the plan of Malmesbury Lodge.

== School ==
The house was the home of Grittleton House School between 1951 and 2016.
