= John Proctor (MP) =

16th-century English politician

John Proctor (1520? – 1558/59) was an English politician.

He was a member (MP) of the parliament of England for Chippenham in November 1554.
