= Thomas Gay (MP) =

English politician

Thomas Gay (fl. 1378–1390) was an English merchant and Member of Parliament. Little is recorded of him.

He was a member (MP) of the parliament of England for Chippenham in 1381, May 1382, October 1383, April 1384, November 1384, 1386, February 1388, September 1388, and January 1390.
