= William Robert Robins =

British trade unionist and politician

William Robert Robins OBE (1886 – 28 September 1959) was a British trade unionist and politician.

Born at Osmaston, Derby, Robins was the son of John Robins, a railway wagon builder originally from Yeovil who moved his family to Swindon about 1893. He was brought up as a Primitive Methodist. He found work as a railway clerk. In 1908, he joined the Railway Clerks' Association (RCA). Three years later, the RCA had enough members in the town to form a branch, and he became its first organising secretary, serving until 1919. From 1918 until 1921, he also served as the secretary of Swindon Trades Council, and in 1919, he was elected as a Labour Party member of the town council. From 1918 until 1925, he was the chairman of the RCA's Western Divisional Council, then from 1925 until 1931 he served on the union's executive committee.

Robins stood in Cirencester and Tewkesbury at the 1922 and 1923 United Kingdom general elections, with the sponsorship of his union. On each occasion, he took second place, with about one third of the vote. He became increasingly prominent in local politics. In 1928, he was elected as an alderman, then served as Mayor of Swindon for 1932/33. At the national level, he was unsuccessful in Chippenham at the 1929, 1931, and 1935 United Kingdom general elections, and although he was selected as Prospective Parliamentary Candidate for Exeter in 1939, no election took place until 1945, by which time he had been replaced. In October 1939, Robins was registered under the National Registration Act 1939 as a railway clerk.

In the 1948 Birthday Honours, he was made an Officer of the Order of the British Empire, while in 1951, he was awarded the Freedom of Swindon. He served as the first chairman of the committee which produced the Wiltshire Victoria County History, resigning shortly before his death in 1959.

Robins died on 28 September 1959 at St Margaret’s Hospital, Stratton St Margaret, leaving a widow, Daisy, of 318 Cricklade Road, Swindon.
