= Daniel Awdry =

British politician (1924–2008)

Daniel Edmund Awdry TD DL (10 September 1924 – 11 October 2008) was a British Conservative Party politician.

Awdry was educated at Winchester College and the Royal Military College, Sandhurst. He served with the 10th Hussars in Italy 1944–45 and with the Royal Wiltshire Yeomanry 1947–62. He became a solicitor and a Chippenham councillor, serving as Mayor 1958–59. He was President of the Southern Boroughs Association 1959–60.

Awdry was member of parliament for Chippenham from a 1962 by-election until 1979, when he stood down—having seen off strong challenges from Liberal candidates in the seat (his majority in October 1974 was 1,749 (3.3%)). His successor was Richard Needham.

Parliament of the United Kingdom
Preceded by David Eccles	Member of Parliament for Chippenham; 1962–1979	Succeeded by Richard Needham
