= Robert Chandler (MP for Chippenham) =

14th-century English politician

Robert Chandler (fl. 1380s) was an English Member of Parliament.

He was a Member (MP) of the Parliament of England for Chippenham in May 1382 and 1386. Nothing else is recorded of him.
