= Thomas Wilkes (Chippenham MP) =

16th-century English politician

Thomas Wilkes (by 1508 – 1536/37), of Chippenham, Wiltshire, was an English politician.

He was a member (MP) of the parliament of England for Chippenham in 1529.
