= Alfred Bonwick =

British politician

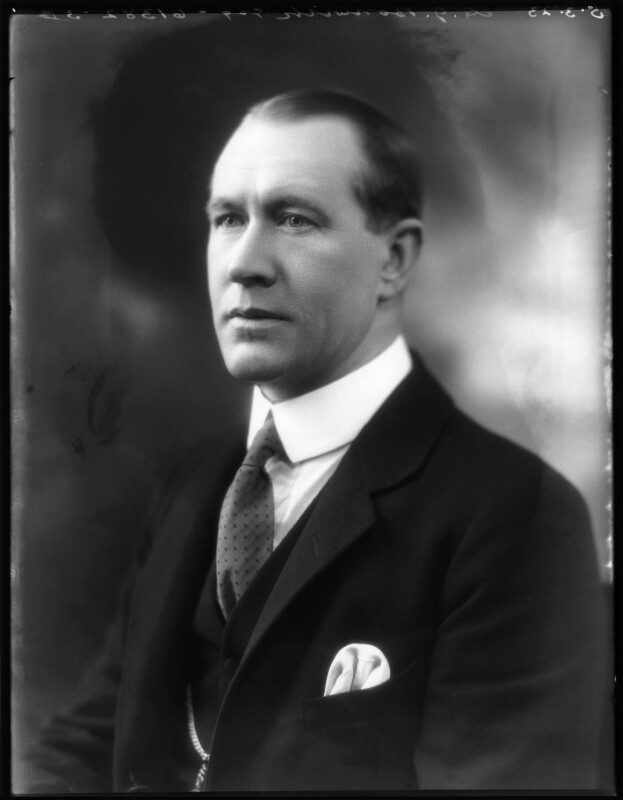
Alfred Bonwick

Alfred James Bonwick (1 November 1883 – 4 September 1949) was a Liberal Party politician in the United Kingdom.

== Background ==
He was born in London, the only son of James Bonwick and Elizabeth Fowler. In 1909 he married Florence Elizabeth Robinson. They had one daughter.

== Professional career ==
He was a director of a bottle making company. He was Secretary of The Nation magazine. He was a business manager for a variety of newspapers owned by the Joseph Rowntree Social Service Trust.

== Political career ==
He was Liberal candidate for the Unionist seat of the Chippenham division of Wiltshire at the 1922 General Election. He was a supporter of H. H. Asquith and an opponent of the Coalition Government of David Lloyd George. He was elected as Member of Parliament (MP) at the first attempt, defeating the Conservative MP George Terrell. This was the first time a Liberal had won Chippenham since the landslide election of 1906;

General election 1922: Chippenham Electorate 27,682
Party	Candidate	Votes	%	±%
Liberal	Alfred James Bonwick	10,494	48.6	+19.4
Unionist	George John Edmond De Beauvoir Terrell	10,006	46.3	−6.8
Labour	William Robert Roberts	1,098	5.1	−12.6
Majority		488	2.3	26.2
Turnout			78.0	+16.7
Liberal gain from Unionist		Swing	+13.1	

In 1923 he was appointed a Member of the Committee of Enquiry into Government Printing Establishments, on which he sat for 4 years. Against a national background that was witnessing a Liberal revival, Bonwick was re-elected in 1923 with an increased majority;

General election 1923: Chippenham Electorate 28,315
Party	Candidate	Votes	%	±%
Liberal	Alfred James Bonwick	11,953	51.7	+3.1
Unionist	Victor Alexander Cazalet	11,156	48.3	+2.0
Majority		797	3.4	+1.1
Turnout			81.6	
Liberal hold		Swing	+0.6	

In May 1924 he was appointed as a Liberal Party Whip. At the 1924 general election he lost the seat to the Conservative Victor Cazalet, a loss that was in line with results elsewhere in the country;

General election 1924: Chippenham Electorate 29,135
Party	Candidate	Votes	%	±%
Unionist	Victor Alexander Cazalet	13,227	54.6	+6.3
Liberal	Alfred James Bonwick	11,015	45.4	−6.3
Majority		2,212	9.2	12.6
Turnout			83.2	+1.6
Unionist gain from Liberal		Swing	+6.3	

After his election defeat he continued as Liberal prospective parliamentary candidate for Chippenham until December 1926 when he resigned, citing business pressures. He did not stand for parliament again. After the election, Lloyd George's influence in the party grew, particularly with regard to policy development. Lloyd George's new land policy was winning support within the party but Bonwick was opposed to it. In 1927, after Lloyd George became Liberal Party leader, former supporters of Asquith formed the Liberal Council, to rally opposition to Lloyd George. Bonwick joined this group and was elected to its General Committee.

He served as a Justice of the peace.

Parliament of the United Kingdom
Preceded by George Terrell	Member of Parliament for Chippenham; 1922–1924	Succeeded by Victor Cazalet
