= Thomas Smith (MP for Chippenham) =

English politician

Thomas Smith (fl. 1554) was an English politician.

He was a member (MP) of the parliament of England for Chippenham in April 1554.
