= Robert Wrastley =

16th-century English politician

Robert Wrastley or Wrestley was an English politician.

He was a member (MP) of the parliament of England for Chippenham in October 1553.
