= John Suyput =

English politician

John Suyput (fl. 1388) was an English politician.

He was a Member (MP) of the Parliament of England for Chippenham in February 1388. No further information on him has been identified.
