= George Terrell =

British politician

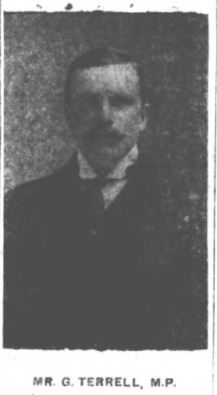
George Terrell, taken from the 4 January 1919 edition of the Wiltshire Times and Trowbridge Advertiser

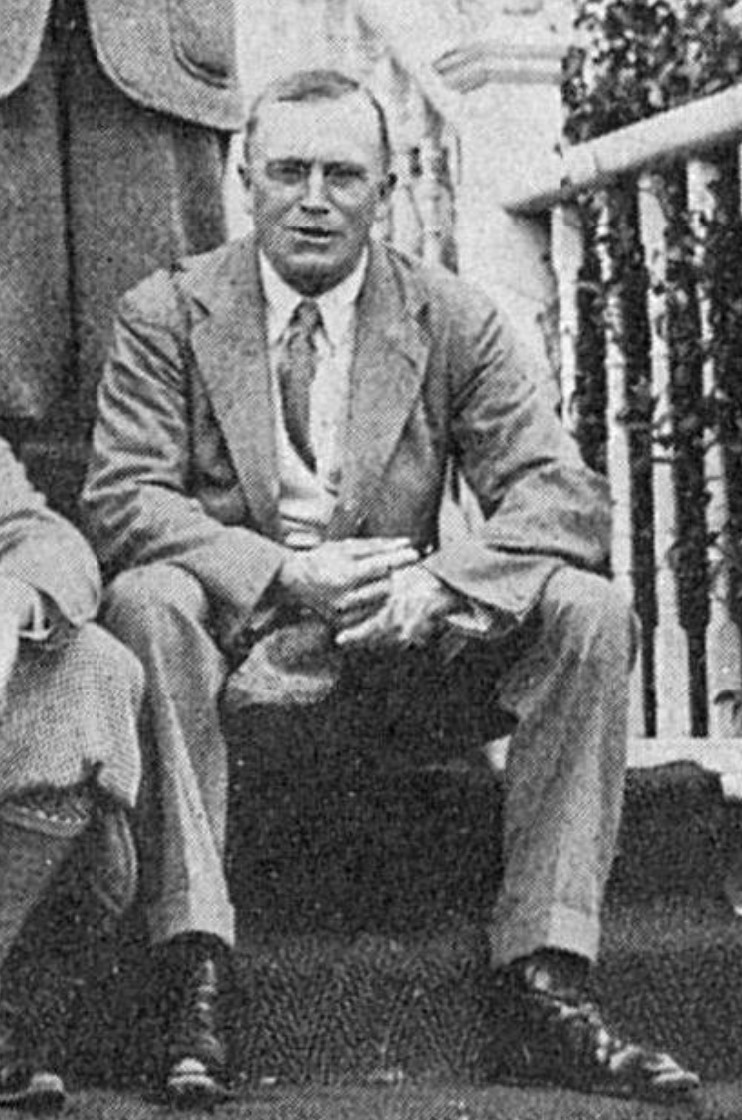
George Terrell pictured at a golf tournament in The Tatler - Wednesday 11 October 1922

George John Edmond de Beauvoir Terrell (23 April 1862 – 7 November 1952) was a Conservative Party politician in the United Kingdom.

Originally a solicitor, he was elected as member of parliament (MP) for Chippenham at the January 1910 general election, defeating the Liberal incumbent John Poynder Dickson. At the December 1918 general election he was challenged by Liberal candidate Albert Bennett and Labour party candidate Reuben George, but beat both of them to retain his seat as MP. He held the Chippenham seat until his defeat at the 1922 general election by the Liberal candidate Alfred Bonwick.

He married Mary Logan in Lambeth in 1884, and after her death remarried to Grace Carne (née Hawkins) at St George Hanover Square in 1897. He was the father of Sir Reginald Terrell by his first wife Mary; unusually, father and son sat in Parliament at the same time, with Reginald representing Henley from 1918 until 1924. In later life he was a company director.

Parliament of the United Kingdom
Preceded by Sir John Poynder Dickson	Member of Parliament for Chippenham; January 1910 – 1922	Succeeded by Alfred Bonwick
