= William Nevill =

William Nevill may refer to:

- William Nevill, 1st Marquess of Abergavenny (1826–1915), British peer
- William Nevill, 16th Baron Bergavenny (bef. 1701 – 1744), British peer
- William Nevill, 4th Earl of Abergavenny (1792–1868), British peer
- William Beauchamp Nevill (1860–1939), English aristocrat

== See also ==
- Charles William Nevill (1815–1888), Welsh MP and businessman
