= Henry Goldney alias Fernell =

16th-century English politician

Henry Goldney (Farnell, Affernewell), alias Fernell (by 1517 – 1572/73), was an English politician.

He was a member (MP) of the parliament of England for Chippenham in October 1553.
