= Edward Baynard (sheriff) =

16th-century English politician

Edward Baynard (c. 1512–1575) was an English politician.

He was a Member (MP) of the Parliament of England for Chippenham.
