= John Worth (Chippenham MP) =

English politician

John Worth (fl. 1413) was an English politician.

He was a Member (MP) of the Parliament of England for Chippenham in May 1413.
