= Chippenham (constituency) =

UK Parliament constituency (1295–1983, 2010–present)

- Borough constituency for the House of Commons
- Interactive map of boundaries from 2024
- Boundary of Chippenham in South West England
- County: Wiltshire
- Population: 96,336 (2011 census)
- Electorate: 71,648 (2023)
- Major settlements: Chippenham, Calne, Royal Wootton Bassett, Corsham

Current constituency
- Created: 2010
- Member of Parliament: Sarah Gibson (Liberal Democrats)
- Seats: One
- Created from: Westbury, North Wiltshire

1295–1983
- Seats: One (two, 1295–1868)
- Replaced by: North Wiltshire

Chippenham is a constituency (Note: A borough constituency (for the purposes of election expenses and type of returning officer)) represented in the House of Commons of the Parliament of the United Kingdom since 2024 by Sarah Gibson, a Liberal Democrat. (Note: As with all constituencies, the constituency elects one Member of Parliament (MP) by the first past the post system of election at least every five years.) The 2024 constituency includes the Wiltshire towns of Calne, Chippenham, Corsham and Royal Wootton Bassett.

In May 2023, the incumbent Chippenham MP, Michelle Donelan, announced she would be standing for the new Melksham and Devizes constituency. In July 2023, the local Conservative Association announced that their candidate for the new Chippenham constituency would be a local unitary councillor, Nic Puntis.

== Constituency profile ==
The Chippenham constituency is located in Wiltshire and is mostly rural. Its largest town is Chippenham with a population of around 37,000. Other settlements include the towns of Corsham, Calne and Royal Wootton Bassett and the village and military base of Lyneham. Chippenham is a historic market town and the area houses many workers who commute to nearby Swindon, Bath and Bristol. Most of the constituency is affluent, particularly Chippenham's Pewsham ward which is one of the 10% least-deprived areas in England.

Compared to national averages, residents of the constituency have high incomes and average levels of education and professional employment. White people made up 94% of the population in 2021. At the local county council, most of the constituency is represented by Liberal Democrats, although Reform UK councillors were elected in Calne and Conservatives were elected in some rural areas at the 2025 Wiltshire Council election. An estimated 51% of voters in the constituency supported leaving the European Union in the 2016 referendum, similar to the nationwide figure.

== History ==
A parliamentary borough of Chippenham was enfranchised in 1295. It sent two burgesses to Parliament until 1868 and one thereafter until the borough constituency was abolished in 1885. There was a county division constituency named after the town of Chippenham from 1885 to 1983, when the name of that constituency was changed to North Wiltshire.

Following the 2003–2005 review into parliamentary representation in Wiltshire, the Boundary Commission created a new county constituency, reviving the name of Chippenham, effective from the 2010 general election. It was formed from parts of the previously existing Devizes, North Wiltshire and Westbury constituencies. Further boundary changes came into effect at the 2024 general election.

== Boundaries ==
=== Historical boundaries ===
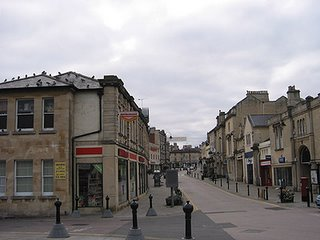
Chippenham is the largest town in rural North Wiltshire and in the new constituency.

1295–1832: The parliamentary borough of Chippenham in the unreformed Parliament consisted of only part of the parish of Chippenham in Wiltshire. However, as Chippenham was a burgage borough, in which the right to vote was confined to the resident occupiers of specific properties, the boundary had no practical function. The borough had a population of 1,620 in 1831, for 283 houses.

1832–1885: The Boundary Act which accompanied the Great Reform Act extended the boundaries of the parliamentary borough, to include the whole of Chippenham parish, the adjoining parishes of Hardenhuish and Langley Burrell, as well as the extra-parochial district of Pewsham. This more than trebled the borough's population, to 5,270 by the 1831 figures, for 883 houses.

1885–1918: During this period, Wiltshire was split into five county divisions and one borough, of which The North-Western (or Chippenham) Division of Wiltshire was one; it was often colloquially referred to simply as either Chippenham or as North-West Wiltshire. It was bordered by the Cricklade division to the east, Westbury to the south and Devizes to the southeast. Over the county boundary were the Thornbury division of Gloucestershire to the west, the Cirencester division of Gloucestershire to the north and the Frome division of Somerset to the southwest.

The Chippenham division included the towns of Calne and Malmesbury as well as Chippenham, both of which had also been parliamentary boroughs in their own right before 1885. By the outbreak of World War I, the population of the constituency was about 45,000.

1918–1950: In 1918 Wiltshire was split into five divisions, but there was no borough constituency in the county. The Wiltshire, Chippenham division was expanded, taking in the towns of Cricklade and Wootton Bassett, also former parliamentary boroughs, as well as the surrounding rural areas: in full, it was composed of the then Municipal Boroughs of Calne, Chippenham, and Malmesbury, and the Rural Districts of Calne, Chippenham, Malmesbury, Cricklade and Wootton Bassett (part), and Tetbury (excluding the part in the administrative county of Gloucestershire).

1950–1983: In the redistribution which took effect at the 1950 general election, Wiltshire was divided into one borough and four county constituencies. Chippenham County Constituency consisted of the same Municipal Boroughs as in 1918 and the Rural Districts of Calne and Chippenham, Cricklade and Wootton Bassett, and Malmesbury.

1983–2010: Constituency replaced by North Wiltshire.

Map of boundaries 2010–2024

2010–2024: The North Wiltshire wards of Cepen Park, Chippenham Allington, Chippenham Audley, Chippenham Avon, Chippenham Hill Rise, Chippenham London Road, Chippenham Monkton Park, Chippenham Park, Chippenham Pewsham, Chippenham Redland, Chippenham Westcroft/Queens, Corsham, Lacock with Neston and Gastard, and Pickwick, and the West Wiltshire wards of Atworth and Whitley, Bradford-on-Avon North, Bradford-on-Avon South, Holt, Manor Vale (i.e. Limpley Stoke, Monkton Farleigh, South Wraxall, Westwood and Winsley), Melksham North, Melksham Spa, Melksham Without, Melksham Woodrow, Paxcroft.

The constituency was re-established as a result of increasing the number of seats in Wiltshire from six to seven. Chippenham and Corsham were transferred from North Wiltshire; Melksham from Devizes; and Bradford-on-Avon from Westbury.

=== Current boundaries ===
Further to the 2023 Periodic Review of Westminster constituencies which came into effect for the 2024 general election, the constituency is composed of the following Wiltshire electoral divisions (as they existed on 4 May 2021):

Calne Central, Calne Chilvester & Abberd, Calne North, Calne Rural, Chippenham Cepen Park & Derriads, Chippenham Cepen Park & Hunters Moon, Chippenham Hardenhuish, Chippenham Hardens & Central, Chippenham Lowden & Rowden, Chippenham Monkton, Chippenham Pewsham, Chippenham Sheldon, Corsham Ladbrook, Corsham Pickwick, Corsham Without, Lyneham, Royal Wootton Bassett East, Royal Wootton Bassett North, and Royal Wootton Bassett South & West.

The constituency was realigned to retain Chippenham and Corsham, and gained most of Calne, Lyneham and Royal Wootton Bassett from the abolished North Wiltshire constituency. Bradford-on-Avon and Melksham became part of a new Melksham and Devizes constituency.

== Members of Parliament ==
=== MPs 1295–1640 ===
Parliament	First member	Second member
1386	Thomas Gay	Robert Chandler
1388 (Feb)	Thomas Gay	John Suyput
1388 (Sep)	Thomas Gay	Thomas Lote
1390 (Jan)	Thomas Gay	Thomas Lote
1390 (Nov)		
1391		
1393		
1394	Nicholas Sambourn	Hugh de la Lynde
1413 (May)	John Worth	
1510–1523	No names known	
1529	William Button	Thomas Wilkes
1536		
1539		
1542		
1545	Robert Warner	John Bonham
1547	John Astley	Francis Goldsmith
1553 (Mar)	?	
1553 (Oct)	Robert Wrastley	Henry Goldney alias Fernell
1554 (Apr)	William Smith	Thomas Smith
1554 (Nov)	Cyriak Petyt	John Proctor
1555	Nicholas Snell	John Pollard
1558	Sir John Sulyard	William Neville
1559	Edward Baynard	Nicholas Snell
1562	Francis Newdigate	Nicholas Snell
1571	John Scott	Robert Viser
1572	William Bayly	John Scott
1584	Robert Baynard	Robert Hyde
1586	Lawrence Hyde	Robert Hyde
1589	Henry Baynton	William Swayne
1593	Edward Maria Wingfield	Francis Harvey
1597	Thomas Edmondes, went abroad and was replaced 1597 by Edward Wymarke	Sharington Talbot
1601	Robert Berkeley	Edward Wymarke
1604	John Hungerford	General John Roberts
1614	William Maynard	Thomas Colepeper
1621–1622	Sir Edward Hungerford	John Bayly
1624	Sir John Maynard	Sir Francis Popham
1625	Sir John Maynard	Sir Francis Popham
1626	Sir Edward Bayntun	Sir Francis Popham
1628	Sir Francis Popham	Sir John Eyres
1629–1640	No Parliaments summoned	

=== MPs 1640–1868 ===
Year	First member	First party	Second member	Second party
April 1640	Sir Edward Hungerford	Parliamentarian	Sir Edward Bayntun	
November 1640	Sir Edward Hungerford	Parliamentarian	Sir Edward Bayntun	Parliamentarian
1648	William Eyre		Sir Edward Bayntun	Parliamentarian
1653	Chippenham was unrepresented in the Barebones Parliament and the First and Second Parliaments of the Protectorate			
January 1659	Sir Edward Hungerford		James Stedman	
May 1659	Chippenham was unrepresented in the restored Rump			
April 1660	Edward Hungerford		Edward Poole	
April 1661	Edward Hungerford		Henry Bayntun	
July 1661	Sir Hugh Speke		Henry Bayntun	
August 1661	Sir Edward Hungerford		Henry Bayntun	
1673	Sir Edward Hungerford		Francis Gwyn	
February 1679	Sir Edward Hungerford		Sir John Talbot	
August 1679	Sir Edward Hungerford		Samuel Ashe	
1681	Sir Edward Hungerford		Sir George Speke	
March 1685	Henry Bayntun		Sharington Talbot, killed in duel, 1685	
August 1685	Henry Bayntun		Richard Kent	
1689	Henry Bayntun		Nicholas Bayntun	
February 1690	Richard Kent		Alexander Popham	
December 1690	Sir Basil Firebrace	Tory	Alexander Popham	
1692	Thomas Tollemache		Alexander Popham	
1694	Richard Long		Alexander Popham	
1695	Walter White		Alexander Popham	
1698	Walter White		Edward Montagu	
1701	Walter White		Viscount Mordaunt	
1702	James Montagu		Viscount Mordaunt	
May 1705	Walter White		Sir James Long	
November 1705	Viscount Mordaunt		Sir James Long	
1708	James Montagu		Sir James Long	
1710	Joseph Ashe		Sir James Long	
1711	Francis Popham		Sir James Long	
1713	Sir John Eyles		John Norris	
1715	Sir John Eyles		Giles Earle	
1722	Sir John Eyles		Edward Rolt	
1723	Sir John Eyles		Thomas Boucher	
1727	Rogers Holland		Gabriel Roberts	
1734	Rogers Holland		Richard Long	
1737	Sir Edward Bayntun-Rolt		Richard Long	
1741	Sir Edward Bayntun-Rolt		Sir Edmond Thomas	
1754	Sir Edward Bayntun-Rolt		Sir Samuel Fludyer	
1768	Sir Edward Bayntun-Rolt		Sir Thomas Fludyer	
1769	Sir Edward Bayntun-Rolt		Henry Dawkins	
1774	Sir Edward Bayntun-Rolt		Samuel Marsh	
1780	Henry Dawkins		Giles Hudson	
1783	Henry Dawkins		George Fludyer	
1784	James Dawkins	Tory	George Fludyer	
1802	James Dawkins	Tory	Charles Brooke	Whig
1803	James Dawkins	Tory	John Maitland	Tory
1806	Charles Brooke	Whig	John Maitland	Tory
1807	James Dawkins	Tory	John Maitland	Tory
1812	Charles Brooke	Whig	Robert Peel	Tory
1817	Charles Brooke	Whig	John Maitland	Tory
1818	William Miles	Tory	Marquess of Blandford	Tory
1820	William Madocks	Whig	John Rock Grossett	Whig
1826	Ebenezer Maitland	Tory	Frederick Gye	Tory
1830	Joseph Neeld	Tory	Philip Pusey	Tory
1831	Joseph Neeld	Tory	Henry George Boldero	Tory
1832	Joseph Neeld	Tory	Henry Fox Talbot	Whig
1834	Joseph Neeld	Conservative	Henry Fox Talbot	Whig
1835	Joseph Neeld	Conservative	Henry George Boldero	Conservative
1856	Robert Parry Nisbet	Conservative	Henry George Boldero	Conservative
1859	Richard Penruddocke Long	Conservative	William John Lysley	Liberal
1865	Sir John Neeld	Conservative	Gabriel Goldney	Conservative
1868	Representation reduced to one member			

=== MPs 1868–1983 ===
Election	Member	Party
1868	Gabriel Goldney	Conservative
1885	Borough constituency abolished – county division created	
1885	Banister Fletcher	Liberal
1886	Lord Henry Bruce	Conservative
1892	Sir John Dickson-Poynder	Conservative
1905	Sir John Dickson-Poynder	Liberal
1910	George Terrell	Conservative
1922	Alfred Bonwick	Liberal
1924	Victor Cazalet	Conservative
1943 by-election	Sir David Eccles	Conservative
1962 by-election	Daniel Awdry	Conservative
1979	Richard Needham	Conservative
1983	Constituency abolished	

=== MPs since 2010 ===
The Chippenham name was revived in 2010 for the new constituency that includes Bradford on Avon, Chippenham, Corsham.

Election	Member	Party
2010	Duncan Hames	Liberal Democrat
2015	Michelle Donelan	Conservative
2024	Sarah Gibson	Liberal Democrat

== Elections ==
=== Elections in the 2020s ===
General election 2024: Chippenham
Party	Candidate	Votes	%	±%
Liberal Democrats	Sarah Gibson	22,552	45.5	+15.2
Conservative	Nic Puntis	14,414	29.1	−27.3
Reform	Benjamin Ginsburg	6,127	12.4	N/A
Labour	Ravi Venkatesh	3,925	7.9	−3.8
Green	Declan Baseley	1,954	3.9	+2.2
Independent	Ed Deedigan	540	1.1	N/A
Majority		8,138	16.4	N/A
Turnout		49,512	68.3	−2.1
Registered electors		72,492		
Liberal Democrats gain from Conservative		Swing	+21.3	

=== Elections in the 2010s ===
2019 notional result
Party	Vote	%
Conservative	28,485	56.4
Liberal Democrats	15,285	30.3
Labour	5,896	11.7
Green	853	1.7
Turnout	50,519	70.5
Electorate	71,648	

General election 2019: Chippenham
Party	Candidate	Votes	%	±%
Conservative	Michelle Donelan	30,994	54.3	−0.4
Liberal Democrats	Helen Belcher	19,706	34.5	+8.9
Labour	Martha Anachury	6,399	11.2	−8.5
Majority		11,288	19.8	−9.3
Turnout		57,099	73.9	−0.9
Conservative hold		Swing	-4.6	

General election 2017: Chippenham
Party	Candidate	Votes	%	±%
Conservative	Michelle Donelan	31,267	54.7	+7.1
Liberal Democrats	Helen Belcher	14,637	25.6	−3.8
Labour	Andy Newman	11,236	19.7	+11.5
Majority		16,630	29.1	+10.9
Turnout		57,140	74.8	+0.1
Conservative hold		Swing	+5.5	

General election 2015: Chippenham
Party	Candidate	Votes	%	±%
Conservative	Michelle Donelan	26,354	47.6	+6.6
Liberal Democrats	Duncan Hames	16,278	29.4	−16.4
UKIP	Julia Reid	5,884	10.6	+7.2
Labour	Andy Newman	4,561	8.2	+1.3
Green	Tina Johnston	2,330	4.2	+3.3
Majority		10,076	18.2	N/A
Turnout		55,407	74.7	+2.0
Conservative gain from Liberal Democrats		Swing	+11.5	

General election 2010: Chippenham
Party	Candidate	Votes	%	±%
Liberal Democrats	Duncan Hames	23,970	45.8	+3.3
Conservative	Wilfred Emmanuel-Jones	21,500	41.0	+3.3
Labour	Greg Lovell	3,620	6.9	−9.9
UKIP	Julia Reid	1,783	3.4	+0.3
BNP	Michael Simpkins	641	1.2	New
Green	Samantha Fletcher	446	0.9	New
English Democrat	John Maguire	307	0.6	New
Christian	Richard Sexton	118	0.2	New
Majority		2,470	4.8	
Turnout		52,385	72.7	
Liberal Democrats win (new seat)				

=== Elections in the 1970s ===
General election 1979: Chippenham
Party	Candidate	Votes	%	±%
Conservative	Richard Needham	29,308	49.19	+6.62
Liberal	Ronald EJ Banks	24,611	41.30	+2.00
Labour	Catherine LB Inchley	5,146	8.64	−9.03
Ecology	Bert Pettit	521	0.87	New
Majority		4,697	7.89	+4.62
Turnout		59,586	79.96	+1.36
Conservative hold		Swing		

General election October 1974: Chippenham
Party	Candidate	Votes	%	±%
Conservative	Daniel Awdry	22,721	42.57	
Liberal	Ronald EJ Banks	20,972	39.30	
Labour Co-op	John Whiles	9,396	17.61	
United Democrat	EJ John	278	0.52	New
Majority		1,749	3.27	
Turnout		53,089	78.65	
Conservative hold		Swing		

General election February 1974: Chippenham
Party	Candidate	Votes	%	±%
Conservative	Daniel Awdry	24,645	44.33	
Liberal	Ronald EJ Banks	21,553	38.77	
Labour	John Whiles	9,395	16.90	
Majority		3,092	5.56	
Turnout		55,593	82.64	
Conservative hold		Swing		

General election 1970: Chippenham
Party	Candidate	Votes	%	±%
Conservative	Daniel Awdry	24,371	49.73	
Liberal	Margaret Wingfield	13,833	28.22	
Labour	John Eddie	10,807	22.05	
Majority		10,538	21.51	
Turnout		49,010	77.42	
Conservative hold		Swing		

=== Elections in the 1960s ===
General election 1966: Chippenham
Party	Candidate	Votes	%	±%
Conservative	Daniel Awdry	18,275	39.63	−0.82
Liberal	Christopher Walter Layton	17,581	38.13	+1.13
Labour	Giles Radice	10,257	22.24	−0.31
Majority		694	1.50	−1.95
Turnout		46,113	84.28	+3.13
Conservative hold		Swing	−0.98	

General election 1964: Chippenham
Party	Candidate	Votes	%	±%
Conservative	Daniel Awdry	18,089	40.45	+3.64
Liberal	Christopher Walter Layton	16,546	37.00	+4.54
Labour	Giles Radice	10,086	22.55	−6.58
Majority		1,543	3.45	−0.90
Turnout		44,721	81.15	
Conservative hold		Swing	−0.45	

1962 Chippenham by-election
Party	Candidate	Votes	%	±%
Conservative	Daniel Awdry	13,439	36.81	−15.26
Liberal	Christopher Walter Layton	11,851	32.46	+15.52
Labour	Robert W Portus	10,633	29.13	−1.86
Independent	K Jerrome	260	0.71	New
Independent	J Naylor	237	0.65	New
Independent	M Smith	88	0.24	New
Majority		1,588	4.35	−16.73
Turnout		36,508		
Conservative hold		Swing	−15.39	

=== Elections in the 1950s ===
General election 1959: Chippenham
Party	Candidate	Votes	%	±%
Conservative	David Eccles	21,696	52.07	
Labour	Robert W Portus	12,911	30.99	
Liberal	John Hall	7,059	16.94	
Majority		8,785	21.08	
Turnout		41,666	80.25	
Conservative hold		Swing		

General election 1955: Chippenham
Party	Candidate	Votes	%	±%
Conservative	David Eccles	20,847	51.73	
Labour	William J Smith	14,152	35.12	
Liberal	Arthur Rossi Braybrooke	5,298	13.15	New
Majority		6,695	16.61	
Turnout		40,297	80.15	
Conservative hold		Swing		

General election 1951: Chippenham
Party	Candidate	Votes	%	±%
Conservative	David Eccles	22,601	56.05	
Labour	Dengar R Evans	17,723	43.95	
Majority		4,878	12.10	
Turnout		40,324	81.43	
Conservative hold		Swing		

General election 1950: Chippenham
Party	Candidate	Votes	%	±%
Conservative	David Eccles	17,845	44.33	
Labour	Geoffrey Drain	13,748	34.15	
Liberal	Wilfred Greville Collins	8,661	21.52	
Majority		4,097	10.18	
Turnout		40,254	83.00	
Conservative hold		Swing		

=== Elections in the 1940s ===
General election 1945: Chippenham
Party	Candidate	Votes	%	±%
Conservative	David Eccles	15,889	42.6	−10.7
Labour	Andrew Tomlinson	11,866	31.8	+19.6
Liberal	Donald Johnson	9,547	25.6	−8.9
Majority		4,023	10.8	−8.0
Turnout		37,302	69.8	−7.7
Conservative hold		Swing	N/A	

1943 Chippenham by-election
Party	Candidate	Votes	%	±%
Conservative	David Eccles	8,310	50.6	−2.7
Independent Liberal	Donald Johnson	8,115	49.4	New
Majority		195	1.2	−17.6
Turnout		16,425	41.4	−36.1
Conservative hold		Swing		

=== Elections in the 1930s ===
General election 1935: Chippenham
Party	Candidate	Votes	%	±%
Conservative	Victor Cazalet	15,370	53.3	−3.5
Liberal	Arthur Stanton	9,949	34.5	−1.5
Labour	William Robert Robins	3,527	12.2	+5.0
Majority		5,421	18.8	−2.0
Turnout		28,846	77.5	−6.2
Conservative hold		Swing	+0.5	

General election 1931: Chippenham
Party	Candidate	Votes	%	±%
Conservative	Victor Cazalet	17,232	56.8	+10.2
Liberal	Seymour Howard	10,928	36.0	−4.6
Labour	William Robert Robins	2,194	7.2	−5.6
Majority		6,304	20.8	+14.8
Turnout		30,354	83.7	
Conservative hold		Swing	+7.4	

=== Elections in the 1920s ===
General election 1929: Chippenham
Party	Candidate	Votes	%	±%
Unionist	Victor Cazalet	13,550	46.6	−8.0
Liberal	Felix Brunner	11,819	40.6	+4.8
Labour	William Robert Robins	3,717	12.8	New
Majority		1,731	6.0	−3.2
Turnout		29,086		
Unionist hold		Swing	−6.2	

General election 1924: Chippenham
Party	Candidate	Votes	%	±%
Unionist	Victor Cazalet	13,227	54.6	+6.3
Liberal	Alfred Bonwick	11,015	45.4	−6.3
Majority		2,212	9.2	N/A
Turnout		24,242	83.2	+1.6
Unionist gain from Liberal		Swing	+6.3	

General election 1923: Chippenham
Party	Candidate	Votes	%	±%
Liberal	Alfred Bonwick	11,953	51.7	+3.1
Unionist	Victor Cazalet	11,156	48.3	+2.0
Majority		797	3.4	+1.1
Turnout		23,109	81.6	+3.6
Liberal hold		Swing	+0.6	

General election 1922: Chippenham
Party	Candidate	Votes	%	±%
Liberal	Alfred Bonwick	10,494	48.6	+19.4
Unionist	George Terrell	10,006	46.3	−6.8
Labour	William Robert Roberts	1,098	5.1	−12.6
Majority		488	2.3	N/A
Turnout		21,598	78.0	+16.7
Liberal gain from Unionist		Swing	+13.1	

=== Elections in the 1910s ===
General election 1918: Chippenham
Party		Candidate	Votes	%	±%
C	Unionist	George Terrell	8,786	53.1	+3.0
	Liberal	Albert Bennett	4,839	29.2	−20.7
	Labour	Reuben George	2,939	17.7	New
Majority			3,947	23.9	+23.7
Turnout			16,564	61.3	−28.7
	Unionist hold		Swing	+11.9	
C indicates candidate endorsed by the coalition government.

A general election was expected to take place in 1914/15. The following were to be candidates;

- George Terrell (Unionist)
- Harold Gorst (Liberal)

General election December 1910: Chippenham
Party	Candidate	Votes	%	±%
Conservative	George Terrell	4,141	50.1	−1.6
Liberal	Bryan Freeman	4,117	49.9	+1.6
Majority		24	0.2	−3.2
Turnout		8,258	90.0	−2.9
Registered electors		9,175		
Conservative hold		Swing	−1.6	

A petition was lodged in relation to the December 1910 election, but this was later withdrawn after a recount, resulting in the above numbers. The original count had placed the Conservatives with 4,139 votes and the Liberals with 4,113 votes.

General election January 1910: Chippenham
Party	Candidate	Votes	%	±%
Conservative	George Terrell	4,408	51.7	+14.1
Liberal	Cecil Beck	4,120	48.3	−14.1
Majority		288	3.4	N/A
Turnout		8,528	92.9	+3.4
Registered electors		9,175		
Conservative gain from Liberal		Swing	+14.1	

=== Elections in the 1900s ===
General election 1906: Chippenham
Party	Candidate	Votes	%	±%
Liberal	John Dickson-Poynder	4,937	62.4	+16.5
Conservative	J. R. Randolph	2,971	37.6	−16.5
Majority		1,966	24.8	N/A
Turnout		7,908	89.5	+5.0
Registered electors		8,838		
Liberal gain from Conservative		Swing	+16.5	

General election 1900: Chippenham
Party	Candidate	Votes	%	±%
Conservative	John Dickson-Poynder	3,863	54.1	+0.6
Liberal	J. Thornton	3,278	45.9	−0.6
Majority		585	8.2	+1.2
Turnout		7,141	84.5	−3.4
Registered electors		8,446		
Conservative hold		Swing	+0.6	

=== Elections in the 1890s ===
General election 1895: Chippenham
Party	Candidate	Votes	%	±%
Conservative	John Dickson-Poynder	3,898	53.5	+1.9
Liberal	J. Thornton	3,390	46.5	−1.9
Majority		508	7.0	+3.8
Turnout		7,288	87.9	+9.4
Registered electors		8,291		
Conservative hold		Swing	+1.9	

General election 1892: Chippenham
Party	Candidate	Votes	%	±%
Conservative	John Dickson-Poynder	3,684	51.6	−2.4
Liberal	John Fuller	3,455	48.4	+2.4
Majority		229	3.2	−4.8
Turnout		7,139	78.5	+1.9
Registered electors		9,089		
Conservative hold		Swing	−2.4	

=== Elections in the 1880s ===
General election 1886: Chippenham
Party	Candidate	Votes	%	±%
Conservative	Henry Brudenell-Bruce	3,657	54.0	+6.1
Liberal	Banister Fletcher	3,120	46.0	−6.1
Majority		537	8.0	N/A
Turnout		6,777	76.6	−7.6
Registered electors		8,853		
Conservative gain from Liberal		Swing	+6.1	

General election 1885: Chippenham
Party	Candidate	Votes	%	±%
Liberal	Banister Fletcher	3,880	52.1	+3.3
Conservative	Arthur Somerset	3,574	47.9	−3.3
Majority		306	4.2	N/A
Turnout		7,454	84.2	−6.3
Registered electors		8,853		
Liberal gain from Conservative		Swing	+3.3	

General election 1880: Chippenham
Party	Candidate	Votes	%	±%
Conservative	Gabriel Goldney	478	51.2	−12.3
Liberal	Samuel Butler	455	48.8	+12.3
Majority		23	2.4	−24.6
Turnout		933	90.5	+5.3
Registered electors		1,031		
Conservative hold		Swing	−12.3	

=== Elections in the 1870s ===
General election 1874: Chippenham
Party	Candidate	Votes	%	±%
Conservative	Gabriel Goldney	530	63.5	+9.7
Liberal	Handel Cossham	304	36.5	−9.7
Majority		226	27.0	+19.4
Turnout		834	85.2	+5.3
Registered electors		979		
Conservative hold		Swing	+9.7	

=== Elections in the 1860s ===
General election 1868: Chippenham
Party	Candidate	Votes	%	±%
Conservative	Gabriel Goldney	418	53.8	−16.6
Liberal	George Young	359	46.2	+16.6
Majority		59	7.6	+2.6
Turnout		777	79.9	−16.1
Registered electors		972		
Conservative hold		Swing	−16.6	

Seat reduced to one member

General election 1865: Chippenham
Party	Candidate	Votes	%	±%
Conservative	John Neeld	208	35.8	N/A
Conservative	Gabriel Goldney	201	34.6	N/A
Liberal	William John Lysley	172	29.6	N/A
Majority		29	5.0	N/A
Turnout		377 (est)	96.0 (est)	N/A
Registered electors		392		
Conservative hold		Swing	N/A	
Conservative gain from Liberal		Swing	N/A	

=== Elections in the 1850s ===
General election 1859: Chippenham
Party	Candidate	Votes	%	±%
Conservative	Richard Penruddocke Long	Unopposed		
Liberal	William John Lysley	Unopposed		
Registered electors		387		
Conservative hold				
Liberal gain from Conservative				

General election 1857: Chippenham
Party	Candidate	Votes	%	±%
Conservative	Henry George Boldero	174	38.2	N/A
Conservative	Robert Parry Nisbet	150	32.9	N/A
Whig	William John Lysley	132	28.9	New
Majority		18	4.0	N/A
Turnout		294 (est)	88.0 (est)	N/A
Registered electors		334		
Conservative hold		Swing	N/A	
Conservative hold		Swing	N/A	

By-election, 9 April 1856: Chippenham
Party	Candidate	Votes	%	±%
Conservative	Robert Parry Nisbet	Unopposed		
Conservative hold				

- Caused by Neeld's death.

General election 1852: Chippenham
Party	Candidate	Votes	%	±%
Conservative	Henry George Boldero	Unopposed		
Conservative	Joseph Neeld	Unopposed		
Registered electors		300		
Conservative hold				
Conservative hold				

=== Elections in the 1840s ===
General election 1847: Chippenham
Party	Candidate	Votes	%	±%
Conservative	Henry George Boldero	Unopposed		
Conservative	Joseph Neeld	Unopposed		
Registered electors		303		
Conservative hold				
Conservative hold				

By-election, 14 September 1841: Chippenham
Party	Candidate	Votes	%	±%
Conservative	Henry George Boldero	Unopposed		
Conservative hold				

- Caused by Boldero's appointment as Clerk of the Ordnance

General election 1841: Chippenham
Party	Candidate	Votes	%	±%
Conservative	Joseph Neeld	165	42.4	N/A
Conservative	Henry George Boldero	128	32.9	N/A
Whig	William John Lysley	96	24.7	New
Majority		32	8.2	N/A
Turnout		228	85.4	N/A
Registered electors		267		
Conservative hold		Swing	N/A	
Conservative hold		Swing	N/A	

=== Elections in the 1830s ===
General election 1837: Chippenham
Party	Candidate	Votes	%	±%
Conservative	Joseph Neeld	Unopposed		
Conservative	Henry George Boldero	Unopposed		
Registered electors		239		
Conservative hold				
Conservative hold				

General election 1835: Chippenham
Party	Candidate	Votes	%	±%
Conservative	Joseph Neeld	Unopposed		
Conservative	Henry George Boldero	Unopposed		
Registered electors		217		
Conservative hold				
Conservative gain from Whig				

General election 1832: Chippenham
Party	Candidate	Votes	%	±%
Tory	Joseph Neeld	139	44.7	−35.3
Whig	Henry Fox Talbot	132	42.4	+32.4
Whig	John Thomas Mayne	40	12.9	+2.9
Majority		7	2.3	−8.5
Turnout		183	88.0	c. +8.2
Registered electors		208		
Tory hold		Swing	−35.3	
Whig gain from Tory		Swing	+25.0	

General election 1831: Chippenham
Party	Candidate	Votes	%	±%
Tory	Joseph Neeld	96	49.2	−0.8
Tory	Henry George Boldero	60	30.8	−7.4
Whig	Henry Fox Talbot	39	20.0	New
Majority		21	10.8	−15.6
Turnout		103	c. 79.8	c. +20.1
Registered electors		c. 129		
Tory hold		Swing	N/A	
Tory hold		Swing	N/A	

General election 1830: Chippenham
Party	Candidate	Votes	%	±%
Tory	Joseph Neeld	76	50.0	
Tory	Philip Pusey	58	38.2	
No label	John George Henry Pownall	18	11.8	
Majority		40	26.4	
Turnout		77	c. 59.7	
Registered electors		c. 129		
Tory hold		Swing		
Tory hold		Swing		

== See also ==
- List of parliamentary constituencies in Wiltshire

== Sources ==
- Boundaries of Parliamentary Constituencies 1885–1972, compiled and edited by F.W.S. Craig (Parliamentary Reference Publications 1972)
- British Parliamentary Election Results 1832–1885, compiled and edited by F.W.S. Craig (Macmillan Press 1977)
- British Parliamentary Election Results 1885–1918, compiled and edited by F.W.S. Craig (Macmillan Press 1974)
- British Parliamentary Election Results 1918–1949, compiled and edited by F.W.S. Craig (Macmillan Press, revised edition 1977)
- British Parliamentary Election Results 1950–1973, compiled and edited by F.W.S. Craig (Parliamentary Research Services 1983)
- Who's Who of British Members of Parliament: Volume I 1832–1885, edited by M. Stenton (The Harvester Press 1976)
- Who's Who of British Members of Parliament, Volume II 1886–1918, edited by M. Stenton and S. Lees (Harvester Press 1978)
- Who's Who of British Members of Parliament, Volume III 1919–1945, edited by M. Stenton and S. Lees (Harvester Press 1979)
- Who's Who of British Members of Parliament, Volume IV 1945–1979, edited by M. Stenton and S. Lees (Harvester Press 1981)
- Robert Beatson, A Chronological Register of Both Houses of Parliament (London: Longman, Hurst, Res & Orme, 1807)
- D Brunton & D H Pennington, Members of the Long Parliament (London: George Allen & Unwin, 1954)
- Cobbett's Parliamentary history of England, from the Norman Conquest in 1066 to the year 1803 (London: Thomas Hansard, 1808)
- J Holladay Philbin, Parliamentary Representation 1832 – England and Wales (New Haven: Yale University Press, 1965)
- Frederic A Youngs Jr, Guide to the Local Administrative Units of England, Vol I (London: Royal Historical Society, 1979)
