= Henry Boldero =

English cleric and cricketer

Personal information
- Born: 31 March 1831; Weymouth, Dorset
- Died: 18 February 1900 (aged 68); Bath, Somerset
- Source: Cricinfo, 10 April 2017

Henry Kearney Boldero (31 March 1831 – 18 February 1900) was an English cleric and cricketer.

He was the second son of Henry George Boldero, and was educated at Harrow School. He matriculated at Trinity College, Cambridge in 1850, graduating B.A. in 1854. He was ordained deacon in 1855, and priest in 1856. He became rector of Yatton Keynell in 1856, and of Grittleton in 1864, presented by Sir John Neeld, 1st Baronet; Neeld was the brother of Henry George Boldero's second wife Mary Elizabeth Neeld.

Boldero played thirteen first-class matches for Cambridge University Cricket Club between 1851 and 1853.

== See also ==
- List of Cambridge University Cricket Club players
