= 1962 Chippenham by-election =

UK Parliamentary by-election

A by-election was held for the British House of Commons constituency of Chippenham, Wiltshire, England, on 22 November 1962.

Jerrome, Naylor and Smith were all serving in the Armed Forces, and stood to avail of the automatic military discharge for Parliamentary candidates publicised by Malcolm Thompson at the Middlesbrough West by-election the previous July.

The election was won by the Conservative Party candidate, Daniel Awdry, who won a narrow majority over the Liberal Party's then Economic Spokesperson, Christopher Layton.

Chippenham by-election, 1962
Party	Candidate	Votes	%	±%
Conservative	Daniel Awdry	13,439	36.8	−15.3
Liberal	Christopher Layton	11,851	32.5	+15.6
Labour	Robert W. Portus	10,633	29.1	−1.9
Independent	K. Jerrome	260	0.71	New
Independent	J. Naylor	237	0.65	New
Independent	M. Smith	88	0.24	New
Majority		1,588	4.3	−16.8
Turnout		36,508		
Conservative hold		Swing	−15.5	

== See also ==
- 1943 Chippenham by-election
- Chippenham (UK Parliament constituency)
- List of United Kingdom by-elections
