= William Neville (by 1532–1559 or later) =

16th-century English politician

William Neville (by 1532–1559 or later) was an English politician.

He was a member (MP) of the Parliament of England for Chippenham in 1558.
