= John Scott (died 1619) =

John Scott (before 1534-1619), of Chippenham, Wiltshire, was an English clothier and Member of Parliament (MP).

He was a Member of the Parliament of England for Chippenham in 1571 and 1572.
