= Robert Hyde (died 1642) =

English politician

Robert Hyde (c. 1562 – 1642) was an English politician.

He was a member (MP) of the parliament of England for Chippenham in 1584 and 1586, and for Great Bedwyn in 1614.
