= Henry George Boldero =

British Army officer and politician (1794–1873)

Henry George Boldero (1794–1873) was a British Army officer and a Tory Member of Parliament for Chippenham.

The second son of the Rev. John Boldero (died 1796), rector of Ampton, Suffolk, by his marriage to Mary Ann Sibbs of Blakeney, Norfolk, Boldero was educated at the Royal Military College, Sandhurst. He was commissioned into the Royal Engineers as a cornet in 1814, was promoted lieutenant in 1815, and captain in 1827. In 1830, he joined the 10th (North Lincolnshire) Regiment of Foot as a captain.

Boldero was first elected as one of the two Members of Parliament for Chippenham in 1831. He lost the election of 1832 to William Fox Talbot, but was elected again in 1835, holding the seat until he stood down in 1859. From 1841 to 1845, he was Clerk to the Ordnance. On 15 July 1842, he fought a duel with Craven Berkeley. He retired from the army with the rank of lieutenant colonel in 1851. He lived at Hurst Grove at Hurst in Berkshire.

Henry married Mary Elizabeth Neeld at All Saints, Southampton on 30 April 1828. Boldero was the father of Lieutenant General George Neeld Boldero (1829-1898), and Henry Kearney Boldero.
