= Listed buildings in Devizes =

Buildings in Devizes, Wiltshire, England

Devizes is a town and civil parish in Wiltshire, England. It contains 349 listed buildings that are recorded in the National Heritage List for England. Of these six are grade I, 43 are grade II* and 300 are grade II.

This list is based on the information retrieved online from Historic England.

== Key ==
Grade	Criteria
I	Buildings that are of exceptional interest
II*	Particularly important buildings of more than special interest
II	Buildings that are of special interest

== Listing ==
Name	Grade	Location	Type	Completed (Note: The date given is the date used by Historic England as significant for the initial building or that of an important part in the structure's description.)	Date designated	Grid ref. (Note: The grid reference is based on the British national grid reference system, sometimes known as OSGB36, used by the Ordnance Survey.) Geo-coordinates	Notes	Entry number (Note: The "List Entry Number" is a unique number assigned to each listed building and scheduled monument by Historic England.)	Image	Wikidata
Devizes Castle Including Glass House and Garden Walls Encircling West Side of Mound	I		castle		19 September 1972	SU0024961342; 51°21′04″N 1°59′52″W		1249366	Devizes Castle Including Glass House and Garden Walls Encircling West Side of Mound More images	Q5267588
Devizes and Roundway War Memorial with Associated Railings	II		war memorial		15 November 2013	SU0052261232; 51°21′01″N 1°59′38″W		1417316	Devizes and Roundway War Memorial with Associated Railings More images	Q26676574
Gate House of Devizes Castle	II				19 September 1972	SU0032861361; 51°21′05″N 1°59′48″W		1249360	Upload Photo	Q26541501
London Road Bridge	II				9 April 1954	SU0118561690; 51°21′15″N 1°59′04″W		1263775	Upload Photo	Q26554543
Milestone by Entrance to Old Barracks	II	A361			29 April 1987	SU0258263484; 51°22′13″N 1°57′51″W		1033731	Upload Photo	Q26285222
Park Bridge	II				9 April 1954	SU0062861789; 51°21′19″N 1°59′33″W		1249363	Upload Photo	Q26541503
Remains of Original Castle	II				19 September 1972	SU0022361305; 51°21′03″N 1°59′53″W		1249362	Upload Photo	Q26541502
Walls Encircling Top of Castle Mound	II				19 September 1972	SU0020361284; 51°21′02″N 1°59′54″W		1263774	Upload Photo	Q26554542
Wharf Bridge	II				9 April 1954	SU0050161813; 51°21′19″N 1°59′39″W		1263776	Upload Photo	Q26554544
Sidmouth Street (see Details for Further Address Information)	II	1, Albion Place			9 April 1954	SU0071261419; 51°21′07″N 1°59′28″W		1252374	Upload Photo	Q26544248
Sidmouth Street (see Details for Further Address Information)	II	2 and 3, Albion Place			9 April 1954	SU0069961407; 51°21′06″N 1°59′29″W		1262290	Upload Photo	Q26682186
Bridge House Durleston	II	Bath Road			14 December 1971	ST9934561548; 51°21′11″N 2°00′39″W		1249415	Upload Photo	Q26541550
Church of St Peter	II	Bath Road	church building		9 April 1954	ST9967961648; 51°21′14″N 2°00′22″W		1263777	Church of St Peter More images	Q7595235
Lyecroft	II	Bath Road			30 July 1998	ST9918461472; 51°21′08″N 2°00′47″W		1375974	Upload Photo	Q26656665
Prison Bridge	II	Bath Road			19 September 1972	ST9935161519; 51°21′10″N 2°00′39″W		1249416	Upload Photo	Q26541551
Shane's Castle	II	Bath Road	castle		14 December 1971	ST9975061716; 51°21′16″N 2°00′18″W		1249414	Shane's Castle More images	Q26541549
St Peter's Church War Memorial, Devizes	II	Bath Road, SN10 2AP			29 January 2018	ST9967861664; 51°21′15″N 2°00′22″W		1452122	Upload Photo	Q66479241
The Cedars	II*	Bath Road			9 April 1954	ST9982561772; 51°21′18″N 2°00′14″W		1263761	Upload Photo	Q17544282
The Red House	II	Bath Road			9 April 1954	ST9987161730; 51°21′17″N 2°00′12″W		1249364	Upload Photo	Q26541504
Bellevue Cottage	II	Bellevue Road			19 September 1972	ST9998261856; 51°21′21″N 2°00′06″W		1249418	Upload Photo	Q26541553
Girls Hostel	II	Bellevue Road			19 September 1972	ST9995861853; 51°21′21″N 2°00′07″W		1249417	Upload Photo	Q26541552
1-8, Bridewell Street	II	1-8, Bridewell Street			19 September 1972	SU0062561174; 51°20′59″N 1°59′33″W		1249419	Upload Photo	Q26541554
Nos 9a, 9b and 10, Bridewell Street	II	9a, 9b and 10, Bridewell Street, SN10 1NQ			19 September 1972	SU0063461184; 51°20′59″N 1°59′32″W		1263762	Upload Photo	Q26554531
11, 11a and 12, Bridewell Street	II	11, 11a and 12, Bridewell Street			19 September 1972	SU0063961191; 51°20′59″N 1°59′32″W		1263763	Upload Photo	Q26554532
13, Bridewell Street	II	13, Bridewell Street			19 September 1972	SU0064861222; 51°21′00″N 1°59′31″W		1263737	Upload Photo	Q26554507
23, Bridewell Street	II	23, Bridewell Street			19 September 1972	SU0067161206; 51°21′00″N 1°59′30″W		1249423	Upload Photo	Q26541557
24-26, Bridewell Street	II	24-26, Bridewell Street			19 September 1972	SU0066361190; 51°20′59″N 1°59′31″W		1249424	Upload Photo	Q26541558
27, Bridewell Street	II	27, Bridewell Street			19 September 1972	SU0066161184; 51°20′59″N 1°59′31″W		1263764	Upload Photo	Q26554533
28, Bridewell Street	II	28, Bridewell Street			19 September 1972	SU0065561165; 51°20′58″N 1°59′31″W		1249425	Upload Photo	Q26541559
29-31, Bridewell Street	II	29-31, Bridewell Street			19 September 1972	SU0064661168; 51°20′59″N 1°59′32″W		1263742	Upload Photo	Q26554512
Blueitts	II	52, Church Walk			19 September 1972	SU0104461389; 51°21′06″N 1°59′11″W		1263747	Upload Photo	Q26554517
The Queen's Head Inn	II*	12-14, Dunkirk	inn		9 April 1954	ST9940861924; 51°21′23″N 2°00′36″W		1249469	The Queen's Head Inn More images	Q17543911
Dunkirk House	II	Dunkirk			9 April 1954	ST9945361842; 51°21′20″N 2°00′33″W		1263710	Upload Photo	Q26554482
Garden Wall to Dunkirk House	II	Dunkirk			19 September 1972	ST9942961842; 51°21′20″N 2°00′35″W		1249471	Upload Photo	Q26541602
Hillside	II	Dunkirk			19 September 1972	ST9945761835; 51°21′20″N 2°00′33″W		1263711	Upload Photo	Q26554483
1, Estcourt Street	II	1, Estcourt Street			19 September 1972	SU0077961472; 51°21′08″N 1°59′25″W		1249472	Upload Photo	Q26541603
2, 3, 4 and 4a, Estcourt Street	II	2, 3, 4 and 4a, Estcourt Street			9 April 1954	SU0078261469; 51°21′08″N 1°59′25″W		1263712	Upload Photo	Q26554484
5-7, Estcourt Street	II	5-7, Estcourt Street			9 April 1954	SU0081061464; 51°21′08″N 1°59′23″W		1249473	Upload Photo	Q26541604
British Lion Public House	II	10 and 11, Estcourt Street	pub		19 September 1972	SU0082861462; 51°21′08″N 1°59′22″W		1249474	British Lion Public House More images	Q26541605
Church of St James	II*	Estcourt Street	church building		9 April 1954	SU0108361517; 51°21′10″N 1°59′09″W		1263715	Church of St James More images	Q17544279
London Road Youth Centre	II	Estcourt Street			19 September 1972	SU0105261537; 51°21′10″N 1°59′11″W		1249476	Upload Photo	Q26541607
Manor Cottage	II	Estcourt Street			19 September 1972	SU0095461518; 51°21′10″N 1°59′16″W		1249475	Upload Photo	Q26541606
The Bell Inn	II	Estcourt Street	inn		19 September 1972	SU0089561483; 51°21′09″N 1°59′19″W		1263713	The Bell Inn More images	Q26554485
Roundway Farmhouse	II	Folly Road			19 March 1962	SU0134563338; 51°22′09″N 1°58′55″W		1243311	Upload Photo	Q26535994
Roundway Hill Farmhouse	II	Folly Road			3 April 1987	SU0155863144; 51°22′02″N 1°58′44″W		1243310	Upload Photo	Q26535993
Swiss Cottage	II	Folly Road			3 April 1987	SU0062463296; 51°22′07″N 1°59′33″W		1272946	Upload Photo	Q26562743
The Malthouse	II	Folly Road			3 April 1987	SU0139663243; 51°22′06″N 1°58′53″W		1272945	Upload Photo	Q26562742
The Ovens	II	Folly Road			3 April 1987	SU0129663246; 51°22′06″N 1°58′58″W		1243312	Upload Photo	Q26535995
2 and 4, Hare and Hounds Street	II	2 and 4, Hare And Hounds Street			9 April 1954	SU0069861228; 51°21′00″N 1°59′29″W		1263555	Upload Photo	Q26554335
The Hare and Hounds Inn	II	6, Hare And Hounds Street			19 September 1972	SU0070861226; 51°21′00″N 1°59′28″W		1249799	The Hare and Hounds Inn More images	Q26541900
8, Hare and Hounds Street	II	8, Hare And Hounds Street			19 September 1972	SU0071861226; 51°21′00″N 1°59′28″W		1249800	Upload Photo	Q26541901
East Lodge of Old Park House	II	Hartmoor Road			19 September 1972	SU0000260478; 51°20′36″N 2°00′05″W		1249802	Upload Photo	Q26541903
Old Park House (annexe of Roundway Hospital)	II	Hartmoor Road			19 September 1972	ST9959360351; 51°20′32″N 2°00′26″W		1249801	Upload Photo	Q26541902
4-6, High Street	II	4-6, High Street			19 September 1972	SU0049261404; 51°21′06″N 1°59′40″W		1249803	Upload Photo	Q26541904
13, High Street	II	13, High Street			19 September 1972	SU0051461350; 51°21′04″N 1°59′38″W		1249804	13, High Street More images	Q26541905
15, High Street	II	15, High Street			9 April 1954	SU0049661338; 51°21′04″N 1°59′39″W		1249806	Upload Photo	Q26541906
16, High Street	II	16, High Street			19 September 1972	SU0049061361; 51°21′05″N 1°59′40″W		1263556	Upload Photo	Q26554336
17, High Street	II	17, High Street			9 April 1954	SU0048661373; 51°21′05″N 1°59′40″W		1249808	Upload Photo	Q26541908
18 and 19, High Street	II	18 and 19, High Street			9 April 1954	SU0048461380; 51°21′05″N 1°59′40″W		1249809	Upload Photo	Q26541909
20-22, High Street	II	20-22, High Street			9 April 1954	SU0047761398; 51°21′06″N 1°59′40″W		1249826	Upload Photo	Q26541925
23 High Street	II	23, High Street, SN10 1AT			28 March 1979	SU0046061407; 51°21′06″N 1°59′41″W		1262286	Upload Photo	Q26553172
24, High Street	II	24, High Street			9 April 1954	SU0046261415; 51°21′07″N 1°59′41″W		1263566	Upload Photo	Q26554346
Greystone House	II*	High Street	house		9 April 1954	SU0052761343; 51°21′04″N 1°59′38″W		1249805	Greystone House More images	Q17543916
Hillworth Cottages	II	1 and 2, Hillworth Road			19 September 1972	SU0059261057; 51°20′55″N 1°59′34″W		1263557	Upload Photo	Q26554337
Garden Pavilion to the South East of Hillworth House	II*	Hillworth Road			9 April 1954	SU0046160913; 51°20′50″N 1°59′41″W		1249833	Upload Photo	Q17543920
Highsett Rowans	II	Hillworth Road			9 April 1954	SU0049361007; 51°20′53″N 1°59′40″W		1263558	Upload Photo	Q26554338
Hillworth House	II	Hillworth Road			19 September 1972	SU0041360983; 51°20′53″N 1°59′44″W		1249812	Upload Photo	Q26541912
Wayside Cottage	II	Hillworth Road			19 September 1972	SU0052261071; 51°20′55″N 1°59′38″W		1249834	Upload Photo	Q26541932
Brickham Bridge, at Su 015 621	II	At Su 015 621, Kennet And Avon Canal			15 November 1990	SU0150062091; 51°21′28″N 1°58′47″W		1244050	Upload Photo	Q26536695
Kennet and Avon Canal, Kennet Lock, Immediately North of Town Bridge, the Nursery	II	Kennet Lock, Immediately North Of Town Bridge, The Nursery, Kennet And Avon Canal			15 November 1990	SU0005161715; 51°21′16″N 2°00′02″W		1252431	Upload Photo	Q26544298
Morris Lane (see Details for Further Address Information)	II*	1-4, Lansdowne Grove			9 April 1954	SU0064761266; 51°21′02″N 1°59′32″W		1250952	Upload Photo	Q17543968
1 and 2, Lansdowne Road	II	1 and 2, Lansdowne Road			19 September 1972	SU0066861261; 51°21′02″N 1°59′30″W		1249839	Upload Photo	Q26541937
Morris Lane (see Details for Further Address Information)	II	1-4, Lansdowne Terrace			9 April 1954	SU0064061245; 51°21′01″N 1°59′32″W		1250953	Upload Photo	Q26542960
1, Little Brittox	II	1, Little Brittox			19 September 1972	SU0046161475; 51°21′08″N 1°59′41″W		1249840	Upload Photo	Q26541938
2 and 3, Little Brittox	II	2 and 3, Little Brittox			19 September 1972	SU0046461467; 51°21′08″N 1°59′41″W		1263535	Upload Photo	Q26554318
7-9, Little Brittox	II	7-9, Little Brittox			19 September 1972	SU0045361450; 51°21′08″N 1°59′42″W		1249841	Upload Photo	Q26541939
10, Little Brittox	II	10, Little Brittox			19 September 1972	SU0045061458; 51°21′08″N 1°59′42″W		1263536	Upload Photo	Q26554319
Bedborough Cottage	II	London Road			3 April 1987	SU0189062620; 51°21′46″N 1°58′27″W		1243339	Upload Photo	Q26536022
Marlborough Lodge and Gate Piers	II	London Road			27 June 1973	SU0146262185; 51°21′31″N 1°58′49″W		1243313	Upload Photo	Q26535996
The Vicarage	II	London Road			19 September 1972	SU0109461609; 51°21′13″N 1°59′08″W		1249842	Upload Photo	Q26541940
The White House	II	London Road			3 April 1987	SU0172762421; 51°21′39″N 1°58′36″W		1272947	Upload Photo	Q26562744
2 and 3, Long Street	II	2 and 3, Long Street			19 September 1972	SU0052361305; 51°21′03″N 1°59′38″W		1249843	Upload Photo	Q26541941
8, Long Street	II*	8, Long Street			9 April 1954	SU0053261273; 51°21′02″N 1°59′37″W		1249844	Upload Photo	Q17543923
9, Long Street	II*	9, Long Street			9 April 1954	SU0053661261; 51°21′02″N 1°59′37″W		1263544	Upload Photo	Q17544263
10, Long Street	II*	10, Long Street	building		9 April 1954	SU0053961253; 51°21′01″N 1°59′37″W		1249845	10, Long Street More images	Q17543927
11, Long Street	II*	11, Long Street	building		9 April 1954	SU0054661242; 51°21′01″N 1°59′37″W		1249860	11, Long Street More images	Q17543941
12, Long Street	II	12, Long Street			19 September 1972	SU0055061230; 51°21′01″N 1°59′37″W		1249871	Upload Photo	Q26541964
12a, 13 and 14, Long Street	II	12a, 13 and 14, Long Street			19 September 1972	SU0056561214; 51°21′00″N 1°59′36″W		1249846	Upload Photo	Q26541942
15-17, Long Street	II	15-17, Long Street			9 April 1954	SU0057261203; 51°21′00″N 1°59′35″W		1249861	Upload Photo	Q26541955
18, Long Street	II*	18, Long Street			9 April 1954	SU0057661192; 51°20′59″N 1°59′35″W		1249848	Upload Photo	Q17543937
19-21, Long Street	II	19-21, Long Street			9 April 1954	SU0058061188; 51°20′59″N 1°59′35″W		1249866	Upload Photo	Q26541960
22-25, Long Street	II	22-25, Long Street			9 April 1954	SU0059861156; 51°20′58″N 1°59′34″W		1249849	Upload Photo	Q26541944
26, Long Street (see Details for Further Address Information)	II	26, Long Street			19 September 1972	SU0060661138; 51°20′58″N 1°59′34″W		1249868	Upload Photo	Q26541962
27, Long Street	II*	27, Long Street			9 April 1954	SU0061061116; 51°20′57″N 1°59′33″W		1249869	Upload Photo	Q17543944
28 and 29, Long Street	II	28 and 29, Long Street			9 April 1954	SU0061261105; 51°20′56″N 1°59′33″W		1249872	Upload Photo	Q26541965
Conservative Club	II*	30, Long Street	clubhouse		9 April 1954	SU0064061112; 51°20′57″N 1°59′32″W		1263548	Conservative Club More images	Q17544267
31 and 32, Long Street	II	31 and 32, Long Street			9 April 1954	SU0059361077; 51°20′56″N 1°59′34″W		1249874	Upload Photo	Q26541967
33 and 33a, Long Street	II*	33 and 33a, Long Street			9 April 1954	SU0058961097; 51°20′56″N 1°59′35″W		1263549	Upload Photo	Q17544274
34, Long Street	II	34, Long Street			9 April 1954	SU0058561110; 51°20′57″N 1°59′35″W		1263515	Upload Photo	Q26554301
35, 35a and 36, Long Street	II*	35, 35a and 36, Long Street			9 April 1954	SU0058261117; 51°20′57″N 1°59′35″W		1263516	Upload Photo	Q17544260
37, Long Street	II	37, Long Street			9 April 1954	SU0057461130; 51°20′57″N 1°59′35″W		1249882	Upload Photo	Q26541975
Rectory	II	39, Long Street			9 April 1954	SU0055661169; 51°20′59″N 1°59′36″W		1249877	Upload Photo	Q26541970
Part of Museum	II	40, Long Street			9 April 1954	SU0054961191; 51°20′59″N 1°59′37″W		1263316	Upload Photo	Q26682256
Part of Museum	II	41, Long Street			9 April 1954	SU0054361200; 51°21′00″N 1°59′37″W		1250354	Upload Photo	Q26542408
42, Long Street	II	42, Long Street			19 September 1972	SU0053561214; 51°21′00″N 1°59′37″W		1263317	Upload Photo	Q26554113
43 and 44, Long Street	II	43 and 44, Long Street			9 April 1954	SU0051861252; 51°21′01″N 1°59′38″W		1263318	Upload Photo	Q26554114
45 and 46, Long Street	II	45 and 46, Long Street			19 September 1972	SU0051361265; 51°21′02″N 1°59′38″W		1250357	Upload Photo	Q26542410
47, Long Street	II	47, Long Street			19 September 1972	SU0051061272; 51°21′02″N 1°59′39″W		1250358	Upload Photo	Q26542411
48 and 49, Long Street	II	48 and 49, Long Street			19 September 1972	SU0050261286; 51°21′02″N 1°59′39″W		1263319	Upload Photo	Q26554115
50 and 50a, Long Street	II	50 and 50a, Long Street			9 April 1954	SU0049861296; 51°21′03″N 1°59′39″W		1250359	Upload Photo	Q26542412
51 and 52, Long Street	II	51 and 52, Long Street			19 September 1972	SU0049361306; 51°21′03″N 1°59′40″W		1263320	Upload Photo	Q26554116
26a, Long Street	II	26a, Long Street			9 April 1954	SU0060561126; 51°20′57″N 1°59′34″W		1249850	Upload Photo	Q26541945
Coach House and Garden Wall (part of Number 1 Hillworth Road) Coach House and Garden Wall of Number 1 (hillworth Cottages)	II	Long Street			19 September 1972	SU0062960999; 51°20′53″N 1°59′32″W		1263567	Upload Photo	Q26554347
Eastcroft House	II	Long Street			9 April 1954	SU0054761142; 51°20′58″N 1°59′37″W		1249876	Upload Photo	Q26541969
Gate and Railings at Entrance to St John's Churchyard	II	Long Street			19 September 1972	SU0052661245; 51°21′01″N 1°59′38″W		1250356	Upload Photo	Q26542409
The Ark	II*	Long Street			9 April 1954	SU0047061191; 51°20′59″N 1°59′41″W		1250355	Upload Photo	Q17543946
The Elm Tree Inn	II	Long Street			9 April 1954	SU0052161321; 51°21′03″N 1°59′38″W		1263537	The Elm Tree Inn More images	Q26554320
4 and 5, Market Place	II	4 and 5, Market Place			9 April 1954	SU0034361486; 51°21′09″N 1°59′47″W		1250365	Upload Photo	Q26542416
8, Market Place	II	8, Market Place			19 September 1972	SU0034261504; 51°21′09″N 1°59′47″W		1250367	Upload Photo	Q26542418
Pelican Inn	II	9, Market Place	pub		9 April 1954	SU0033761512; 51°21′10″N 1°59′48″W		1250368	Pelican Inn More images	Q26542419
10, Market Place	II	10, Market Place			19 September 1972	SU0033261519; 51°21′10″N 1°59′48″W		1263282	Upload Photo	Q26554079
11, Market Place	II	11, Market Place			19 September 1972	SU0032661521; 51°21′10″N 1°59′48″W		1250369	Upload Photo	Q26542420
12, Market Place	II	12, Market Place			19 September 1972	SU0032261527; 51°21′10″N 1°59′48″W		1250419	Upload Photo	Q26542467
13, Market Place	II	13, Market Place			9 April 1954	SU0030861522; 51°21′10″N 1°59′49″W		1250420	Upload Photo	Q26542468
14, Market Place	II	14, Market Place			19 September 1972	SU0031261539; 51°21′11″N 1°59′49″W		1263271	Upload Photo	Q26554071
15, Market Place	II	15, Market Place			19 September 1972	SU0031161546; 51°21′11″N 1°59′49″W		1250421	Upload Photo	Q26542469
16, Market Place	II*	16, Market Place			9 April 1954	SU0029561540; 51°21′11″N 1°59′50″W		1250422	Upload Photo	Q17543952
17, Market Place	I	17, Market Place			9 April 1954	SU0029561553; 51°21′11″N 1°59′50″W		1250423	Upload Photo	Q17529723
18, Market Place	II	18, Market Place			19 September 1972	SU0030761584; 51°21′12″N 1°59′49″W		1250424	Upload Photo	Q26542470
21 and 22, Market Place	II	21 and 22, Market Place			19 September 1972	SU0032661574; 51°21′12″N 1°59′48″W		1250832	Upload Photo	Q26542854
Parnella House	II*	23, Market Place	house		9 April 1954	SU0033861579; 51°21′12″N 1°59′48″W		1250833	Parnella House More images	Q17543958
The Pie Shop	II	24, Market Place			19 September 1972	SU0034761580; 51°21′12″N 1°59′47″W		1250834	Upload Photo	Q26542855
29, Market Place	II	29, Market Place			19 September 1972	SU0038461552; 51°21′11″N 1°59′45″W		1250835	Upload Photo	Q26542856
30, Market Place	II	30, Market Place			19 September 1972	SU0038961548; 51°21′11″N 1°59′45″W		1250836	Upload Photo	Q26542857
31, Market Place	II	31, Market Place			19 September 1972	SU0039961545; 51°21′11″N 1°59′44″W		1263052	Upload Photo	Q26553870
32, Market Place	II	32, Market Place			19 September 1972	SU0041361544; 51°21′11″N 1°59′44″W		1263053	Upload Photo	Q26553871
33 and 34, Market Place	II	33 and 34, Market Place			19 September 1972	SU0041761540; 51°21′11″N 1°59′43″W		1250838	Upload Photo	Q26542859
Strong's Restaurant	II	35, Market Place			19 September 1972	SU0042961537; 51°21′10″N 1°59′43″W		1250839	Upload Photo	Q26542860
36 and 37, Market Place	II	36 and 37, Market Place			19 September 1972	SU0043161520; 51°21′10″N 1°59′43″W		1263054	Upload Photo	Q26553872
Lloyds Bank	II	38 and 39, Market Place			19 September 1972	SU0044061522; 51°21′10″N 1°59′42″W		1263055	Upload Photo	Q26553873
40, Market Place	II	40, Market Place			9 April 1954	SU0044561509; 51°21′10″N 1°59′42″W		1263056	Upload Photo	Q26553874
41, Market Place	II	41, Market Place			9 April 1954	SU0044861502; 51°21′09″N 1°59′42″W		1250840	Upload Photo	Q26542861
42, Market Place	II	42, Market Place			19 September 1972	SU0045361492; 51°21′09″N 1°59′42″W		1250841	Upload Photo	Q26542862
43 and 44, Market Place	II	43 and 44, Market Place			19 September 1972	SU0044661465; 51°21′08″N 1°59′42″W		1263067	Upload Photo	Q26553885
Gate Piers and Offsets of Number 16	II	Market Place			19 September 1972	SU0031061551; 51°21′11″N 1°59′49″W		1263272	Upload Photo	Q26554072
Market Hall	II	Market Place			19 September 1972	SU0045761488; 51°21′09″N 1°59′41″W		1263057	Upload Photo	Q26553875
National Westminster Old Bank Part of the National Westminster Old Bank	II*	Market Place			9 April 1954	SU0040561433; 51°21′07″N 1°59′44″W		1263031	Upload Photo	Q17544247
The Bear Hotel	II*	Market Place	hotel		9 April 1954	SU0035861448; 51°21′08″N 1°59′46″W		1250363	The Bear Hotel More images	Q17543949
The Black Swan Inn	II*	Market Place	hotel		9 April 1954	SU0034961565; 51°21′11″N 1°59′47″W		1263051	The Black Swan Inn More images	Q4921966
The Corn Exchange	II	Market Place	corn exchange		9 April 1954	SU0034261456; 51°21′08″N 1°59′47″W		1250364	The Corn Exchange More images	Q26542415
The Fountain	II	Market Place			9 April 1954	SU0038661516; 51°21′10″N 1°59′45″W		1250361	Upload Photo	Q26542414
The Market Cross	II*	Market Place	market cross		9 April 1954	SU0040661486; 51°21′09″N 1°59′44″W		1250362	The Market Cross More images	Q17543948
The New Market Tavern	II	Market Place			9 April 1954	SU0034961501; 51°21′09″N 1°59′47″W		1250366	Upload Photo	Q26542417
35, Monday Market Street (see Details for Further Address Information)	II	1, Maryport Street			19 September 1972	SU0059061498; 51°21′09″N 1°59′34″W		1250843	Upload Photo	Q26542864
2, Maryport Street	II	2, Maryport Street			19 September 1972	SU0059461493; 51°21′09″N 1°59′34″W		1263033	Upload Photo	Q26553854
3 and 4, Maryport Street	II	3 and 4, Maryport Street			19 September 1972	SU0060161484; 51°21′09″N 1°59′34″W		1250876	Upload Photo	Q26542892
Oddfellows Hall	II	5, Maryport Street			19 September 1972	SU0060861479; 51°21′09″N 1°59′34″W		1263034	Upload Photo	Q26553855
6 and 7, Maryport Street	II	6 and 7, Maryport Street			19 September 1972	SU0061361472; 51°21′08″N 1°59′33″W		1250877	Upload Photo	Q26542893
8, Maryport Street	II	8, Maryport Street			19 September 1972	SU0061861470; 51°21′08″N 1°59′33″W		1250878	Upload Photo	Q26542894
9 and 10, Maryport Street	II	9 and 10, Maryport Street			19 September 1972	SU0062261465; 51°21′08″N 1°59′33″W		1263035	Upload Photo	Q26553856
11 and 11a, Maryport Street	II	11 and 11a, Maryport Street			19 September 1972	SU0062961460; 51°21′08″N 1°59′32″W		1250879	Upload Photo	Q26542895
12 13, Maryport Street	II	12 13, Maryport Street			19 September 1972	SU0063761448; 51°21′08″N 1°59′32″W		1263036	Upload Photo	Q26553857
14 and 15, Maryport Street	II	14 and 15, Maryport Street			19 September 1972	SU0064161440; 51°21′07″N 1°59′32″W		1250880	Upload Photo	Q26542896
16, Maryport Street	II	16, Maryport Street			19 September 1972	SU0065161434; 51°21′07″N 1°59′31″W		1250881	Upload Photo	Q26542897
Three Crowns Inn	II	26, Maryport Street	inn		9 April 1954	SU0060761443; 51°21′07″N 1°59′34″W		1263037	Three Crowns Inn More images	Q26553858
27 and 28, Maryport Street	II	27 and 28, Maryport Street			19 September 1972	SU0059961454; 51°21′08″N 1°59′34″W		1250882	Upload Photo	Q26542898
29 and 30, Maryport Street	II	29 and 30, Maryport Street			19 September 1972	SU0059361462; 51°21′08″N 1°59′34″W		1250883	Upload Photo	Q26542899
31, Maryport Street	II	31, Maryport Street			19 September 1972	SU0058961469; 51°21′08″N 1°59′35″W		1263039	Upload Photo	Q26553860
32 and 33, Maryport Street	II	32 and 33, Maryport Street			19 September 1972	SU0058161475; 51°21′08″N 1°59′35″W		1250884	Upload Photo	Q26542900
Great Porch House	II*	6 and 7, Monday Market Street	house		9 April 1954	SU0062161523; 51°21′10″N 1°59′33″W		1250885	Great Porch House More images	Q17543966
9, Monday Market Street	II	9, Monday Market Street			12 June 1970	SU0062861513; 51°21′10″N 1°59′33″W		1263040	Upload Photo	Q26553861
10-12, Monday Market Street	II	10-12, Monday Market Street			12 June 1970	SU0063261505; 51°21′09″N 1°59′32″W		1250886	Upload Photo	Q26542901
13, Monday Market Street	II	13, Monday Market Street			9 April 1954	SU0063961497; 51°21′09″N 1°59′32″W		1263041	Upload Photo	Q26553862
14, Monday Market Street	II	14, Monday Market Street			12 June 1970	SU0064261487; 51°21′09″N 1°59′32″W		1250887	Upload Photo	Q26542902
15, Monday Market Street	II	15, Monday Market Street			12 June 1970	SU0064561481; 51°21′09″N 1°59′32″W		1250950	Upload Photo	Q26542958
29 and 30, Monday Market Street	II	29 and 30, Monday Market Street			19 September 1972	SU0062361485; 51°21′09″N 1°59′33″W		1262992	Upload Photo	Q26553821
The White Bear Inn	II	34, Monday Market Street			9 April 1954	SU0059861506; 51°21′09″N 1°59′34″W		1250951	The White Bear Inn More images	Q26542959
St Mary's Cottages	II	1-3, New Park Road			19 September 1972	SU0058561652; 51°21′14″N 1°59′35″W		1250954	Upload Photo	Q26542961
32 and 33, New Park Street	II	32 and 33, New Park Street			19 September 1972	SU0040461688; 51°21′15″N 1°59′44″W		1250957	Upload Photo	Q26542964
34, New Park Street	II	34, New Park Street			19 September 1972	SU0041461685; 51°21′15″N 1°59′44″W		1250959	Upload Photo	Q26542966
35, New Park Street	II	35, New Park Street			19 September 1972	SU0042061682; 51°21′15″N 1°59′43″W		1251607	Upload Photo	Q26543552
36, 36a and 36b, New Park Street	II	36, 36a and 36b, New Park Street			19 September 1972	SU0042961679; 51°21′15″N 1°59′43″W		1262698	Upload Photo	Q26553558
37 and 37a, New Park Street	II	37 and 37a, New Park Street			19 September 1972	SU0044261676; 51°21′15″N 1°59′42″W		1251608	Upload Photo	Q26543553
39 and 39a, New Park Street	II	39 and 39a, New Park Street			9 April 1954	SU0046061667; 51°21′15″N 1°59′41″W		1262699	Upload Photo	Q26553559
Royal Oak Inn	II	43, New Park Street	inn		19 September 1972	SU0049761646; 51°21′14″N 1°59′39″W		1251609	Royal Oak Inn More images	Q26543554
44 and 45, New Park Street	II	44 and 45, New Park Street			19 September 1972	SU0051661631; 51°21′14″N 1°59′38″W		1251610	Upload Photo	Q26543555
46, New Park Street	II	46, New Park Street			19 September 1972	SU0052461626; 51°21′13″N 1°59′38″W		1251611	Upload Photo	Q26543556
Brownstone House	I	47, New Park Street	house		19 September 1972	SU0054761614; 51°21′13″N 1°59′37″W		1251612	Brownstone House More images	Q4976732
48, New Park Street	II	48, New Park Street			19 September 1972	SU0055561601; 51°21′13″N 1°59′36″W		1251631	Upload Photo	Q26543574
57 and 58, New Park Street	II	57 and 58, New Park Street			19 September 1972	SU0054161565; 51°21′11″N 1°59′37″W		1262646	Upload Photo	Q26553510
62 and 63, New Park Street	II	62 and 63, New Park Street			19 September 1972	SU0051461585; 51°21′12″N 1°59′38″W		1251617	Upload Photo	Q26543560
64, New Park Street	II	64, New Park Street			19 September 1972	SU0051361592; 51°21′12″N 1°59′38″W		1262647	Upload Photo	Q26553511
65, New Park Street	II	65, New Park Street			19 September 1972	SU0050761596; 51°21′12″N 1°59′39″W		1251618	Upload Photo	Q26543561
66, New Park Street	II	66, New Park Street			9 April 1954	SU0050061602; 51°21′13″N 1°59′39″W		1262700	Upload Photo	Q26553560
67, New Park Street	II	67, New Park Street			9 April 1954	SU0049261612; 51°21′13″N 1°59′40″W		1262650	Upload Photo	Q26553514
Castle Hotel	II	New Park Street	hotel		9 April 1954	SU0057561569; 51°21′12″N 1°59′35″W		1251616	Castle Hotel More images	Q26543559
Church of St Mary	I	New Park Street	church building		9 April 1954	SU0059861606; 51°21′13″N 1°59′34″W		1251640	Church of St Mary More images	Q17529757
Forecourt Wall of Brownstone House	I	New Park Street			19 September 1972	SU0053961604; 51°21′13″N 1°59′37″W		1251613	Upload Photo	Q17529752
Gates and Railings at Northerly Entrance to St Mary's Churchyard	II	New Park Street			19 September 1972	SU0055661585; 51°21′12″N 1°59′36″W		1251615	Upload Photo	Q26543558
Main Entrance Gates to St Mary's Churchyard	II	New Park Street			19 September 1972	SU0059661560; 51°21′11″N 1°59′34″W		1251659	Upload Photo	Q26543601
Old Crown Inn	II	New Park Street	inn		9 April 1954	SU0033461707; 51°21′16″N 1°59′48″W		1250956	Old Crown Inn More images	Q26542963
Premises on East Corner of New Street	II*	New Park Street	architectural structure		9 April 1954	SU0043661647; 51°21′14″N 1°59′42″W		1251673	Premises on East Corner of New Street More images	Q17543980
Salem Chapel	II	New Park Street	chapel		9 April 1954	SU0034061659; 51°21′14″N 1°59′47″W		1251675	Salem Chapel More images	Q26543614
The Nags Head Public House	II	New Park Street			9 April 1954	SU0041461655; 51°21′14″N 1°59′44″W		1251674	The Nags Head Public House More images	Q26543613
Wadworths Brewery	II	New Park Street			19 September 1972	SU0021061672; 51°21′15″N 1°59′54″W		1250955	Upload Photo	Q26542962
Wall to New Park Road of Brownstone House	II	New Park Street			19 September 1972	SU0054761639; 51°21′14″N 1°59′37″W		1251614	Upload Photo	Q26543557
1, Northgate Street	II	1, Northgate Street			19 September 1972	SU0029161569; 51°21′12″N 1°59′50″W		1251676	Upload Photo	Q26543615
2 Northgate Street	II	2, Northgate Street			9 April 1954	SU0028361575; 51°21′12″N 1°59′50″W		1251704	Upload Photo	Q26543641
3, Northgate Street	II*	3, Northgate Street			9 April 1954	SU0027561581; 51°21′12″N 1°59′51″W		1251678	Upload Photo	Q17543981
4 and 5 Northgate Street	II	4 and 5, Northgate Street			19 September 1972	SU0026961588; 51°21′12″N 1°59′51″W		1251679	Upload Photo	Q26543617
6, Northgate Street	II	6, Northgate Street			19 September 1972	SU0025461597; 51°21′12″N 1°59′52″W		1251680	Upload Photo	Q26543618
7-10, Northgate Street	II	7-10, Northgate Street			19 September 1972	SU0025161601; 51°21′13″N 1°59′52″W		1251713	Upload Photo	Q26543650
11-13, Northgate Street	II	11-13, Northgate Street			19 September 1972	SU0022861610; 51°21′13″N 1°59′53″W		1251681	Upload Photo	Q26543619
14-18, Northgate Street	II	14-18, Northgate Street			19 September 1972	SU0021661616; 51°21′13″N 1°59′54″W		1262651	Upload Photo	Q26553515
19 and 20, Northgate Street	II	19 and 20, Northgate Street			9 April 1954	SU0018161624; 51°21′13″N 1°59′56″W		1251682	Upload Photo	Q26543620
27 and 27a, Northgate Street	II	27 and 27a, Northgate Street			19 September 1972	SU0007061704; 51°21′16″N 2°00′01″W		1262653	Upload Photo	Q26553517
Boundary Walls, Gates and Gate Piers of Numbers 27 and 27a	II	Gates And Gate Piers Of Numbers 27 and 27a, Northgate Street			19 September 1972	SU0004861698; 51°21′16″N 2°00′03″W		1251685	Upload Photo	Q26543621
50-52, Northgate Street	II	50-52, Northgate Street			19 September 1972	SU0025961619; 51°21′13″N 1°59′52″W		1262654	Upload Photo	Q26553518
Literary and Scientific Institute	II	53, Northgate Street			19 September 1972	SU0026861621; 51°21′13″N 1°59′51″W		1262609	Upload Photo	Q26553473
54 and 55, Northgate Street	II	54 and 55, Northgate Street			19 September 1972	SU0026861614; 51°21′13″N 1°59′51″W		1251749	Upload Photo	Q26543684
59, Northgate Street	II	59, Northgate Street			9 April 1954	SU0029461593; 51°21′12″N 1°59′50″W		1251686	Upload Photo	Q26543622
The Dolphin Public House	II	60, Northgate Street			19 September 1972	SU0030161588; 51°21′12″N 1°59′49″W		1251750	The Dolphin Public House More images	Q26543685
Forecourt Piers to St Mary's Congregational Church	II	Northgate Street			19 September 1972	SU0019361627; 51°21′13″N 1°59′55″W		1251721	Upload Photo	Q26543658
Law Courts and County Police Office	II*	Northgate Street	architectural structure		9 April 1954	SU0014261690; 51°21′15″N 1°59′58″W		1251744	Law Courts and County Police Office More images	Q17543992
Northgate House (formerly Judge's Lodging Now the Municipal Offices)	II*	Northgate Street	architectural structure		9 April 1954	SU0013361638; 51°21′14″N 1°59′58″W		1251684	Northgate House (formerly Judge's Lodging Now the Municipal Offices) More images	Q17543991
Sandcliffe	II*	Northgate Street	building		9 April 1954	SU0015961632; 51°21′14″N 1°59′57″W		1251683	Sandcliffe More images	Q17543983
St Mary's Congregational Church	II	Northgate Street	church building		19 September 1972	SU0018061597; 51°21′12″N 1°59′56″W		1262633	St Mary's Congregational Church More images	Q26553497
The White Lion Public House	II	Northgate Street			19 September 1972	SU0014961663; 51°21′15″N 1°59′57″W		1262608	The White Lion Public House More images	Q26553472
Nursteed Farmhouse	II	Nursteed			3 April 1987	SU0217060556; 51°20′39″N 1°58′13″W		1272948	Upload Photo	Q26562745
Nursteed House	II	Nursteed			3 April 1987	SU0201460408; 51°20′34″N 1°58′21″W		1272927	Upload Photo	Q26562727
Nursteed Place	II	Nursteed			3 April 1987	SU0204460429; 51°20′35″N 1°58′19″W		1243315	Upload Photo	Q26535998
The Fox and Hounds Inn	II	Nursteed			3 April 1987	SU0199360166; 51°20′26″N 1°58′22″W		1243346	The Fox and Hounds Inn More images	Q26536029
1, Nursteed Road	II	1, Nursteed Road			19 September 1972	SU0102461367; 51°21′05″N 1°59′12″W		1252253	Upload Photo	Q26544138
3, Nursteed Road (the Island)	II	3, Nursteed Road (the Island)			19 September 1972	SU0086461402; 51°21′06″N 1°59′20″W		1252250	Upload Photo	Q26544135
4 and 5, Nursteed Road (the Island)	II	4 and 5, Nursteed Road (the Island)			19 September 1972	SU0087261404; 51°21′06″N 1°59′20″W		1252251	Upload Photo	Q26544136
6-10, Nursteed Road (the Island)	II	6-10, Nursteed Road (the Island)			19 September 1972	SU0088761410; 51°21′06″N 1°59′19″W		1252252	Upload Photo	Q26544137
Broadleas	II	Potterne Road			19 March 1962	SU0010560164; 51°20′26″N 2°00′00″W		1243318	Upload Photo	Q26536001
Broadleas Lodge	II	Potterne Road			3 April 1987	SU0024359873; 51°20′17″N 1°59′52″W		1243317	Upload Photo	Q26536000
Greenbrae	II	Potterne Road			19 September 1972	SU0050860774; 51°20′46″N 1°59′39″W		1252254	Upload Photo	Q26544139
Milestone About 50 Metres North of Driveway to the Woods	II	Potterne Road			3 April 1987	SU0024660068; 51°20′23″N 1°59′52″W		1272949	Upload Photo	Q26562746
Southleigh	II	Potterne Road			19 September 1972	SU0052660575; 51°20′39″N 1°59′38″W		1262385	Upload Photo	Q26553263
Springfield	II	Potterne Road			19 September 1972	SU0051960673; 51°20′43″N 1°59′38″W		1252255	Upload Photo	Q26544140
Valley House	II	Potterne Road			3 April 1987	SU0030959788; 51°20′14″N 1°59′49″W		1243370	Upload Photo	Q26536051
Quakers Walk Lodge and Gates	II	Quakers Walk			3 April 1987	SU0062661831; 51°21′20″N 1°59′33″W		1272950	Upload Photo	Q26562747
Retaining Wall, Rails, Gates and Stable Yard Wall of Number 17	II*	Rails, Gates And Stable Yard Wall Of Number 17, Market Place			19 September 1972	SU0030361562; 51°21′11″N 1°59′49″W		1263273	Upload Photo	Q17544258
Home Farm House	II	Roundway Park			3 April 1987	SU0090462972; 51°21′57″N 1°59′18″W		1272951	Upload Photo	Q26562748
Roundway House	II	Roundway Park			19 March 1962	SU0069962674; 51°21′47″N 1°59′29″W		1243319	Upload Photo	Q26536002
New Baptist Chapel	II	Sheep Street	chapel		19 September 1972	SU0072061370; 51°21′05″N 1°59′28″W		1252369	New Baptist Chapel More images	Q26544243
1, Sidmouth Street (see Details for Further Address Information)	II	1, Sidmouth Street			19 September 1972	SU0067061434; 51°21′07″N 1°59′30″W		1262323	Upload Photo	Q26553207
2, Sidmouth Street	II	2, Sidmouth Street			19 September 1972	SU0068161435; 51°21′07″N 1°59′30″W		1252370	Upload Photo	Q26544244
3-6, Sidmouth Street	II	3-6, Sidmouth Street			19 September 1972	SU0069361441; 51°21′07″N 1°59′29″W		1252371	Upload Photo	Q26544245
7 and 8, Sidmouth Street (see Details for Further Address Information)	II	7 and 8, Sidmouth Street			19 September 1972	SU0070761446; 51°21′08″N 1°59′28″W		1262324	Upload Photo	Q26553208
10, Sidmouth Street	II	10, Sidmouth Street			19 September 1972	SU0071761450; 51°21′08″N 1°59′28″W		1252372	Upload Photo	Q26544246
Nos. 14, 15 and 16, Sidmouth Street	II	14, 15 and 16, Sidmouth Street			19 September 1972	SU0074461455; 51°21′08″N 1°59′27″W		1252373	Upload Photo	Q26544247
Farmers Steakhouse Sidmouth House Walker and Rose Limited	II	20, Sidmouth Street			19 September 1972	SU0076261441; 51°21′07″N 1°59′26″W		1262288	Upload Photo	Q26553174
23-28, Sidmouth Street	II	23-28, Sidmouth Street			19 September 1972	SU0072661431; 51°21′07″N 1°59′27″W		1262289	Upload Photo	Q26553175
Handel House	II*	29 and 30, Sidmouth Street			9 April 1954	SU0068561405; 51°21′06″N 1°59′30″W		1252375	Upload Photo	Q17544040
Woodbine Cottage, 33 Southbroom Road and 35, Southbroom Road	II	35, Southbroom Road, SN10 5BN			19 September 1972	SU0076361142; 51°20′58″N 1°59′26″W		1252380	Upload Photo	Q26544250
37, 39 and 41, Southbroom Road	II	37, 39 and 41, Southbroom Road, SN10 5BN			19 September 1972	SU0077261152; 51°20′58″N 1°59′25″W		1262270	Upload Photo	Q26553156
43 and 45, Southbroom Road	II	43 and 45, Southbroom Road, SN10 5BN			19 September 1972	SU0077661167; 51°20′58″N 1°59′25″W		1252415	Upload Photo	Q26544283
47 and 49, Southbroom Road	II	47 and 49, Southbroom Road, SN10 5BN			19 September 1972	SU0078161184; 51°20′59″N 1°59′25″W		1262271	Upload Photo	Q26553157
51, Southbroom Road	II	51, Southbroom Road, SN10 5BN			19 September 1972	SU0078261193; 51°20′59″N 1°59′25″W		1252416	Upload Photo	Q26544284
53, Southbroom Road	II	53, Southbroom Road, SN10 5BN			19 September 1972	SU0078161201; 51°21′00″N 1°59′25″W		1252417	Upload Photo	Q26544285
55 and 57, Southbroom Road	II	55 and 57, Southbroom Road, SN10 5BN			19 September 1972	SU0077061208; 51°21′00″N 1°59′25″W		1262272	Upload Photo	Q26553158
71 and 73, Southbroom Road	II	71 and 73, Southbroom Road			19 September 1972	SU0079261276; 51°21′02″N 1°59′24″W		1262273	Upload Photo	Q26553159
75-79, Southbroom Road	II	75-79, Southbroom Road			19 September 1972	SU0079061282; 51°21′02″N 1°59′24″W		1252418	Upload Photo	Q26544286
81-85, Southbroom Road	II	81-85, Southbroom Road			19 September 1972	SU0079461302; 51°21′03″N 1°59′24″W		1252419	Upload Photo	Q26544287
87, Southbroom Road	II	87, Southbroom Road			9 April 1954	SU0079761320; 51°21′03″N 1°59′24″W		1252420	Upload Photo	Q26544288
89-97, Southbroom Road	II	89-97, Southbroom Road			9 April 1954	SU0079861335; 51°21′04″N 1°59′24″W		1252421	Upload Photo	Q26544289
99, Southbroom Road	II	99, Southbroom Road			9 April 1954	SU0080261358; 51°21′05″N 1°59′24″W		1252422	Upload Photo	Q26544290
103 and 105, Southbroom Road	II	103 and 105, Southbroom Road			19 September 1972	SU0080261379; 51°21′05″N 1°59′24″W		1252424	Upload Photo	Q26544292
107-113, Southbroom Road	II	107-113, Southbroom Road			19 September 1972	SU0080261390; 51°21′06″N 1°59′24″W		1262274	Upload Photo	Q26553160
117 and 119, Southbroom Road	II	117 and 119, Southbroom Road			19 September 1972	SU0078661420; 51°21′07″N 1°59′24″W		1252444	Upload Photo	Q26544311
Boundary Wall of Southbroom House Including Small Gateway to Devizes Green	II	Southbroom Road			19 September 1972	SU0097561338; 51°21′04″N 1°59′15″W		1252379	Upload Photo	Q26544249
Boundary Wall to Front of Heathcote House	II*	Southbroom Road			19 September 1972	SU0081861184; 51°20′59″N 1°59′23″W		1252377	Upload Photo	Q17544050
Heathcote House	II*	Southbroom Road			9 April 1954	SU0083661171; 51°20′59″N 1°59′22″W		1252376	Upload Photo	Q17544044
The Volunteer Arms Public House	II	Southbroom Road			9 April 1954	SU0080161375; 51°21′05″N 1°59′24″W		1252423	Upload Photo	Q26544291
Southbroom House	II	Southbrrom Road			9 April 1954	SU0098161277; 51°21′02″N 1°59′14″W		1252378	Upload Photo	Q7569235
5-10, Southgate	II	5-10, Southgate			19 September 1972	SU0062960964; 51°20′52″N 1°59′32″W		1252445	Upload Photo	Q26544312
11 and 12, Southgate	II	11 and 12, Southgate			19 September 1972	SU0063060977; 51°20′52″N 1°59′32″W		1262275	Upload Photo	Q26553161
13, Southgate	II	13, Southgate			19 September 1972	SU0062960983; 51°20′53″N 1°59′32″W		1262285	Upload Photo	Q26553171
14 and 15, Southgate	II	14 and 15, Southgate			19 September 1972	SU0062960989; 51°20′53″N 1°59′32″W		1252427	Upload Photo	Q26544294
6, St John's Alley	II*	6, St John's Alley			9 April 1954	SU0045261398; 51°21′06″N 1°59′42″W		1252257	Upload Photo	Q17544011
Patch Cottage	II	12, St John's Alley			19 September 1972	SU0046561391; 51°21′06″N 1°59′41″W		1252279	Upload Photo	Q26544162
12a, St John's Alley	II	12a, St John's Alley			19 September 1972	SU0046761385; 51°21′06″N 1°59′41″W		1252258	Upload Photo	Q26544142
1 and 2, St John's Churchyard	II	1 and 2, St John's Churchyard			19 September 1972	SU0046061280; 51°21′02″N 1°59′41″W		1252259	Upload Photo	Q26544143
Chancel End	II*	St John's Churchyard			9 April 1954	SU0050861249; 51°21′01″N 1°59′39″W		1262363	Upload Photo	Q17544232
Church of St John the Baptist	I	St John's Churchyard	church building		9 April 1954	SU0046961241; 51°21′01″N 1°59′41″W		1262359	Church of St John the Baptist More images	Q17529797
Gates and Overthrow at Entrance to St John's Churchyard from St John's Court	II	St John's Churchyard			19 September 1972	SU0046761279; 51°21′02″N 1°59′41″W		1262347	Upload Photo	Q26553228
Obelisk in St John's Churchyard	II	St John's Churchyard			19 September 1972	SU0043361233; 51°21′01″N 1°59′43″W		1252285	Upload Photo	Q26544168
Sexton's Cottage to West of Church	II	St John's Churchyard			9 April 1954	SU0039561242; 51°21′01″N 1°59′45″W		1252291	Upload Photo	Q26544174
1-3, St John's Court	II	1-3, St John's Court			9 April 1954	SU0047161287; 51°21′02″N 1°59′41″W		1262348	Upload Photo	Q26553229
4, St John's Court	II	4, St John's Court			9 April 1954	SU0045861290; 51°21′02″N 1°59′41″W		1252294	Upload Photo	Q26544177
The Liberal Club	II	St John's Court			9 April 1954	SU0044261285; 51°21′02″N 1°59′42″W		1252260	Upload Photo	Q26544144
Hsbc Bank	II	1, St John's Street			9 April 1954	SU0043461458; 51°21′08″N 1°59′43″W		1250842	Upload Photo	Q26542863
Barclays Bank	II	2 and 3, St John's Street			19 September 1972	SU0043461443; 51°21′07″N 1°59′43″W		1252261	Upload Photo	Q26544145
4 and 5, St John's Street	II	4 and 5, St John's Street			19 September 1972	SU0043961439; 51°21′07″N 1°59′42″W		1252304	Upload Photo	Q26544187
6-9, St John's Street	II	6-9, St John's Street			9 April 1954	SU0044261399; 51°21′06″N 1°59′42″W		1252305	Upload Photo	Q26544188
Nos. 11 and 12 St John's Street	II	11 and 12, St John's Street			5 March 2003	SU0045561384; 51°21′06″N 1°59′41″W		1429126	Upload Photo	Q26677498
13 and 14, St John's Street	II	13 and 14, St John's Street			9 April 1954	SU0046961379; 51°21′05″N 1°59′41″W		1252306	Upload Photo	Q26544189
15, St John's Street	II	15, St John's Street			9 April 1954	SU0047461371; 51°21′05″N 1°59′40″W		1262336	Upload Photo	Q26553218
19, St John's Street	II	19, St John's Street			19 September 1972	SU0048861307; 51°21′03″N 1°59′40″W		1262330	Upload Photo	Q26553215
The Lamb Inn	II	20, St John's Street			9 April 1954	SU0048161304; 51°21′03″N 1°59′40″W		1252307	The Lamb Inn More images	Q26544190
21 and 22, St John's Street	II*	21 and 22, St John's Street			9 April 1954	SU0047161299; 51°21′03″N 1°59′41″W		1252308	Upload Photo	Q17544015
23 and 24, St John's Street	II	23 and 24, St John's Street			19 September 1972	SU0045261312; 51°21′03″N 1°59′42″W		1252310	Upload Photo	Q26544191
25 and 26, St John's Street	II	25 and 26, St John's Street			19 September 1972	SU0045161323; 51°21′04″N 1°59′42″W		1262333	Upload Photo	Q26553217
28, St John's Street	II*	28, St John's Street	building		9 April 1954	SU0044061336; 51°21′04″N 1°59′42″W		1252312	28, St John's Street More images	Q17544027
29 and 30, St John's Street	II*	29 and 30, St John's Street	building		9 April 1954	SU0044361354; 51°21′05″N 1°59′42″W		1262334	29 and 30, St John's Street More images	Q17544224
31 and 32, St John's Street	II	31 and 32, St John's Street			9 April 1954	SU0043761365; 51°21′05″N 1°59′42″W		1252313	Upload Photo	Q26544193
33 and 34, St John's Street	II*	33 and 34, St John's Street			9 April 1954	SU0041961369; 51°21′05″N 1°59′43″W		1262335	Upload Photo	Q17544230
Barford House	II*	35, St John's Street	house		7 September 1970	SU0042261384; 51°21′06″N 1°59′43″W		1252314	Barford House More images	Q17544031
36, St John's Street	II	36, St John's Street			9 April 1954	SU0041861401; 51°21′06″N 1°59′43″W		1252315	Upload Photo	Q26544194
37 and 38, St John's Street	II	37 and 38, St John's Street			9 April 1954	SU0040961407; 51°21′06″N 1°59′44″W		1252316	37 and 38, St John's Street More images	Q26544195
39, St John's Street	II*	39, St John's Street			9 April 1954	SU0040661420; 51°21′07″N 1°59′44″W		1252317	39, St John's Street More images	Q17544036
40, St John's Street	II	40, St John's Street			19 September 1972	SU0040561427; 51°21′07″N 1°59′44″W		1262321	40, St John's Street More images	Q26553205
District Club	II	St John's Street			9 April 1954	SU0044561328; 51°21′04″N 1°59′42″W		1252311	Upload Photo	Q26544192
Lamp Standards in Front of Town Hall on North Side	II*	St John's Street			19 September 1972	SU0046361340; 51°21′04″N 1°59′41″W		1252309	Upload Photo	Q17544024
The Town Hall	II*	St John's Street	city hall		9 April 1954	SU0046861335; 51°21′04″N 1°59′41″W		1262331	The Town Hall More images	Q17544219
Tower Lee	II	St John's Walk			19 September 1972	SU0045161276; 51°21′02″N 1°59′42″W		1252367	Upload Photo	Q26544241
10, St Johns Street	II	10, St Johns Street			5 March 2003	SU0044761387; 51°21′06″N 1°59′42″W		1096154	Upload Photo	Q26388445
Church of the Immaculate Conception	II	St Joseph's Walk	church building		19 September 1972	ST9996761601; 51°21′13″N 2°00′07″W		1252368	Church of the Immaculate Conception More images	Q26544242
1 and 2, the Brittox (see Details for Further Address Information)	II	1 and 2, The Brittox			19 September 1972	SU0047461453; 51°21′08″N 1°59′40″W		1263766	Upload Photo	Q26554535
4 and 4a, the Brittox	II	4 and 4a, The Brittox			9 April 1954	SU0048461464; 51°21′08″N 1°59′40″W		1249427	Upload Photo	Q26541561
5, the Brittox	II	5, The Brittox			19 September 1972	SU0049461466; 51°21′08″N 1°59′39″W		1249428	Upload Photo	Q26541562
6, the Brittox	II	6, The Brittox			19 September 1972	SU0049861468; 51°21′08″N 1°59′39″W		1263767	Upload Photo	Q26554536
7, the Brittox	II	7, The Brittox			19 September 1972	SU0050761470; 51°21′08″N 1°59′39″W		1263729	Upload Photo	Q26554499
16, the Brittox	II	16, The Brittox			9 April 1954	SU0056461497; 51°21′09″N 1°59′36″W		1263744	Upload Photo	Q26554514
18 and 19, the Brittox	II	18 and 19, The Brittox			19 September 1972	SU0056961472; 51°21′08″N 1°59′36″W		1249465	Upload Photo	Q26541597
20 and 21, the Brittox	II	20 and 21, The Brittox			9 April 1954	SU0055661465; 51°21′08″N 1°59′36″W		1263745	Upload Photo	Q26554515
22-24, the Brittox	II	22-24, The Brittox			9 April 1954	SU0054861457; 51°21′08″N 1°59′37″W		1249466	Upload Photo	Q26541598
25, the Brittox	II	25, The Brittox			9 April 1954	SU0053061453; 51°21′08″N 1°59′38″W		1249467	Upload Photo	Q26541599
26, the Brittox	II	26, The Brittox			9 April 1954	SU0052261450; 51°21′08″N 1°59′38″W		1263746	Upload Photo	Q26554516
29-32, the Brittox	II	29-32, The Brittox			19 September 1972	SU0049261440; 51°21′07″N 1°59′40″W		1249468	Upload Photo	Q26541600
K6 Telephone Kiosk, the Chequers	II	The Chequers			31 January 1989	SU0047961364; 51°21′05″N 1°59′40″W		1252430	Upload Photo	Q26544297
Besborough Lodge	II	The Nursery			9 April 1954	SU0002861684; 51°21′15″N 2°00′04″W		1251687	Upload Photo	Q26543623
Melbourne House	II	The Nursery			19 September 1972	ST9992261698; 51°21′16″N 2°00′09″W		1251770	Upload Photo	Q26543704
The Town Bridge	II	The Nursery			9 April 1954	SU0002661699; 51°21′16″N 2°00′04″W		1262655	Upload Photo	Q26553519
Bath Road (see Details for Further Address Information)	II	1-5, Trafalgar Place			9 April 1954	ST9979761693; 51°21′16″N 2°00′15″W		1249365	Upload Photo	Q26541505
Parkdale House and Attached Railings, Wall and Outbuilding	II	Wall And Outbuilding, St Joseph's Road			20 November 1992	ST9975461542; 51°21′11″N 2°00′18″W		1262279	Upload Photo	Q26553165
Farmyard Complex to North East of Roundway Hospital Main Building	II	Wick Lane			16 October 1995	SU0111260059; 51°20′23″N 1°59′08″W		1271778	Upload Photo	Q26561688
Gatehouse and Walls Flanking Entrance North of Roundway Hospital Main Building	II	Wick Lane			16 October 1995	SU0089860410; 51°20′34″N 1°59′19″W		1259557	Upload Photo	Q26550659
Roundway Hospital (main Building)	II	Wick Lane			27 November 1987	SU0093459938; 51°20′19″N 1°59′17″W		1244048	Upload Photo	Q26536693
Stone House to the Rear of Roundway Hospital Main Building	II	Wick Lane			16 October 1995	SU0083659972; 51°20′20″N 1°59′22″W		1245638	Upload Photo	Q26538151
The Old Town Hall	II*	1, Wine Street	architectural structure		9 April 1954	SU0043861416; 51°21′07″N 1°59′42″W		1252446	The Old Town Hall More images	Q17544059
2, Wine Street	II	2, Wine Street			9 April 1954	SU0044461421; 51°21′07″N 1°59′42″W		1262276	Upload Photo	Q26553162
3, Wine Street	II	3, Wine Street			19 September 1972	SU0045361423; 51°21′07″N 1°59′42″W		1252428	Upload Photo	Q26544295
4, Wine Street	II	4, Wine Street			19 September 1972	SU0046061426; 51°21′07″N 1°59′41″W		1252447	Upload Photo	Q26544313
5, Wine Street (see Details for Further Address Information)	II	5, Wine Street			19 September 1972	SU0045161439; 51°21′07″N 1°59′42″W		1262277	Upload Photo	Q26553163

== See also ==
- Grade I listed buildings in Wiltshire
- Grade II* listed buildings in Wiltshire

== Sources ==
- Orbach, Julian; Pevsner, Nikolaus; Cherry, Bridget (2021), Wiltshire, The Buildings of England, New Haven and London: Yale University Press, ISBN 978-0-300-25120-3
