= Listed buildings in Marlborough, Wiltshire =

Buildings in Marlborough, Wiltshire, England

Marlborough is a town and civil parish in Wiltshire, England. It contains 292 listed buildings that are recorded in the National Heritage List for England. Of these two are grade I, ten are grade II* and 280 are grade II.

This list is based on information retrieved online from Historic England.

== Key ==
Grade	Criteria
I	Buildings that are of exceptional interest
II*	Particularly important buildings of more than special interest
II	Buildings that are of special interest

== Listing ==
Name	Grade	Location	Type	Completed (Note: The date given is the date used by Historic England as significant for the initial building or that of an important part in the structure's description.)	Date designated	Grid ref. (Note: The grid reference is based on the British national grid reference system, sometimes known as OSGB36, used by the Ordnance Survey.) Geo-coordinates	Notes	Entry number (Note: The "List Entry Number" is a unique number assigned to each listed building and scheduled monument by Historic England.)	Image	Wikidata
Pavement In Front Of Whole Row, And Up To Archway To High Street	II	Alma Place			21 October 1974	SU1886169084; 51°25′14″N 1°43′49″W		1034260	Upload Photo	Q26285791
Coach House between Numbers 11 and 12	II	Alma Place			21 October 1974	SU1885169089; 51°25′14″N 1°43′49″W		1034303	Upload Photo	Q26285838
1-10, Alma Place	II	1-10, Alma Place			21 October 1974	SU1886769070; 51°25′13″N 1°43′48″W		1365377	Upload Photo	Q26647071
11, Alma Place	II	11, Alma Place			21 October 1974	SU1885569084; 51°25′14″N 1°43′49″W		1262075	Upload Photo	Q26552975
12, Alma Place	II	12, Alma Place			21 October 1974	SU1884669094; 51°25′14″N 1°43′49″W		1034259	Upload Photo	Q26285790
Alma House	II	14, Alma Place			21 October 1974	SU1883869102; 51°25′14″N 1°43′50″W		1365396	Upload Photo	Q26647090
Messrs Frees' Warehouse	II	Angel Yard			21 October 1974	SU1890469081; 51°25′14″N 1°43′46″W		1034262	Upload Photo	Q26285794
1 and 2, Angel Yard	II	1 and 2, Angel Yard			21 October 1974	SU1886869127; 51°25′15″N 1°43′48″W		1365397	Upload Photo	Q26647091
3 and 4, Angel Yard	II	3 and 4, Angel Yard			21 October 1974	SU1887669116; 51°25′15″N 1°43′48″W		1034261	Upload Photo	Q26285793
Coach House Behind Castle and Ball Hotel	II	Back Lane			21 October 1974	SU1866669145; 51°25′16″N 1°43′59″W		1365398	Upload Photo	Q26647092
1-3, Barn Street	II	1-3, Barn Street			21 October 1974	SU1903769254; 51°25′19″N 1°43′39″W		1034263	Upload Photo	Q26285795
4, Barn Street	II	4, Barn Street			21 October 1974	SU1904569244; 51°25′19″N 1°43′39″W		1365399	Upload Photo	Q26647093
Newton House	II	5, Barn Street			18 July 1949	SU1904869236; 51°25′19″N 1°43′39″W		1034264	Upload Photo	Q26285796
6 and 7, Barn Street	II	6 and 7, Barn Street			18 July 1949	SU1905769223; 51°25′18″N 1°43′38″W		1034265	Upload Photo	Q26285797
Wye House And Garden Walls In Front Of House	II	8, Barn Street, Sn8 1b			18 July 1949	SU1908769207; 51°25′18″N 1°43′37″W		1365400	Upload Photo	Q26647094
9-11, Barn Street	II	9-11, Barn Street			21 October 1974	SU1907369170; 51°25′16″N 1°43′38″W		1252840	Upload Photo	Q26544672
Barton Farm House	II	Bath Road			21 October 1974	SU1825368903; 51°25′08″N 1°44′20″W		1034266	Upload Photo	Q26285798
Barton Farm Stables	II	Bath Road			21 October 1974	SU1824368974; 51°25′10″N 1°44′21″W		1034267	Upload Photo	Q26285799
Barton Hill	II	Bath Road			21 October 1974	SU1814668779; 51°25′04″N 1°44′26″W		1034268	Upload Photo	Q26285801
Cotton House	II	Bath Road			21 October 1974	SU1795168802; 51°25′05″N 1°44′36″W		1034269	Upload Photo	Q26285802
Rose Cottage	II	Bath Road			21 October 1974	SU1788668759; 51°25′03″N 1°44′39″W		1034270	Upload Photo	Q26285803
Lodge to Upcot	II	Bath Road			21 October 1974	SU1759868762; 51°25′03″N 1°44′54″W		1034271	Upload Photo	Q26285804
Littlefield	II	Bath Road			21 October 1974	SU1805068805; 51°25′05″N 1°44′31″W		1252912	Upload Photo	Q26544738
Upcot	II	Bath Road			3 September 1973	SU1768768794; 51°25′04″N 1°44′49″W		1252937	Upload Photo	Q26544759
Preshute Vicarage	II	Bath Road			21 October 1974	SU1800668761; 51°25′03″N 1°44′33″W		1262015	Upload Photo	Q26552918
Elmhurst	II	Bath Road			21 October 1974	SU1816968798; 51°25′04″N 1°44′24″W		1365401	Upload Photo	Q26647095
Virginia Cottage	II	Bath Road			21 October 1974	SU1790968755; 51°25′03″N 1°44′38″W		1365402	Upload Photo	Q26647096
Southfield	II	Bridewell Street			21 October 1974	SU1847368842; 51°25′06″N 1°44′09″W		1034272	Upload Photo	Q26285805
Marlborough College Gymnasium	II	Bridewell Street			21 October 1974	SU1848968832; 51°25′06″N 1°44′08″W		1034273	Upload Photo	Q26285806
Mount House	II	Bridewell Street, SN8 1HG			18 July 1949	SU1849368803; 51°25′05″N 1°44′08″W		1262023	Upload Photo	Q26552926
Stables at Elcot Mill	II	Buck Lane			21 October 1974	SU2040269157; 51°25′16″N 1°42′29″W		1243101	Upload Photo	Q26535805
Elcot Mill House	II	Buck Lane			21 October 1974	SU2037669130; 51°25′15″N 1°42′30″W		1243209	Upload Photo	Q26535898
Brick Walls Facing Path to Rear of Numbers 136-138 High Street	II	Chandlers Yard			29 March 1979	SU1877169228; 51°25′18″N 1°43′53″W		1243603	Upload Photo	Q26536271
Hyde Cross	II	Cross Lane			12 February 1990	SU1846869433; 51°25′25″N 1°44′09″W		1243617	Upload Photo	Q26536284
The Lodge	II	Cross Lane			12 February 1990	SU1844469484; 51°25′27″N 1°44′10″W		1243618	Upload Photo	Q26536285
Clements Meadow	II	Cross Lane			12 February 1990	SU1851769417; 51°25′24″N 1°44′06″W		1272801	Upload Photo	Q26562609
Milestone at Ngr Su179172	II	Frees Avenue, Marlborough Common			13 May 1996	SU1791670164; 51°25′49″N 1°44′37″W		1268465	Upload Photo	Q26558772
1-3, George Lane	II	1-3, George Lane			21 October 1974	SU1921268930; 51°25′09″N 1°43′30″W		1252942	Upload Photo	Q26544763
4, George Lane	II	4, George Lane			21 October 1974	SU1921568897; 51°25′08″N 1°43′30″W		1243242	Upload Photo	Q26535929
5-7, George Lane	II	5-7, George Lane			21 October 1974	SU1920268923; 51°25′08″N 1°43′31″W		1034274	Upload Photo	Q26285807
8, George Lane	II	8, George Lane			21 October 1974	SU1917668918; 51°25′08″N 1°43′32″W		1034275	Upload Photo	Q26285809
Number 58 Including Iron Railings	II	58, George Lane			21 October 1974	SU1898268837; 51°25′06″N 1°43′42″W		1261999	Upload Photo	Q26552903
Wall To Garden Of Number 9, Extending As Far As Number 12	II	Herd Street			21 October 1974	SU1891369426; 51°25′25″N 1°43′46″W		1034240	Upload Photo	Q26285770
Pavement Running from in Front of Number 5 to Just Past Number 9	II	Herd Street			21 October 1974	SU1893769394; 51°25′24″N 1°43′45″W		1365387	Upload Photo	Q26647081
2 And 3 Herd Street	II	2 and 3, Herd Street			21 October 1974	SU1895769357; 51°25′22″N 1°43′44″W		1365386	Upload Photo	Q26647080
4-6, Herd Street	II	4-6, Herd Street			21 October 1974	SU1894069381; 51°25′23″N 1°43′44″W		1034239	Upload Photo	Q26285769
12-15, Herd Street	II	12-15, Herd Street			21 October 1974	SU1889569446; 51°25′25″N 1°43′47″W		1034241	Upload Photo	Q26285771
26-29 Herd Street	II	26-29, Herd Street			21 October 1974	SU1891769448; 51°25′25″N 1°43′46″W		1365388	Upload Photo	Q26647082
30-33, Herd Street	II	30-33, Herd Street			21 October 1974	SU1892969432; 51°25′25″N 1°43′45″W		1034242	Upload Photo	Q26285772
35 Herd Street	II	35, Herd Street			21 October 1974	SU1894069413; 51°25′24″N 1°43′44″W		1365389	Upload Photo	Q26647083
Numbers 36 And 37, Including Pavement In Front	II	36 and 37, Herd Street			21 October 1974	SU1894569407; 51°25′24″N 1°43′44″W		1034243	Upload Photo	Q26285773
39-43 Herd Street	II	39-43, Herd Street			21 October 1974	SU1897969363; 51°25′23″N 1°43′42″W		1365390	Upload Photo	Q26647084
Potters End	II	High Street			21 October 1974	SU1867069078; 51°25′13″N 1°43′58″W		1034225	Upload Photo	Q26285755
Midland Bank	II	High Street			21 October 1974	SU1885269202; 51°25′17″N 1°43′49″W		1034233	Midland Bank More images	Q26285763
Stable Block to Number 28 (the Priory)	II	High Street			21 October 1974	SU1875968993; 51°25′11″N 1°43′54″W		1034250	Upload Photo	Q26285781
Church of St Peter	II*	High Street, SN8 1HQ			18 July 1949	SU1857968793; 51°25′04″N 1°44′03″W		1034258	Church of St Peter More images	Q17539704
The Town Hall	II	High Street, Centre Island			21 October 1974	SU1887569196; 51°25′17″N 1°43′48″W		1242852	The Town Hall More images	Q26535579
The Castle and Ball Hotel	II	High Street			18 July 1949	SU1872269065; 51°25′13″N 1°43′56″W		1258155	The Castle and Ball Hotel More images	Q26549429
K6 Telephone Kiosk Outside Public Library, High Street	II	High Street			23 March 1989	SU1861168881; 51°25′07″N 1°44′02″W		1272819	Upload Photo	Q26562626
The Sun Public House	II	High Street			21 October 1974	SU1859668862; 51°25′06″N 1°44′02″W		1365417	Upload Photo	Q26647110
The Bear Hotel	II	1, High Street			21 October 1974	SU1890469180; 51°25′17″N 1°43′46″W		1253158	The Bear Hotel More images	Q26544946
2, High Street	II	2, High Street			12 July 1979	SU1889969176; 51°25′17″N 1°43′47″W		1243608	2, High Street More images	Q26536275
3 and 4, High Street	II	3 and 4, High Street			19 July 1949	SU1889269170; 51°25′16″N 1°43′47″W		1034244	3 and 4, High Street More images	Q26285774
5, High Street	II	5, High Street			19 July 1949	SU1888069162; 51°25′16″N 1°43′48″W		1253167	5, High Street More images	Q26544955: 1. REF!
7, High Street	II	7, High Street			21 October 1974	SU1885369139; 51°25′15″N 1°43′49″W		1365391	7, High Street More images	Q26647085
10 and 11, High Street	II	10 and 11, High Street			19 July 1949	SU1883269118; 51°25′15″N 1°43′50″W		1034246	10 and 11, High Street More images	Q26285777
The Green Dragon Public House	II	12, High Street			21 October 1974	SU1882169104; 51°25′14″N 1°43′51″W		1365392	The Green Dragon Public House More images	Q26647086
16, High Street	II	16, High Street			21 October 1974	SU1880769088; 51°25′14″N 1°43′51″W		1253276	16, High Street More images	Q26545044
Cinema	II	17, High Street			21 October 1974	SU1879569078; 51°25′13″N 1°43′52″W		1034247	Cinema More images	Q26285778
19 and 20, High Street	II	19 and 20, High Street			21 October 1974	SU1877969060; 51°25′13″N 1°43′53″W		1253281	19 and 20, High Street More images	Q26545048
25, High Street	II	25, High Street			21 October 1974	SU1875569032; 51°25′12″N 1°43′54″W		1034248	Upload Photo	Q26285779
26 and 27, High Street	II	26 and 27, High Street			18 July 1949	SU1874569017; 51°25′11″N 1°43′55″W		1034249	26 and 27, High Street More images	Q26285780
The Priory	II	28, High Street			18 July 1949	SU1874968972; 51°25′10″N 1°43′54″W		1261853	Upload Photo	Q26552774
30, High Street	II	30, High Street			21 October 1974	SU1871868983; 51°25′10″N 1°43′56″W		1261854	30, High Street More images	Q26552775
31-34, High Street	II	31-34, High Street			18 July 1949	SU1871168976; 51°25′10″N 1°43′56″W		1034251	Upload Photo	Q26285782
35, High Street	II	35, High Street			21 October 1974	SU1870168959; 51°25′10″N 1°43′57″W		1034252	Upload Photo	Q26285783
36 and 37, High Street	II*	36 and 37, High Street			18 July 1949	SU1869668953; 51°25′09″N 1°43′57″W		1253338	36 and 37, High Street More images	Q17544096
38 and 39, High Street	II	38 and 39, High Street			21 October 1974	SU1869268946; 51°25′09″N 1°43′57″W		1034253	Upload Photo	Q26285785
Lloran House	II	42, High Street			18 July 1949	SU1866568904; 51°25′08″N 1°43′59″W		1034254	Lloran House More images	Q26285786
Ivy House Hotel	II	43, High Street			18 July 1949	SU1866368891; 51°25′07″N 1°43′59″W		1253343	Upload Photo	Q26545103
44 and 45, High Street	II	44 and 45, High Street			21 October 1974	SU1865168882; 51°25′07″N 1°43′59″W		1034255	Upload Photo	Q26285787
The Wellington Arms	II	47 and 48, High Street			21 October 1974	SU1864568871; 51°25′07″N 1°44′00″W		1253344	The Wellington Arms More images	Q26545104
49, High Street	II	49, High Street			21 October 1974	SU1863968857; 51°25′06″N 1°44′00″W		1365393	49, High Street More images	Q26647087
50 and 50a, High Street	II	50 and 50a, High Street			18 July 1949	SU1863268845; 51°25′06″N 1°44′00″W		1034256	Upload Photo	Q26285788
Wall To Former Stableyard Of St Peter's Rectory, Extending From Number 50 To Number 51	II	High Street			21 October 1974	SU1862068830; 51°25′05″N 1°44′01″W		1242844	Upload Photo	Q26535572
St Peter's Rectory	II	51, High Street			21 October 1974	SU1862468808; 51°25′05″N 1°44′01″W		1365394	St Peter's Rectory More images	Q26647088
Far End Including Railings	II	52, High Street			21 October 1974	SU1860568788; 51°25′04″N 1°44′02″W		1034257	Far End Including Railings More images	Q26285789
53-64, High Street	II	53-64, High Street			14 August 1995	SU1858368754; 51°25′03″N 1°44′03″W		1243622	Upload Photo	Q26536289
65 and 66, High Street	II	65 and 66, High Street			21 October 1974	SU1853868762; 51°25′03″N 1°44′05″W		1242889	Upload Photo	Q26535613
68, High Street	II	68, High Street			21 October 1974	SU1854668778; 51°25′04″N 1°44′05″W		1365395	Upload Photo	Q26647089
69, High Street	II	69, High Street			21 October 1974	SU1854868781; 51°25′04″N 1°44′05″W		1034214	Upload Photo	Q26285742
70 and 71, High Street	II	70 and 71, High Street			21 October 1974	SU1855168788; 51°25′04″N 1°44′05″W		1365413	Upload Photo	Q26647106
72, High Street	II	72, High Street			21 October 1974	SU1855568794; 51°25′04″N 1°44′04″W		1034215	Upload Photo	Q26285743
73 and 74, High Street	II	73 and 74, High Street			21 October 1974	SU1856068800; 51°25′04″N 1°44′04″W		1034216	Upload Photo	Q26285744
75, High Street	II	75, High Street			21 October 1974	SU1856268808; 51°25′05″N 1°44′04″W		1365414	Upload Photo	Q26647107
76, High Street	II	76, High Street			21 October 1974	SU1856868815; 51°25′05″N 1°44′04″W		1034217	Upload Photo	Q26285746
77 and 78, High Street	II	77 and 78, High Street			21 October 1974	SU1857268823; 51°25′05″N 1°44′04″W		1365415	Upload Photo	Q26647108
80 and 81, High Street	II	80 and 81, High Street			21 October 1974	SU1857668831; 51°25′05″N 1°44′03″W		1034218	Upload Photo	Q26285747
82 and 83, High Street	II	82 and 83, High Street			21 October 1974	SU1858068840; 51°25′06″N 1°44′03″W		1365416	Upload Photo	Q26647109
84 and 85, High Street	II	84 and 85, High Street			21 October 1974	SU1858668850; 51°25′06″N 1°44′03″W		1034219	Upload Photo	Q26285748
86, High Street	II	86, High Street			21 October 1974	SU1859268854; 51°25′06″N 1°44′02″W		1034220	Upload Photo	Q26285750
The Public Library	II	88-90, High Street			21 October 1974	SU1860168882; 51°25′07″N 1°44′02″W		1034221	The Public Library More images	Q26285751
93-98, High Street	II	93-98, High Street			21 October 1974	SU1862168904; 51°25′08″N 1°44′01″W		1259784	93-98, High Street More images	Q26550875
99 and 99a, High Street	II*	99 and 99a, High Street			1 April 1985	SU1863368933; 51°25′09″N 1°44′00″W		1257278	99 and 99a, High Street More images	Q17544110
Number 100, Including Outhouse To Rear	II	100, High Street			21 October 1974	SU1863968938; 51°25′09″N 1°44′00″W		1365418	Number 100, Including Outhouse To Rear More images	Q26647111
106, High Street	II	106, High Street			21 October 1974	SU1865768975; 51°25′10″N 1°43′59″W		1034222	106, High Street More images	Q26285752
Number 107, Including Railings	II	107, High Street			21 October 1974	SU1866668979; 51°25′10″N 1°43′59″W		1242985	Number 107, Including Railings More images	Q26535702
108, High Street	II	108, High Street			21 October 1974	SU1866468989; 51°25′11″N 1°43′59″W		1034223	108, High Street More images	Q26285753
The Georgian Restaurant	II	109, High Street			18 July 1949	SU1868569005; 51°25′11″N 1°43′58″W		1259796	The Georgian Restaurant More images	Q26550884
The Central Garage	II	110, High Street			21 October 1974	SU1866869034; 51°25′12″N 1°43′59″W		1365419	Upload Photo	Q26647112
Cromwell House	II	112, High Street			21 October 1974	SU1870269032; 51°25′12″N 1°43′57″W		1034224	Cromwell House More images	Q26285754
113, High Street	II	113, High Street			21 October 1974	SU1870469038; 51°25′12″N 1°43′57″W		1259778	113, High Street More images	Q26550870
114-116, High Street	II	114-116, High Street			18 July 1949	SU1871269046; 51°25′12″N 1°43′56″W		1365420	114-116, High Street More images	Q26647113
Outhouse Behind Number 120	II	117-120, High Street			21 October 1974	SU1873669079; 51°25′14″N 1°43′55″W		1034226	Upload Photo	Q26285756
121, High Street	II	121, High Street			21 October 1974	SU1875169098; 51°25′14″N 1°43′54″W		1258174	Upload Photo	Q26549446
122-124, High Street	II	122-124, High Street			18 July 1949	SU1875869102; 51°25′14″N 1°43′54″W		1034227	122-124, High Street More images	Q26285757
126, High Street	II	126, High Street			21 October 1974	SU1876769122; 51°25′15″N 1°43′53″W		1034228	Upload Photo	Q26285758
127, High Street	II	127, High Street			18 July 1949	SU1877269128; 51°25′15″N 1°43′53″W		1258201	Upload Photo	Q26549470
131, High Street	II	131, High Street			21 October 1974	SU1879769156; 51°25′16″N 1°43′52″W		1034229	131, High Street More images	Q26285760
132 and 133 and Outhouse to Rear of 133, High Street	II*	132 and 133 And Outhouse To Rear Of 133, High Street			18 July 1949	SU1880169160; 51°25′16″N 1°43′52″W		1034230	132 and 133 and Outhouse to Rear of 133, High Street More images	Q17539673
134 and 135, High Street	II	134 and 135, High Street			20 December 1968	SU1881369174; 51°25′17″N 1°43′51″W		1273511	134 and 135, High Street More images	Q26563250
136, High Street	II	136, High Street			18 July 1949	SU1882569182; 51°25′17″N 1°43′50″W		1034231	136, High Street More images	Q26285761
137, High Street	II	137, High Street			18 July 1949	SU1883369181; 51°25′17″N 1°43′50″W		1258296	137, High Street More images	Q26549546
138, High Street	II	138, High Street			15 September 1970	SU1883569187; 51°25′17″N 1°43′50″W		1034232	138, High Street More images	Q26285762
139 and 140, High Street	II	139 and 140, High Street			21 October 1974	SU1884269192; 51°25′17″N 1°43′49″W		1365421	139 and 140, High Street More images	Q26647114
141, High Street	II	141, High Street			21 October 1974	SU1884869197; 51°25′17″N 1°43′49″W		1258313	Upload Photo	Q26549561
142 and 143, High Street	II*	142 and 143, High Street			18 July 1949	SU1886069210; 51°25′18″N 1°43′49″W		1034234	142 and 143, High Street More images	Q17539690
144, High Street	II	144, High Street			18 July 1949	SU1886669216; 51°25′18″N 1°43′48″W		1258390	144, High Street More images	Q26549629
Range of Former Stabling and Coach Houses	II	Hilliers Yard			21 October 1974	SU1881169007; 51°25′11″N 1°43′51″W		1365422	Upload Photo	Q26647115
Stables and Coach House to the Hermitage	II	Hyde Lane			21 October 1974	SU1854168950; 51°25′09″N 1°44′05″W		1034235	Upload Photo	Q26285764
Hyde Close The Hermitage	II*	Hyde Lane			21 October 1974	SU1854368915; 51°25′08″N 1°44′05″W		1258407	Upload Photo	Q17544132
Wall to Hermitage and Hyde Close	II	Hyde Lane			21 October 1974	SU1855368926; 51°25′09″N 1°44′05″W		1365423	Upload Photo	Q26647116
1, Kennet Place	II	1, Kennet Place			21 October 1974	SU1900269085; 51°25′14″N 1°43′41″W		1258451	Upload Photo	Q26549684
2-9, Kennet Place	II	2-9, Kennet Place			21 October 1974	SU1900769065; 51°25′13″N 1°43′41″W		1365442	Upload Photo	Q26647135
1-4, Kingsbury Square	II	1-4, Kingsbury Square			21 October 1974	SU1879169479; 51°25′26″N 1°43′52″W		1034192	Upload Photo	Q26285716
Garden Wall between Number 14a and the Paddock, Returning West, And Then South As Garden Wall Of Gallows Close And Sycamore	II	Kingsbury Street			21 October 1974	SU1880369387; 51°25′23″N 1°43′51″W		1034196	Upload Photo	Q26285720
1 and 2, Kingsbury Street	II	1 and 2, Kingsbury Street			21 October 1974	SU1887169222; 51°25′18″N 1°43′48″W		1034193	Upload Photo	Q26285717
4-8, Kingsbury Street	II	4-8, Kingsbury Street			21 October 1974	SU1884369249; 51°25′19″N 1°43′49″W		1365443	Upload Photo	Q26647136
9, Kingsbury Street	II	9, Kingsbury Street			21 October 1974	SU1884069260; 51°25′19″N 1°43′50″W		1034194	Upload Photo	Q26285718
10 and 11, Kingsbury Street	II*	10 and 11, Kingsbury Street			18 July 1949	SU1883269277; 51°25′20″N 1°43′50″W		1365444	Upload Photo	Q17546708
Number 14 Including Railings and Walls	II	14, Kingsbury Street			21 October 1974	SU1882669333; 51°25′22″N 1°43′50″W		1034195	Upload Photo	Q26285719
Number 14a Including Courtyard to South of It	II	14a, Kingsbury Street			21 October 1974	SU1881569362; 51°25′23″N 1°43′51″W		1365405	Upload Photo	Q26647099
17-21, Kingsbury Street	II	17-21, Kingsbury Street			21 October 1974	SU1876269453; 51°25′26″N 1°43′54″W		1034197	Upload Photo	Q26285722
22-24 Kingsbury Street	II	22-24, Kingsbury Street			21 October 1974	SU1877669438; 51°25′25″N 1°43′53″W		1365406	Upload Photo	Q26647100
25 and 25a, Kingsbury Street	II	25 and 25a, Kingsbury Street			21 October 1974	SU1878669428; 51°25′25″N 1°43′52″W		1034198	Upload Photo	Q26285723
Number 26 Kingsbury Street, Including Railings	II	26, Kingsbury Street			21 October 1974	SU1879469417; 51°25′24″N 1°43′52″W		1365407	Upload Photo	Q26647101
Elm Cottage Including Railings	II	28, Kingsbury Street			21 October 1974	SU1881169403; 51°25′24″N 1°43′51″W		1258608	Upload Photo	Q26549825
Numbers 29 to 31 (consecutive) Including Railings	II	29-31, Kingsbury Street			21 October 1974	SU1881969391; 51°25′24″N 1°43′51″W		1034199	Upload Photo	Q26285724
Kingsbury Hill Cottage And Merle Cottage	II	32, Kingsbury Street			21 October 1974	SU1883869366; 51°25′23″N 1°43′50″W		1034200	Upload Photo	Q26285725
Kingsbury Hill House	II	34, Kingsbury Street			18 July 1949	SU1885469345; 51°25′22″N 1°43′49″W		1273367	Upload Photo	Q26563119
38 and 39, Kingsbury Street	II	38 and 39, Kingsbury Street			21 October 1974	SU1886669306; 51°25′21″N 1°43′48″W		1365408	Upload Photo	Q26647102
40 and 41, Kingsbury Street	II	40 and 41, Kingsbury Street			21 October 1974	SU1887269276; 51°25′20″N 1°43′48″W		1034201	Upload Photo	Q26285726
43, Kingsbury Street	II*	43, Kingsbury Street			18 July 1949	SU1887769252; 51°25′19″N 1°43′48″W		1365409	Upload Photo	Q17546702
44, Kingsbury Street	II	44, Kingsbury Street			18 July 1949	SU1888469241; 51°25′19″N 1°43′47″W		1258718	Upload Photo	Q26549924
45-48a, Kingsbury Street	II	45-48a, Kingsbury Street			21 October 1974	SU1889069222; 51°25′18″N 1°43′47″W		1034202	Upload Photo	Q26285727
Numbers 1 to 12 (consecutive) Including Pavement in Front	II	1-12, Kingsbury Terrace			21 October 1974	SU1881869439; 51°25′25″N 1°43′51″W		1034203	Upload Photo	Q26285728
Stables and Coach House to Five Alls Public House	II	London Road			21 October 1974	SU1915769127; 51°25′15″N 1°43′33″W		1034208	Upload Photo	Q26285735
Gateway in Wall to Right of Numbers 107 and 108	II	London Road			21 October 1974	SU1926468953; 51°25′09″N 1°43′28″W		1034213	Upload Photo	Q26285741
The Five Alls Public House	II	London Road			21 October 1974	SU1915469108; 51°25′14″N 1°43′33″W		1258792	Upload Photo	Q26549995
St Peter's and St Mary's Junior School	II	London Road			21 October 1974	SU1906269113; 51°25′15″N 1°43′38″W		1258855	Upload Photo	Q26550048
The Bridge Garage	II	London Road			21 October 1974	SU1916969040; 51°25′12″N 1°43′33″W		1365412	Upload Photo	Q26647105
Railings to St Peter's and St Mary's Junior School	II	London Road			21 October 1974	SU1906169131; 51°25′15″N 1°43′38″W		1365432	Upload Photo	Q26647125
3-5, London Road	II	3-5, London Road			21 October 1974	SU1909869147; 51°25′16″N 1°43′36″W		1365410	Upload Photo	Q26647103
6, London Road	II	6, London Road			21 October 1974	SU1911169145; 51°25′16″N 1°43′36″W		1034204	Upload Photo	Q26285729
7, London Road	II	7, London Road			21 October 1974	SU1911369140; 51°25′15″N 1°43′35″W		1258759	Upload Photo	Q26549963
9, London Road	II	9, London Road			21 October 1974	SU1912269135; 51°25′15″N 1°43′35″W		1034205	Upload Photo	Q26285730
10, London Road	II	10, London Road			21 October 1974	SU1913269128; 51°25′15″N 1°43′34″W		1258767	Upload Photo	Q26549971
11, London Road	II	11, London Road			21 October 1974	SU1914369124; 51°25′15″N 1°43′34″W		1034206	Upload Photo	Q26285732
12, London Road	II	12, London Road			21 October 1974	SU1914269117; 51°25′15″N 1°43′34″W		1034207	Upload Photo	Q26285733
14-23, London Road	II	14-23, London Road			21 October 1974	SU1918269082; 51°25′14″N 1°43′32″W		1034209	Upload Photo	Q26285736
Numbers 25 to 34 (consecutive) Including Railings	II	25-34, London Road			21 October 1974	SU1926168985; 51°25′10″N 1°43′28″W		1273242	Upload Photo	Q26563005
Albany Cottage Including Railings	II	40, London Road			21 October 1974	SU1933868997; 51°25′11″N 1°43′24″W		1034210	Upload Photo	Q26285737
Kennet House Including Railings Snettisham House	II	44, London Road			21 October 1974	SU1944369035; 51°25′12″N 1°43′18″W		1258829	Upload Photo	Q26550026
Numbers 45 and 46, Including Railings	II	45 and 46, London Road			21 October 1974	SU1946569041; 51°25′12″N 1°43′17″W		1034211	Upload Photo	Q26285738
52 and 53, London Road	II	52 and 53, London Road			21 October 1974	SU1975169038; 51°25′12″N 1°43′02″W		1365411	Upload Photo	Q26647104
95 and 96, London Road	II	95 and 96, London Road			21 October 1974	SU1941268997; 51°25′11″N 1°43′20″W		1258849	Upload Photo	Q26550042
98, London Road	II	98, London Road			21 October 1974	SU1937768988; 51°25′10″N 1°43′22″W		1034212	Upload Photo	Q26285739
107 and 108, London Road	II	107 and 108, London Road			21 October 1974	SU1927468949; 51°25′09″N 1°43′27″W		1258852	Upload Photo	Q26550045
112-118, London Road	II	112-118, London Road			14 August 1995	SU1915269076; 51°25′13″N 1°43′33″W		1272802	Upload Photo	Q26562610
119 and 120, London Road	II	119 and 120, London Road			18 July 1949	SU1912769097; 51°25′14″N 1°43′35″W		1258854	Upload Photo	Q26550047
Prospect Place	II	1-3, Lower Prospect			21 October 1974	SU1905569463; 51°25′26″N 1°43′38″W		1273305	Upload Photo	Q26563060
Manton Thatch	II	Manton Bridge Street			21 October 1974	SU1724068581; 51°24′58″N 1°45′13″W		1034170	Upload Photo	Q26285691
Coachhouse and Stables to Manton Weir	II	Manton Bridge Street			21 October 1974	SU1710568761; 51°25′03″N 1°45′19″W		1034171	Upload Photo	Q26285692
Manton Weir	II	Manton Bridge Street			21 October 1974	SU1708668796; 51°25′05″N 1°45′20″W		1258900	Upload Photo	Q26550084
Mill Cottages	II	Manton Bridge Street			21 October 1974	SU1706168702; 51°25′01″N 1°45′22″W		1365433	Upload Photo	Q26647126
Manton Weir Farmhouse	II	Manton High Street			21 October 1974	SU1723368495; 51°24′55″N 1°45′13″W		1034172	Upload Photo	Q26285693
Granary at Manton Grange	II	Manton High Street			21 October 1974	SU1730268453; 51°24′53″N 1°45′09″W		1034173	Upload Photo	Q26285694
The Post Office	II	Manton High Street			21 October 1974	SU1725468543; 51°24′56″N 1°45′12″W		1258940	Upload Photo	Q26550119
The Oddfellows Public House	II	Manton High Street			21 October 1974	SU1722268526; 51°24′56″N 1°45′13″W		1259025	Upload Photo	Q26550191
Stable and Farm Buildings Just East of Manton Weir Farmhouse	II	Manton High Street			21 October 1974	SU1726968489; 51°24′55″N 1°45′11″W		1273198	Upload Photo	Q26562966
Stable at Manton Grange	II	Manton High Street			21 October 1974	SU1732768452; 51°24′53″N 1°45′08″W		1365434	Upload Photo	Q26647127
17 and 18, Manton High Street	II	17 and 18, Manton High Street			21 October 1974	SU1704668470; 51°24′54″N 1°45′23″W		1259000	Upload Photo	Q26550169
25, Manton High Street	II	25, Manton High Street			21 October 1974	SU1696968475; 51°24′54″N 1°45′27″W		1365435	Upload Photo	Q26647128
68 and 69, Manton High Street	II	68 and 69, Manton High Street			21 October 1974	SU1719668523; 51°24′56″N 1°45′15″W		1034174	Upload Photo	Q26285696
73, Manton High Street	II	73, Manton High Street			21 October 1974	SU1723668551; 51°24′57″N 1°45′13″W		1034175	Upload Photo	Q26285697
Museum Block	II	Marlborough College			21 October 1974	SU1847168740; 51°25′03″N 1°44′09″W		1259055	Upload Photo	Q26550216
Bradleian Building	II	Marlborough College			21 October 1974	SU1843968764; 51°25′03″N 1°44′10″W		1259056	Upload Photo	Q26550217
North Block	II	Marlborough College			21 October 1974	SU1841568786; 51°25′04″N 1°44′12″W		1259057	Upload Photo	Q26550218
Porter's Lodge	II	Marlborough College			21 October 1974	SU1837968784; 51°25′04″N 1°44′14″W		1259058	Upload Photo	Q26550219
Chapel	II	Marlborough College			21 October 1974	SU1835668753; 51°25′03″N 1°44′15″W		1259061	Chapel More images	Q26550222
A House	II	Marlborough College			21 October 1974	SU1838868717; 51°25′02″N 1°44′13″W		1259062	Upload Photo	Q26550223
Master's Lodge	II	Marlborough College			21 October 1974	SU1855468692; 51°25′01″N 1°44′04″W		1259063	Master's Lodge More images	Q26550224
Old Sick House	II	Marlborough College			21 October 1974	SU1850568724; 51°25′02″N 1°44′07″W		1259064	Upload Photo	Q26550225
Former Stables to Marlborough Castle House	II	Marlborough College			21 October 1974	SU1847968786; 51°25′04″N 1°44′08″W		1259065	Upload Photo	Q26550226
Memorial Hall	II	Marlborough College			21 October 1974	SU1827668683; 51°25′01″N 1°44′19″W		1259066	Upload Photo	Q26550227
Arcade between Museum Block and Bradleian Building	II	Marlborough College			21 October 1974	SU1845068750; 51°25′03″N 1°44′10″W		1273150	Upload Photo	Q26562929
Grotto at Base of South Side of Castle Mound	II	Marlborough College			21 October 1974	SU1839068623; 51°24′59″N 1°44′13″W		1273151	Upload Photo	Q26562930
Science Block	II	Marlborough College			28 January 1971	SU1829168640; 51°24′59″N 1°44′18″W		1273152	Upload Photo	Q26562931
C House	I	Marlborough College			18 July 1949	SU1848468684; 51°25′01″N 1°44′08″W		1273163	C House More images	Q1902016
B House	II	Marlborough College			21 October 1974	SU1850568753; 51°25′03″N 1°44′07″W		1365436	Upload Photo	Q26647129
Children's Convalescent Home, Including Boundary Wall And Gates	II	Marlborough Common			21 October 1974	SU1846269592; 51°25′30″N 1°44′09″W		1243007	Upload Photo	Q26535723
13, New Road	II	13, New Road			21 October 1974	SU1892869193; 51°25′17″N 1°43′45″W		1243031	Upload Photo	Q26535745
Masonic Hall	II	Oxford Street			21 October 1974	SU1898069216; 51°25′18″N 1°43′42″W		1243032	Upload Photo	Q26535746
4 and 5, Oxford Street	II	4 and 5, Oxford Street			21 October 1974	SU1897169217; 51°25′18″N 1°43′43″W		1273100	Upload Photo	Q26562883
6 and 7, Oxford Street	II	6 and 7, Oxford Street			21 October 1974	SU1896969232; 51°25′18″N 1°43′43″W		1273068	Upload Photo	Q26562853
2-4, Pewsey Road	II	2-4, Pewsey Road			21 October 1974	SU1859668728; 51°25′02″N 1°44′02″W		1243099	Upload Photo	Q26535804
Church of St George	II*	Preshute, Manton Village			18 July 1949	SU1798268574; 51°24′57″N 1°44′34″W		1243100	Upload Photo	Q17543791
The Old Forge	II	Preshute			21 October 1974	SU1729868588; 51°24′58″N 1°45′10″W		1273000	Upload Photo	Q26562791
Preshute House	II	Preshute			21 October 1974	SU1796568500; 51°24′55″N 1°44′35″W		1273044	Upload Photo	Q26562832
Preshute War Memorial	II	Preshute Lane, Manton, SN8 4HQ			5 February 2018	SU1800468567; 51°24′57″N 1°44′33″W		1452276	Upload Photo	Q66479256
3, Riding School Yard	II	3, Riding School Yard			21 October 1974	SU1882969067; 51°25′13″N 1°43′50″W		1273045	Upload Photo	Q26562833
Numbers 30 to 35 (consecutive) Including Railings	II	Saint Martins			21 October 1974	SU1921369413; 51°25′24″N 1°43′30″W		1243240	Upload Photo	Q26535927
6 and 7, Saint Martins	II	6 and 7, Saint Martins			21 October 1974	SU1905569357; 51°25′22″N 1°43′38″W		1243231	Upload Photo	Q26535918
8, Saint Martins	II	8, Saint Martins			21 October 1974	SU1906169361; 51°25′23″N 1°43′38″W		1272980	Upload Photo	Q26562773
9, Saint Martins	II	9, Saint Martins			21 October 1974	SU1906569364; 51°25′23″N 1°43′38″W		1243232	Upload Photo	Q26535919
10, Saint Martins	II	10, Saint Martins			18 July 1949	SU1907269369; 51°25′23″N 1°43′38″W		1243233	Upload Photo	Q26535920
11-18, Saint Martins	II	11-18, Saint Martins			21 October 1974	SU1909469381; 51°25′23″N 1°43′36″W		1243234	Upload Photo	Q26535921
19, Saint Martins	II	19, Saint Martins			21 October 1974	SU1913069402; 51°25′24″N 1°43′35″W		1243235	Upload Photo	Q26535922
20, Saint Martins	II	20, Saint Martins			21 October 1974	SU1913669404; 51°25′24″N 1°43′34″W		1243236	Upload Photo	Q26535923
21, Saint Martins	II	21, Saint Martins			21 October 1974	SU1913969409; 51°25′24″N 1°43′34″W		1243237	Upload Photo	Q26535924
Number 22 Including Railings in Front	II	22, Saint Martins			21 October 1974	SU1914369409; 51°25′24″N 1°43′34″W		1243238	Upload Photo	Q26535925
The Queens Head Inn	II	23, Saint Martins			18 July 1949	SU1915769415; 51°25′24″N 1°43′33″W		1272981	Upload Photo	Q26562774
24-28, Saint Martins	II	24-28, Saint Martins			21 October 1974	SU1916569422; 51°25′25″N 1°43′33″W		1272952	Upload Photo	Q26562749
Number 36 to 39 (consecutive) Including Railings	II	36-39, Saint Martins			21 October 1974	SU1918569399; 51°25′24″N 1°43′32″W		1243241	Upload Photo	Q26535928
Numbers 40 to 42 (consecutive) Including Railings	II	40-42, Saint Martins			21 October 1974	SU1916169387; 51°25′23″N 1°43′33″W		1243334	Upload Photo	Q26536017
51 and 52, Saint Martins	II	51 and 52, Saint Martins			18 July 1949	SU1905869336; 51°25′22″N 1°43′38″W		1272982	Upload Photo	Q26562775
Salisbury Road Lodge Gate	II	Salisbury Road			21 October 1974	SU1940668403; 51°24′52″N 1°43′20″W		1243340	Upload Photo	Q26536023
Linden Lodge	II	Salisbury Road			21 October 1974	SU1923168908; 51°25′08″N 1°43′29″W		1272926	Upload Photo	Q26562726
Wall in Front of Linden Lodge	II	Salisbury Road			21 October 1974	SU1924768910; 51°25′08″N 1°43′29″W		1272983	Upload Photo	Q26562776
Railings At Rosetree Rosetree	II	Silverless Street			18 July 1949	SU1893169312; 51°25′21″N 1°43′45″W		1243381	Upload Photo	Q26536062
1, Silverless Street	II	1, Silverless Street			21 October 1974	SU1888369274; 51°25′20″N 1°43′47″W		1243377	Upload Photo	Q26536058
42, Kingsbury Street	II	1a, Silverless Street			21 October 1974	SU1887569270; 51°25′20″N 1°43′48″W		1273330	Upload Photo	Q26563083
2, 3 and 3a, Silverless Street	II	2, 3 and 3a, Silverless Street			21 October 1974	SU1888969278; 51°25′20″N 1°43′47″W		1243378	Upload Photo	Q26536059
4, Silverless Street	II	4, Silverless Street			21 October 1974	SU1889969284; 51°25′20″N 1°43′47″W		1243379	Upload Photo	Q26536060
5, Silverless Street	II	5, Silverless Street			21 October 1974	SU1890569286; 51°25′20″N 1°43′46″W		1272909	Upload Photo	Q26562710
Greenways	II	6, Silverless Street			21 October 1974	SU1891569291; 51°25′20″N 1°43′46″W		1243420	Upload Photo	Q26536099
7, Silverless Street	II	7, Silverless Street			18 July 1949	SU1892169295; 51°25′20″N 1°43′45″W		1243380	Upload Photo	Q26536061
Number 8 Including Railings	II	8, Silverless Street			21 October 1974	SU1892369307; 51°25′21″N 1°43′45″W		1243575	Upload Photo	Q26536243
9-11, Silverless Street	II	9-11, Silverless Street			18 July 1949	SU1893469283; 51°25′20″N 1°43′45″W		1243382	Upload Photo	Q26536063
13 and 14, Silverless Street	II	13 and 14, Silverless Street			18 July 1949	SU1891869277; 51°25′20″N 1°43′46″W		1243580	Upload Photo	Q26536248
15, Silverless Street	II	15, Silverless Street			21 October 1974	SU1890869270; 51°25′20″N 1°43′46″W		1272917	Upload Photo	Q26562718
Church Cottage	II	17, Silverless Street			21 October 1974	SU1889069263; 51°25′19″N 1°43′47″W		1272808	Upload Photo	Q26562616
18, Silverless Street	II	18, Silverless Street			21 October 1974	SU1888069258; 51°25′19″N 1°43′48″W		1243383	Upload Photo	Q26536064
K6 Telephone Kiosk Opposite Number 7 The Green, St Martin's	II	St Martins			25 January 1989	SU1902569335; 51°25′22″N 1°43′40″W		1243612	Upload Photo	Q26536279
Little Thatch	II	Stonbridge Lane			21 October 1974	SU1925369391; 51°25′24″N 1°43′28″W		1243593	Upload Photo	Q26536261
1a, The Green	II	1a, The Green			21 October 1974	SU1894069312; 51°25′21″N 1°43′44″W		1034276	Upload Photo	Q26285810
1, The Green	II*	1, The Green			18 July 1949	SU1894969318; 51°25′21″N 1°43′44″W		1262007	Upload Photo	Q17544208
2, 3 And 4, The Green And Railings	II	2-4, The Green			18 July 1949	SU1896969329; 51°25′22″N 1°43′43″W		1034277	Upload Photo	Q26285811
5 The Green	II	5, The Green			18 July 1949	SU1899569347; 51°25′22″N 1°43′42″W		1365403	Upload Photo	Q26647097
Number 8 Including Railings in Front	II	8, The Green			21 October 1974	SU1904469321; 51°25′21″N 1°43′39″W		1253045	Upload Photo	Q26544850
9, The Green	II	9, The Green			21 October 1974	SU1905669311; 51°25′21″N 1°43′38″W		1034278	Upload Photo	Q26285812
10, The Green	II	10, The Green			18 July 1949	SU1905969301; 51°25′21″N 1°43′38″W		1034279	Upload Photo	Q26285813
11, The Green	II	11, The Green			21 October 1974	SU1906369282; 51°25′20″N 1°43′38″W		1253055	Upload Photo	Q26544860
12, The Green	II	12, The Green			21 October 1974	SU1906169270; 51°25′20″N 1°43′38″W		1365404	Upload Photo	Q26647098
13, The Green	II	13, The Green			21 October 1974	SU1905769269; 51°25′20″N 1°43′38″W		1261961	Upload Photo	Q26552868
14, The Green	II	14, The Green			21 October 1974	SU1905269266; 51°25′20″N 1°43′39″W		1034280	Upload Photo	Q26285814
15 and 16, The Green	II	15 and 16, The Green			21 October 1974	SU1904469261; 51°25′19″N 1°43′39″W		1365367	Upload Photo	Q26647064
19-21, The Green	II	19-21, The Green			21 October 1974	SU1901369240; 51°25′19″N 1°43′41″W		1261967	Upload Photo	Q26552874
22, The Green	II	22, The Green			21 October 1974	SU1899969230; 51°25′18″N 1°43′41″W		1034281	Upload Photo	Q26285815
23 and 24, The Green	II	23 and 24, The Green			21 October 1974	SU1898369245; 51°25′19″N 1°43′42″W		1034236	Upload Photo	Q26285765
25-28, The Green	II	25-28, The Green			21 October 1974	SU1897269254; 51°25′19″N 1°43′43″W		1034237	Upload Photo	Q26285766
29, The Green And Railings	II	29, The Green			18 July 1949	SU1896569265; 51°25′19″N 1°43′43″W		1365424	Upload Photo	Q26647117
30-32, The Green	II	30-32, The Green			21 October 1974	SU1896069278; 51°25′20″N 1°43′43″W		1034238	Upload Photo	Q26285768
The Crown Hotel	II	The Parade			21 October 1974	SU1897069159; 51°25′16″N 1°43′43″W		1243042	The Crown Hotel More images	Q26535754
Boundary Wall, Rails, Piers, Gates And Overthrow To Street Of Congregational Chapel	II	The Parade			21 October 1974	SU1898569127; 51°25′15″N 1°43′42″W		1243159	Upload Photo	Q26535856
Congregational Chapel	II	The Parade			21 October 1974	SU1895969113; 51°25′15″N 1°43′43″W		1273067	Upload Photo	Q26562852
1 and 2, The Parade	II	1 and 2, The Parade			21 October 1974	SU1893269185; 51°25′17″N 1°43′45″W		1273065	Upload Photo	Q26562850
3 and 4, The Parade	II	3 and 4, The Parade			21 October 1974	SU1894269176; 51°25′17″N 1°43′44″W		1243037	Upload Photo	Q26535750
8 and 9, The Parade	II	8 and 9, The Parade			21 October 1974	SU1898769154; 51°25′16″N 1°43′42″W		1243088	Upload Photo	Q26535795
10 and 11, The Parade	II	10 and 11, The Parade			21 October 1974	SU1899969151; 51°25′16″N 1°43′41″W		1273074	Upload Photo	Q26562858
13, The Parade	II	13, The Parade			21 October 1974	SU1901169151; 51°25′16″N 1°43′41″W		1243050	Upload Photo	Q26535760
16 and 17, The Parade	II	16 and 17, The Parade			21 October 1974	SU1904069150; 51°25′16″N 1°43′39″W		1243053	Upload Photo	Q26535763
18, The Parade	II	18, The Parade			21 October 1974	SU1905069152; 51°25′16″N 1°43′39″W		1243094	Upload Photo	Q26535800
Katharine House	II	20, The Parade			18 July 1949	SU1901769103; 51°25′14″N 1°43′40″W		1243097	Upload Photo	Q26535802
24, The Parade	II	24, The Parade			21 October 1974	SU1896969138; 51°25′15″N 1°43′43″W		1243098	Upload Photo	Q26535803
28-30, The Parade	II	28-30, The Parade			21 October 1974	SU1893269160; 51°25′16″N 1°43′45″W		1273043	Upload Photo	Q26562831
1-8, Wellington Place	II	1-8, Wellington Place			21 October 1974	SU1868068856; 51°25′06″N 1°43′58″W		1272918	Upload Photo	Q26562719
Parish Church of St Mary	I				18 July 1949	SU1891969244; 51°25′19″N 1°43′45″W		1034302	Parish Church of St Mary More images	Q17529357
Gatepiers, Gates And Railings Running As Far As West Of Chapel, With Extension South Abutting Chapel	II				21 October 1974	SU1834968778; 51°25′04″N 1°44′15″W		1259059	Upload Photo	Q26550220
7Th Battalion, Wiltshire Regiment War Memorial	II	SN8 2AP			5 December 2016	SU1926768962; 51°25′10″N 1°43′28″W		1437433	Upload Photo	Q66477827
Marlborough War Memorial	II	SN8 1PW			5 December 2016	SU1904569186; 51°25′17″N 1°43′39″W		1437470	Marlborough War Memorial More images	Q66477837

== See also ==
- Grade I listed buildings in Wiltshire
- Grade II* listed buildings in Wiltshire

== Sources ==
- Orbach, Julian; Pevsner, Nikolaus; Cherry, Bridget (2021), Wiltshire, The Buildings of England, New Haven and London: Yale University Press, ISBN 978-0-300-25120-3
