= Clan Wemyss =

Lowland Scottish clan

- Motto: Je pense (I think)

Chief
- Michael Wemyss of that Ilk
- Seat: Wemyss Castle

Clan Wemyss is a Lowland Scottish clan.

== History ==
=== Origins of the clan ===
The surname Wemyss is derived from the Scottish Gaelic uaimh which means cave. It is believed to be taken from the caves of the Wemyss, Fife, by the Firth of Forth, where the Wemyss family made their home. Wemyss Castle in Fife has been the seat of the chiefs of Clan Wemyss since the twelfth century. The chiefs are one of the few noble families who are descended from the Celtic nobility through the Clan MacDuff Earls of Fife.

Sir Michael Wemyss along with his brother, Sir David, and also Scott of Balwearie were sent to Norway to bring back the infant Queen Margaret, the "Maid of Norway", in 1290.

=== Wars of Scottish Independence ===
Sir Michael Wemyss swore fealty to Edward I of England in 1296 but then changed his allegiance to Robert the Bruce. As a result, Wemyss Castle was sacked by the English. He also witnessed the Act of Settlement in 1315 of the Scottish Crown by Robert the Bruce. Michael's son, Sir David Wemyss, was amongst those who appended their seals to the famous Declaration of Arbroath in 1320. Sir David was also one of the guarantors for the release of David II of Scotland from English imprisonment and his son was one of the hostages sent for the king's ransom.

=== 16th century and Anglo-Scottish Wars ===
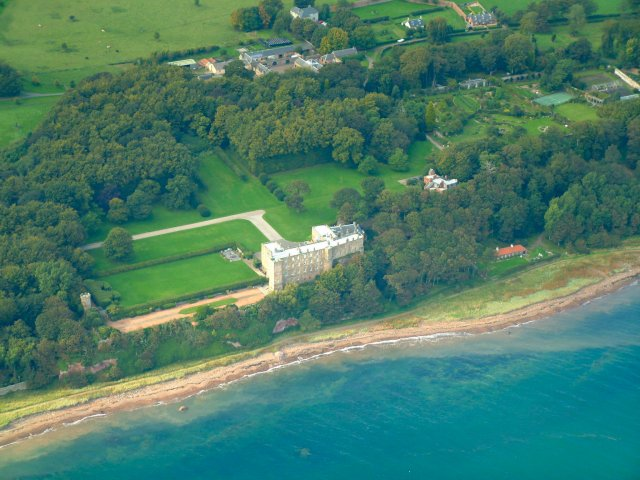
Wemyss Castle, seat of the chiefs of Clan Wemyss since the twelfth century.

In 1513 Chief Sir David de Wemyss was killed leading the Clan Wemyss at the Battle of Flodden. His grandson was Sir John Wemyss who fought under the Earl of Arran at the Battle of Pinkie Cleugh in 1547.

John was a great supporter of Mary, Queen of Scots, and it was at the newly enlarged Wemyss Castle that she first met her future husband, Henry Stuart, Lord Darnley. Sir John was made lieutenant of Fife, Kinross and Clackmannan in 1559. He led his men in the queen's army at the Battle of Langside in 1568. His great-grandson was another John Wemyss who was born in 1586 as second-born, but eldest-surviving son of Sir John Wemyss of that Ilk, by his second wife Mary Stewart.

=== 17th and 18th centuries ===
John Wemyss was knighted in 1618 and created a Baronet of Nova Scotia in 1625. This included a charter to the barony of New Wemyss in that province of Canada. He was later advanced to the title of Earl of Wemyss and the patent was presented to him at Dunfermline personally by Charles I of England. John Wemyss was also a Privy Councillor, High Commissioner to the General Assembly of the Church of Scotland, and one of the Committee of the Estates. John Wemyss died in 1649 and was succeeded by his only son, David Wemyss, 2nd Earl of Wemyss. David Wemyss, the second earl spent a lifetime nurturing the resources of his estate, in particular his salt and coal mines. He also built a large harbour at Methil, Fife and greatly extended Wemyss Castle where he entertained Charles II of England in 1650 and 1651. He died in 1679 and was predeceased by his son so the estates fell to his daughter, Margaret Wemyss, 3rd Countess of Wemyss. Margaret married her cousin, James Wemyss, Lord Burntisland. Their son was David Wemyss, 4th Earl of Wemyss who succeeded his mother in 1705.

==== Jacobite risings ====
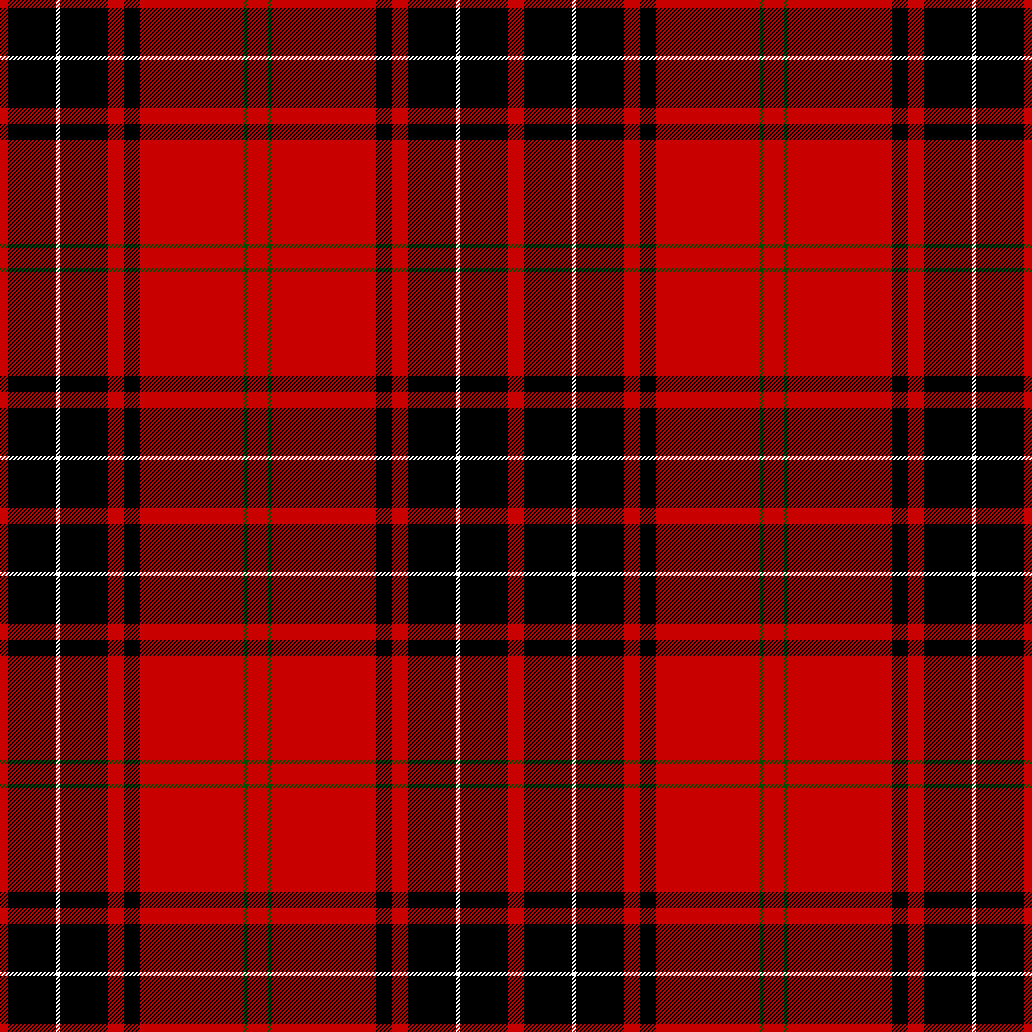
Clan Wemyss tartan as published in Vestiarium Scoticum in 1842.

David Wemyss, 4th Earl of Wemyss was nominated as one of the trustees for the Treaty of Union with England. In 1707 he became Vice Admiral of Scotland.

James Wemyss, 5th Earl of Wemyss married the heiress of Colonel Francis Charles Charteris. During the Jacobite rising of 1745 the earl's son, David Wemyss, Lord Elcho, joined the Jacobite leader, Charles Edward Stuart in Edinburgh. Lord Elcho accompanied Stuart into England and was also present at the Battle of Culloden. He then escaped to France and took part in Charles Edward Stuart's state entry into Paris. In his absence he was convicted of treason and his estates were forfeited to the Crown. He died in Paris in 1787. Consequently, the earl was instead succeeded by his second son, Francis, who changed his surname to that of his mother which was Charteris. It is from Francis that the present Earls of Wemyss and chiefs of Clan Charteris are descended. Meanwhile, the chiefship of the Clan Wemyss and the estates in Fife devolved upon the 5th earl's third son, James Wemyss (1726–1786), who was MP for Sutherland and married Lady Elizabeth Sutherland in 1757.

=== Modern history ===
James Wemyss's great-grandson married Millicent, daughter of Lady Augusta Gordon, and illegitimate granddaughter of William IV of the United Kingdom. Their grandson, Michael Wemyss, married Lady Victoria Cavendish-Bentinck, last surviving god-daughter of Queen Victoria.

== Castles ==
- Wemyss Castle in Fife is still the principal seat of the chief of Clan Wemyss.
- Elcho Castle is owned by the Wemyss Lord Elcho.

== Clan Chief ==
As of 2011 the chief of Clan Wemyss is Michael Wemyss of Wemyss (a grandson of Michael Erskine-Wemyss) who married Charlotte Bristowe, the daughter of Colonel Royle Bristowe of Ickleton, Essex.

== Clan Septs ==
Spelling variations and septs of the Clan Wemyss include: Elcho, Vemis, Vemys, Vemyss, Veymis, Weemes, Weems, Weemyss, Weimes, Weimis, Weims, Weimys, Wemes, Wemeth, Wemis, Wemise, Wems, Wemyes, Wemys, Wemyss, Wemysse, Weymes, Weymis, Weyms, Whymes, Whyms, Wymes, Wymess, Whims, Wims, and Wymbs (County Sligo, Ireland),

== See also ==
- Wemyss
- Scottish clan
