= Elcho Castle =

Castle in Perth and Kinross, Scotland

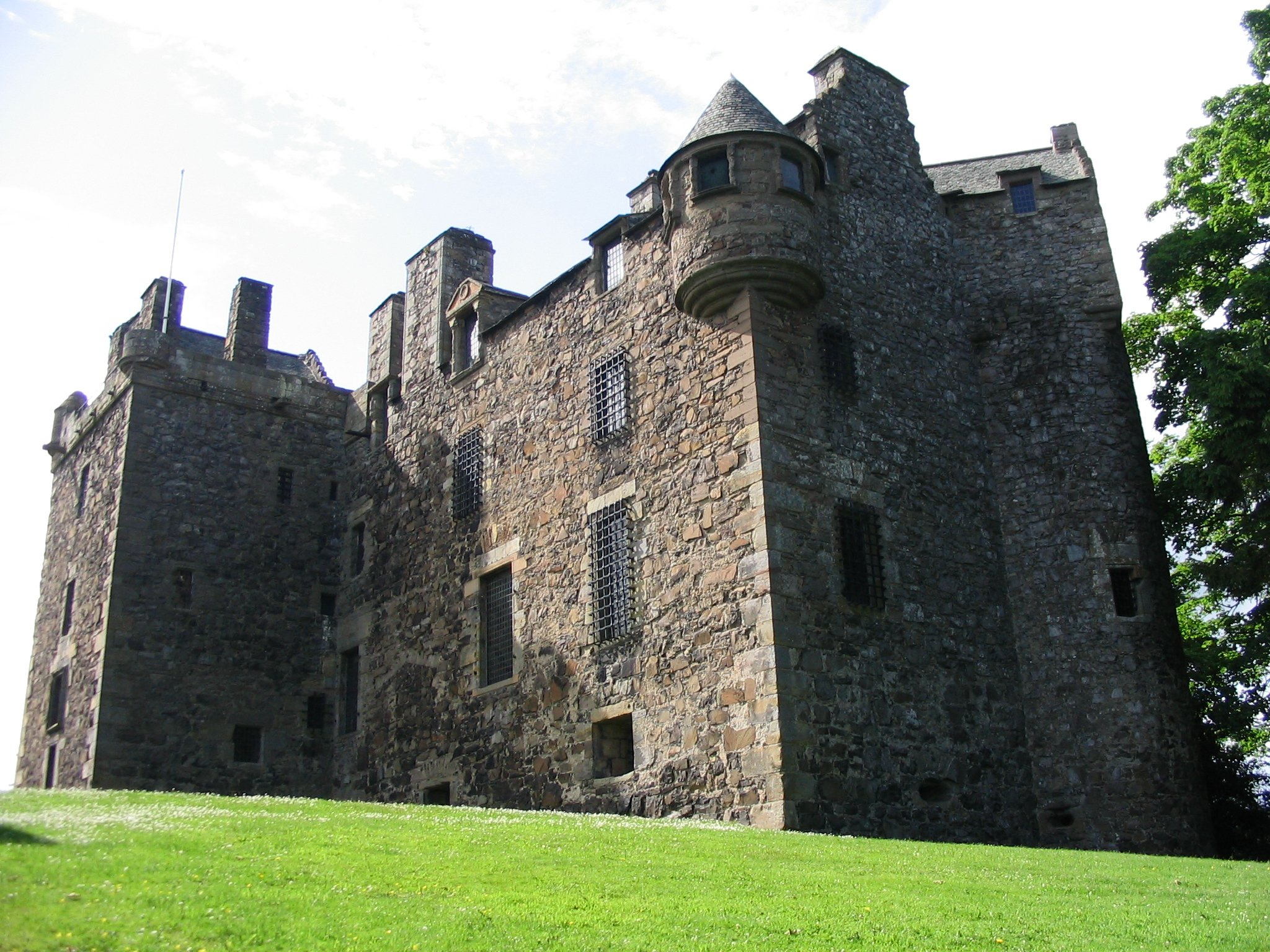
- The front of Elcho Castle
- Interactive map of Elcho Castle
- 56.3746°N 3.3545°W

History
- Built: Around 1560

Scheduled monument
- Official name: Elcho Castle
- Type: Secular: castle
- Designated: 30 April 1920
- Reference no.: SM90140

Listed Building – Category A
- Official name: Elcho Castle, Doo'cot
- Designated: 5 October 1971
- Reference no.: LB17714

Listed Building – Category C(S)
- Official name: Elcho Castle, Custodian's House
- Designated: 5 October 1971
- Reference no.: LB17713

Elcho Castle (/ˈɛl.xoʊ/) is located close to the south bank of the River Tay approximately four miles south-east of Perth, Scotland, in the region of Perth and Kinross. It was maintained by Clan Wemyss from its construction around 1560 until it was put into the care of the Secretary of State for Scotland in the early 20th century, though was not occupied for the entire time. In around 1830 it was re-roofed and a nearby cottage constructed. The castle has been a scheduled monument since 1920 on the grounds of being "a particularly fine example of a Medieval tower-house", and the cottage became a listed building in 1971 in recognition of its national importance. The castle is unusual in that it has both en suite guest accommodation like a mansion, but also a large number of gun loops.

== Description ==
Elcho Castle consists of an approximately Z-plan tower house, with evidence of a surrounding wall (a barmkin). It is a multi-storied structure with a large square tower at one corner, and three other integrated towers on the north-side. Some of the windows have metal grilles for defence, and 17 gun loops are present at the lower levels. There is only a single entrance to the castle, located at ground-level in the south-west tower, and is protected by a yett. There is a walk-way on top of the walls, with a parapet, though as with the south-eastern corbelled turret featuring large windows, it was thought to be more for inhabitants to view the surrounds than the defence. The castle was built with stone rubble and dressed sandstone. The walls would have been harled, but only small patches have survived. One of the dormer windows on the south side features an annulet (sometimes used as a cadency to represent a fifth son).

The first floor (known as the "noble floor") primarily consists of the main hall, which was lit by south-facing windows, and great bedchamber which also acted as a private reception room with a small side room and en suite latrine. The upper floors were large for the time, and included multiple smaller rooms with roof-top walkways. It also includes a "guest wing" with their own latrines, which is unusual. There is a large turnpike staircase to the first floor, with additional staircases to the upper floors. The ground floor (known as "below stairs") was vaulted, with a large kitchen, fireplace, and cellars. A long corridor connected the lower rooms. A smaller staircase gave servants direct access to the floor above without needing to use the main staircase.

A quarry nearby had been flooded and used a private dock on the river with what was thought to be a 19th-century jetty, though it is now the site of a garden. The surrounding wall would have enclosed ancillary buildings, but not much has survived beyond the ruin of a small round tower in the south-east corner, which also featured a gun port.

== History ==
The first reliable record of the Elcho was in 1429, when Sir David Wemyss of Clan Wemyss and Hugh Fraser made an agreement at "Elthok". Blind Harry's 1480s poem about William Wallace over 150 years earlier, The Wallace, refers to "Elchoch", but it is not thought by Historic Environment Scotland to be a reliable source. In 1468 James III of Scotland confirmed that ownership of the east Elcho lands went to Sir David's son, John Wemyss, as recorded in The Register of the Great Seal. There is a reference in 1501 to "place of Elchok", and in 1541 to "capitale messuagium de Elquhoch".

Sir John Wemyss assisted the nearby Elcho Nunnery in west Elcho some time after 1547 by providing barley and funding. Areas of land were leased to Wemyss and by 1560 eventually all the lands of Elcho were in Wemyss family hands. The current castle was built on the site of an older structure about 1560. The main seat of Clan Wemyss was Wemyss Castle in Fife with Elcho castle being more of a country retreat. Sir John died in 1571 and his son David took possession of the castle. Sir David was involved in the wedding planning of James VI and I and Anne of Denmark in 1589.

In 1628 a descendant of Sir John, also called John became the first Lord Wemyss of Elcho in 1628, and then Earl of Wemyss, Lord Elcho and Methil in 1633 by Charles I, and decorative plasterwork was added to the hall of the castle in celebration. The letters "E I W" are carved outside near the door, thought to stand for "Earl James Wemyss". Sir John died in 1649, the same year Charles was executed. His only son, David Wemyss, 2nd Earl of Wemyss, become the subsequent Lord Elcho, though lived at Wemyss Castle. He died in 1697 without a male heir and his titles passed to Margaret Wemyss, 3rd Countess of Wemyss. She was succeeded by her son, David Wemyss, 4th Earl of Wemyss.

Following the death of David, his son James Wemyss, 5th Earl of Wemyss became the next earl. James' eldest son, David Wemyss, was heavily involved with the Jacobite rising of 1745 and escaped to France and lost his titles. The castle was sold in 1749 by James to his second son, Francis Wemyss-Charteris, who had also taken his maternal grandfather's name.

The castle was not involved in any military action, but was nearly burned in 1773 when it was being used as a grain store during a famine. Grain was being stored for export to fetch higher prices, and soldiers had to prevent a riot. The grain was subsequently sold on the open market in Perth. After this incident the castle was abandoned.

An engraving of Elcho castle was done by James Fittler in 1804. It is part of Scotia Depicta, which is now held at National Library of Scotland. The castle was re-roofed in 1830 by Francis Douglas, 8th Earl of Wemyss in order to preserve it. Few other modifications were done to the castle itself since it was first built. In around 1830 a single-storey cottage with attic was built, thought to have been constructed from material from the courtyard wall. It also has a log column porch.

== 20th and 21st century ==
The property is still owned by the family of the original builders, the Wemyss family, though it has not been inhabited for some 200 years. It has nevertheless been kept in good repair – one of the earliest examples in Scotland of a building being preserved purely for its historical interest. It is managed by Historic Environment Scotland as a scheduled monument since 30 April 1920 in recognition of its national importance and guardianship of it was given to the state in 1929 by Hugo Charteris, 11th Earl of Wemyss.

A 16th-century 'beehive' doo'cot (Scots for dovecote) survives nearby. The dovecote became a Category A listed building in October 1971, whilst the early 19th century custodian's house became Category C. Approximately 90 fruit trees, primarily apple and pear, were planted in the orchard adjoining the castle in 1999. In 2001 the ceremony of sasine was carried out, in which David Charteris, 12th Earl of Wemyss passed ownership of the castle to his grandson, Richard Charteris.

Excavation work was carried out a number of times, including in 1987, 2006 and 2012. Some improvements works were carried out in the late 2010s, which included roof repairs, a bench and paved area, and a new path and electrical work. In 2019 Elcho Castle was a destination of the River Tay water taxis.

A survey was carried out in 2021 on all 96 windows and window openings as part of conservation work by Linda Cannon. In 2022 it was reported that the castle would be further assessed by Historic Environment Scotland as part of a national programme. A large portion of the Castle is accessible, but a lot of the wooden floor of the third level in the main block is missing. It is normally open to the public 1 April to 30 September from 10am to 4pm, but as of 2022 access is restricted and there is no public access whilst the conservation work is being carried out.

== Gallery ==
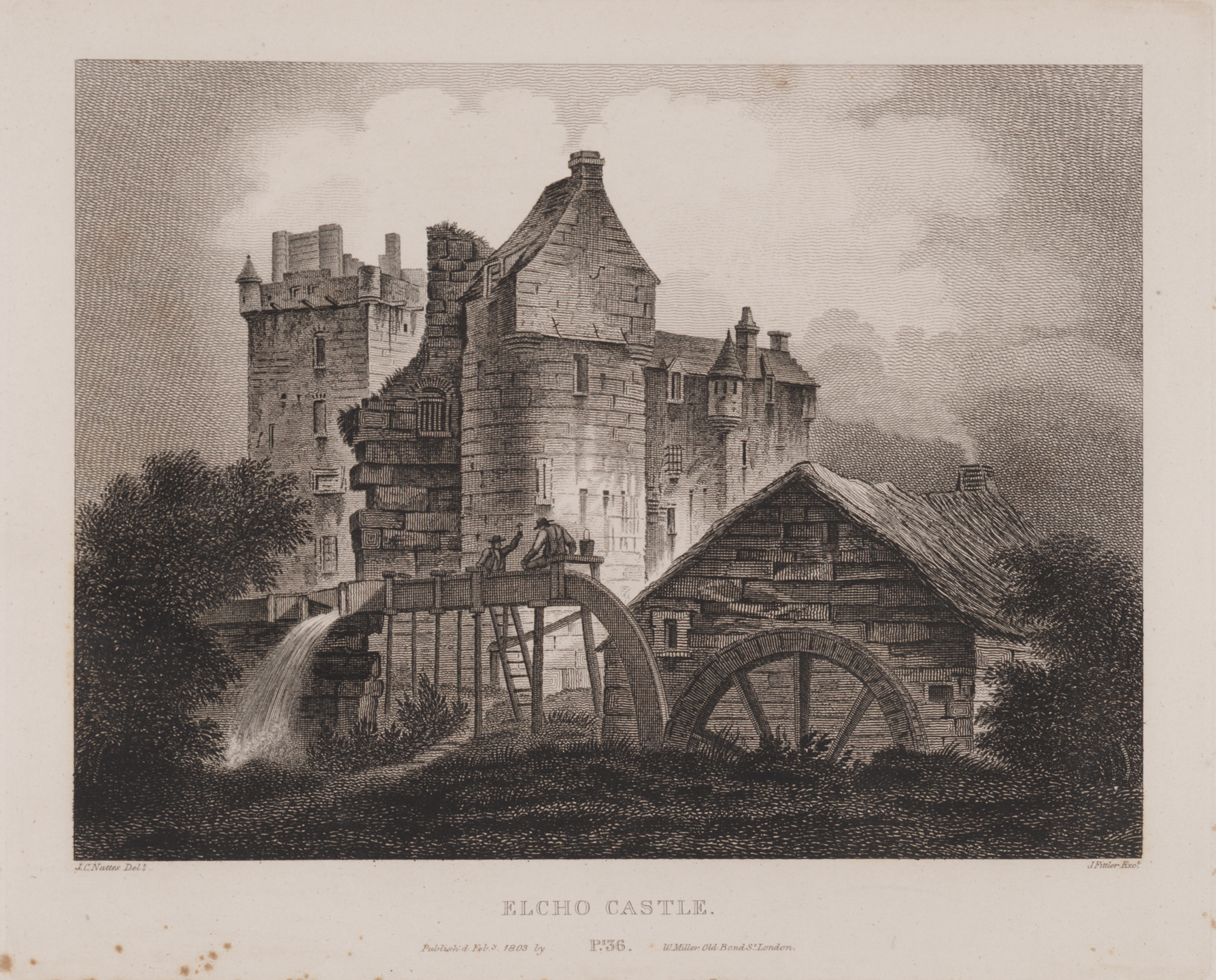
Engraving of Elcho Castle by James Fittler in Scotia Depicta published 1804

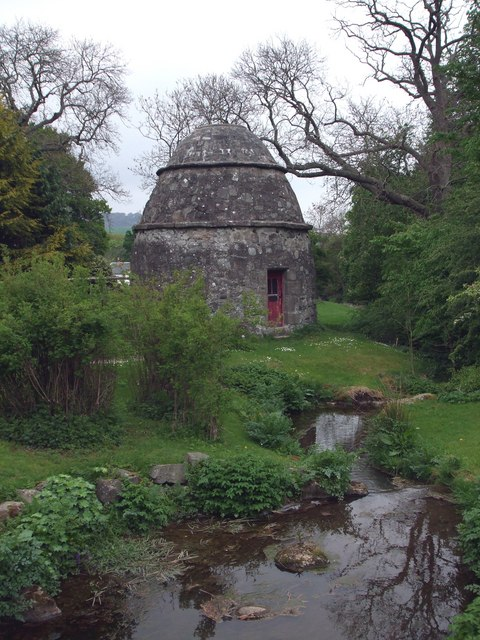
Doo'cot at Elcho Castle

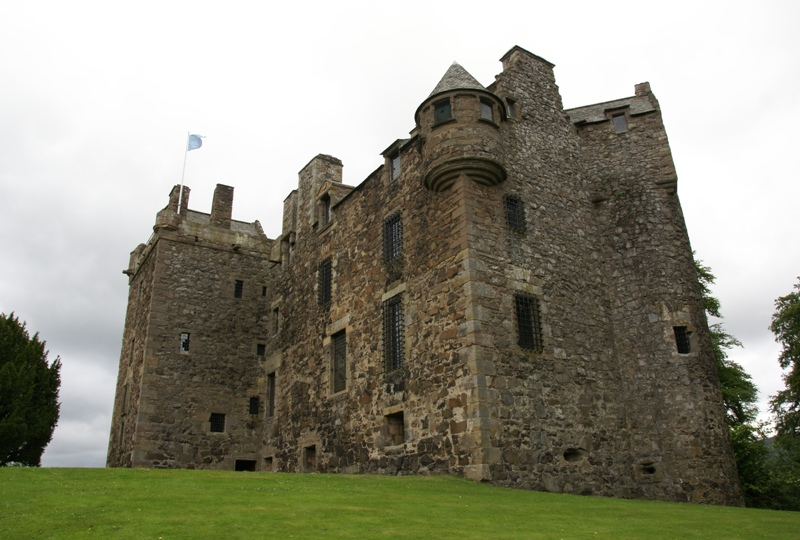
View of Elcho Castle from the east

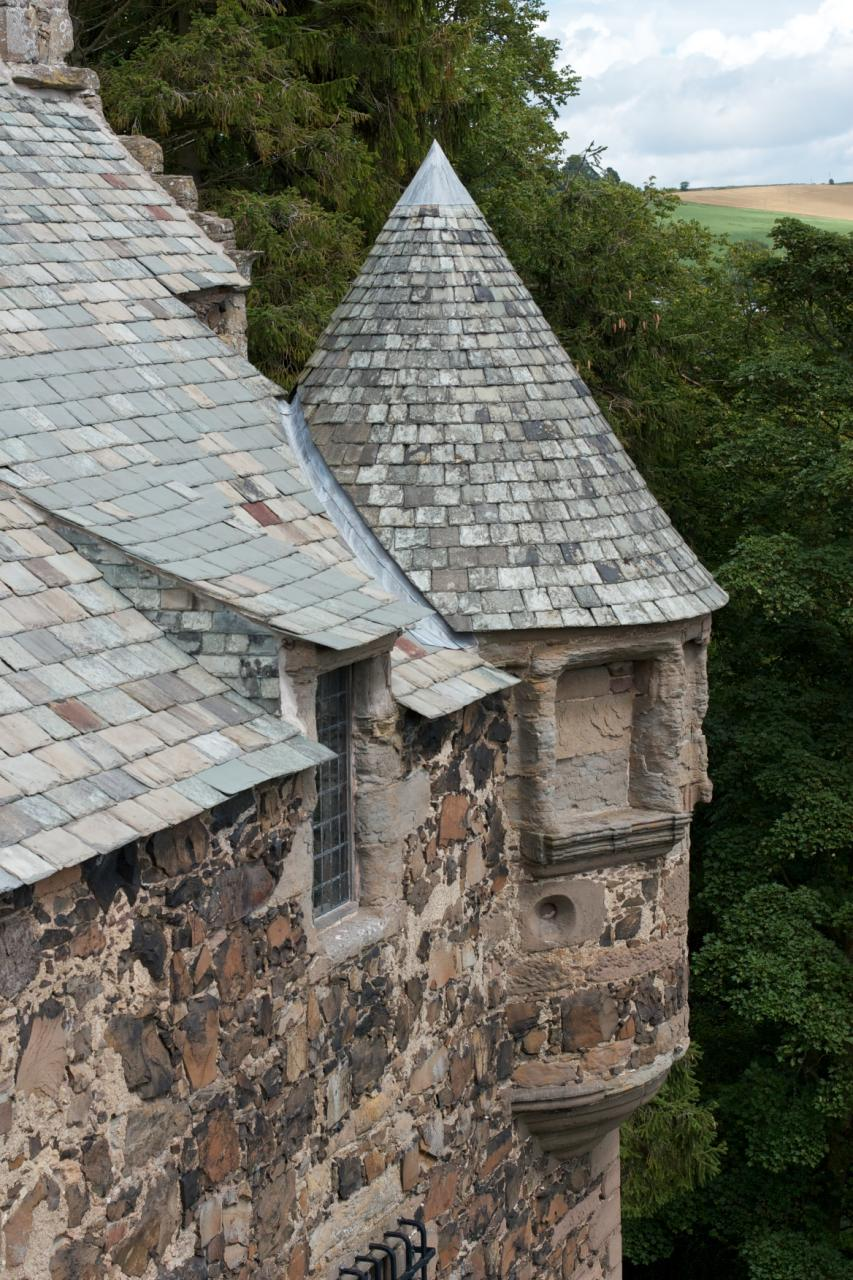
Corner of Elcho Castle

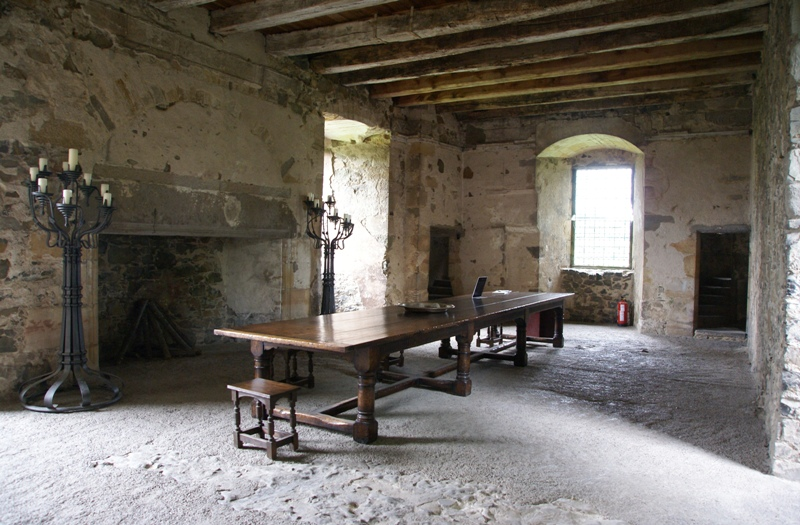
Interior of Elcho Castle

== See also ==
- Elcho Priory
- Elcho, Wisconsin
- Elcho Shield
- Wallace's Well
