= Amisfield House =

Palladian mansion

Coordinates: 55.9581°N 2.7565°W

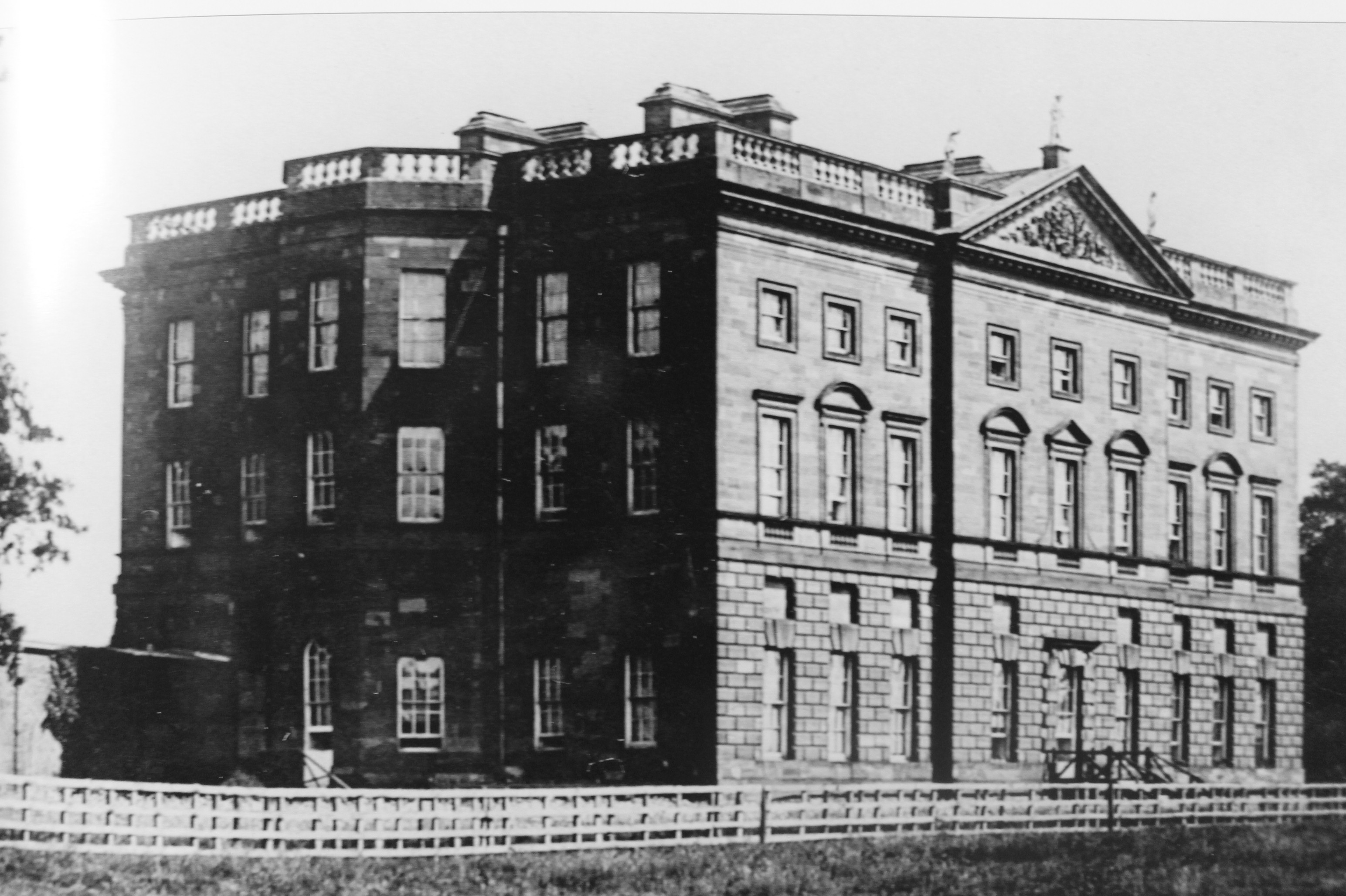
South facade of Amisfield House c.1900

Amisfield House was a substantial Palladian mansion near Haddington, East Lothian.

== History ==
Previously known as Newmills, under that name in the 17th century, the previous estate was the site of the murder of Sir James Stanfield, whose family had come to Scotland after the Union of 1606. In November 1687 Sir James was found dead in the pond on the estate. At first thought to have been drowned, an autopsy in a local church by Edinburgh surgeons showed that he had been strangled. As the family prepared to re-bury the corpse, his nephew Philip Stanfield handled the corpse, and was aghast when the body spilt blood onto both his hands. In those days of widespread belief in witchcraft, this was interpreted as a sign of guilt. Philip was put on trial at the High Court in Edinburgh on 7 February 1688. Despite any clear evidence he was found guilty. His execution by hanging, and failing that by strangulation, was extremely grisly, and his corpse was publicly displayed and abused.

The land was later purchased by Lady Anne Douglas, and she changed the name of Newmilns to Amisfield after her ancestral home Amisfield Tower in Dumfriesshire. An original (smaller) estate house was built on the East Lothian estate, east of Haddington, around 1700.

The 18th century house was the creation of Francis Charteris, second son of James Wemyss, 5th Earl of Wemyss. The family became estranged from much of Scottish society when his elder brother, David, Lord Elcho chose to back the Jacobite cause, and Bonnie Prince Charlie and, as a result of the Jacobite defeat at the Battle of Culloden in 1746 David was ineligible to inherit the estate and on the death of the 6th Earl in 1756 Francis was instead the heir. Having done a "Grand Tour" of Europe, he chose to rebuild the old house at Amisfield in the Palladian style. He commissioned the English architect Isaac Ware to design the house, due to his skill in the Palladian style. It faced north onto the River Tyne but had a formal south frontage facing the garden and broader estate. The walled garden (with cylindrical corner towers) was created in 1758 by John Henderson.

Charteris commissioned architect John Henderson (d.1786) in 1784 to update some interiors and add some features in the landscape. Most importantly, it was Henderson who added the continuous balustrade around the perimeter of the roof, and adding curved ramps in place of steps on the north frontage. Plasterwork dating from 1784 included work by James Nisbet in the dining room and other principal rooms. Henderson was also commissioned to create architectural features in the walled garden and other buildings around the estate (see below).

While works progressed Charteris relocated to a newly purchased estate: Gosford House on the Firth of Forth, which he enjoyed the additional pleasure of a nearby golf links. When Amisfield was ready, he commissioned Robert Adam to remodel Gosford.

Francis Charteris died in 1808 (and was buried on his Gosford estate). The estate then passed to his eldest son, Francis Charteris (1749-1808). The family vacillated between Gosford and Amisfield until 1883 when the treasures of Amisfield were transferred to Gosford. The family rented the house for some years, but the vast house was beyond almost all, and the house went into decline.

Amisfield was abandoned in 1925 and demolished 1928/9. The Edinburgh architect Stewart Kaye was involved in making a photographic record of the house prior to demolition. The huge grounds of the house were partly used to create Amisfield Park and partly for Haddington Golf Club. The land closest to Haddington was used for new housing. The gardens (publicly accessible under the name Amisfield Park, and including Haddington Golf Club and the restored Amisfield Walled Garden, one of Scotland's largest walled gardens) remain substantially intact.

== Surviving elements ==
- Quoins from the original house re-used on Longniddry Golf club House in 1929
- Stable block by John Henderson (1785, remodelling a structure of c. 1700) east of where the house stood
- Walled garden by John Henderson (1783) now open to the public
- Gothic Folly south of garden (c.1820)
- Ice house on opposite side of river (c.1760)
- Temple, north-east of house by Isaac Ware (1756)
- Entrance gates and pair of lodges, possibly early 18th c. remodelled by Ware
- Amisfield Mains, farmhouse c.1810, with Gothic lodge facing the A1 c.1810
- Amisfield Mains farm cottages c.1830
