= Francis Charteris, Lord Elcho =

Scottish nobleman and politician

Personal details
- Born: Francis Wemyss Charteris; 30 January 1749
- Died: 20 January 1808 (aged 58)
- Parent: Francis Wemyss-Charteris (father)
- Occupation: Politician

Francis Wemyss Charteris, Lord Elcho (31 January 1749 – 20 January 1808) was a Scottish nobleman and member of parliament.

== Life ==
He was the only son of Francis Charteris, second son of James Wemyss, 5th Earl of Wemyss. The fifth Earl's eldest son David Wemyss, Lord Elcho had been attainted for his part in the Jacobite Rising of 1745 so after the Earl's death in 1756 the earldom became forfeit.

Charteris was elected to Parliament for the Haddington district of burghs in 1780. From 1784 he was in opposition to the government of William Pitt the Younger.

In 1787 Charteris' uncle Lord Elcho (who but for his attainder would have been 6th Earl of Wemyss) died. As Charteris' father had not been attainted himself, he assumed the title as 7th Earl of Wemyss, with Charteris himself assuming the subsidiary title Lord Elcho. At the time eldest sons of Scottish peers were not allowed to represent Scottish constituencies in Parliament, and after a debate on the matter Charteris had to vacate his seat. Although it was later established that the Earldom of Wemyss remained forfeit and his father was not after all a Scottish peer, Charteris did not attempt to re-enter Parliament.

Charteris died on 20 January 1808 at Amisfield House, East Lothian, and was interred at St Mary's Collegiate Church, Haddington.

== Marriage and issue ==
Francis Charteris married Susan Tracy in 1771, daughter of Anthony Keck and Susanna Keck, and granddaughter of James Hamilton, 4th Duke of Hamilton. Through this marriage Stanway House in Gloucestershire came into the possession of the Charteris family. They had one son and four daughters:

- Francis, who obtained a reversal of the attainder and became 8th Earl of Wemyss
- Henrietta Charlotte Elizabeth, who married George Harry Grey, 6th Earl of Stamford
- Susan, who married Sir Henry Clinton
- Katharine, who married Edward Richard Stewart
- Augusta, who married Warner Westenra, 2nd Baron Rossmore

Lady Elcho's Name Act 1818
- Act of Parliament
- Parliament of the United Kingdom
- Long title: An Act to enable The Right Honourable Susan Charteris, commonly called Dowager Lady Elcho, to take and use the Surname of Tracy, and to bear the Coat of Arms of the Name and Family of Tracy, pursuant to the Will of Robert Tracy Esquire, deceased.
- Citation: 58 Geo. 3. c. 66 Pr.

Dates
- Royal assent: 28 May 1818

In 1818—after Francis Chateris's death—his widow Susan Chateris (by then the Dowager Lady Elcho) changed her surname back to Tracy by a private act of Parliament, Lady Elcho's Name Act 1818 (58 Geo. 3. c. 66 Pr.), as a condition of inheriting her uncle Robert Tracy's estate, on the death of her elder sister.

Parliament of Great Britain
Preceded by John Maitland	Member of Parliament for Haddington Burghs; 1780–1787	Succeeded by William Fullarton
