= Earl of Wemyss =

Titles in the Peerage of Scotland

Earldom of Wemyss held with Earldom of March since 1826
- Quarterly: 1st & 4th argent, a fess, azure, within a double tressure, flory and counterflory, gules, for Charteris, 2nd and 3rd, Or, a lion rampant, gules, armed and langued azure, for Wemyss
- Creation date: 1633 (Earl of Wemyss); 1697 (Earl of March)
- Created by: Charles I and William III
- Peerage: Peerage of Scotland
- First holder: John Wemyss, 1st Earl of Wemyss; William Douglas, 1st Earl of March
- Present holder: James Charteris, 13th Earl of Wemyss and 9th Earl of March
- Heir apparent: Richard Charteris, Lord Elcho
- Remainder to: The 1st Earl's heirs male of the body lawfully begotten
- Subsidiary titles: Lord Elcho; Lord Neidpath; Viscount Peebles
- Seat: Gosford House
- Former seats: Amisfield House; Neidpath Castle; Elcho Castle
- Motto: Je Pense ("I think")

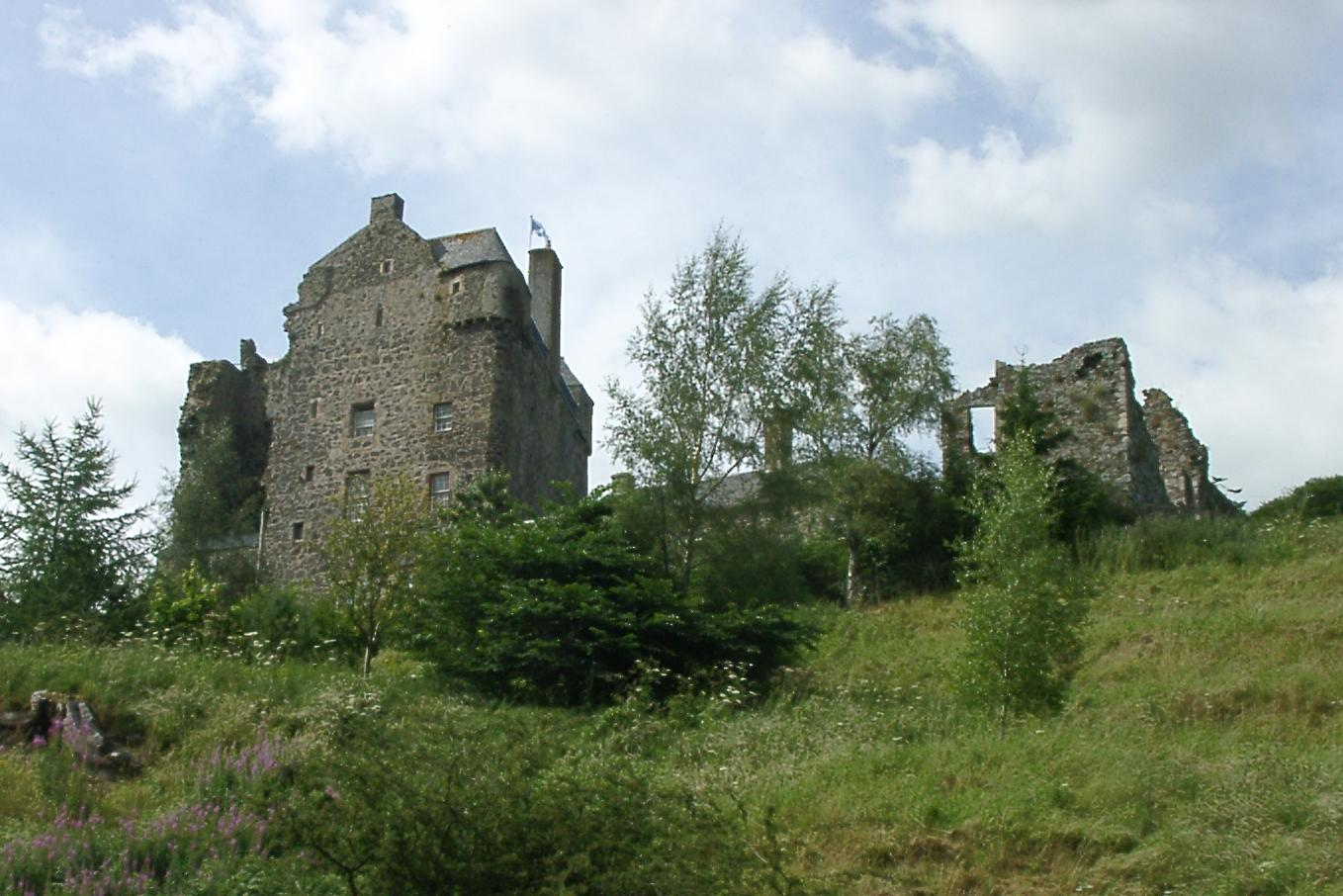
Neidpath Castle

Earl of Wemyss (/ˈwiːmz/ WEEMZ) is a title in the Peerage of Scotland created in 1633. The Scottish Wemyss family had possessed the lands of Wemyss in Fife since the 12th century. Since 1823 the earldom has been held with the Earldom of March, created in 1697. The holder of the title is sometimes known as the Earl of Wemyss and March, but the titles are distinct.

== History ==
In 1625 John Wemyss was created a Baronet, of Wemyss in the County of Fife, in the Baronetage of Nova Scotia. In 1628 he was raised to the Peerage of Scotland as Lord Wemyss of Elcho, and in 1633 he was further honoured when he was made Lord Elcho and Methel and Earl of Wemyss, also in the Peerage of Scotland. He later supported the Scottish parliament against Charles I, and died in 1649. He was succeeded by his son David, the second Earl.

In 1672 David resigned his peerages to the Crown in return for a new patent with original precedency and extending the limitation to his daughters. Lord Wemyss had no male issue and on his death in 1679 the baronetcy became extinct. He was succeeded in the peerages according to the new patent by his daughter Margaret, the third Countess of Wemyss. She married as her first husband her third cousin twice removed Sir James Wemyss, Lord Burntisland. He was the son of General Sir James Wemyss of Caskieberry, grandson of James Wemyss, younger brother of Sir John Wemyss, great-grandfather of the first Earl of Wemyss. She was succeeded by her son from her first marriage, David, the fourth Earl. He served as Lord High Admiral of Scotland and sat in the House of Lords as a Scottish representative peer from 1707 to 1710. Lord Wemyss married Lady Anne Douglas, daughter of William Douglas, 1st Duke of Queensberry and sister of William Douglas, 1st Earl of March (see below).

On his death the titles passed to his second but eldest surviving son James, the fifth Earl. He married the great heiress Janet Charteris, daughter of Colonel Francis Charteris, who had made a large fortune by gambling and was noted for the rape of Anne Bond. Their eldest son David, Lord Elcho, was implicated in the Jacobite rising of 1745, and was consequently attainted. On his father's death in 1756 he was not allowed to succeed to the peerages, but nonetheless assumed the title of Earl of Wemyss. Lord Elcho died childless and the peerages would have but for the attainder devolved upon his younger brother Francis, the soi disant seventh Earl, who nevertheless assumed the title. He assumed the surname of Charteris in lieu of Wemyss on being made heir his maternal grandfather Colonel Charteris's estate. His successor was his grandson Francis, the soi disant eighth Earl (the son of Francis Charteris, Lord Elcho).

In 1790 the family commissioned a large townhouse at 64 Queen Street, Edinburgh, a bay wider than the already large adjacent townhouses.

Baron Wemyss Restoration Act 1826
- Act of Parliament
- Parliament of the United Kingdom
- Long title: An Act to restore Francis Baron Wemyss and others from the Effects of the Attainder of David Wemyss, commonly called Lord Elcho.
- Citation: 7 Geo. 4. c. 49 Pr.

Dates
- Royal assent: 26 May 1826

In 1810, upon the death of William Douglas, 4th Duke of Queensberry and 3rd Earl of March, Francis Wemyss-Charteris succeeded as fourth Earl of March, fourth Viscount of Peebles and fourth Lord Douglas of Neidpath, Lyne and Munard as the lineal heir male of the aforementioned Lady Anne Douglas, sister of the first Earl of March (see below). On his accession to these titles he assumed the surname of Charteris-Wemyss-Douglas. In 1821 he was created Baron Wemyss, of Wemyss in the County of Fife, in the Peerage of the United Kingdom. In 1826 he also obtained a reversal of the attainder of the earldom of Wemyss via the Baron Wemyss Restoration Act 1826 (7 Geo. 4. c. 49 Pr.) and became the eighth Earl of Wemyss.

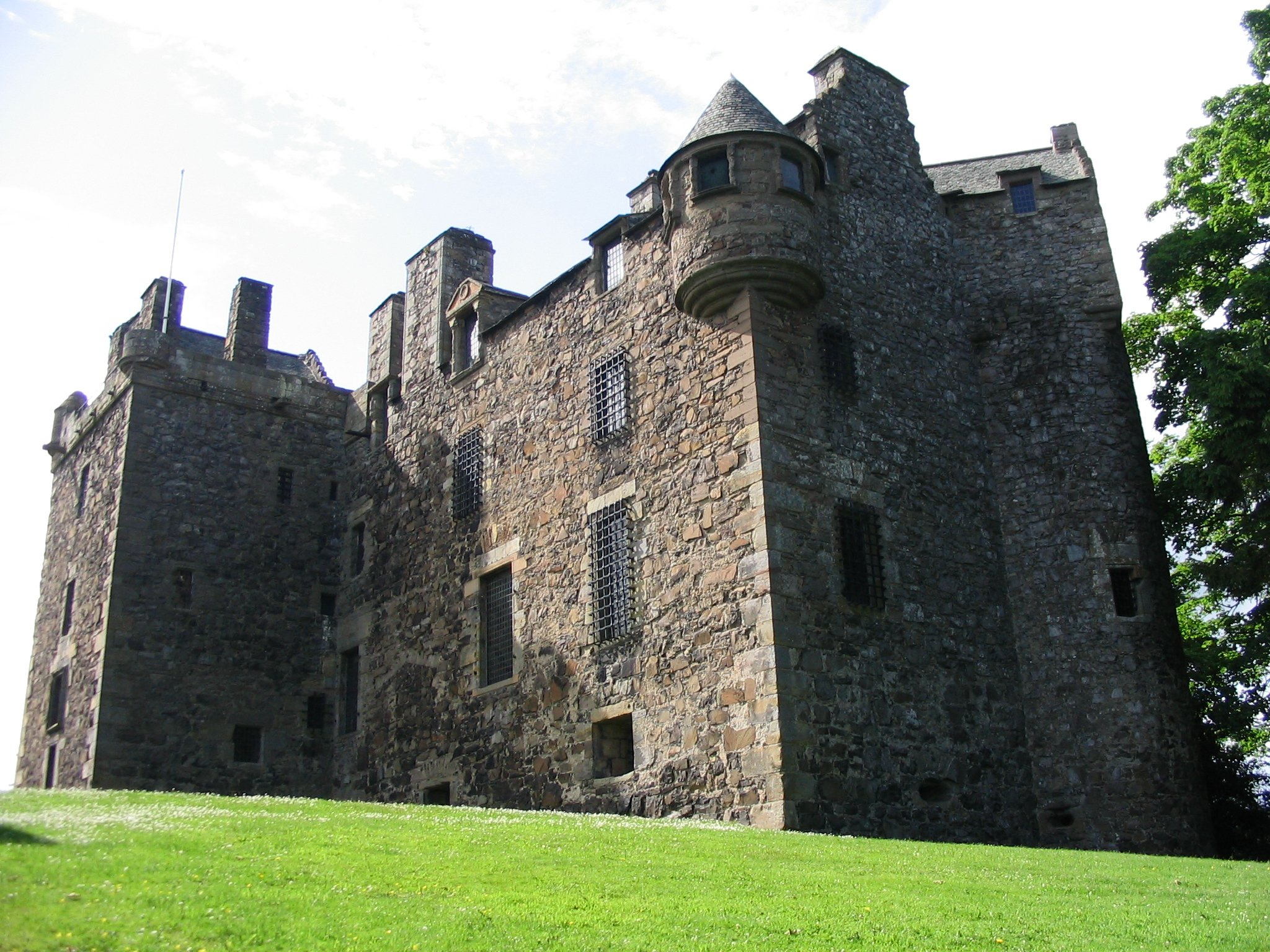
Elcho Castle

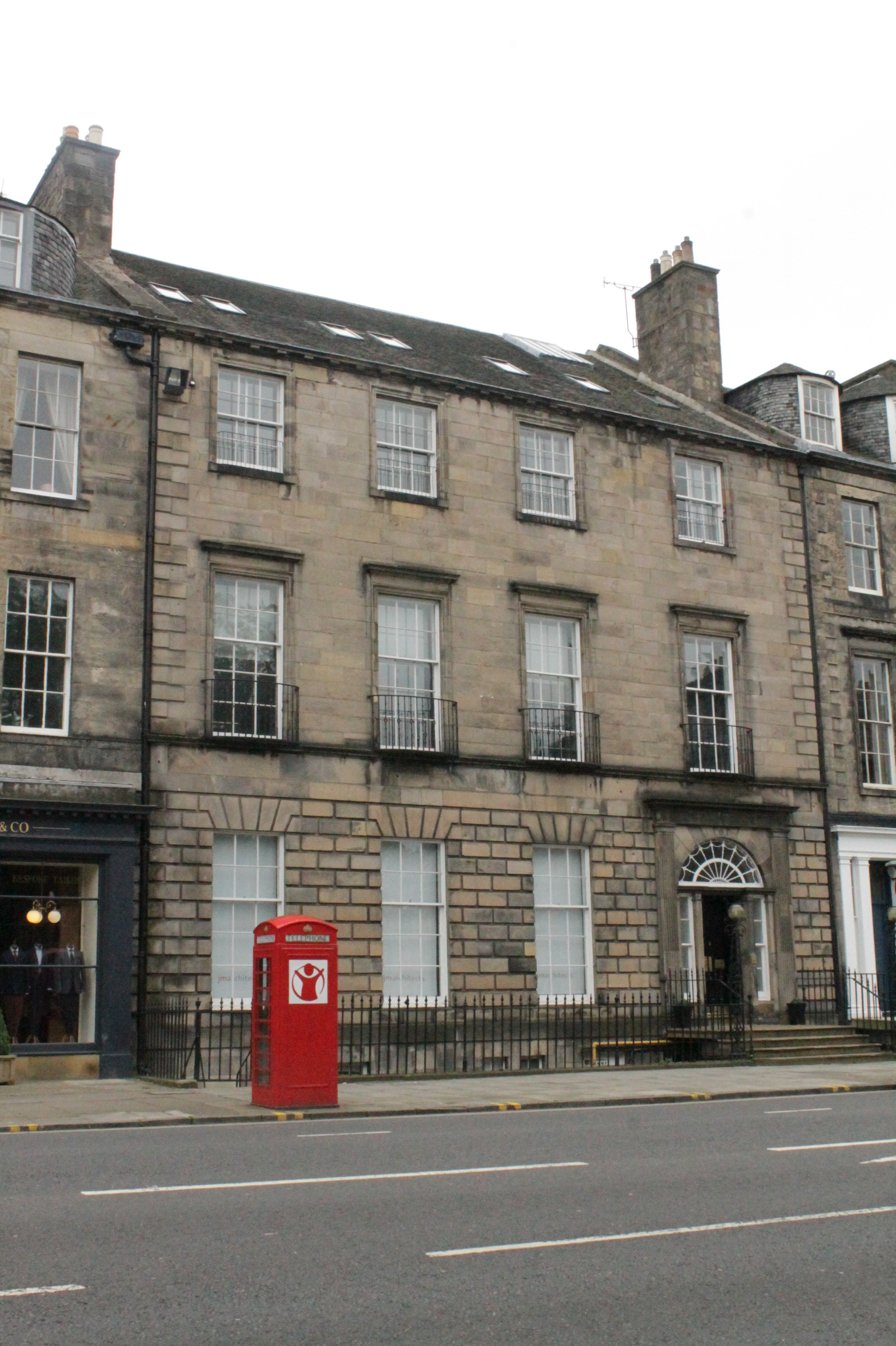
Townhouse at 64 Queen Street, Edinburgh

He was succeeded by his son, the ninth Earl of Wemyss and fifth Earl of March. He served as Lord-Lieutenant of Peeblesshire from 1853 to 1880. When he died the titles passed to his son, the tenth Earl. He represented Gloucestershire and Haddingtonshire in the House of Commons for many years. He was succeeded by his fifth but eldest surviving son, the eleventh Earl. He sat as Conservative Member of Parliament for Haddingtonshire and Ipswich and served as Lord-Lieutenant of Haddingtonshire from 1918 to 1937. As of 2014 the titles are held by the thirteenth Earl of Wemyss and ninth Earl of March, who succeeded in 2008. He is also Chief of Clan Charteris.

Several other members of the Wemyss, later Charteris, family, have also gained distinction. William Wemyss (1760–1822), son of the Hon. James Wemyss (1726–1786), third son of the fifth Earl, was a Lieutenant-General in the Army. His elder son James Erskine Wemyss (1789–1854) was a Rear-Admiral in the Royal Navy and the grandfather of Admiral of the Fleet Rosslyn Erskine-Wemyss, 1st Baron Wester Wemyss (12 April 1864 – 24 May 1933), known as Sir Rosslyn Wemyss between 1916 and 1919. William Wemyss (1790–1852), younger son of the aforementioned William Wemyss, was a Lieutenant-General in the Army. William Binfield Wemyss (1810–1890), son of James Wemyss (1778–1849), younger son of the aforementioned the Hon. James Wemyss, was a General in the Army. The Hon. Frederick William Charteris (1833–1887), third son of the ninth Earl, was a captain in the Royal Navy. The Hon. Sir Evan Edward Charteris (1864–1940), sixth son of the tenth Earl, was a historian, biographer and barrister and notably published biographies of John Singer Sargent and of Edmund Gosse. The Hon. Martin Michael Charles Charteris, second son of the aforementioned Captain Hugo Francis Charteris, Lord Elcho, eldest son of the eleventh Earl, was private secretary to Queen Elizabeth II and was created a life peer as Baron Charteris of Amisfield in 1978. Hugo Charteris (1922–1970), grandson of the eleventh Earl, was a renowned post-war novelist and screenwriter. His son, Jamie Charteris, became a successful cartoonist.

The family seat is Gosford House near Longniddry, East Lothian. The family also owns Stanway House in Gloucestershire, Neidpath Castle near Peebles and Elcho Castle near Perth.

== Earls of Wemyss (1633) ==
- John Wemyss, 1st Earl of Wemyss (died 1649)
- David Wemyss, 2nd Earl of Wemyss (1610–1679)
- Margaret Wemyss, 3rd Countess of Wemyss (1659–1705)
- David Wemyss, 4th Earl of Wemyss (c. 1678–1720)
- James Wemyss, 5th Earl of Wemyss (1699–1756)
- David Wemyss, soi disant 6th Earl of Wemyss (1721–1787) (attainted 1746)
- Francis Wemyss Charteris, soi disant 7th Earl of Wemyss (1723–1808)
- Francis Wemyss Charteris Douglas, 8th Earl of Wemyss, 4th Earl of March (1772–1853) (restored 1826)
- Francis Wemyss-Charteris, 9th Earl of Wemyss, 5th Earl of March (1795–1883)
- Francis Richard Charteris, 10th Earl of Wemyss, 6th Earl of March (1818–1914)
- Hugo Richard Charteris, 11th Earl of Wemyss, 7th Earl of March (1857–1937)
- (Francis) David Charteris, 12th Earl of Wemyss, 8th Earl of March (1912–2008)
- James Donald Charteris, 13th Earl of Wemyss, 9th Earl of March (born 1948)

The heir apparent is his only son (Francis) Richard Charteris, Lord Elcho (born 1984), a lawyer.

Line of succession, simplified
- James Wemyss, 5th Earl of Wemyss
  - David Wemyss, (6th Earl of Wemyss) (1721–1787)
  - Francis Charteris, (7th Earl of Wemyss). (1723–1808)
    - Francis Charteris, Lord Elcho (1749–1808)
      - Francis Douglas, 8th Earl of Wemyss, 4th Earl of March (1772–1853)
        - Francis Wemyss-Charteris, 9th Earl of Wemyss, 5th Earl of March (1795–1883)
          - Francis Charteris, 10th Earl of Wemyss, 6th Earl of March (1818–1914)
            - Francis Charteris (1844–1870)
            - Arthur Charteris (1846–1847)
            - Alfred Charteris, (1847–1873)
            - Hugo Charteris, 11th Earl of Wemyss, 7th Earl of March (1857–1937)
              - Hugo Charteris, Lord Elcho (1884–1916)
                - David Charteris, 12th Earl of Wemyss, 8th Earl of March (1912–2008)
                  - Iain Charteris, Lord Elcho (1945–1954)
                  - James Charteris, 13th Earl of Wemyss, 9th Earl of March (born 1948)
                    - (1). (Francis) Richard Charteris, Lord Elcho (born 1984)
                - Martin Charteris, Baron Charteris of Amisfield (1913–1999)
                  - (2). Hon. Andrew Charteris (born 1947)
                  - (3). Hon. Harold Charteris (born 1950)
              - Hon. Guy Charteris (1886–1967)
                - Hugo Charteris (1922–1970)
                  - (4). Jamie Charteris (born 1958)
                    - (5). Felix Charteris (born 1992)
          - Frederick Charteris (1833–1887)
            - Nigel Charteris (1878–1967)
              - John Charteris (1914–2006)
                - (6). Martin Charteris (born 1960)
                  - (7). Michael Charteris (born 1990)
                    - (8). Frederick Charteris (born 2023)
                    - (9). Robert Charteris (born 2026)
                  - (10). Andrew Charteris (born 1992)
              - David Charteris (1920–2007)
                - (11) Nigel Charteris (born 1958)
                  - (12) James Charteris (born 1992)
                  - (13) Thomas Charteris (born 1998)
  - Hon. James Wemyss (1726–1786)
    - William Wemyss (1760–1822)
      - James Erskine-Wemyss (1789–1854)
        - James Erskine-Wemyss (1829–1864)
          - Randolph Erskine-Wemyss (1858–1908)
            - Michael Erskine-Wemyss (1888—1982)
              - David Wemyss of that Ilk (1920–2005)
                - (14). Michael Wemyss of that Ilk, younger (born 1947)
                - (15). Charles Wemyss (born 1952)
                  - (16). James Michael Wemyss (born 1987)
              - (17). Andrew Wemyss (born 1925)
                - (18). Andrew Wemyss (born 1970)
                  - (19). Jonathan Wemyss (born 2004)
          - Rosslyn Wemyss, 1st Baron Wester Wemyss (1864–1933)

1–11 are in line for the Barony of Wemyss as well as the earldoms.

== Earls of March (1697) ==
- William Douglas, 1st Earl of March (c. 1665–1705)
- William Douglas, 2nd Earl of March (c. 1696–1731)
- William Douglas, 4th Duke of Queensberry, 3rd Earl of March (1725–1810)
- Francis Wemyss Charteris Douglas, 8th Earl of Wemyss, 4th Earl of March (1772–1853)

See above for further succession

Marquesses of Queensberry and Dukes of Buccleuch, Dover, Monmouth, and Queensberry

Lord Scott of Buccleuch, 1606
Walter Scott c. 1565–1611; 1st Lord Scott of Buccleuch
Earl of Buccleuch and Lord Scott of Whitchester and Eskdaill, 1619	Viscount Drumlanrig and Lord Douglas of Hawick and Tibbers, 1628; Earl of Queensberry, 1633
Walter Scott c. 1606–1633; 1st Earl of Buccleuch, etc., 2nd Lord Scott of Buccleuch	William Douglas c. 1582 – c. 1639–1640; 1st Earl of Queensberry, etc.
Francis Scott; 1626–1651; 2nd Earl of Buccleuch, etc., 3rd Lord Scott of Buccleuch	King Charles II; 1630–1685	James Douglas d. 1671; 2nd Earl of Queensberry, etc.	William Douglas d. 1673
Duke of Buccleuch (2nd creation), April 1663	Duke of Monmouth, Earl of Doncaster, and Baron Scott of Tynedale, February 1663; Duke of Buccleuch (1st creation), Earl of Dalkeith (1st creation), and Lord Scott of Whitchester and Eskdale, April 1663	Marquess of Queensberry, Earl of Drumlanrig and Sanquhar, Viscount of Nith, Torthorwald and Ross, 1682; Duke of Queensberry, Marquess of Dumfriesshire, 1684	Baronet, of Kelhead, 1668
Mary Scott; 1647–1661; 3rd Countess of Buccleuch, etc., 4th Lady Scott of Buccleuch	Anne Scott; 1651–1732; 1st Duchess of Buccleuch, 4th Countess of Buccleuch, etc., 5th Lady Scott of Buccleuch	James Scott; 1649–1685; Duke of Monmouth, etc., Duke of Buccleuch, etc.	William Douglas; 1637–1695; 1st Duke of Queensberry, etc., 1st Marquess of Queensberry, etc., 3rd Earl of Queensberry, etc.	Catherine Douglas	James Douglas; 1639–1708; 1st Baronet of Kelhead
Dukedoms of Monmouth and Buccleuch and subsidiary titles forfeit, 1685
Duke of Dover, Marquess of Beverley, and Baron Ripon, 1708	Earl of March (Scotland, 4th creation), Viscount of Peebles, and Lord Douglas of Neidpath, Lyne and Munard, 1697
James Scott; 1674–1705 styled Earl of Dalkeith	James Douglas; 1662–1711; 2nd Duke of Queensberry, etc., 1st Duke of Dover, etc., 2nd Marquess of Queensberry, etc.	William Douglas; 1673–1705; 1st Earl of March, etc.	Anne Douglas d. 1700	William Douglas d. 1733; 2nd Baronet of Kelhead
Earl of Doncaster and Baron Scott of Tynedale, restored, 1743	Earl of Solway, Viscount of Tiberris, Lord Douglas of Lockerbie, Dalveen and Thornhill, 1706
Francis Scott; 1695–1751; 2nd Duke of Buccleuch, etc., 5th Earl of Buccleuch, etc., 6th Lord Scott of Buccleuch	Jane Douglas; 1701–1729	James Douglas; 1697–1715; 3rd Marquess of Queensberry, etc.	Charles Douglas; 1698–1778; 3rd Duke of Queensberry, etc., 2nd Duke of Dover, etc., 4th Marquess of Queensberry, etc., Earl of Solway, etc.	William Douglas; 1696–1731; 2nd Earl of March, etc.	James Wemyss; 1699–1756; 5th Earl of Wemyss, etc.	John Douglas c. 1708–1778; 3rd Baronet of Kelhead
Excluded from succession to the dukedoms of Queensberry and Dover (Note: James Douglas, 3rd Marquess of Queensberry was excluded from the line of succession to the Dukedoms of Queensberry and Dover when his father — the 2nd Duke of Queensberry — surrendered all of his titles except the Marquessate and its subsidiary titles back to the Crown and obtained a new grant with the same precedence for the surrendered titles that altered the succession to his second son and then the heirs male and female of the 1st Earl of Queensberry. The succession of the Marquessate continued in remainder to the heirs male of the 1st Earl of Queensberry.)	Dukedom of Dover and its subsidiary titles, and earldom of Solway and its subsidiary titles extinct, 1778
Francis Scott; 1721–1750 styled Earl of Dalkeith	Henry Douglas; 1722–1754 styled Earl of Drumlanrig	Charles Douglas; 1726–1756 styled Earl of Drumlanrig	William Douglas; 1724–1810; 4th Duke of Queensberry, etc., 5th Marquess of Queensberry, etc., 3rd Earl of March, etc., Earl of Ruglen	Francis Wemyss-Charteris; 1723–1808 self-styled 7th Earl of Wemyss, etc.
Henry Scott; 1746–1812; 5th Duke of Queensberry, etc., 3rd Duke of Buccleuch, etc., 7th Lord Scott of Buccleuch	Francis Wemyss Charteris; 1749–1808 styled Lord Elcho	William Douglas c. 1730–1783; 4th Baronet of Kelhead
Baron Wemyss, 1821; Earl of Wemyss attainder reversed, 1826
George Scott; 1768 styled Earl of Dalkeith	Charles William Henry Montagu-Scott; 1772–1819; 6th Duke of Queensberry, etc., 4th Duke of Buccleuch, etc., 8th Lord Scott of Buccleuch	Francis Wemyss Charteris Douglas; 1772–1853; 8th Earl of Wemyss, etc., 4th Earl of March, 1st Baron Wemyss	Charles Douglas; 1777–1837; 6th Marquess of Queensberry, etc., 5th Baronet of Kelhead	John Douglas; 1779–1856; 7th Marquess of Queensberry, etc., 6th Baronet of Kelhead
George Henry Scott; 1798–1808; Lord Scott of Whitchester	Walter Francis Montagu Douglas Scott; 1806–1884; 7th Duke of Queensberry, etc., 5th Duke of Buccleuch, etc., 8th Earl of Buccleuch, etc., 9th Lord Scott of Buccleuch	Francis Wemyss-Charteris; 1795–1883; 9th Earl of Wemyss, 5th Earl of March, 2nd Baron Wemyss	Archibald William Douglas; 1818–1858; 8th Marquess of Queensberry, etc., 7th Baronet of Kelhead
Baron Montagu of Beaulieu (UK), 1885
William Henry Walter Montagu Douglas Scott; 1831–1914; 8th Duke of Queensberry, etc., 6th Duke of Buccleuch, etc., 10th Lord Scott of Buccleuch	Henry John Montagu-Scott; 1832–1905; 1st Baron Montagu of Beaulieu	Francis Wemyss-Charteris; 1818–1914; 10th Earl of Wemyss, 6th Earl of March, 3rd Baron Wemyss	John Sholto Douglas; 1844–1900; 9th Marquess of Queensberry, etc., 8th Baronet of Kelhead
Baron Kelhead (UK), 1893
Walter Henry Montagu Douglas Scott; 1861–1886 styled Earl of Dalkeith	John Charles Montagu Douglas Scott; 1864–1935; 9th Duke of Queensberry, etc., 7th Duke of Buccleuch, etc., 11th Lord Scott of Buccleuch	John Walter Edward Douglas-Scott-Montagu; 1866–1929; 3rd Baron Montagu of Beaulieu	Hugo Richard Charteris; 1857–1937; 11th Earl of Wemyss, 7th Earl of March, 4th Baron Wemyss	Francis Archibald Douglas; 1867–1894 styled Viscount Drumlanrig, Baron Kelhead	Percy Sholto Douglas; 1868–1920; 10th Marquess of Queensberry, etc., 9th Baronet of Kelhead
Barony Kelhead extinct, 1894
Walter John Montagu-Douglas-Scott; 1894–1973; 10th Duke of Queensberry, etc., 8th Duke of Buccleuch, etc., 12th Lord Scott of Buccleuch	Hugo Charteris; 1884–1916	Francis Archibald Kelhead Douglas; 1898–1954; 11th Marquess of Queensberry, etc., 10th Baronet of Kelhead
Baron Charteris of Amisfield, 1978
Walter Francis John Montagu Douglas Scott; 1923–2007; 11th Duke of Queensberry, etc., 9th Duke of Buccleuch, etc., 13th Lord Scott of Buccleuch	Edward John Barrington Douglas-Scott-Montagu; 1926–2015; 3rd Baron Montagu of Beaulieu	Francis David Charteris; 1912–2008; 12th Earl of Wemyss, 8th Earl of March, 5th Baron Wemyss	Martin Michael Charles Charteris; 1913–1999; Baron Charteris of Amisfield	David Harrington Angus Douglas; 1929–2026; 12th Marquess of Queensberry, etc., 11th Baronet of Kelhead
Baron Charteris of Amisfield extinct, 1999
Richard Walter John Montagu Douglas Scott b. 1954; 12th Duke of Queensberry, etc., 10th Duke of Buccleuch, etc., 14th Lord Scott of Buccleuch	Ralph Douglas-Scott-Montagu b. 1961; 4th Baron Montagu of Beaulieu	Jonathan Deane Montagu-Scott b. 11 October 1975	James Charteris b. 1948; 13th Earl of Wemyss, 9th Earl of March, 6th Baron Wemyss	Sholto Francis Guy Douglas b. 1967; 13th Marquess of Queensberry, etc., 12th Baronet of Kelhead	Lord Torquil Oberon Tobias Douglas b. 1978
Heir presumptive to the Barony Montagu of Beaulieu	Heir presumptive to the Marquessate of Queensberry
Walter John Francis Montagu Douglas Scott b. 1984 styled Earl of Dalkeith	Francis Richard (Dick) Charteris b. 1984 style Lord Elcho
Heir presumptive to the Dukedom of Queensbury, etc. and the Dukedom of Buccleuch, etc.	Heir apparent to the earldoms of Wemyss and March
Willoughby Ralph Montagu Douglas Scott b. 2016 styled Lord Eskdaill

== See also ==
- Clan Charteris
- Duke of Queensberry
- Marquess of Queensberry
- Earl of March
- Earl of Ruglen
- Earl of Selkirk
- Baron Wester Wemyss
