= James Wemyss (1726–1786) =

Scottish naval officer and politician

Member of Parliament for Sutherland
- In office 1768–1784
- Preceded by: Alexander Mackay
- Succeeded by: William Wemyss

Member of Parliament for Fife
- In office 1763–1768
- Preceded by: James St Clair
- Succeeded by: John Scott

Personal details
- Born: 23 February 1726
- Died: 10 May 1786 (aged 60)
- Spouse: Lady Elizabeth Sutherland (m. 1757, died)
- Children: Elizabeth Margaret Wemyss; William Wemyss; James Wemyss
- Parent(s): James Wemyss, 5th Earl of Wemyss; Janet Charteris

James Wemyss (23 February 1726 – 10 May 1786) was a Scottish naval officer and politician who sat in the House of Commons from 1763 to 1784.

== Early life ==
Wemyss was born on 23 February 1726. Wemyss was the third and youngest son of James Wemyss, 5th Earl of Wemyss by his wife Janet Charteris. Wemyss was educated in Edinburgh.

His eldest brother, David, Lord Elcho, was attainted in 1746, and his other older brother, Francis, adopted the name Charteris as heir to their maternal grandfather Francis Charteris, a Scottish soldier and adventurer who earned a substantial sum of money through gambling and the South Sea Bubble. Therefore, James was named heir to the Wemyss estates, including Wemyss Castle, by a new entail of 31 July 1750. The 5th Earl of Wemyss died in 1756.

== Career ==
Wemyss served as a midshipman in the Royal Navy from 1741, and was promoted to Lieutenant in 1745. However doubts were raised regarding his professional abilities as a sailor, and he was denied further promotion. After succeeding to the Wemyss estates, his brother Francis wrote to him urging him to quit the navy, establish himself at Wemyss Castle and marry. A final request for promotion was refused in January 1757, after which Wemyss resigned his naval commission and returned to his estate. In 1759, his friend, Richard Kempenfelt, wrote to him "The navy should not have neglected you, nor you it. Possessed of every quality to shine conspicuous, why should you shade yourself in peace when your country, when all Europe, is as in a blaze of arms?"

Wemyss was elected Member of Parliament for Fife from 1763 to 1768 and for Sutherland from 1768 to 1784, when he was succeeded by his son.

== Personal life ==
On 29 August 1757, James Wemyss was married to his half-cousin Lady Elizabeth Sutherland (d. 1803), the only daughter of William Sutherland, 17th Earl of Sutherland by his wife Lady Elizabeth Wemyss, daughter of David Wemyss, 4th Earl of Wemyss. Their children included:

- Elizabeth Margaret Wemyss (d. 1800), who married MP Alexander Brodie, son of James Brodie, Sheriff of Elgin.
- William Wemyss (1760–1822), a soldier and MP who married Frances Erskine, daughter of Sir William Erskine, 1st Baronet.
- James Wemyss (1778–1849), who married Caroline Charlotte Binfield, daughter of Reverend Henry Binfield.

Wemyss died on 10 May 1786. His widow lived nearly another seventeen years until 24 January 1803.

=== Descendants ===
Elizabeth Margaret was the mother of Elizabeth Gordon, Duchess of Gordon. Through his son William, he was the grandfather of Frances Wemyss (1794–1858), who married James St Clair-Erskine, 3rd Earl of Rosslyn; Rear-Admiral James Erskine Wemyss (1789–1854); Lieutenant-General William Wemyss (1790–1852); and Clementina Wemyss (1805–1834), who married with James Dewar, Chief Justice of The Supreme Court, Bombay.

Parliament of Great Britain
Preceded by James St Clair	Member of Parliament for Fife; 1763–1768	Succeeded by John Scott
Preceded by Alexander Mackay	Member of Parliament for Sutherland; 1768–1784	Succeeded by William Wemyss
