= David Wemyss, Lord Elcho =

Scottish Jacobite earl (1721–1787)

David Wemyss, Lord Elcho, de jure Earl of Wemyss
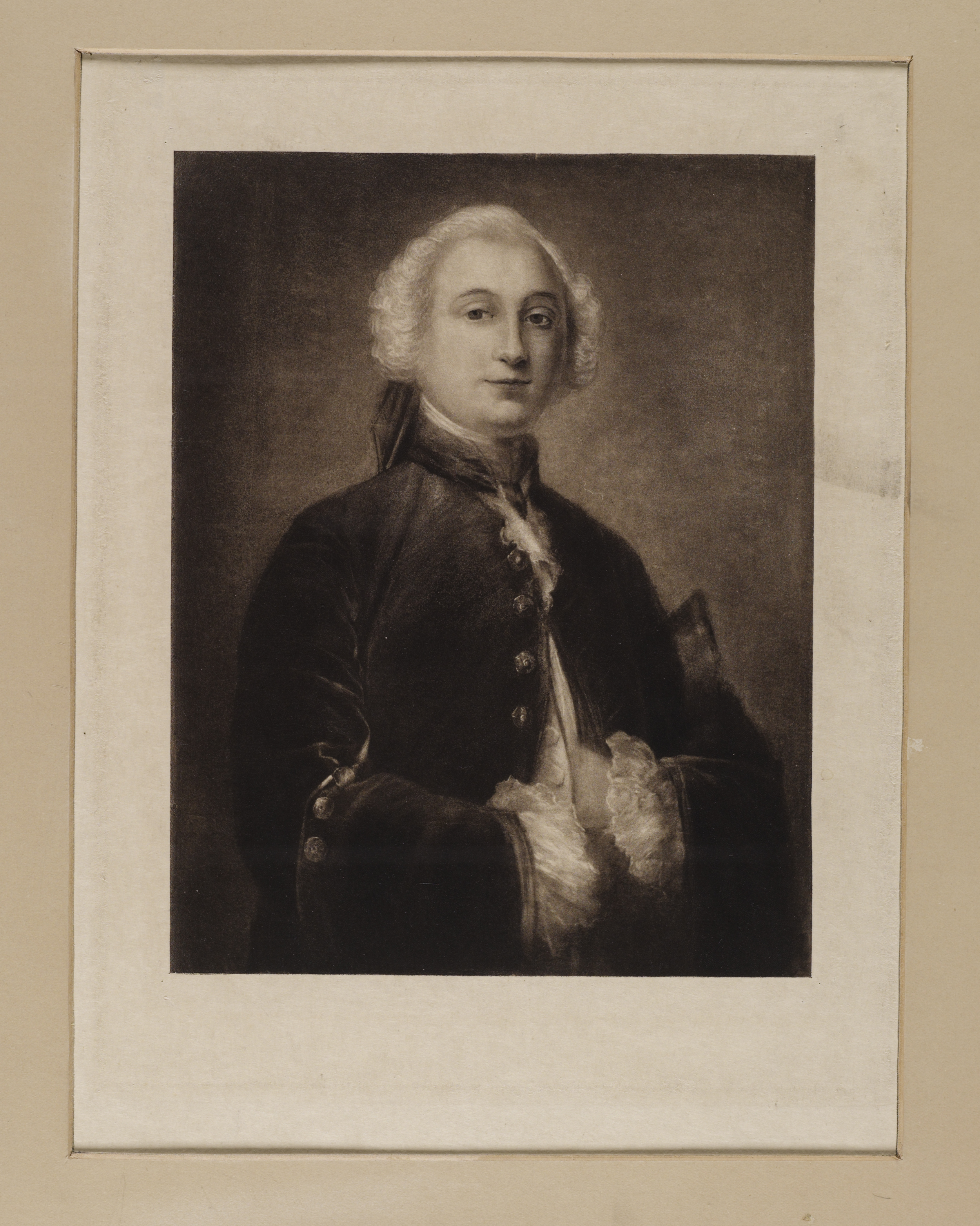
- David Wemyss, Lord Elcho ca 1741
- Born: 21 August 1721; Wemyss Castle, Fife
- Died: 29 April 1787 (aged 65); Paris
- Burial place: Paris
- Relatives: Francis Charteris (1675-1732); 5th Earl of Wemyss (1699-1756); Sir James Steuart 1708-1780
- Military career
- Allegiance: Jacobite 1745-1746; France 1756-1763
- Branch: Army
- Service years: 1745-1763
- Rank: Colonel
- Unit: Royal-Ecossais
- Conflicts: Jacobite rising of 1745; Battle of Prestonpans Falkirk Muir Culloden; Seven Years' War
- Awards: Royal Company of Archers; Order of Military Merit (France) 1770

David Wemyss, Lord Elcho and de jure 6th Earl of Wemyss (12 August 1721 – 29 April 1787), was a Scottish peer and Jacobite, attainted for his part in the 1745 Rising was deprived of titles and estates.

One of the few Jacobites excluded from the 1747 Act of Indemnity, his attempts to return home were unsuccessful and he spent the rest of his life in France and Switzerland. His wife Sofia (1756–1777) died in childbirth; Elcho left no legitimate children and when he died in Paris in 1787, his property passed to a younger brother.

His record of the 1745 Rising or A short account of the affairs of Scotland in the years 1744, 1745, 1746, is now considered a key contemporary source for the Rising.

== Biographical details ==
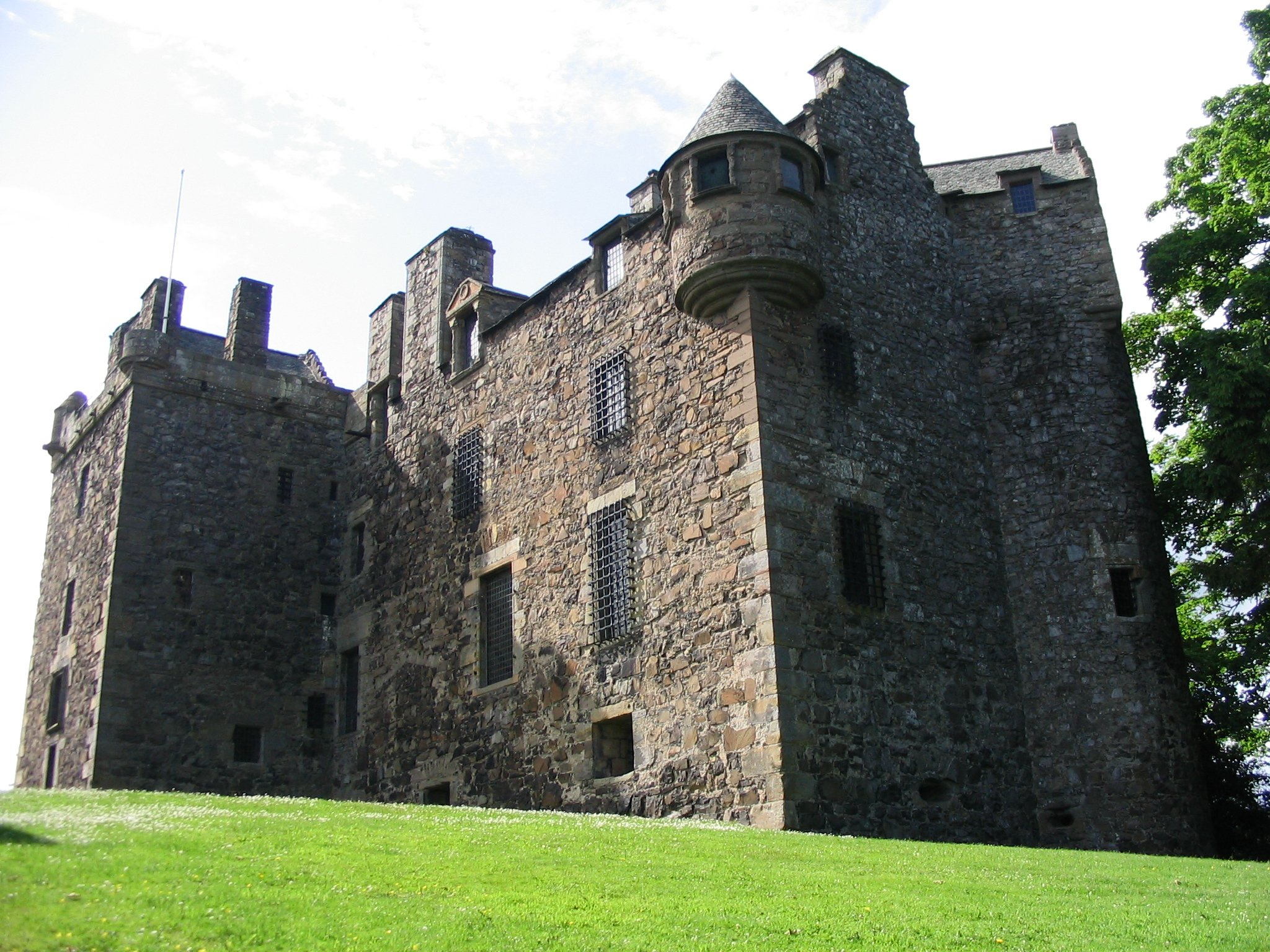
Elcho Castle, Perth, now managed by Historic Environment Scotland

David Wemyss, Lord Elcho was born on 21 August 1721 at Wemyss Castle in Fife, eldest son of James Wemyss, 5th Earl of Wemyss and Janet Charteris (died 1778). His title derived from Elcho Castle which was abandoned in the 1730s but restored in the 19th century. It is one of the earliest examples of a Scottish building preserved purely for its historical value.

His mother was the only child of Francis Charteris, who became immensely wealthy through his investment in the South Sea Company. A well-known rake, he appears in William Hogarth's series A Harlot's Progress, and was sentenced to death for rape in 1730 before being pardoned.

Elcho had two younger brothers, Francis (1723-1808) and James (1726–1786). His sister Frances (1722-1789) married Sir James Steuart (1707–1780), exiled for his part in the 1745 Rising but allowed home in 1763. He was the author of An Inquiry into the Principles of Political Economy, described as 'one of the key economic works of the 18th century'.

In September 1776, Elcho married Sofia (1756–1777), daughter of Reichsgraf Friedrich von Üxküll-Gyllenband, who died in childbirth a year later. He left two illegitimate daughters but no legitimate heir and his property passed to his younger brother. He died in 1787 in Paris, where he was buried and his memorial destroyed in the French Revolution.

== Career ==
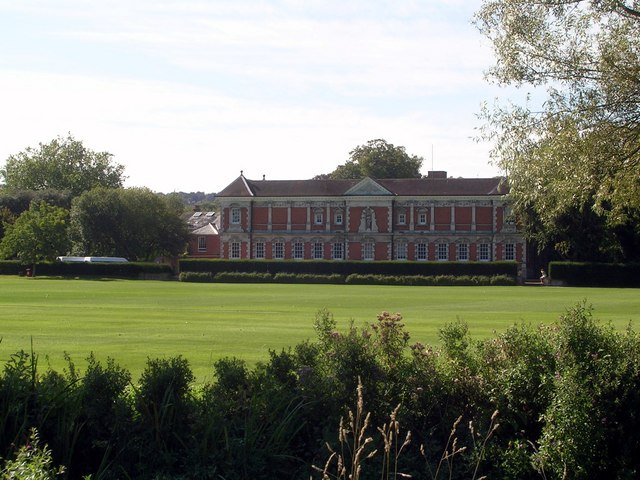
Winchester College, which Elcho attended from 1734 to 1738

Like many Jacobite sympathisers, Elcho had a background of Non-Juring Episcopalianism, Freemasonry and opposition to the 1707 Union; like the Jacobite peer Earl Kilmarnock, his father was Grand Master of Scotland, as was his brother Francis. However, the family was not considered activists and had not been involved in previous Risings.

After his parents separated in 1732, he was sent to Winchester College in England, a three-week journey from his home in Fife; Elcho later recorded that he met his father only once between 1734 and 1741. One of his classmates was James, later 6th Duke of Hamilton, whose father claimed to be the senior Scottish Jacobite. A biographer claimed Winchester turned Elcho into a fervent Scots patriot and that he 'disliked all Irishmen, most Englishmen, and a good many Scots.' During the Rising, he allegedly referred to Prince Charles as 'that damned, cowardly Italian', although this is disputed.

Elcho left Winchester in 1738 for Reims, followed by a period at the French military academy in Angers, a popular location for young British noblemen. He then went on the 18th century cultural excursion known as the Grand Tour and visited Rome in October 1740, one of whose attractions was the exiled James Stuart and his sons. After the failed 1719 Rising, many Jacobite exiles accepted pardons and returned home, among them Lord George Murray. By 1737, Jacobitism seemed little more than nostalgia and James was reportedly "living tranquilly in Rome, having abandoned all hope of a restoration."

=== Jacobite activist 1740 to 1746 ===
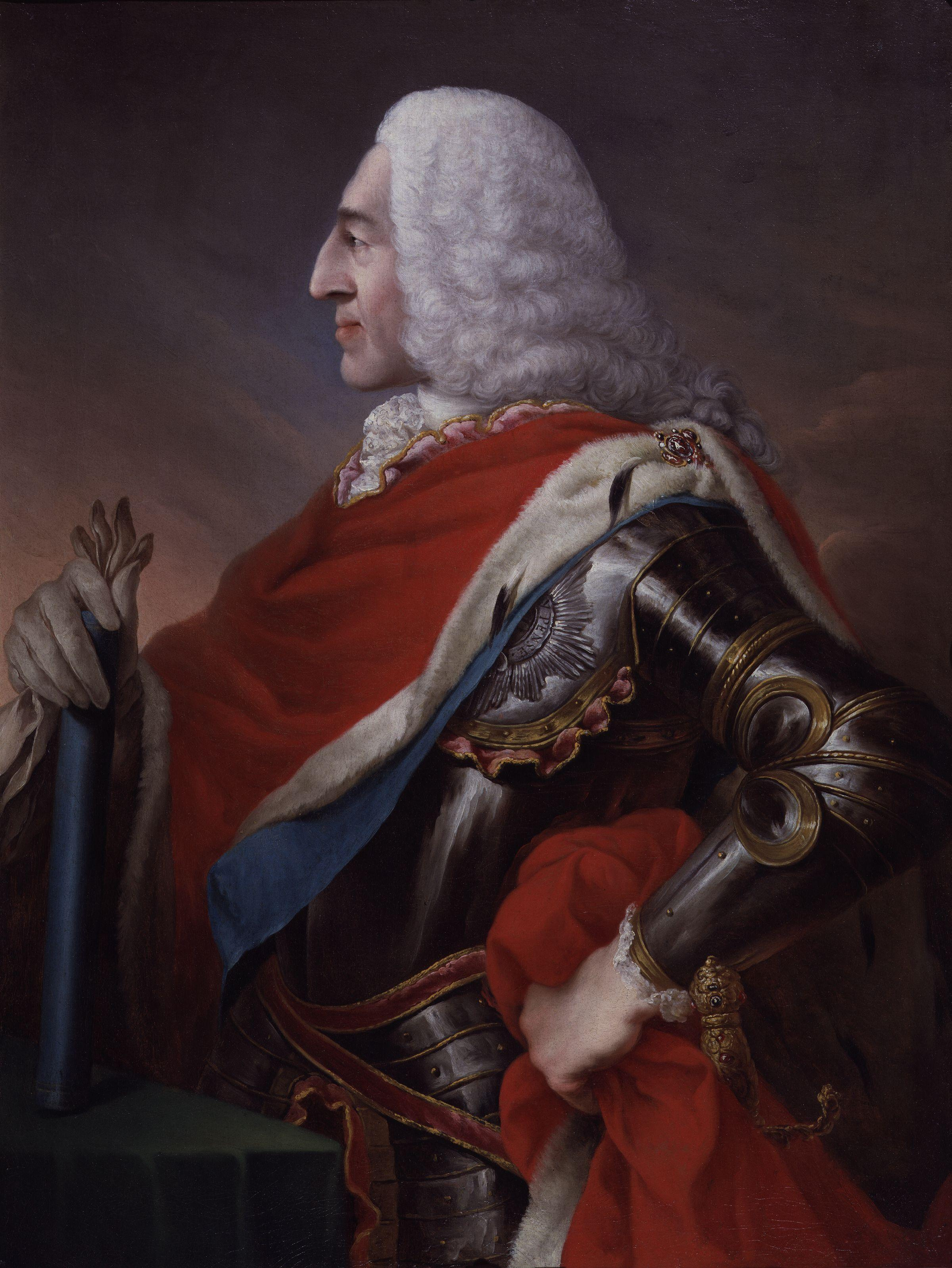
The Old Pretender James Stuart; painted ca 1741, when Elcho first met him

This changed in the late 1730s, as French statesmen sought to reduce British commercial strength, whose growth was considered a threat to the European balance of power. Few of them believed the Stuart exiles were a valid option, but Elcho arrived in Rome when they were being taken seriously for the first time in two decades. In 1739, trade disputes between Britain and Spain led to the War of Jenkins' Ear, followed by the wider European conflict known as the War of the Austrian Succession in 1740. French defeat at Dettingen in June 1743 prompted efforts by King Louis XV to divert British resources from mainland Europe, including an invasion of England in early 1744 to restore the Stuarts.

James gave Elcho a commission as Colonel of dragoons, but the French fleet was severely damaged by winter storms in March and the plan was abandoned. Elcho returned to Edinburgh in December 1744, where he joined the Freemasons and the newly-formed pro-Jacobite Buck Club, whose members included his former Winchester classmate James Hamilton. Another was Murray of Broughton, whom Charles met in Paris earlier in the year, and shared his determination to come to Scotland "though with a single footman". The Club urged him not to do so, unless he brought 6,000 French troops, money and weapons; Charles Stewart, 5th Earl of Traquair (1699–1764), agreed to communicate this to the Prince but failed to do so.

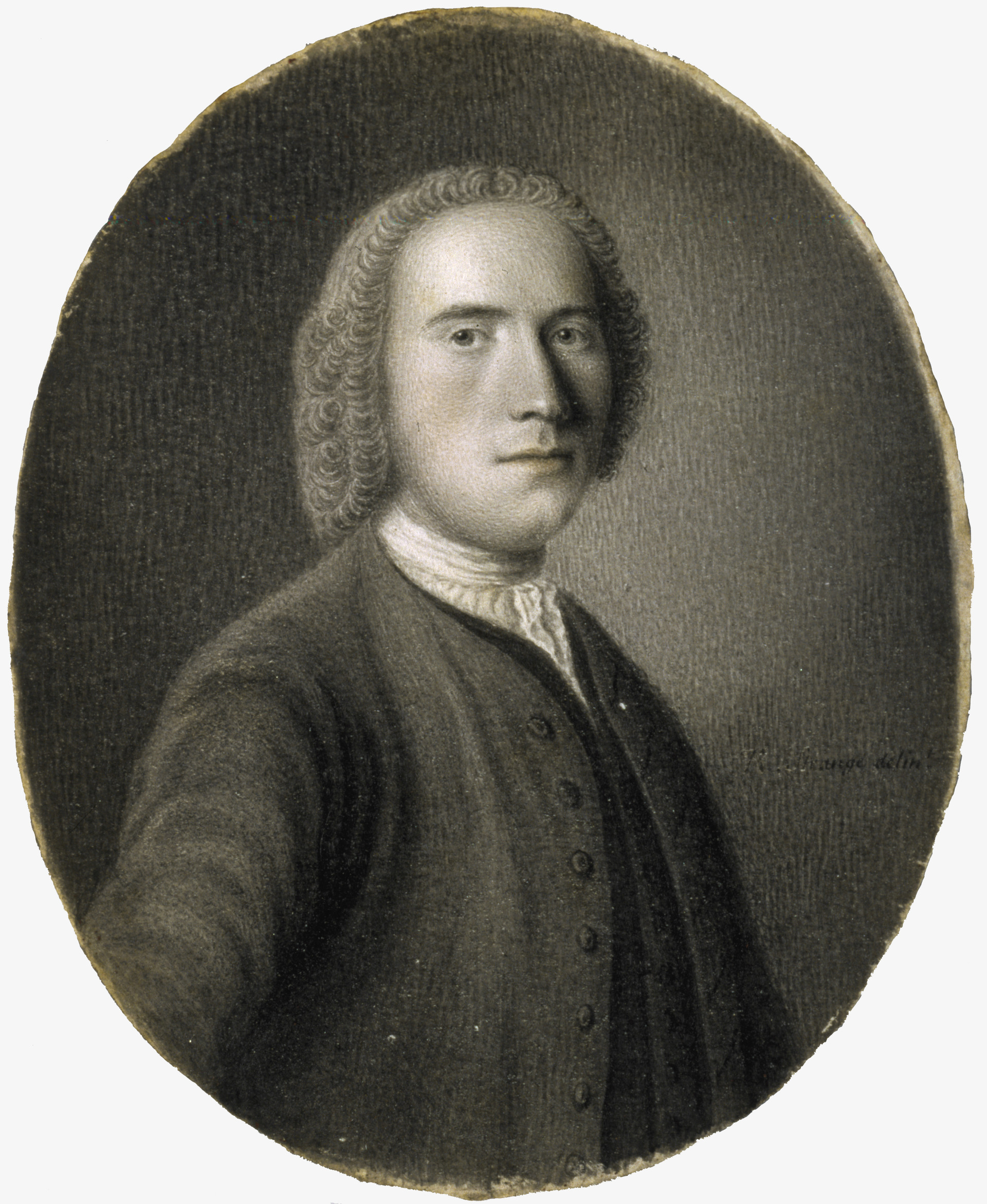
Jacobite officer Lord George Murray; at their first meeting, Charles told Elcho his loyalty was suspect

When Charles landed at Eriskay on 23 July, Elcho's first reaction was to 'implore him to return to France', and he stayed at home awaiting developments. Charles persuaded Lochiel and others to back him and launched the Rebellion at Glenfinnan on 19 August. His small force of 1,000 clansmen advanced on Edinburgh, reaching Perth on 4 September, where they were joined by Lord George Murray. Elcho met them outside Edinburgh on 16 September, bringing £1,500 in cash, which was gratefully received by Charles.

Elcho was appointed aide-de-camp and a member of the Council of War; made up of 15-20 senior leaders, it was dominated by the Highland chiefs and Perthshire lords who provided most of their manpower. Divisions within the Jacobite leadership were apparent even at this early stage, Charles warning him against Lord George Murray, who he claimed had joined only to 'better betray the cause.'

Elcho raised a troop of 'Lifeguards,' the best equipped cavalry unit in the Jacobite Army, who served as Charles' personal escort throughout the campaign. However, the decision to retreat from Derby on 5 December caused an irrevocable breach between the Prince and his Scottish supporters, including Elcho. At Culloden in April 1746, the Lifeguards escorted Charles from the battlefield, who then dismissed them, as he now trusted only the Irish exiles. On 3 May, Elcho, Lord George Murray and other Jacobites were picked up by two French ships, Le Mars and Bellone, who fought their way out past four Royal Navy vessels. Charles was left behind 'as Nobody knew where to seek for him.'

=== Post 1746 Exile ===
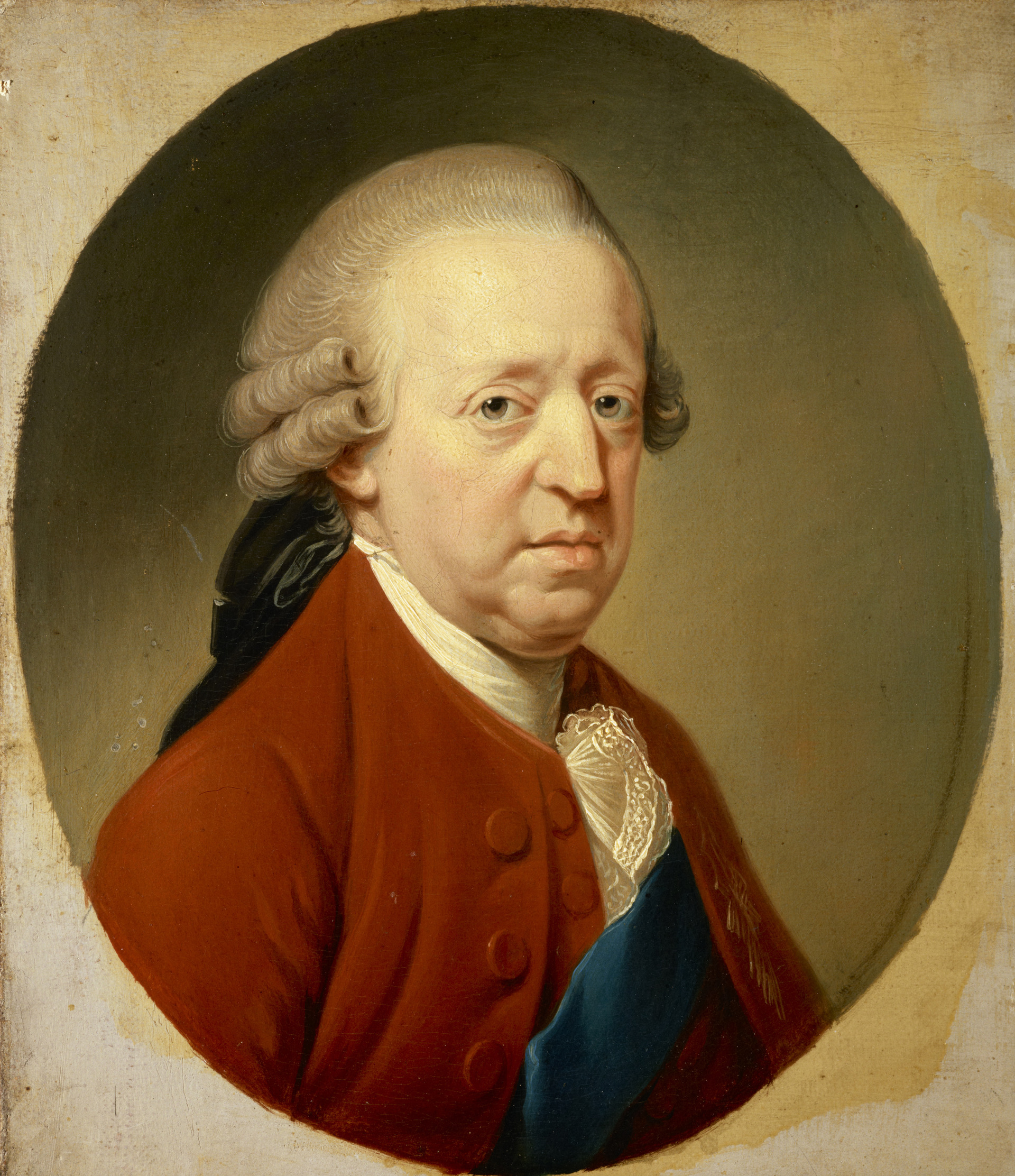
Prince Charles as on old man

Charles escaped from Scotland in October but the Treaty of Aix-la-Chapelle in 1748 ended French support for the Stuart cause, while the Scots no longer trusted him. Elcho lost his titles and lands; the attainder was not reversed until 1821, when Francis Douglas (1772-1853) became 8th Earl of Wemyss. He was excluded from the 1747 Act of Indemnity, allegedly because 'among all the Rebel commanders, he distinguished himself by his brutality and insults and cruelty to our Prisoners.' Like Lord George Murray, he spent the rest of his life in exile, despite pleas to be allowed home. In June 1747, he wrote to Lord Milton, the Lord Justice Clerk of Scotland that 'if his Majesty will allow me to come home, I will give any assurance whatever for my making his Majesty a most loyall subject for the future'.

The former Jacobite leaders argued bitterly over responsibility for the Rising's failure, and Charles refused to reimburse Elcho for the money advanced at Edinburgh in 1745. He was appointed Captain in Fitzjames's regiment, then Colonel in the Royal-Ecossais after its commander John Drummond died in September 1747. The regiment garrisoned Gravelines and Dunkirk during the 1756 to 1763 Seven Years' War and in July 1770, Louis XV gave him the Order of Military Merit.

Elcho divided his time between France and Switzerland, where he bought a property in the Principality of Neuchâtel and became a citizen of Neuchâtel. In 1770 he made a marriage proposal to Isabelle de Charrière. She had however already decided to marry another man of the same village Colombier, Neuchâtel. On 9 September 1776, he married Sofia von Üxküll-Gyllenband (1756–1777), at Beutal, belonging to the County of Montbéliard, daughter of Reichsgraf Friedrich von Üxküll-Gyllenband, a minister of the Duchy of Wurttemberg. She died in Bôle, Switzerland on 26 November 1777, giving birth to a son who lived only one day. He was appointed Baron at Cottendart in 1780 by Frederick the Great. Wemyss "...died in Paris on April 30, 1787 at his home in the Rue St Lazard." Despite his request to be buried with his wife, he was interred in Paris and the cemetery destroyed during the French Revolution.

He left two manuscripts, a journal in French, covering the principal years of his life and "A Short Account of the Affairs of Scotland, 1745-1746;" edited by Evan Charteris, this was first published in 1907.

== Sources ==
- Beer, Max (1938). Early British Economics from the XIIIth to the middle of the XVIIIth century (2003 ed.). Routledge. ISBN 978-0415313223.
- Blaikie, Walter Biggar (1916). Origins of the 'Forty-Five, and Other Papers Relating to That Rising. T. and A. Constable at the Edinburgh University Press for the Scottish History Society. OCLC 2974999.
- Charteris, Evan (1907). A Short Account of the Affairs of Scotland. David Douglas, Edinburgh.
- "Elcho Castle; Rhynd, Perth". Historic Environment Scotland.
- Fremont-Barnes, Gregory (2011). The Jacobite Rebellion 1745–46 (Essential Histories). Osprey Publishing. ISBN 978-1846039928.
- Harding, Richard (2013). The Emergence of Britain's Global Naval Supremacy: The War of 1739–1748. Boydell Press. ISBN 978-1843838234.
- McCann, Jean E (1963). The Organisation of the Jacobite Army. PHD thesis Edinburgh University. OCLC 646764870.
- McKay, Derek (1983). The Rise of the Great Powers 1648–1815. Routledge. ISBN 978-0582485549.
- Murray, John (1898). Bell, Robert Fitzroy (ed.). Memorials of John Murray of Broughton: Sometime Secretary to Prince Charles Edward, 1740-1747. T. and A. Constable at the Edinburgh University Press for the Scottish History Society. OCLC 879747289.
- Riding, Jacqueline (2016). Jacobites: A New History of the 45 Rebellion. Bloomsbury. ISBN 978-1408819128.
- Toynbee, Paget, ed. (1930). To Horace Mann, June 1746 in The letters of Horace Walpole Volume II. Clarendon Press.
- Turner, Roger (2008). "Wemyss, David, styled sixth earl of Wemyss [known as Lord Elcho]". Oxford Dictionary of National Biography (online ed.). Oxford University Press. doi:10.1093/ref:odnb/29036. (Subscription, Wikipedia Library access or UK public library membership required.)
- Wemyss, Alice (2003). Gibson, S (ed.). Elcho of the 45. Saltire Society. ISBN 978-0854110803.
- Wemyss-Kessler, Sir John. "Scotland the Brave; the life and times of David, Lord Elcho". Electric Scotland.

Peerage of Scotland
Preceded by James Wemyss	soi disant 6th Earl of Wemyss; 1756 – 1787	Succeeded by soi disant Francis (Wemyss) Charteris
