= List of grand master masons of the Grand Lodge of Scotland =

This is a list of grand master masons of the Grand Lodge of Scotland:

1. 1736–1737: William St Clair of Roslin
2. 1737–1738: George Mackenzie, 3rd Earl of Cromartie
3. 1738–1739: John Keith, 3rd Earl of Kintore (G.M. of England; 1740)
4. 1739–1740: James Douglas, 14th Earl of Morton (G.M. of England; 1741)
5. 1740–1741: Thomas Lyon, 8th Earl of Strathmore and Kinghorne (G.M. of England; 1744)
6. 1741–1742: Alexander Melville, 5th Earl of Leven
7. 1742–1743: William Boyd, 4th Earl of Kilmarnock
8. 1743–1744: James Wemyss, 5th Earl of Wemyss
9. 1744–1745: James Stuart, 8th Earl of Moray
10. 1745–1746: Henry Erskine, 10th Earl of Buchan
11. 1746–1747: William Nisbet
12. 1747–1748: Francis Wemyss-Charteris (de jure 7th Earl of Wemyss)
13. 1748–1749: Hugh Seton
14. 1749–1750: Thomas Erskine, Lord Erskine (Jacobite Earl of Mar)
15. 1750–1751: Alexander Montgomerie, 10th Earl of Eglinton
16. 1751–1752: James Hay, Lord Boyd (later 15th Earl of Erroll)
17. 1752–1753: George Drummond (Lord Provost of Edinburgh)
18. 1753–1754: Charles Hamilton Gordon
19. 1754–1755: James Forbes, Master of Forbes (later 16th Lord Forbes)
20. 1755–1757: Sholto Douglas, Lord Aberdour (later 15th Earl of Morton) (G.M. of England; 1757–1761)
21. 1757–1759: Alexander Stewart, 6th Earl of Galloway
22. 1759–1761: David Melville, 6th Earl of Leven
23. 1761–1763: Charles Bruce, 5th Earl of Elgin
24. 1763–1765: Thomas Erskine, 6th Earl of Kellie (G.M. of England-Ancients: 1760–1766)
25. 1765–1767: James Stewart (Lord Provost of Edinburgh) 1765–1767
26. 1767–1769: George Ramsay, 8th Earl of Dalhousie
27. 1769–1771: James Adolphus Oughton
28. 1771–1773: Patrick McDouall, 6th Earl of Dumfries
29. 1773–1774: John Murray, 3rd Duke of Atholl (G.M. of England-Ancients 1771–1774)
30. 1774–1776: David Dalrymple (later Lord Hailes)
31. 1776–1778: Sir William Forbes, 6th Baronet
32. 1778–1780: John Murray, 4th Duke of Atholl (G.M. of England-Ancients; 1775–1781; 1791–1813)
33. 1780–1782: Alexander Lindsay, 23rd Earl of Crawford
34. 1782–1784: David Erskine, 11th Earl of Buchan
35. 1784–1786: George Gordon, Lord Haddo
36. 1786–1788: Francis Wemyss-Charteris, Lord Elcho
37. 1788–1790: Francis Napier, 8th Lord Napier
38. 1790–1792: George Douglas, 16th Earl of Morton
39. 1792–1794: George Gordon, Marquess of Huntly (later 5th Duke of Gordon)
40. 1794–1796: William Kerr, Earl of Ancram (later 6th Marquess of Lothian)
41. 1796–1798: Francis Stuart, Lord Doune (later 10th Earl of Moray)
42. 1798–1800: Sir James Stirling, 1st Bt. (Lord Provost of Edinburgh)
43. 1800–1802: Charles Montagu-Scott, Earl of Dalkeith (later 4th Duke of Buccleuch)
44. 1802–1804: George Gordon, 5th Earl of Aboyne (later 9th Marquess of Huntly)
45. 1804–1806: George Ramsay, 9th Earl of Dalhousie
46. 1806–1808: Francis Rawdon-Hastings, 2nd Earl of Moira (later 1st Marquess of Hastings)
47. 1808–1810: The Hon. William Maule (later 1st Baron Panmure)
48. 1810–1812: James St Clair-Erskine, 2nd Earl of Rosslyn
49. 1812–1814: Robert Haldane-Duncan, 1st Earl of Camperdown
50. 1814–1816: James Duff, 4th Earl Fife
51. 1816–1818: Sir John Marjoribanks, Bt.
52. 1818–1820: George Hay, 8th Marquess of Tweeddale
53. 1820–1822: Alexander Hamilton, 10th Duke of Hamilton
54. 1822–1824: George Campbell, 6th Duke of Argyll
55. 1824–1826: John Campbell, Viscount Glenorchy (later 2nd Marquess of Breadalbane)
56. 1826–1827: Thomas Hay-Drummond, 11th Earl of Kinnoull
57. 1827–1830: Francis Wemyss-Charteris, Lord Elcho (later 9th Earl of Wemyss)
58. 1830–1832: George Kinnaird, 9th Lord Kinnaird
59. 1832–1833: Henry Erskine, 12th Earl of Buchan
60. 1833–1835: William Hamilton, Marquess of Douglas (later 11th Duke of Hamilton)
61. 1835–1836: Alexander Murray, Viscount Fincastle (later 6th Earl of Dunmore)
62. 1836–1838: James Broun-Ramsay, Lord Ramsay (later 1st Marquis of Dalhousie)
63. 1838–1840: Sir James Forrest, 1st Baronet (Lord Provost of Edinburgh)
64. 1840–1841: George Leslie, 15th Earl of Rothes
65. 1841–1843: Lord Frederick FitzClarence
66. 1843–1864: George Murray, Lord Glenlyon (later 6th Duke of Atholl)
67. 1864–1867: John Whyte-Melville
68. 1867–1870: Fox Maule Ramsay, 11th Earl of Dalhousie
69. 1870–1873: Robert St Clair-Erskine, 4th Earl of Rosslyn
70. 1873–1882: Sir Michael Shaw-Stewart, 7th Baronet
71. 1882–1885: Walter Erskine, 11th Earl of Mar
72. 1885–1892: Archibald Campbell, 1st Baronet (later 1st Baron Blythswood)
73. 1892–1893: George Baillie-Hamilton, 11th Earl of Haddington
74. 1893–1897: Sir Charles Dalrymple of Newhailes, 1st Bt.
75. 1897–1900: Alexander Fraser, 19th Lord Saltoun
76. 1900–1904: Hon. James Hozier (later 2nd Baron Newlands)
77. 1904–1907: Hon. Charles Maule Ramsay
78. 1907–1909: Thomas Gibson-Carmichael (later 1st Baron Carmichael) (Grand Master of Victoria, Australia, 1909–1912)
79. 1909–1913: John Stewart-Murray, Marquess of Tullibardine (later 8th Duke of Atholl)
80. 1913–1916: Robert King Stewart of Murdostoun
81. 1916–1920: Sir Robert Gilmour, 1st Baronet
82. 1920–1921: Archibald Montgomerie, 16th Earl of Eglinton
83. 1921–1924: Edward Bruce, 10th Earl of Elgin
84. 1924–1926: John Dalrymple, 12th Earl of Stair
85. 1926–1929: Archibald Douglas, 4th Baron Blythswood
86. 1929–1931: Alexander Archibald Hagart-Speirs
87. 1931–1933: Robert Hamilton, 11th Lord Belhaven and Stenton
88. 1933–1935: Alexander Fraser, 20th Lord Saltoun
89. 1935–1936: Sir Iain Colquhoun of Luss, 7th Bt.
90. 1936–1937: The Duke of York (later King George VI)
91. 1937–1939: Sir Norman Orr-Ewing, 4th Bt.
92. 1939–1942: Robert Balfour, Viscount Traprain (later 3rd Earl of Balfour)
93. 1942–1945: John Christie Stewart
94. 1945–1949: Randolph Stewart, 12th Earl of Galloway
95. 1949–1953: Malcolm Barclay-Harvey (G.M. of South Australia, 1941–1944)
96. 1953–1957: Alexander Macdonald, 7th Baron Macdonald of Slate
97. 1957–1961: Archibald Montgomerie, 17th Earl of Eglinton
98. 1961–1965: Andrew Bruce, Lord Bruce (later 11th Earl of Elgin)
99. 1965–1969: Sir Ronald Orr-Ewing, 5th Bt.
100. 1969–1974: David Liddell-Grainger
101. 1974–1979: Robert Wolrige Gordon
102. 1979–1983: James Wilson McKay
103. 1983–1985: J. M. Marcus Humphrey
104. 1985–1993: Sir Gregor MacGregor, 6th Baronet
105. 1993–1999: Michael Baillie, 3rd Baron Burton
106. 1999–2004: Sir Archibald Orr-Ewing, 6th Bt.
107. 2004–2005: The Rev. Canon Joseph Morrow
108. 2005–2008: Sir Archibald Donald Orr-Ewing, 6th Bt.
109. 2008–2018: Charles Iain Robert Wolrige-Gordon, 22nd of Hallhead and 11th of Esslemont
110. 2018–2023: William Ramsay McGhee
111. 2023–2024: The Rev. Canon Joseph Morrow
112. 2024–2025: William Ramsay McGhee
113. 2025–Present: Alexander C.G. Moncrieff

== See also ==
- Freemasonry in Scotland
