= Wemyss, Fife =

Scottish parish in Fife, Scotland, UK

Coordinates: 56.163°N 3.070°W

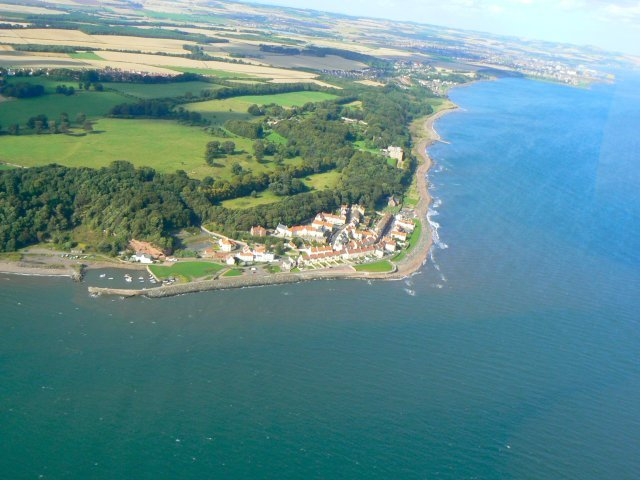
Coast of Wemyss (West Wemyss and Wemyss Castle in foreground, East Wemyss in background)

Wemyss (/wiːmz/ WEEMZ) is a civil parish on the south coast of Fife, Scotland, lying on the Firth of Forth. It is bounded on the north-east by the parish of Scoonie and the south-west by the parish of Kirkcaldy and Dysart and its length from south-west to north-east is about 6 miles. Inland it is bounded by Markinch and its greatest breadth is 2 1/4 miles.

The name of the parish is from the Scottish Gaelic Uaimheis meaning 'cave place', from uaimh, 'cave', and es, an obsolete Gaelic suffix meaning 'place of'. The parish gives its name to the family and Earls of Wemyss.

== Settlements ==
Parish of Wemyss

Nearly a dozen towns and villages have existed in Wemyss parish over the years, some now joined to form larger settlements:

- Buckhaven
- Denbeath
- East Coaltown
- East Wemyss
- Kirkland
- Innerleven
- Methil
- Methilhill
- Muiredge
- West Coaltown
- West Wemyss

The parish contains the towns of Methil and Buckhaven in the north, formerly constituting the burgh of Buckhaven and Methil. In the south are the villages of East Wemyss and West Wemyss, between which is sited Wemyss Castle, ancient seat of the Earls of Wemyss and their family.

== History ==
The district is of much archaeological and historic interest. On the shore to the north-east are two square towers which are supposed to have formed part of Macduff's Castle, and near them are the caves (weems, from the Gaelic, uamha) from which the district derives its name. Several of them contain archaic sculptures, of uncertain origin.

Coal mining was once the principal industry of the district, the coal being exported from the port of Methil. Its harbour was constructed by David, 2nd earl of Wemyss, and the town was a burgh of barony in 1662.

=== Parish history ===
A Parochial Board was established in 1845, which was superseded by a Parish Council in 1895. However, in 1891 the police burgh of Buckhaven and Methil was established, consisting of the towns of Buckhaven, Methil and Innerleven, which contained most of the population of the parish (8,000 out of 15,000 in 1901). Parish councils in Scotland were abolished in 1930 but civil parishes persist for census and other non-administrative purposes, while Buckhaven and Methil burgh was abolished in 1975

The civil parish of Wemyss contains the Community Council areas of Coaltown of Wemyss, West Wemyss, East Wemyss and McDuff, Buckhaven, Methilhill, and Methil.

Historically the parish church was located in East Wemyss, which was the kirk town of the parish, but with the great growth of population in the 19th century (as a result of the coal industry), additional ecclesiastical-only parishes were erected, beginning with Methil and West Wemyss. (Also churches were built for the non-established denominations). The former parish church is St. Mary's by the Sea, in East Wemyss and there has been a church on this site since the 12th century. Originally rectangular in plan, the church seems to have been virtually rebuilt in 1528, with further rework in 1792 and 1810. After the Reformation, the chancel became the Wemyss Aisle.

The church closed in 1976 with the congregation being united with St. George's, East Wemyss (itself united with St Adrian's in West Wemyss in 1973) and the church was converted to a house in 1985. Then in 2008 Buckhaven and Wemyss united as the Parish of Buckhaven and Wemyss, with services at St Adrian's (West Wemyss) and Buckhaven churches (St. George's was then closed). Alongside this united parish, there are several Church of Scotland ecclesiastic parishes in northern areas of the civil parish of Wemyss (covering Methil, Innerleven and Methilhill).

The civil parish has a population of 18,255 (in 2011) and its area is 4872 acres.
