= John Wemyss, 1st Earl of Wemyss =

17th-century Scottish nobleman and politician

John Wemyss, 1st Earl of Wemyss (1586–1649) was a Scottish politician.

He was a son of Sir John Wemyss and Margaret Douglas, a daughter of Sir William Douglas of Lochleven. His home was Wemyss Castle in Fife.

Around 1610 he acquired the estate of Raith from William Paton (of Ballilisk) minister of Dalgety in Fife.

Knighted in 1618, in 1625 Wemyss was created a Baronet of Nova Scotia in 1625, with a charter to the barony of New Wemyss in that province of Canada. In 1628 he was raised to the Peerage of Scotland as Lord Wemyss of Elcho, and in 1633 he was further honoured when he was made Lord Elcho and Methel and Earl of Wemyss, also in the Peerage of Scotland.

He was Lord High Commissioner to the General Assembly of the Church of Scotland, a Privy Councillor and one of the Committee of the Estates. Wemyss later supported the Parliament of Scotland against Charles I in the Wars of the Three Kingdoms, and died in 1649. He married Jane Gray (daughter of Patrick Gray and his second wife, Mary Stewart, daughter of Robert Stewart, 1st Earl of Orkney, the King's uncle) and was succeeded by his only son, David, the second Earl.

== Notes ==
Peerage of Scotland
New creation	Earl of Wemyss; 1633–1649	Succeeded by David Wemyss
New creation	Lord Wemyss of Elcho; 1628–1649	Succeeded by David Wemyss
Baronetage of Nova Scotia
New creation	Baronet (of Wemyss); 1625–1649	Succeeded by David Wemyss
