= Francis Wemyss-Charteris =

Scottish earl

Francis Wemyss Charteris (21 October 1723 – 24 August 1808) was a Scottish landowner who claimed to be 7th Earl of Wemyss.

== Life ==
Charteris was the second son of James Wemyss, 5th Earl of Wemyss and his wife Janet, daughter of the very wealthy Colonel Francis Charteris. He was born with the name Francis Wemyss but on 24 February 1732, he legally changed it to Francis Wemyss Charteris, adopting his mother's maiden name on the inheritance of the estates of his maternal grandfather Colonel Charteris. In a Haddingtonshire Sasine registered on 8 August 1792, No.576, Francis Charteris, Earl of Wemyss was seised in the barony of Newmilns, or Amisfield, Haddingtonshire, plus half of the barony of Morham and its lands, plus the grain mill of the monastery of Haddington called Abbey Mill.

His elder brother David, Lord Elcho, was implicated in the Jacobite rising of 1745, and was attainted in 1746. He died childless in 1787 and Charteris would have succeeded as seventh Earl but for the attainder. However, he still assumed the title.

In 1756 he commissioned Isaac Ware to build the monumental Amisfield House on the site purchased by his maternal grandmother, and named after her home estate of Amisfield. He further commissioned John Henderson to remodel the house in 1784, having purchased Gosford House in 1781 in which to reside during the construction works. When Amisfield House was ready for reoccupation Charteris commissioned Robert Adam to overhaul the entire design of Gosford House.

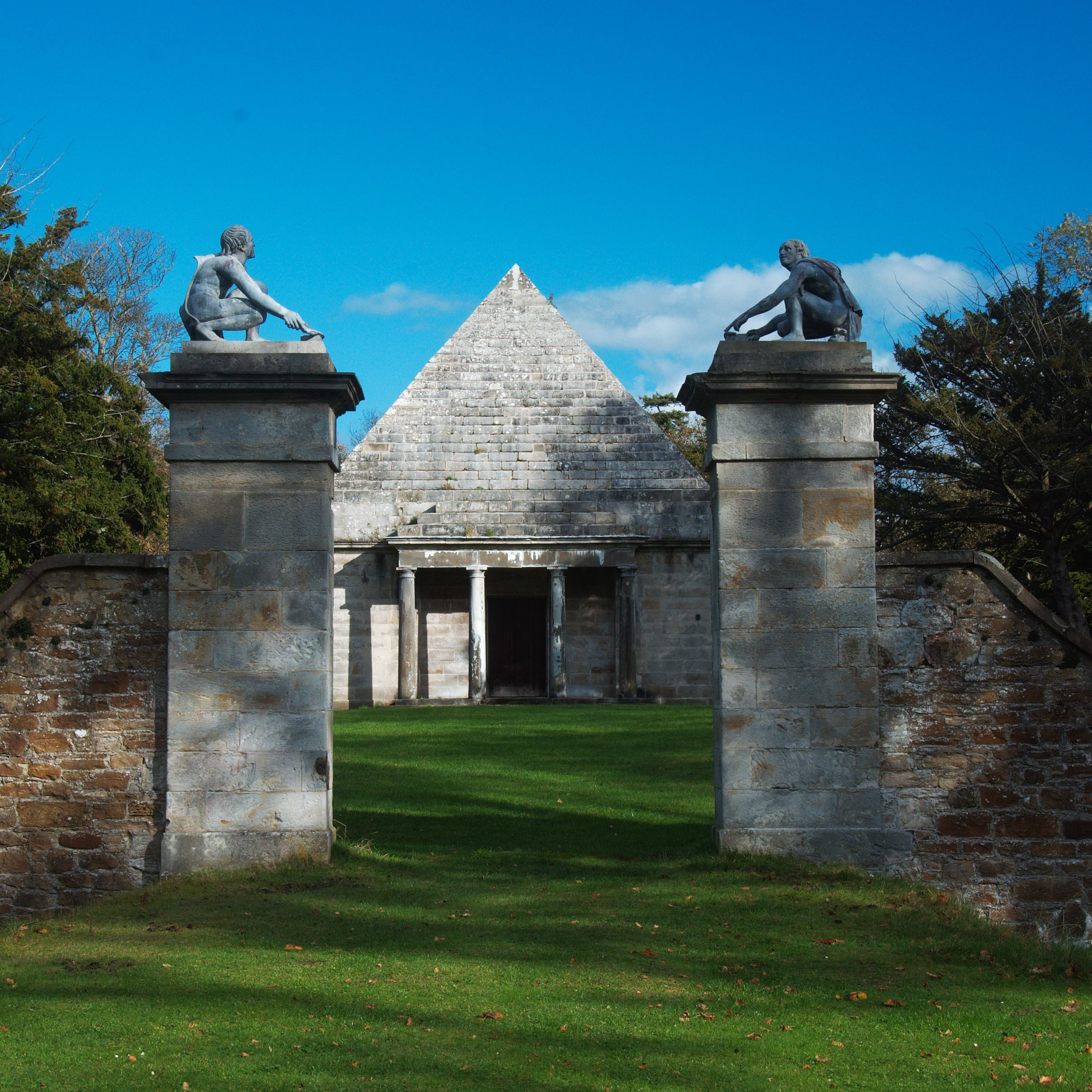
The grave of Francis Charteris at Gosford House

Charteris died in August 1808, aged 84 and is buried in the Wemyss Mausoleum (a huge stone pyramid) near Gosford House, the estate he had acquired in 1781 or 1784 (depending on the source). The Earl is the only member of the family to be buried within the mausoleum. His grandson Francis obtained a reversal of the attainder in 1826 and became the eighth Earl of Wemyss.

== Family ==
On 12 September 1745, he married Lady Katherine Gordon, daughter of the 2nd Duke of Gordon. They had five children:

- Frances Charteris (died 1848) who married Rev William Trail
- Francis Wemyss Charteris, styled Lord Elcho (1749–1808)
- Helen Charteris
- Walpole Charteris
- Anne Charteris

Masonic offices
Preceded by William Nisbet	Grand Master of the Grand Lodge of Scotland; 1747–1748	Succeeded by Hugh Seton
Peerage of Scotland
Preceded by David Wemyss	Earl of Wemyss; 1787–1808	Succeeded by Francis Charteris
