= James Wemyss, 5th Earl of Wemyss =

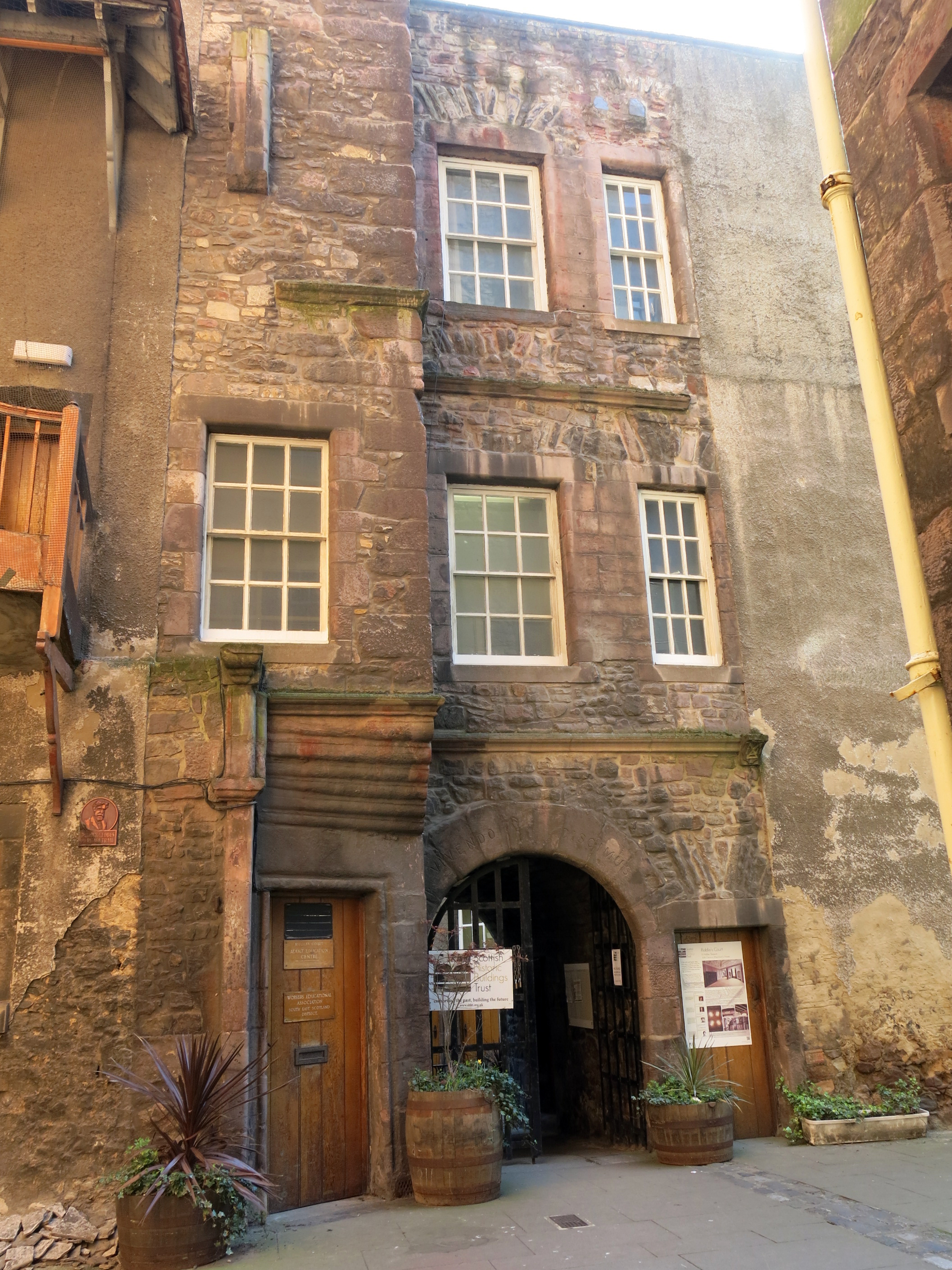
Riddle's Court in Edinburgh

James Wemyss, 5th Earl of Wemyss (30 August 1699 – 21 March 1756), was the son of David Wemyss, 4th Earl of Wemyss.

In Edinburgh Wemyss lived in Riddles Court off the Royal Mile which retains much of its 17th century interior.

On 17 September 1720, he married Janet Charteris, heiress of the great Colonel Francis Charteris, and they had four children:

- David Wemyss, 6th Earl of Wemyss (1721–1787)
- Francis Charteris, 7th Earl of Wemyss (1723–1808)
- James Wemyss (1726–1786)
- Frances Wemyss (died 1789)

In 1730, he was key to securing the release his father-in-law from Newgate Prison after he was sentenced to hang for the capital felony of rape.

His second son, Francis, the seventh Earl, legally changed his name to Charteris, his mother's maiden name, on his inheritance of Colonel Charteris's estates and fortune built upon gambling.

Masonic offices
Preceded by The Earl of Kilmarnock	Grand Master of the Grand Lodge of Scotland; 1743–1744	Succeeded by The Earl of Moray
Peerage of Scotland
Preceded by David Wemyss	Earl of Wemyss; 1720–1756	Succeeded by David Wemyss
