= Francis Charteris (rake) =

Scottish soldier and adventurer

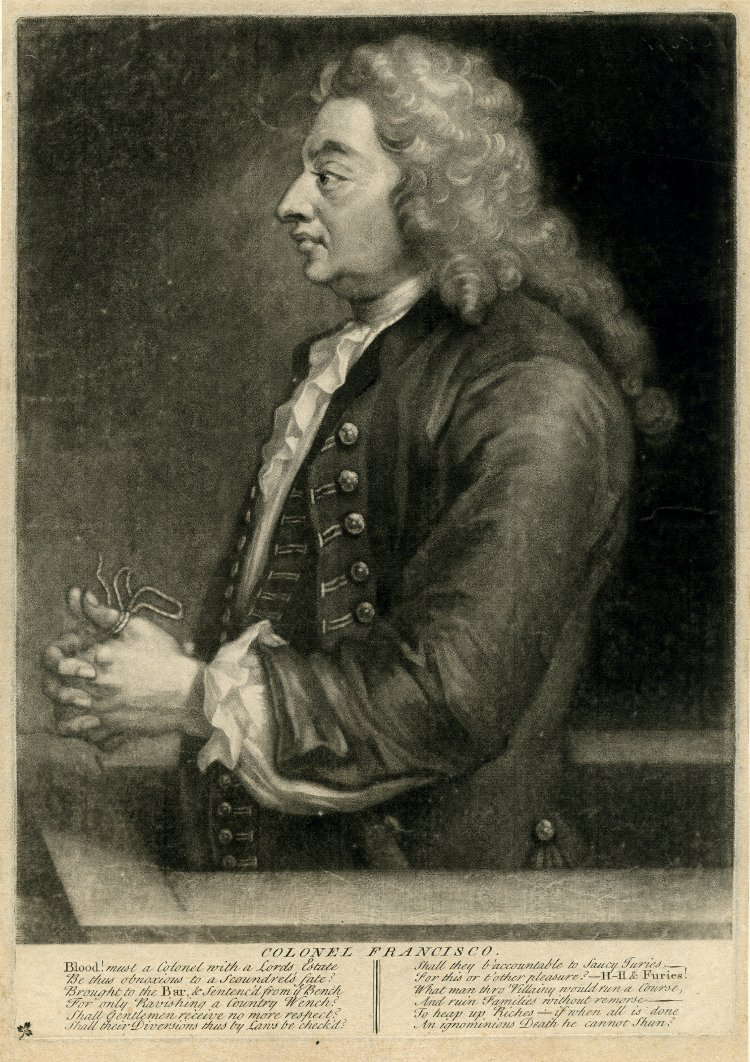
- Colonel Francis Charteris
- Born: 4 April 1675; Edinburgh, Scotland
- Died: 23 February 1732 (aged 56); Edinburgh, Scotland
- Burial place: Greyfriars Kirkyard
- Spouse: Helen Swinton
- Relatives: John Charteris, Mary, Sir Francis Kinloch, 1st Baronet
- Military career
- Allegiance: Scottish
- Rank: Colonel
- Nickname: The Rape-Master General
- Other work: Adventurer

Colonel Francis Charteris (baptised 4 April 1675 – 24 February 1732), nicknamed "The Rape-Master General", was a Scottish soldier and adventurer who earned a substantial sum of money through gambling and the South Sea Bubble. He was also a serial rapist who was convicted of raping a servant in 1730 and sentenced to death, but subsequently pardoned, before dying of natural causes shortly afterwards.

== Early life ==
Charteris was born at Edinburgh in about 1675, the son of John Charteris (died 1691 [?] dead by 1702), a magistrate, and his wife, Mary, who was possibly the daughter of Sir Francis Kinloch, 1st Baronet. His family were land-holders and owned property in Amisfield, near Dumfries. Even before his conviction, he was notorious and despised by many in London as an archetypal rake. He had a serial military career, being dismissed from service four times; the third time in the Southern Netherlands by the Duke of Marlborough, for cheating at cards, and the fourth time by Parliament for accepting bribes. Despite his military dismissals, he amassed a considerable fortune.

== Personal life ==
Charteris made Sally Salisbury his mistress, but abandoned her c. 1704, when she was 14 years old. Following her abandonment, Salisbury was taken in by a bawd, Mother Wisebourne, whose house in Covent Garden was among the most exclusive and expensive brothels of the time.

Charteris married Helen Swinton, the daughter of Alexander Swinton, Lord Mersington; their daughter Janet married James Wemyss, 5th Earl of Wemyss, in 1720, and his grandson, Francis Wemyss Charteris, 7th Earl of Wemyss, adopted his mother's maiden name in 1732 when he inherited his grandfather's estates.

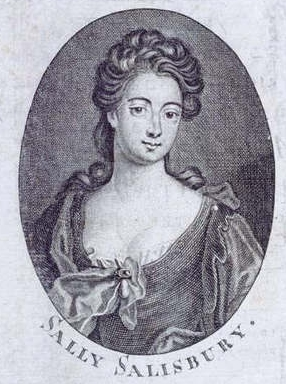
Charteris' mistress, prostitute Sally Salisbury

== Rape of Anne Bond ==
Charteris would send his servants out through the countryside to recruit women for him to have sex with. The methods and enticements he used made him disliked by the poor in some parts of England. His reputation preceded his trial for raping a servant named Anne Bond. When Bond was hired, on 24 October 1729, she was informed that her employer was "Colonel Harvey" for fear that his reputation would put off his prospective employee. Charteris had a number of contacts who regularly hired women to work as servants, who would then be trapped in the house and repeatedly "urged" to have sex with him. When Bond began to work, she was immediately besieged by "Harvey's" advances, along with offers of money; but she refused. On her third day of employment, Anne realised that Harvey was in fact Colonel Francis Charteris and requested to leave. This request was refused, and staff were positioned to prevent her from escaping.

The next morning, 10 November, Charteris attacked and raped Bond. There were no witnesses, and Charteris' servants in the next room later testified that they heard nothing. When Bond told Charteris she was going to the authorities over the crime, he ordered servants to whip her and take her belongings and throw her out the door, telling them that she had stolen money from him. With assistance from Mary Parsons, perhaps a former employer, Bond brought a complaint for the misdemeanour of "assault with intent to commit rape." The Middlesex grand jury originally found grounds to proceed with this charge but later upgraded the charge to the capital felony of rape.

On 27 February 1730, Charteris was tried for rape at the Old Bailey. The trial was a media sensation. The defence attacked the virtue and motives of the complainant, accusing her of compliance, prostitution, theft and extortion. Many of Charteris' witnesses and documents were shown to be false, and the jury quickly found him guilty. On 2 March, he was sentenced to death and held in Newgate Prison.

The Earl of Egmont wrote in his diary 'All the world agree he deserved to be hanged long ago, but they differ whether on this occasion'; while Fog's Weekly Journal of 14 March 1730 reported 'We hear no Rapes have been committed for three Weeks past. Colonel Francis Charteris is still in Newgate.' On 10 April 1730, George II granted him a royal pardon after a campaign that included the Scottish Lord Advocate Duncan Forbes, who rented a house from Charteris in Edinburgh, and Anne Bond herself, possibly prompted by the promise of an annuity.

As a convicted felon, his property should have been forfeit under the doctrine of attainder, but he petitioned the King for its return. In composition for his offence, he paid substantial sums to the Sheriffs of London and Middlesex. He was also suspected of having given substantial gifts to various important individuals. Jonathan Swift commented on Charteris in several poems. In Lines on the Death of Dr. Swift (1731), he explains "Chartres" as, "a most infamous, vile scoundrel, grown from a foot-boy, or worse, to a prodigious fortune both in England and Scotland: he had a way of insinuating himself into all Ministers under every change, either as pimp, flatterer, or informer. He was tried at seventy [sic] for a rape, and came off by sacrificing a great part of his fortune" (note to l. 189).

== Death ==
In 1732, Chateris died from natural causes in Edinburgh, possibly from a condition caused by his stay in Newgate Prison. Shortly before he died, he was said to have stated that he would pay £150,000 to anybody who could prove to him that there was no hell (equivalent to £32,058,000 in 2025). He was buried in Greyfriars Kirkyard; his coffin was attacked on its way to the graveyard, and it is said that dead cats were thrown into his grave. Upon his death, John Arbuthnot published "Epitaph on Don Francisco" in The London Magazine (April 1732). In it, he wrote that Charteris was a man,

...who, having done, every Day of his Life,

Something worthy of a Gibbet,

Was once condemned to one
For what he had not done.

== In literature ==
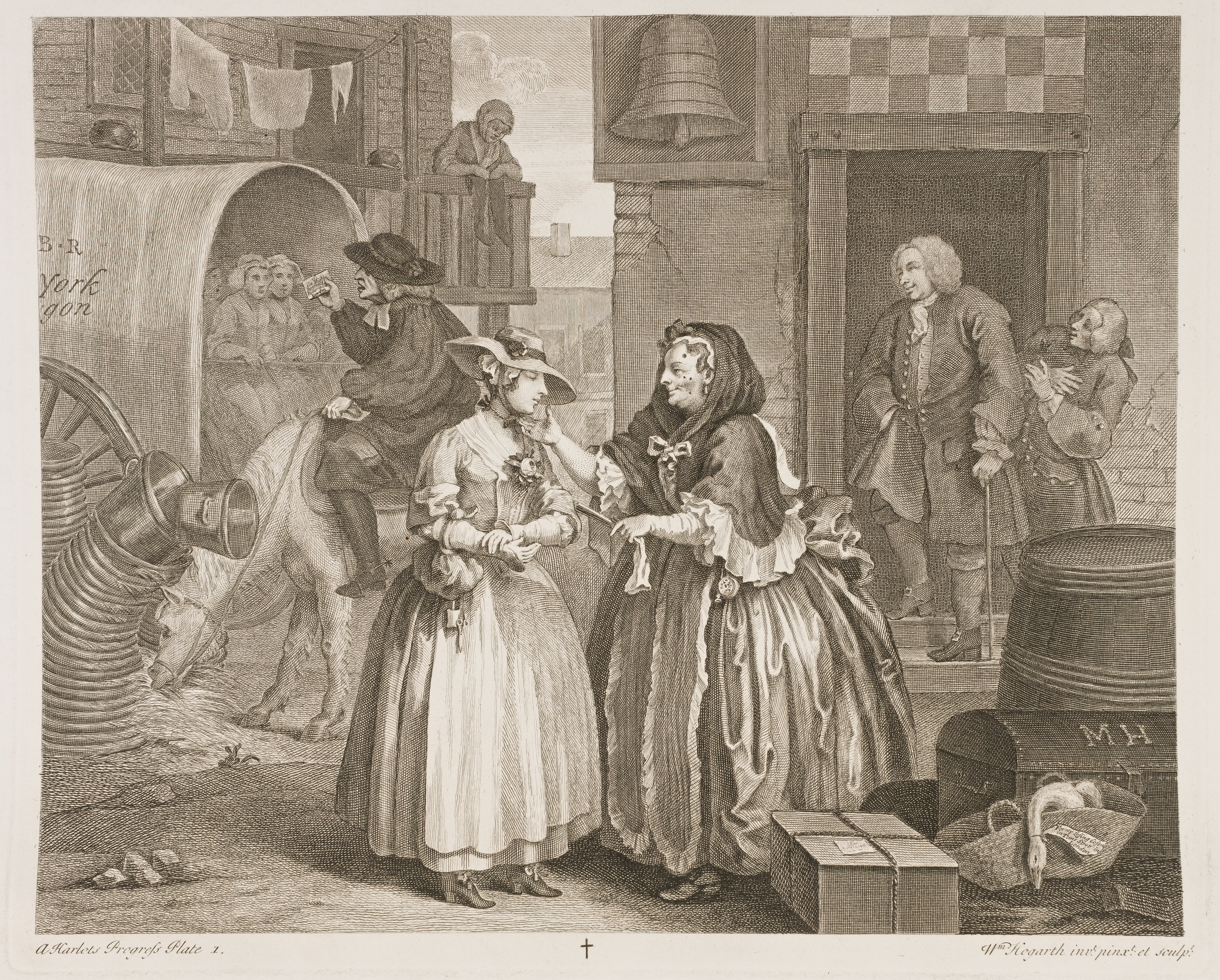
William Hogarth's A Harlot's Progress, plate 1, showing Molly's arrival in London, with Colonel Francis Charteris and "Handy Jack" leering in the background, while a syphilitic madame Elizabeth Needham in the foreground procures her first

Charteris was the inspiration for characters in William Hogarth's paintings A Rake's Progress and A Harlot's Progress (where he is represented as the fat lecher in the first plate), and in Fanny Hill. He was condemned by Alexander Pope in his Moral Essay III, written in 1733. Parallels were drawn between Charteris' sexual excesses and the greed of politicians such as Robert Walpole. Charteris may also have been the source of Leslie Charteris' adopted surname.
