= Wemyss Castle =

Castle in Fife, Scotland

Coordinates: 56.1442°N 3.0808°W

Designations

Inventory of Gardens and Designed Landscapes in Scotland
- Official name: Wemyss Castle
- Designated: 30 March 2005
- Reference no.: GDL00384

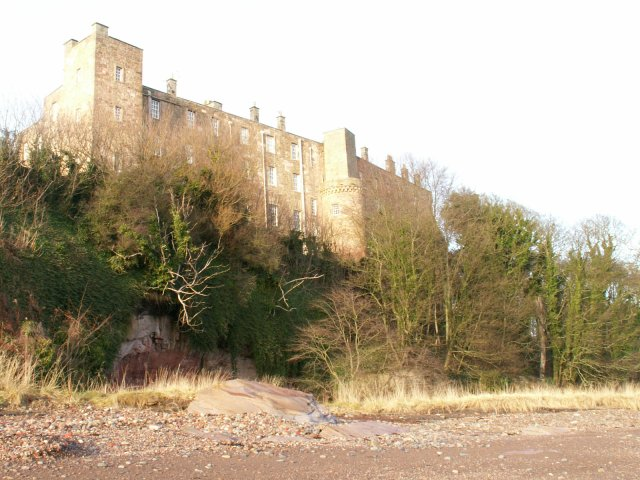
seen from the foreshore.

Wemyss Castle (pronounced [weems]) is situated in Wemyss on the sea cliffs between the villages of East Wemyss and West Wemyss in Fife, Scotland. Wemyss Castle is considered to be a multi-period building, and today's castle includes many elements from former periods such as the 15th-century tower and the 19th-century stables and gatepiers.

== History ==
Accounts date the construction of the castle to 1421 when Sir John Wemyss decided to build a fortified castle to replace one destroyed by the Duke of Rothesay at Kilconquhar in 1402. The castle is thus the ancient seat of the Earls of Wemyss and their families. Historically, the castle is perhaps best known as the location where Mary, Queen of Scots, met her future husband Lord Darnley, on 17 February 1565.

The court of James VI stayed at Wemyss Castle in July 1583. On 11 May 1590 a party of Danish commissioners led by Peder Munk and the Scottish lawyer John Skene stayed at Wemyss Castle. Their task was to view and take sasine of Falkland Palace and Dunfermline Palace and Linlithgow Palace, the properties given to Anne of Denmark by James VI as a "morning gift".

In April 1591 King James had Lilias (or Sophia) Ruthven, a daughter of William Ruthven, 1st Earl of Gowrie, shut away in Wemyss Castle to prevent her marrying Ludovic Stewart, 2nd Duke of Lennox. Lennox managed to get his bride out of the castle and marry her at Dunkeld, and after 10 days the king allowed the couple to come to court.

In 1592 Sir John Wemyss of Wemyss provided a refuge at the castle for the queen's Danish lady-in-waiting Margaret Vinstarr whose partner John Wemyss of Logie had plotted with Francis Stewart, 5th Earl of Bothwell against the king. The incident is celebrated in a ballad, The Laird o Logie.

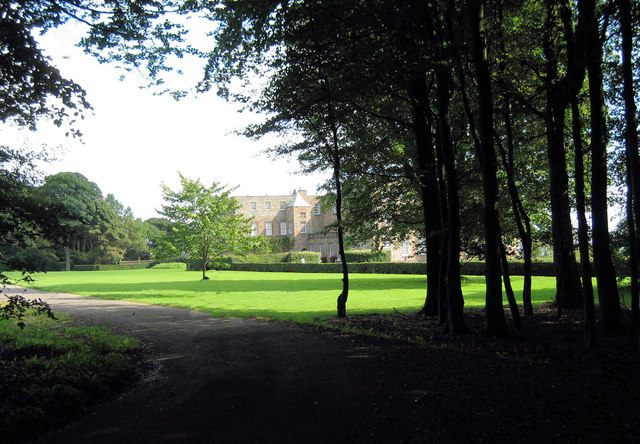
Wemyss Castle Seen from the front

John Wemyss was obliged to keep prisoners for the king at Wemyss, including in 1597 Archie Armstrong of Whitehaugh from the Scottish borders. Wemyss and other Lairds complained about this duty, and in April James VI wrote to him and asked him to bring Armstrong as a prisoner to be kept at Falkland Palace instead.

In the 1890s the nearby Coaltown of Wemyss was established as an estate village on land belonging to Wemyss Castle, in order to house mineworkers employed in several coal mines in the area.

== Architecture ==
Wemyss is an imposing castle sitting high atop cliffs with a view over the Firth of Forth. Two particular points of interest are that one of the towers from an earlier building has been re-used, first as a windmill and later as a dovecote. There is also an oval-shaped dungeon within the castle, connected to the building by a passage.

== Ghostlore ==
Some believe Wemyss possesses, like a number of Scottish castles, a "Green Lady". Folk beliefs in Scotland and Britain have traditionally associated the colour green with misfortune. Wearing green at a wedding was considered particularly unlucky, with a Scottish saying recorded in 1892 explaining that "Married in May, and kirked in green / Baith bride and bridegroom winna lang be seen". In the case of Wemyss, the ghost is that of a young woman wearing a trailing dress of green silk which rustles as she floats along the corridors within the castle. A news report in 2007 suggested that sightings had ceased in recent years.

== Notable residents ==
- James Hay Erskine Wemyss
- Rosslyn Wemyss, 1st Baron Wester Wemyss
