= Joan Wyndham =

British writer and memoirist

Joan Olivia Wyndham (11 October 1921, in East Knoyle, Wiltshire – 8 April 2007, in London) was a British writer and memoirist who rose to literary prominence late in life through the diaries she had kept more than 40 years earlier, which were an account of her romantic adventures during the Second World War, when she was an attractive teenager who had strayed into London's Bohemian set. Her literary reputation rests on Love Lessons (1985) and Love Is Blue (1986), two selections from her diaries which led one critic to call her "a latterday Pepys in camiknickers."

== Life ==
Wyndham's mother, Iris Bennett, was the daughter of British diplomat Andrew Percy Bennett and his Romanian wife Winifred. Winifred was later connected to senior Army officer Sir John French. Iris married Guy Richard Charles Wyndham (1896–1948), son of Guy Wyndham, from the aristocratic Wyndham family of Petworth House, West Sussex. Her early years were spent in the Wiltshire countryside at the family residence, Clouds House. Her parents' marriage was failing by the time Joan was born, and they separated when she was four. After the divorce, mother and daughter went to live in west London, at 22 Evelyn Gardens, off Fulham Road, and sought solace in devout Roman Catholicism. Together, they attended Mass every day and confession once a week. Joan was sent to a Catholic boarding school, and developed a passion for the theatre and later art.

After her father was caught In flagrante delicto with the Marchioness of Queensbury, he followed the custom of the period by registering at a hotel in Brighton where he arranged for a private detective to photograph him in bed with a prostitute, rather than embarrass his lover. (This ruse provided photographic evidence of adultery, needed to obtain a divorce according to the laws of the day.) He later worked as a correspondent for The Sunday Times and was sent to the south-west Asia. In May 1948, while covering the 1948 Arab-Israeli War, he was killed by Israeli machine-gun fire in Jerusalem while photographing an Arab advance from a forward Arab Legion post.

In 1938 Joan won a place at the Royal Academy of Dramatic Arts (RADA), but the impending war forced RADA to close for the duration. The 17-year-old Wyndham soon volunteered to train as a nurse and in 1941 she joined the Women's Auxiliary Air Force (WAAF). During the war she was posted to: Preston (RAF Barton Hall), Stanmore (RAF Bentley Priory), Inverness (RAF Inverness) and Watnall (RAF Watnall). She made trips to London where she got to know Dylan Thomas, Julian MacLaren-Ross, M.J. Tambimuttu and other such bohemians.

Shortly after the war, she married Maurice Rowdon, with whom she had a daughter, Clare. When her husband took up a lecturership in Baghdad, Wyndham accompanied him and remained in Iraq for two years. An affair with their London lodger, Shura Shivarg, a Jewish academic of Russian descent who had grown up in pre-Communist China, led to an amicable divorce and second marriage, which also produced a daughter, Camilla.

Following a stint as a restaurant critic for What's On? (a precursor of Time Out), she moved to Oxford, where she set up the city's first espresso bar. Gravitating back to London, she worked as a sub-editor for Housewife magazine. In the 1960s she ran a hippie restaurant on Portobello Road and catered for many of the major pop festivals. In the 1970s she worked as a restaurant critic for Gault Millau and cooked for the actors at the Royal Court Theatre.

Her younger daughter found her wartime diaries and encouraged her mother to edit and publish them. They were eventually acquired by William Heinemann, Ltd. and released in 1985 under the title Love Lessons, and followed by a 1986 sequel, Love Is Blue.

Love Lessons was read for BBC Radio 4 in ten instalments in February 1999, by Prunella Scales. Love Lessons was again adapted for BBC Radio 4 in five instalments in December 2003, with Emilia Fox as Joan.

== Death ==
Joan Wyndham died of cancer in 2007, aged 85, survived by her two daughters. Her first and second husbands were still alive at the time of her death.

== Works ==
- Wyndham, Joan (1985). Love Lessons: A Wartime Diary. London: Heinemann. ISBN 0-434-87860-X. OCLC 12973139.
- Wyndham, Joan (1986). Love is Blue: A Wartime Diary. London: Heinemann. ISBN 0-434-87861-8. OCLC 15593366.
- Wyndham, Joan (1992). Anything Once. London: Sinclair-Stevenson. ISBN 1-85619-129-X. OCLC 26317107.
- Wyndham, Joan (2004). Dawn Chorus. London: Virago. ISBN 1-84408-152-4. OCLC 56658550.
