= The Wyndham Sisters: Lady Elcho, Mrs. Adeane, and Mrs. Tennant =

Painting by John Singer Sargent

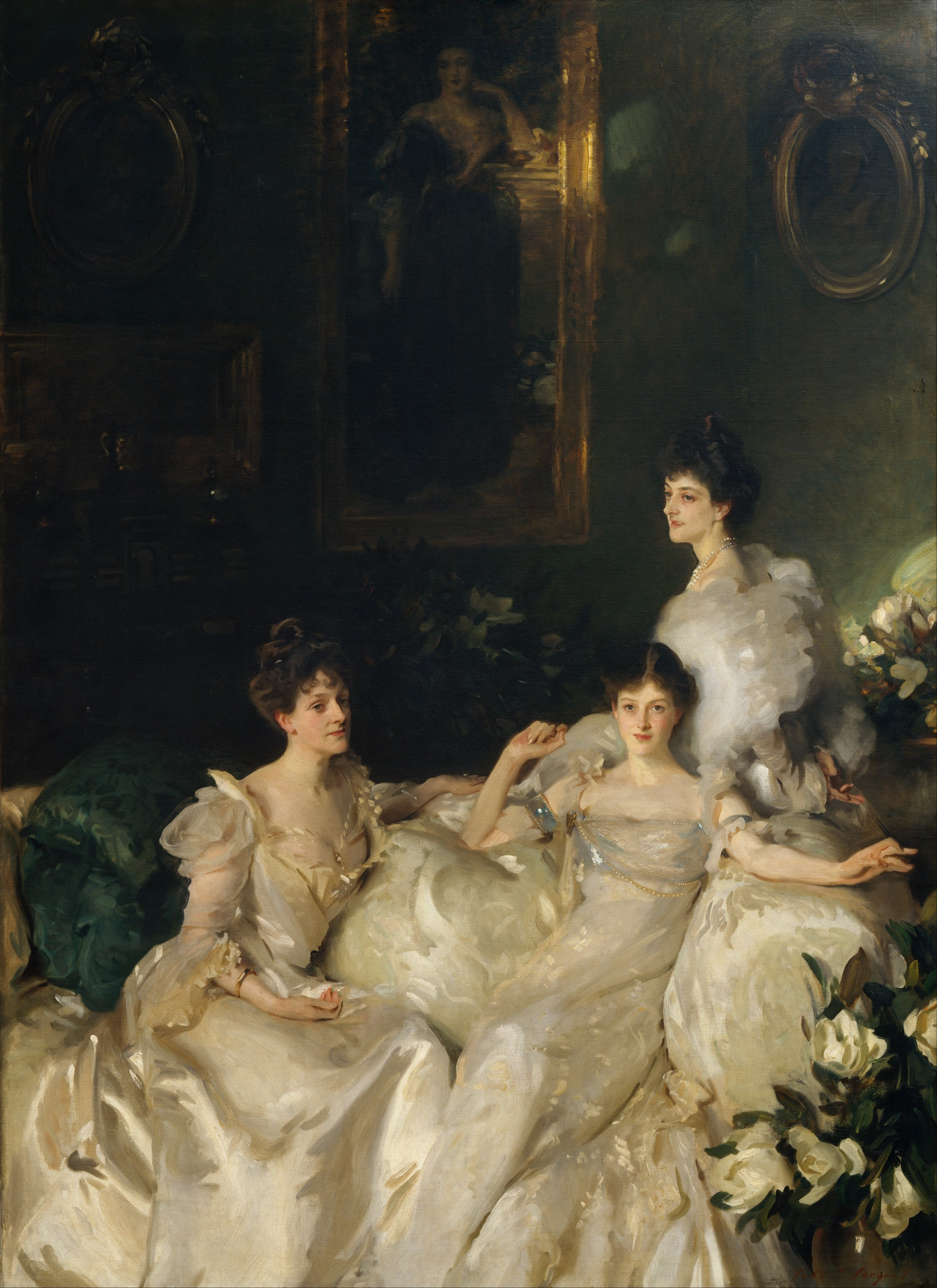
- Artist: John Singer Sargent
- Year: 1899
- Dimensions: 292.1 cm × 213.7 cm (115.0 in × 84.1 in)
- Location: Metropolitan Museum of Art, New York City, New York, United States

The Wyndham Sisters: Lady Elcho, Mrs. Adeane, and Mrs. Tennant is an 1899 painting by John Singer Sargent. It is part of the collection of the Metropolitan Museum of Art. The painting was hailed by the critics and dubbed "The Three Graces" by the Prince of Wales (later King Edward VII).

== Painting ==
The three daughters of the Honourable Percy Wyndham, a British politician and younger son of George Wyndham, 1st Baron Leconfield, appear in this monumental canvas. From the left, they are Madeline Adeane (1869–1941), Pamela Tennant (1871–1928), and Lady Elcho (1862–1937).

Sargent painted them in the drawing room of their family's residence on Belgrave Square. Seen on the wall above them is George Frederic Watts' portrait of their mother, establishing their genealogy and reminding viewers of Sargent's ties to older artists.

Described as a "monumental canvas" by the Met, the painting's size is 292cm x 214cm.

== Background ==
Percy Wyndham commissioned the painting in December 1898, agreeing on a price of £2,000. Sargent first visited the sisters and their parents at 44 Belgrave Square in February 1899, where the sittings took place in the large drawing room. According to Claudia Renton "none of the sisters seems to have felt there was anything pointed in Sargent choosing a pose of indolence".

Sittings took place in the early months of 1899, and resumed in the Spring of 1900. The painting was first shown at the 1900 Royal Academy Summer Exhibition, with The Times calling it "The greatest picture which has appeared for many years on the walls of the Royal Academy". It was hung in the billiards room at Clouds House, but was often sent off for public viewing.

In 1927 Richard Wyndham sold off the painting (at the peak of Sargent's popularity) to the Metropolitan Museum of Art for £20,000 when he moved to the French Riviera and let Clouds off to rent.

== See also ==
- 1899 in art
- List of works by John Singer Sargent
