= UK Addiction Treatment Centres =

Private addiction treatment firm

- Type: Private
- Industry: Addiction treatment
- Founded: 2012
- Founder: Daniel Gerrard
- Headquarters: United Kingdom
- Website: www.ukat.co.uk

UK Addiction Treatment Centres (UKAT) is a private provider of addiction treatment services in the United Kingdom. It is recognised as the largest private addiction treatment provider in the UK, operating more than 240 residential beds across nine facilities. The facilities provide treatment for alcohol, gambling, and substance use disorders such as cocaine dependence, cannabis use disorder and eating disorders. The organisation delivers a full span of extended care, from medically supervised detoxification and primary rehabilitation to secondary treatment programmes and sober living housing. UKAT’s centres are regulated by the Care Quality Commission (CQC) and collectively host the country’s largest addiction recovery alumni network.

== Services ==
UKAT offers rehabilitative programmes with private or shared rooms for a 7-day, 14-day or 28-day treatment, including a medically assisted detox. Patients typically follow the 12-step program, alongside holistic treatments and recovery workshops.

The rehab centre locations include Sanctuary Lodge (Essex), Primrose Lodge (Surrey), Banbury Lodge (Oxfordshire), Liberty House (Bedfordshire), Recovery Lighthouse (Sussex), Oasis Runcorn (Cheshire), Oasis Recovery (West Yorkshire), Linwood House (South Yorkshire), Providence Projects (Bournemouth) and Bayberry Rehab (Warwickshire).

== Funding ==
In 2018, UKAT secured investment from a US-based private equity fund, reflecting both the increasing demand for high-quality addiction treatment services and the decline in public sector funding. Public health budgets for drug and alcohol services were cut further over the following years, with reports showing that by 2021, funding had fallen by over a third, leaving thousands of young people without access to treatment. By 2023, the crisis had only deepened, with frontline services struggling to support those most in need amid devastating cuts. Against this backdrop, UKAT continued to grow, and in September 2024, ownership transferred to London-based private equity firm Sullivan Street Partners. This move marked the next stage in UKAT’s expansion and long-term commitment to accessible, effective care, strengthening its repertoire as the need for addiction treatment continued to rise.

== Admission statistics ==
In 2017, admissions for alcohol addiction reached record highs, and admissions for Xanax addictions doubled in 2018. Admissions for OTC drug addiction increased 22%. In 2018, UKAT has admitted 48 people for either codeine or benzodiazepine addiction, compared to just 26 for cannabis and 17 for gambling addiction.

== See also ==
- Action on Addiction
