= Olivia Wyndham =

British photographer

Olivia Madeline Grace Mary Wyndham (30 November 1897 – 1967) was a British society photographer and a member of the 1920s socialite group known as the bright young things.

The daughter of Colonel Guy Percy Wyndham, C.B., M.V.O. (a member of the Souls, the group congregated at his parents' house, Clouds, in Wiltshire) and his wife Edwina Virginia Joanna, daughter of Rev. Frederick Fitzpatrick, Olivia Wyndham was the great-great granddaughter of the 3rd Earl of Egremont and great-granddaughter of the 1st Baron Leconfield, sister of millionaire (Guy) Richard "Dick" (Charles) Wyndham, and a distant relative of Oscar Wilde. Having founded a studio with him ("M Studio" in Fitzroy Square) Wyndham held an exhibition with the American Curtis Moffat in June 1927. Regular subjects for Moffat and Wyndham were the Sitwells, Tallulah Bankhead and Cecil Beaton. Wyndham was stated to have been an inspiration to photographer Barbara Ker-Seymer, who took over Wyndham's studio when the latter went to America.

Having married the American Howland Spencer in 1930 (they divorced in 1931), she lived with her lover, Edna Lewis Thomas, a successful African-American actress, and Edna's husband, Lloyd Thomas. In the 1930s, Wyndham was painted by the artist Joseph Delaney.

Her niece was the writer Joan Wyndham, and her half-brother was the journalist, editor and writer Francis Wyndham, literary executor to Jean Rhys.

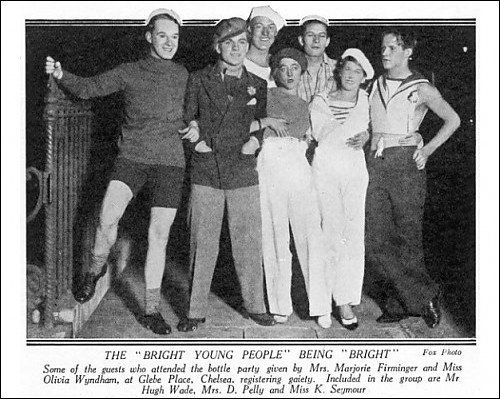
Marjorie Firminger and Olivia Wyndham's party at Glebe Place

== The Bright Young Things ==
While living in London, Olivia's involvement in the world of the bright young things was largely related to parties. Olivia's most famous party, which took place in 1929, has retrospectively become known as the 'sailor party'. A photograph from this event was published in the newspaper The Bystander on 30 October 1929, capturing a number of attendees including Barbara Ker-Seymer, Mrs Dennis Pelly (née Elizabeth Ponsonby) and Hugh Wade. This party exemplified the trend for sailor style that fascinated queer and bohemian circles in 1920s and 1930s Europe.

== Relationship with Edna Thomas ==
In around 1930, Olivia moved to New York City. She was introduced to Black society by heiress A'lelia Walker and met the actress Edna Thomas, with whom she was promptly infatuated. It took 6 months for Olivia to win Edna over - initially Edna had "avoided her because white women are unfaithful". Upon the realisation that Olivia was serious about her, Edna recalled: "[Olivia] finally came to my house and I had the most exciting sex experience of my life. It has gone on for five years because it's so satisfactory." They lived together for decades after this, with Edna's husband Lloyd as a friend and housemate. In 1940, The New York Amsterdam News reported that Olivia was "one of Harlem's most colourful personalities whose future is all wrapped up in her adopted community."
