= Harold Sherwood Spencer =

American writer (1890–1957)

- Born: April 12, 1890; Superior, Wisconsin, U.S.
- Died: August 26, 1957 (aged 67); The Bahamas
- Occupations: naval officer; soldier; writer
- Years active: 1914–1923
- Notable work: The Cult of the Clitoris; Democracy or Shylocracy

Harold Sherwood Spencer (April 12, 1890 – August 26, 1957), also known as Howland Spencer, was an American writer and anti-homosexuality and antisemitic activist during and after World War I. He was closely associated with Noel Pemberton Billing and Lord Alfred Douglas.

== Early life ==
Harold Spencer was born in Wisconsin in 1890, the son of Helene Sherwood and attorney Albert Manford Spencer. He studied at the United States Naval Academy in Annapolis, where he was known for his active cultural interests. He resigned from the Naval Academy in December 1910 to take a position with the British consular service. Shortly after leaving he married a countess who was nearly twice his age, earning him the press nickname "boy bridegroom". The relationship was short lived: after a "stormy encounter in a New York hotel", the couple separated. He subsequently travelled widely with the rank of midshipman, and worked occasionally as a war correspondent.

He volunteered to serve in the British Army during World War I. On 18 September 1915, he was commissioned into the Royal Irish Fusiliers as a second lieutenant (on probation). He rose to the rank of captain, and was awarded the Order of the White Eagle (5th class) by the King of Serbia. He served on three fronts and became involved with the British Secret Service. However, his increasing obsession with the idea that the Germans were conspiring to sexually corrupt British civilians led to his being invalided out of the army on grounds of mental instability, diagnosed with "paranoid delusional insanity". He relinquished his commission on the grounds of ill health on 16 October 1917, and was granted the honorary rank of captain.

== Writings ==
=== Homophobic activity ===
He was soon writing for the journal Imperialist, founded by Noel Pemberton Billing. In 1918 he convinced Billing to publish an article which claimed that 47,000 Britons were being blackmailed by Germans to "propagate evils which all decent men thought had perished in Sodom and Lesbia". It was said that names were listed in the "Berlin Black Book" of the "Mbret of Albania". A second article, attacking the actress Maud Allan for her alleged association with the conspiracy, led to a sensational libel case, at which Spencer stood as a witness for Billing. Spencer lied in court, claiming to have obtained evidence of German and Austrian plans to blackmail British citizens while working for an Austrian aristocrat in Albania before the war. Billing won the case.

=== Antisemitic activity ===
In addition to its attacks on alleged homosexuals, the Imperialist regularly suggested that leading members of the British establishment were Jewish and that "the ruling and representing of Britain has become a close tribal affair". Spencer published Democracy or Shylocracy (1918), an antisemitic tract which claimed to be "A Brief for Men and Women Who Labour and Who Sacrifice to Make the World Safe for Democracy, Only to Find Themselves Enslaved by Capitalism and Their Earnings Controlled by Monopolists". The book argued that Jewish leaders had coordinated the Russian revolution and other recent events in world history. Spencer argued that Jews were an innately nomadic people "baked by the sun in the dry burning climate of the great deserts of North Africa, Arabia and Asia Minor...The desert crept into their hearts, and so at all times they were filled with the spirit of the sandy wastes".

The book was published in several editions, later being issued by an organisation called The Britons with the added subtitle "shall the Jew win?". The 1922 third edition included a preface written by John Henry Clarke, author of England Under the Heel of the Jew.

=== Libel cases ===
In 1920 Spencer became closely associated with Lord Alfred Douglas, who was increasingly obsessed by antisemitic conspiracy theories and who had also testified in the Billing trial. Douglas and Spencer worked together on the journal Plain English in which their theories were published. Spencer and Douglas circulated the claim that Lord Kitchener had been murdered by Jews to prolong the war and that Jewish businessman Ernest Cassel had conspired with Winston Churchill to circulate false information about the Battle of Jutland in order to make money by stock speculations. Douglas and Spencer fell out when Douglas discovered that Spencer had been lying about some of his claims. On 16 October 1921, Douglas resigned as editor, and Spencer took over. Douglas wrote, "When I left the paper, I was very angry. I thought I had been badly treated, and Captain Spencer and I had a violent quarrel."

In 1922 Spencer attacked the painter Sigismund Goetze in an article in Plain English. Goetze had recently completed a series of paintings depicting the history of the British Empire. Spencer called him "a foreign Jew" who was "an alien in Common Law and a perpetual enemy of this Christian empire". Though of partial German-Jewish descent, Goetze was born in London and was a Christian. He sued Spencer for libel. Spencer was convicted and sentenced to six months imprisonment. Spencer was deprived of his army rank on 31 January 1922 as a result of his conviction.

Shortly afterwards, Douglas published a pamphlet called The Murder of Lord Kitchener and the Truth about the Battle of Jutland and the Jews, in which he repeated his earlier accusations against Churchill. Churchill, who had previously opted to ignore Douglas and Spencer, was provoked into action. Douglas was arrested and charged with libel in November 1923. At the trial Spencer's lies were brought into evidence, contributing to Douglas's own conviction. He too was sentenced to six months. Shortly after Spencer's release he was re-arrested. He was convicted and fined for what was described as "disgusting behaviour".

== Later years ==
In 1926, Spencer filed for bankruptcy in accordance with the Bankruptcy Act 1914. In 1930 he married British socialite Olivia Wyndham, daughter of Lieutenant-Colonel Guy Wyndham. They divorced the following year. 1931, he was married to Emeline Harriman, widow of Stephen Henry Olin and daughter of Oliver Harriman. He owned a 500-acre estate called Krum Elbow in Lloyd, New York, on the Hudson River, directly opposite the Hyde Park estate of president Franklin D. Roosevelt, who he claimed was a distant cousin. In the 1930s he was involved in a public feud with Roosevelt, whose policies he disagreed with, claiming Roosevelt usurped the name 'Krum Elbow' for part his own estate. In 1938 Spencer sold his estate to African American preacher Father Divine to serve as a "heaven" for his followers.

Spencer later moved to The Bahamas, where he died on August 27, 1957, at the age of 67.
