= The Other Garden =

1988 historical novella by Francis Wyndham

- Author: Francis Wyndham
- Cover artist: Jane Human
- Language: English
- Subject: World War II; Home front; Village life; Eccentrics
- Genre: Historical fiction; Novella
- Set in: Wiltshire, England
- Publisher: Jonathan Cape
- Publication date: 7 March 1988
- Media type: Print (Hardcover)
- Pages: 104
- Award: Whitbread First Novel Award (1987)
- ISBN: 978-0224024754

The Other Garden is a 1988 historical novella and the debut novel of the English journalist, novelist, editor, and literary scout Francis Wyndham. Set against the backdrop of the home front in Wiltshire, England, during the outbreak of the Second World War, the story follows the bittersweet and unconventional friendship between a teenage narrator and an eccentric older woman in a quiet rural village.

The book was critically acclaimed, winning the 1987 Whitbread First Novel Award and being shortlisted for the overall Whitbread Book of the Year.

== Background ==
The Other Garden draws heavily on Francis Wyndham's personal upbringing and experiences on the British home front during the Second World War. Like his unnamed narrator, Wyndham grew up in Wiltshire, England, which serves as the physical and atmospheric blueprint for the novel's rural setting.

The narrative's focus on individuals who flout societal expectations reflects Wyndham's lifelong fascination with social non-conformists and rebels against traditional British upper-class conventions. Additionally, the book's pivotal medical subplot mirrors Wyndham's own life; during the war, he was drafted into the British Army but was subsequently discharged after contracting tuberculosis—the exact illness that afflicts the character of Kay Demarest.

Wyndham's decision to focus on the psychological isolation of the home front rather than a combat narrative aligns with his broader literary ethos. Having spent his career editing and championing marginalised or intensely personal voices—most notably as the literary executor for Jean Rhys—he utilised his debut long-form fiction to explore the quiet, domestic cruelties and eccentricities of the wartime British class system.

== Plot ==
Set in a rural Wiltshire village in the late summer of 1939, the narrative is recounted by an unnamed, introspective teenage boy. The plot focuses on his growing bond with Kay Demarest, a bohemian, non-conforming woman in her mid-thirties who lives with her wealthy, distant parents, Sybil and Charlie. Deeply disappointed by Kay's lack of social ambition, marital status, and career prospects, her parents openly treat her like an "unwanted parcel" while focusing their familial pride on her handsome brother, Sandy, a glamorous Group Captain in the Royal Air Force. To evade the constant hostility in her household, Kay routinely retreats to "the other garden"—a formal, secluded plot of land kept by the narrator's family—where she sunbathes and confides in the young narrator. As the Second World War breaks out, the isolation of the English home front deepens. While the war brings global disruption, economic pressures force Kay's estranged, divorced parents to cohabitate, creating a claustrophobic home environment. Kay attempts to find purpose and affection through fleeting relationships, including an affair with an American soldier stationed nearby. However, she faces growing social ostracisation from the local villagers, who mock her increasingly gaunt appearance and compare her to the witch from Snow White. As Kay's physical and mental health visibly deteriorates, her extreme weight loss and frailty are eventually revealed to be caused by tuberculosis. Her parents are slow to acknowledge the severity of her illness. Kay is ultimately sent away to a remote sanatorium, resulting in her permanent separation from the village and the narrator, her only true confidant.

== Characters ==
- The Narrator: An unnamed, introspective teenage boy who acts as the story's first-person witness. Growing into adulthood over the course of the war, he becomes a faithful confidant and ally to Kay.
- Kay Demarest: A bohemian, non-conforming woman in her mid-thirties who is deeply unhappy and isolated within her community. Resisting the rigid social expectations of her class, she becomes the target of severe emotional cruelty from her family.
- Charlie and Sybil Demarest: Kay's wealthy, cold, and profoundly snobbish parents. Estranged and divorced, economic pressures during the war force them back into cohabitation, where they continuously target Kay with cold hostility.
- Sandy Demarest: Kay's handsome brother, an aspiring actor who serves as a glamorous Group Captain in the Royal Air Force. He is the beneficiary of his mother's intense, favoritist devotion before being taken prisoner by the Germans.
- Denis Bellamy: An overtly queer, flagrantly eccentric Oxford acquaintance of the narrator who runs in the same social circles.
- Havoc: A homeless, stray dog adopted by Kay, whose ultimate loss contributes deeply to her spiraling emotional and mental decline.

== Publication history ==
The Other Garden was originally copyrighted in late 1987 to ensure eligibility for that year's literary awards circuit, permitting it to win the 1987 Whitbread First Novel Award. The initial uncorrected proof copies circulated in 1987 featured a plain paper wrapper. The primary commercial hardcover edition was officially released in the United Kingdom the following spring by Jonathan Cape. Subsequent mass-market paperback editions followed in the late 1980s, before the work was revived in the 21st century alongside Wyndham's shorter fiction.

- ISBN 978-0224024754. 1988. United Kingdom. Jonathan Cape. Hardback. First edition. Features cover art by Jane Human.
- ISBN 978-0099611608. 1989. United Kingdom. Arrow Books. Paperback.
- ISBN 978-0330457200. 2008. United Kingdom. Picador. Paperback. Released as The Other Garden and Collected Stories. Featuring an introduction by novelist Alan Hollinghurst.

== Reception ==
The Other Garden was met with widespread critical acclaim upon its publication. It won the 1987 Whitbread First Novel Award and was subsequently shortlisted for the overall Whitbread Book of the Year.

Following its 2008 reissue by Picador, the novella underwent a critical re-evaluation. Reviewing the collected edition for The Guardian, critics praised Wyndham's "subtle mastery of prose," comparing his sharp social comedy and observation of sleepy English towns to the works of Jane Austen.

== 2009 radio adaptation ==
The Other Garden and Collected Stories was adapted for radio by BBC Radio 4 in January 2009. Broadcast as part of the station's Afternoon Reading strand, selected stories and abridged segments from the book were performed across a three-part series by prominent British actors, including Bill Nighy and Emily Woof.
