= Edna Lewis Thomas =

American actress (1885–1974)

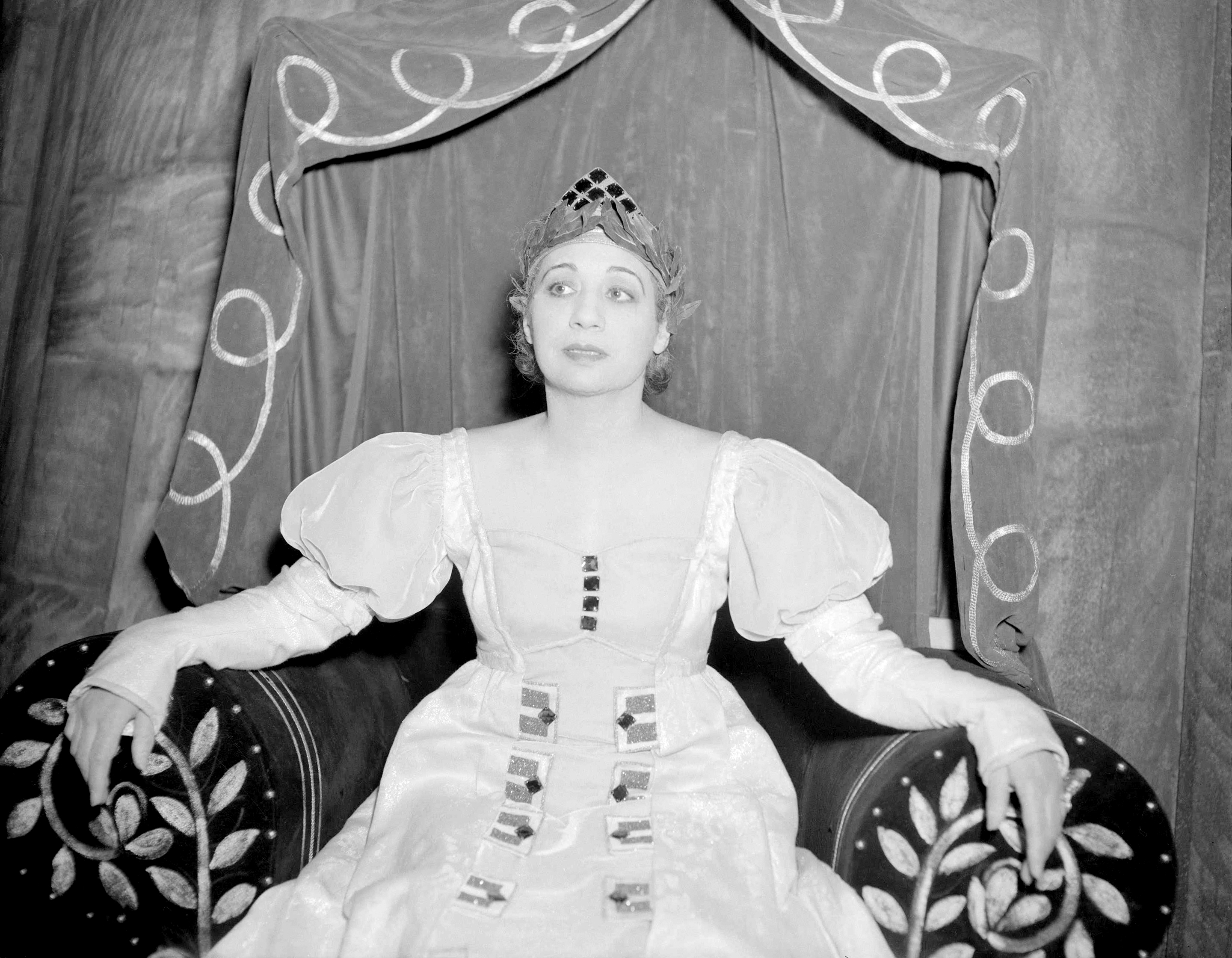
- Thomas as Lady Macbeth, 1936
- Born: Edna Lewis; November 1, 1885; Lawrenceville, Virginia, U.S.
- Died: July 22, 1974 (aged 88); New York City, U.S.
- Occupation: Actress
- Years active: 1920–1956
- Era: Harlem Renaissance
- Employer: Federal Theater Project
- Known for: Portraying Lady Macbeth in "Voodoo" Macbeth
- Spouse: Lloyd Thomas (m. c. 1914)
- Partner: Olivia Wyndham (1930–after 1942)

Edna Lewis Thomas (November 1, 1885 – July 22, 1974) was an American stage actress whose career began in New York City during the Harlem Renaissance. She appeared on Broadway, with the Lafayette Players theater company, and in productions by the Federal Theater Project of the Works Progress Administration. Her portrayal of Lady Macbeth in Orson Welles' all-Black "Voodoo" Macbeth in 1936 was much acclaimed. She was an influential figure in Black theater, and was a member of the Alhambra Players and the Harlem Experimental Theatre. She only appeared on screen once, in the 1951 film A Streetcar Named Desire.

Thomas was born in Virginia and raised in Boston. After moving to New York around 1916, she worked as a social secretary for the beauty entrepreneur Madam C. J. Walker. Though she was married to Lloyd Thomas, she started a long-term romantic relationship with British socialite Olivia Wyndham around 1930 and the three lived together for many years in a Harlem co-op.

== Early life ==
Edna Lewis was born on November 1, 1885, in Lawrenceville, Virginia. Author Saidiya Hartman, in Wayward Lives, Beautiful Experiments, wrote that Lewis's father was a white man who raped her Black mother in his household when she was a 12-year-old nursemaid. Edna grew up in Boston where she attended public schools.

She married around 1914 and moved with her husband to New York City, possibly in 1916. She worked as a social secretary for the Black beauty entrepreneur Madam C.J. Walker and through her was introduced to a variety of people in Harlem and Greenwich Village. In New York she became an influential figure in Black theater during the Harlem Renaissance.

== Stage career ==
Thomas was a prolific actress in all-Black vaudeville productions and theaters. She acted and sang in numerous productions at the Lafayette Theatre in Harlem, making her stage debut with the Lafayette Players in the 1920 play Turn to the Right. She was then cast in the plays Confidence (1920), The Heartbreaker (1921), and Comedy of Errors (1923). She had her Broadway debut in 1925 and had a role in the 1927 play Porgy.

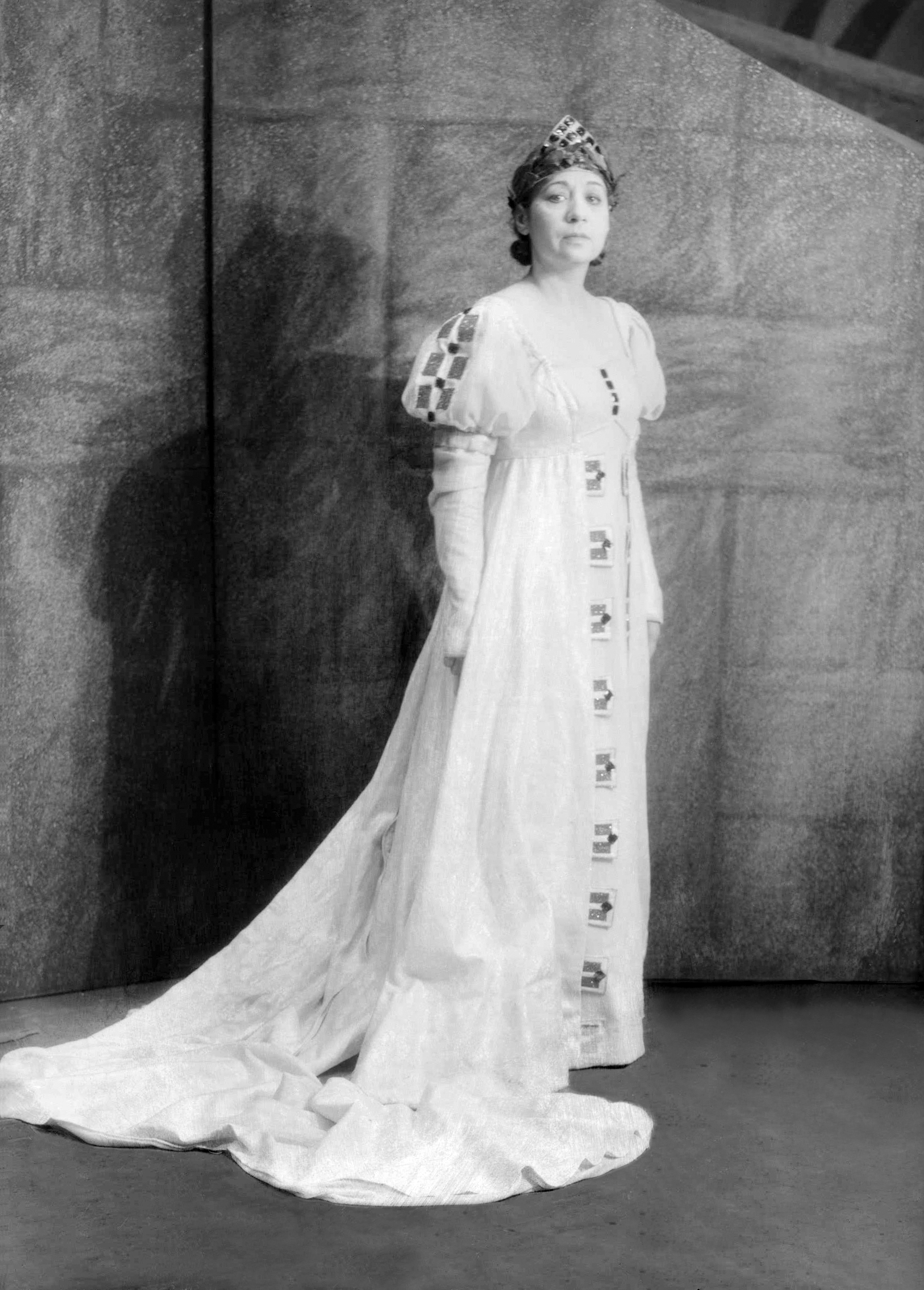
Thomas as Lady Macbeth, April 1936

Thomas joined the Alhambra Players in 1928, performing at The Harlem Alhambra and was in a 1929 revival of Porgy staged at the Martin Beck Theater. She joined the Harlem Experimental Theatre in 1930, acting in the premier public performance at the New York Public Library's 135th Street Branch. She remained active in theater in the 1930s, having roles in the musical Lulu Belle at the Belasco Theater and in the musical Shuffle Along. She also had lead roles in the all-Black 1933 folk opera Run, Little Chillun at the Lyric Theatre and Paul Peters' 1934 production Stevedore.

In 1936, Thomas was cast in the role of Lady Macbeth in an all-Black production of Macbeth at Lafayette Theater. The so-called "Voodoo" Macbeth was directed by Orson Welles and was a production of the Federal Theater Project of the Works Progress Administration. Rose McClendon was originally cast for her part, but Thomas took the role after McClendon became critically ill. Thomas's performance garnered positive reviews, with one reviewer calling her portrayal "sensitive and magnificent" and the Harlem press naming her the "First Lady of Negro Theatre".

Thomas appeared alongside Dooley Wilson in the 1938 Federal Theater Project production of Androcles and the Lion, where she had the role of Lavinia. She played Sukey in Harriet, Elia Kazan's 1943 Broadway play about Harriet Beecher Stowe. In 1944 she was cast in José Ferrer's production Strange Fruit, which was adapted from the novel of the same name by Lillian Smith.

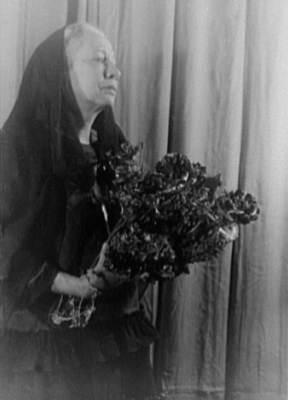
Thomas in A Streetcar Named Desire, 1948

Thomas portrayed a Mexican woman in the Broadway production of A Streetcar Named Desire in 1946. She reprised the role on stage in 1950 and again in the 1951 film A Streetcar Named Desire. It was her only film credit. Following another reprisal of the play A Streetcar Named Desire in 1956, Thomas retired from acting. She spent the rest of her life in New York.

== Personal life ==
Edna married talent manager Lloyd Carter Thomas around 1914. He later managed Madam C. J. Walker's Harlem salon and was a co-owner of Club Ebony. Thomas supported her husband financially during the Great Depression. The couple frequented parties at the Dark Tower, a cultural salon at the home of A'Lelia Walker.

Around 1930, Thomas began a romantic relationship with the British photographer and socialite Olivia Wyndham. They lived together, along with Thomas's husband, at a large Harlem co-op until at least 1942. In 1937, she and Wyndham participated pseudonymously in a Payne Whitney Psychiatric Clinic study of "100 socially well-adjusted men and women whose preferred form of libidinous gratification is homosexual". Thomas was also friends with the Harlem Renaissance photographer and patron Carl Van Vechten, corresponding with him regularly.

Thomas died on July 22, 1974, of heart disease at St. Vincent's Hospital in New York City. She was 88. The New York Public Library holds photographs of Thomas in its Edna Thomas Collection.

== Theater productions ==
Year	Title	Role	Notes
1920	Turn to the Right		
1920	Confidence		
1921	The Heartbreaker		
1923	Comedy of Errors		
1925	The Dreamy Kid / The Emperor Jones	Irene / Spectator	
1926–1927	Lulu Belle	Valma Custer	
1927	Porgy	Clara	Thomas also appeared in a 1929 production of Porgy.
1932	Ol' Man Satan	Maggie	
1933	Run, Little Chillun	Ella	
1934	Stevedore	Ruby Oxley	Thomas was in productions from April to July and from October to November of that year.
1936	Macbeth	Lady Macbeth	This production had an all-Black cast and was nicknamed Voodoo Macbeth.
1938–1939	Androcles and the Lion	Lavinia	
1944	Harriet	Sukey	Following the original run in March and April, Thomas reprised her role in a second run from September to October.
1945–1946	Strange Fruit	Mamie McIntosh	
1947–1949	A Streetcar Named Desire	Mexican Woman	Thomas reprised the role in revivals in 1950 and 1956.

== See also ==
- African-American musical theater
