= Ada Leverson =

British writer (1862–1933)

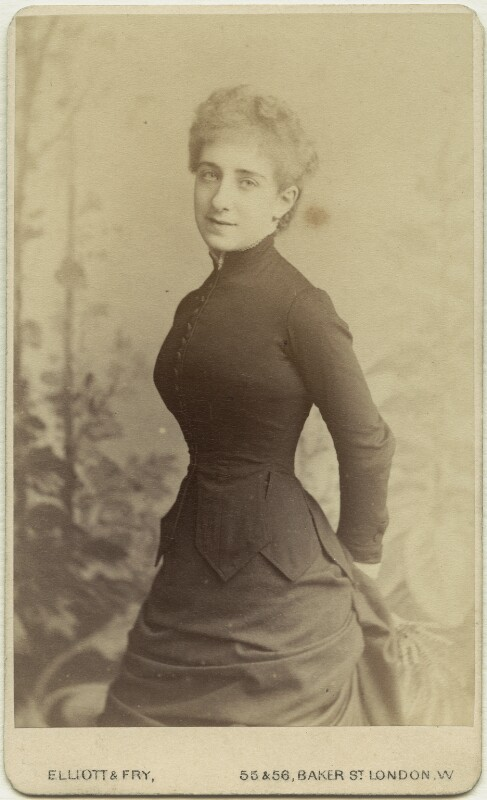
- Born: Ada Esther Beddington; 10 October 1862; London, England
- Died: 30 August 1933 (aged 70)
- Occupations: Novelist; short story writer
- Relatives: Guy Percy Wyndham (son-in-law); Francis Wyndham (grandson)

Ada Esther Leverson (née Beddington; 10 October 1862 – 30 August 1933) was a British writer who is known for her friendship with Oscar Wilde and for her work as a witty novelist of the fin-de-siècle.

== Family ==
Leverson was born into a Jewish family. Her father was Samuel Henry Beddington, a wool merchant, and her mother's name was Zillah.

She had eight younger siblings, one of whom died in infancy. Her living siblings were named Evelyn, George, Charles, Sybil, Frank, Arthur and Violet. Sybil (who later married David Seligman) had a brief affair and long friendship with Giacomo Puccini. Violet (1874–1962) turned down a marriage proposal from composer Arthur Sullivan and later married author Sydney Schiff.

At 19 Ada married Ernest Leverson (1852–1921) without her parents' consent. The marriage broke up when he moved to Canada in 1905. It has been suggested that her trilogy, The Little Ottleys, is loosely based on her own marriage. Her daughter and biographer, Violet Leverson, married Guy Percy Wyndham in 1923 as his second wife. Her grandson was short story-writer and novelist Francis Wyndham. Ernest Leverson's cousins include actor Darrell Fancourt and, by marriage, actor-playwright Brandon Thomas.

== Career ==
Leverson began writing during the 1890s, as a contributor to Black & White, Punch, The Yellow Book, St. Stephen's Review, Saturday Review, and Referee. She also worked as a drama critic, though when and what she wrote is unknown. Much of her work cannot be identified because she wrote anonymously, because she frequently befriended the people she parodied and critiqued.

She was known as a wit; her writing has been compared to the work of Max Beerbohm and the stories of Saki.

She was a loyal friend to Oscar Wilde, who called her Sphinx,and also to Max Beerbohm, and the Irish writer George Moore. Osbert Sitwell wrote an anecdote in Great Morning in which she tries, unsuccessfully, to get Moore to see the young William Walton. Sacheverell Sitwell dedicated a poetry collection to her.

After publishing Love at Second Sight, Leverson stopped writing fiction. She worked on ever smaller projects, such as writing the preface to Whom You Should Marry, a book about astrology.

=== Friendship with Wilde ===
Leverson's friendship with Wilde helped her career to flourish. There was no separation between their personal relationship and their creative collaboration. Their work had many stylistic differences; for example, Leverson had a stronger interest in human nature. But the two shared many similarities; they were from the same cultural background, and they shared interests such as the love of conversation and the sense of fantasy. They quickly became fast friends.

The limits of their friendship were tested in 1895 when Wilde's homosexuality was exposed and he went on trial. Leverson and her husband invited Wilde to stay in their nursery, because no hotel or inn would accept him as a guest. Wilde's and Leverson's other friendships were seriously challenged by Leverson's "grand gesture", which, according to James Scanell, is "the dramatic act of welcoming back an outcast."

Two years later, after Wilde was released from HM Prison Pentonville in the early morning of 19 May 1897, Leverson and her husband were part of a small group of friends that met him at the house of Stewart Headlam. Wilde remarked, "Sphinx, how marvellous of you to know exactly the right hat to wear at seven o'clock in the morning to meet a friend who has been away!" Later that day he left for France; the next day he wrote to her:

20 May 1897, Hotel Sandwich, Dieppe.

Dear Sphinx,

I was so charmed with seeing you yesterday morning that I must write a line to tell you how sweet and good it was of you to be of the very first to greet me. When I think that Sphinxes are minions of the moon and that you got up early before dawn, I am filled with wonder and joy.

I often thought of you in the long black days and nights of my prison-life, and to find you just as wonderful and dear as ever was no surprise. The beautiful are always beautiful.

Although Ada Leverson visited Wilde once more in Paris in 1898, their friendship continued largely through telegrams and letters until his death in 1900. Charles Burkhart believes that it is most fitting for Leverson's last work, Letters to the Sphinx from Oscar Wilde, with Reminiscences of the Author, to be a remembrance of the friend who expanded her career.

== Reception ==
Leverson's work, though not extremely popular, has been critiqued and analyzed from the 19th century to the present.

Critics disagree on which of her novels is the best, some suggesting The Limit, others Tenterhooks, and others Love at Second Sight. She is often praised for her skilful dialogue and characterization, leading many to believe that she would have excelled in theatre. It is interesting that she never acted upon this beyond a single unfinished play; it is assumed that this is because, for Leverson, writing was a hobby rather than a means of financial security.

One critic in The Bookman commented on how her lack of characterization distracted the reader from understanding what The Twelfth Hour was about. Dennis Poupard says, "some have found Leverson's characters merely vehicles for her wit, others believe she conveys accomplished characterization deftly and swiftly in the epigrammatic dialogue". John Mason Brown recommended that Leverson's work be read by "those who find laughter no hardship, high comedy a delight, nonsense relaxing, and who are not made uncomfortable by worldlings both comfortable and conscienceless". Margaret Crosland summarized several critics' feelings toward Leverson and reports that she is seen "as a distant descendant of Jane Austen, sensitive to the hidden motives of behavior, ready to laugh at vanity, understanding of married couples, parents, and children, yet seemingly preoccupied with all that was going on in the world outside".

== Portrayals in film ==
In the 1960 film The Trials of Oscar Wilde she is played by Maxine Audley.

In the 1997 film Wilde she is played by Zoë Wanamaker.

== Selected works ==
=== Novels ===
- The Twelfth Hour (Grant Richards, 1907)
- Love's Shadow (Grant Richards, 1908)
- The Limit (Grant Richards, 1911)
- Tenterhooks (Grant Richards, 1912)
- Bird of Paradise (Grant Richards, 1914)
- Love at Second Sight (Grant Richards, 1916)
- The Little Ottleys (Virago, 1982) omnibus:
  - Love's Shadow
  - Tenterhooks
  - Love at Second Sight

=== Short stories and parodies ===
- "An Afternoon Party," Punch, or the London Charivari, Volume 105, 15 July 1893, p. 13; a parody of Oscar Wilde's The Picture of Dorian Gray (published April 1891) and A Woman of No Importance (premiered 19 April 1893).
- "The Minx.—A Poem in Prose," Punch, or the London Charivari, Volume 107, 21 July 1894, p. 33; a parody of Oscar Wilde's The Sphinx (published 11 June 1894).
- "Overheard Fragment of A Dialogue," Punch, or the London Charivari, Volume 108, 12 January 1895, p. 24; a parody of Oscar Wilde's An Ideal Husband (premiered 3 January 1895).
- "The Advisability of Not Being Brought up in a Handbag: A Trivial Tragedy for Wonderful People (Fragment found between the St. James's and Haymarket Theatres)," Punch, or the London Charivari, Volume 108, 2 March 1895, p. 107; a parody of Oscar Wilde's The Importance of Being Earnest, A Trivial Comedy for Serious People (premiered 14 February 1895).
- "Suggestion," The Yellow Book, vol. 5, April 1895.
- "Claude’s Aunt"
- "Mimosa"
- "In the Change of Years"

=== Memoir ===
- Letters to the Sphinx From Oscar Wilde, with Reminiscences of the Author (Duckworth, 1930)

=== Adaptation ===
- Sixes and Sevens (2004)
