= Francis Wyndham (writer) =

English journalist, novelist, editor, and literary scout (1924–2017)

Francis Wyndham FRSL
- Wyndham in 2008
- Born: Francis Guy Percy Wyndham; 2 July 1924; St George Hanover Square, London, England (Note: Wyndham's birth was registered in the St George Hanover Square registration district. While the corresponding civil parish had been abolished in 1922, the area retained its historic name for civil birth, marriage, and death registration purposes until the district was merged into the City of Westminster in 1933.)
- Died: 28 December 2017 (aged 93); Westminster, Greater London, England
- Resting place: New Southgate Cemetery
- Citizenship: United Kingdom of Great Britain and Ireland (until 1927) (Note: Wyndham's citizenship formally transitioned from the United Kingdom of Great Britain and Ireland to the modern United Kingdom following the passage of the Royal and Parliamentary Titles Act 1927 on 12 April 1927, which formally updated the monarch's title and the official name of the state following the establishment of the Irish Free State.); United Kingdom (from 1927)
- Education: Eton College; University of Oxford
- Occupations: Journalist, novelist, editor, literary scout
- Years active: 1945–2008
- Era: Post-war
- Employer: The Sunday Times Magazine (1964–1980)
- Known for: Coaxing manuscripts from Jean Rhys and Bruce Chatwin
- Parents: Guy Wyndham (father); Violet Wyndham (mother)
- Relatives: Richard Wyndham (paternal half-brother); Olivia Wyndham (paternal half-sister)
- Family: Wyndham (paternal)
- Honours: Fellow of the Royal Society of Literature (1995)
- Military career
- Allegiance: United Kingdom
- Branch: British Army
- Service years: 1942–1943
- Service number: 6107884
- Unit: Queen's Royal Regiment (West Surrey)
- Conflicts: Second World War
- Writing career
- Language: English
- Period: 1972–1991
- Genres: Documentary; Biography; Fiction; Short stories; Autobiography; Novella; Journalism
- Notable work: The Other Garden (1988)
- Notable awards: Whitbread First Novel Award (1987)

Francis Guy Percy Wyndham FRSL (2 July 1924 – 28 December 2017) was an English journalist, novelist, editor, and literary scout. For nearly two decades, he served as a senior editor for The Sunday Times Magazine, where he became a prominent cultural figure by pioneering an "image-first" layout philosophy and introducing popular culture into mainstream broadsheet journalism.

Though his own literary output was sparse, spanning only five published volumes, his pervasive, behind-the-scenes influence shaped 20th-century English literature. He was widely celebrated for discovering V. S. Naipaul, managing the historic literary rediscovery of Jean Rhys, and launching the literary career of Bruce Chatwin. His 1988 novella, The Other Garden, won the prestigious Whitbread First Novel Award when he was 63 years old. In 1999, he was elected a Fellow of the Royal Society of Literature (FRSL).

== Early life ==
A birth member of the Wyndham family, Francis Guy Percy Wyndham was born on 2 July 1924 in St George Hanover Square, London, England. His father, Colonel Guy Percy Wyndham, was a retired military officer and diplomat who had notably fought at the Relief of Ladysmith during the Second Boer War. His father's first wife had died during the post-First World War influenza epidemic, leaving three half-siblings, one of whom, Second Lieutenant George Heremon Wyndham, was killed in action during the First World War. His half-siblings were the painter Richard Wyndham and the photographer Olivia Wyndham. When Wyndham was sixteen years old, his father died. While Wyndham associated his father with a stifling sense of social propriety, he received early literary encouragement from his mother, Violet Lutetia Henrietta (née Leverson), a biographer who was considerably younger than his father.

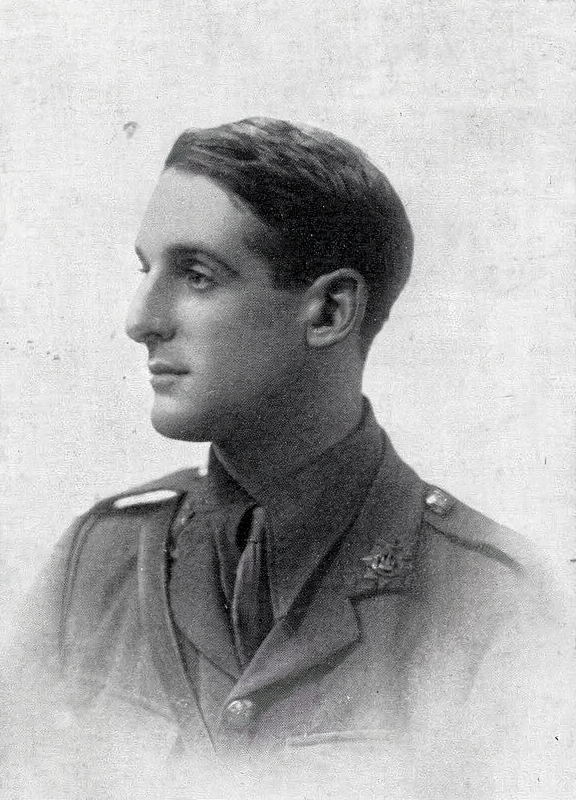
Second Lieutenant George Heremon Wyndham (1893–1915).

Through his mother, Wyndham was the grandson of the Jewish Edwardian novelist Ada Leverson, a prominent member of Max Beerbohm's circle and a loyal friend to Oscar Wilde, who famously dubbed her The Sphinx. Wyndham's maternal granduncle was the novelist and translator Sydney Schiff, who hosted a Parisian dinner party in 1922 where James Joyce and Marcel Proust met for the only time in their lives. Schiff also translated Time Regained, the final volume of Proust's À la recherche du temps perdu. From this history, Wyndham became a lifelong francophile.

When Wyndham was four years old, his family relocated to Parliament Piece, a large house in the village of Ramsbury near Marlborough, Wiltshire. He grew up in deep rural isolation, and he later recalled that he would still dream of the River Kennet and the local walks, noting that it permanently remained his internal landscape. His childhood memories were entirely happy, with the sole exception of attending school. He began reading at an early age and was educated at Eton College, an institution he intensely disliked. He largely detached himself from the school's activities and barely took part in its curriculum. His housemaster, George Lyttelton, who was a friend of his father, permitted him a wide degree of latitude and advised him to take up bicycling. Wyndham used this freedom to bicycle to Maidenhead to watch films at the cinema, an experience that directly led to his self-professed expertise in Hollywood glamour films. At Eton, he also discovered the works of Proust, an encounter that changed his life by revealing the expansive possibilities of literary art and experimentation.

Wyndham left Eton as early as possible and went briefly to the University of Oxford during the Second World War. He was subsequently called up for national service in the British Army, but was quickly invalided out and discharged after being diagnosed with tuberculosis (TB). His wartime convalescence was spent at a sanatorium in East Anglia and at his family home in Wiltshire. He later described this period of his life as an atmosphere of remedially arrested development and an unnatural stasis sweetly prolonged, typified by late rising, morning walks, lunches at the British Restaurant in The Church Room, afternoon lies-down, and strolls to the post office.

== Career ==
Following the conclusion of the war, Wyndham began writing book reviews for The Times Literary Supplement, where the prominent novelist Anthony Powell was serving as fiction editor. He briefly joined the publisher Derek Verschoyle before securing a position as a publisher's reader and literary adviser for André Deutsch, working there from 1955 until 1959. At André Deutsch, alongside editor Diana Athill, Wyndham became a pervasive, behind-the-scenes force in 20th-century English literature, renowned for discovering, encouraging, and coaxing manuscripts from an array of emerging writers.

Athill initially requested that Wyndham read a manuscript by V. S. Naipaul. Recognising the author's immense talent, Wyndham persuaded Deutsch to publish Naipaul's first two novels, initiating a lifelong personal friendship. During this same period, Athill drew his attention to Jean Rhys, a modernist writer who had completely vanished from the literary scene following the publication of Good Morning, Midnight in 1939. In 1950, Wyndham had mistakenly referred to her in an article as "the late Jean Rhys" after hearing a false rumour that she had died in a sanatorium. In 1957, he discovered her actual whereabouts, living in frail poverty in Devon. Wyndham, alongside his close friend Sonia Orwell, began making regular visits to Rhys. Over the next several years, Rhys became deeply dependent on Wyndham's editorial judgment and emotional support as she struggled to resolve severe narrative problems with her work. The eventual publication of her historical masterpiece, Wide Sargasso Sea (1966), owed its existence entirely to Wyndham's persistent guidance, reassurance, and structural advice. He also played a critical role during this era in recasting and reviving the post-war literary reputation of Ivy Compton-Burnett.

In 1960, Wyndham was invited by art director and fellow chess enthusiast Mark Boxer to join Queen magazine, initially serving as its theatre critic. In 1964, he followed Boxer to The Sunday Times Magazine, where he would remain for nearly two decades, working variously as showbusiness editor and senior editor. At the magazine, Wyndham became the presiding genius who successfully ushered popular culture into the mainstream of modern British broadsheet journalism. Working in close tandem with graphic designer David King and art editor Michael Rand, Wyndham championed a revolutionary "image-first" design philosophy, believing against publishing orthodoxy that the visual image must dictate the layout.

Wyndham possessed an unerring instinct for identifying emerging talent, famously selecting a trio of young working-class photographers—David Bailey, Terence Donovan, and Brian Duffy—as the pacesetters of the 1960s Swinging London style. He regularly matched avant-garde photographers, including Don McCullin, Eve Arnold, and Antony Armstrong-Jones, 1st Earl of Snowdon, with literary writers who had often never written journalism before. In 1972, Wyndham successfully cleared the magazine's layout to grant McCullin an unprecedented, seventeen-page, entirely advertisement-free spread to showcase his stark photojournalism of the Vietnam War. That same year, Wyndham recruited Bruce Chatwin to the magazine as an arts consultant, setting Chatwin's literary career on its definitive course. Chatwin had recently quit Sotheby's and was struggling to write a book on nomads; Wyndham goaded him into journalism, commissioning him to interview forgotten cultural subjects such as the bias-cut inventor Madeleine Vionnet and designer Eileen Gray. In 1974, over a drink with Wyndham at the Chelsea Hotel in New York City, Chatwin announced he was departing for South America, sending a famous telegram that simply read: "Gone to Patagonia." The result was Chatwin's landmark debut book, In Patagonia (1977). Chatwin frequently declared that it was Wyndham who taught him how to prune and pad his prose, advising him to focus on how a person speaks rather than just what they said. Wyndham similarly nurtured the investigative journalism of James Fox.

As an interviewer and writer, Wyndham's own prose was fluent, invincibly ironic, observant, and richly allusive. His friend Alan Hollinghurst described him as "a writer who never wastes a word or puts one wrong." Wyndham famously pioneered a casual, languid interviewing technique; he never used a tape recorder, and rarely took any notes, writing down only two or three key words. He relied instead on a formidable memory to reconstruct dialogue with the precision of a Rolex watch, capturing his subjects through their distinct conversational idiosyncrasies. His pieces sought to achieve the clear-cut shape and intensity of a good short story. His profile subjects ranged from Hollywood screen icons like Marlene Dietrich, Judy Garland, and Alice Faye, to French New Wave figures such as Jeanne Moreau and Stéphane Audran. He commissioned Man Ray to photograph Catherine Deneuve, wrote profiles of literary figures like Colette, and penned definitive essays on writers such as John Updike. He also treated pop culture figures with serious intellectual critique—akin to George Orwell's analysis of boys' comics—including groundbreaking profiles of Tiny Tim and P. J. Proby. His 1965 profile of Proby became legendary for revealing that the singer had split his trousers on stage during an exuberant leap. He was particularly adept at profiling "has-beens", such as the ex-troupers Anne Ziegler and Webster Booth, whom he tracked down to a bungalow on the Welsh coast. He also wrote a brilliant, scathing dissection of the popular television presenter Eamonn Andrews.

However, Wyndham's cultural judgment was occasionally fallible; he famously dismissed a scruffy young music group called The Rolling Stones, choosing instead to put his money on The Pretty Things, whom he confidently predicted would be bigger than The Beatles. Conversely, Wyndham was just as vital to the magazine for his rejection of mediocrity as he was for picking talent. His devastatingly polite, piece-killing putdown—"I'm not very drawn to that" or "I don't really warm to it"—routinely consigned self-important ideas to the wastebasket. He was famous for cutting the pompous down to size, once asking the Catholic politician Norman St John-Stevas, "I can't remember, are you pro-abortion or against?" Of Lord Snowdon, the magazine's star photographer, Wyndham dryly remarked, "Fascinating to be with, though he never reads a book." When the magazine's editor, Godfrey Smith, asked him for his thoughts on a pitch during an editorial conference, Wyndham languidly replied, "I don't know. I was asleep."

Wyndham's career was also marked by an enduring attraction to the edgier sides of society, the counterculture, and the political left. He briefly befriended the notorious East End gangsters, the Kray twins, after they initially approached him to write their biography. Wyndham opted to interview them instead, becoming deeply fascinated by their mother, Violet Kray. He once brought Reggie Kray to a casual magazine party alongside a distinctly nervous couple who had failed to pay the brothers protection money. When the twins broke Frank "The Mad Axeman" Mitchell out of Dartmoor Prison in 1966, sparking a massive manhunt, Ronnie Kray telephoned Wyndham directly, stating: "We've got Mitchell. He wants to give himself up. To you." Though a major scoop was engineered with The Sunday Times, the Krays instead murdered Mitchell before the surrender could take place. Following their convictions in 1969, Wyndham became an official prison visitor for the brothers, regularly travelling to Parkhurst Prison on expeditions with Mrs Kray. Furthermore, introduced by journalist Alex Mitchell, Wyndham briefly flirted with the hard left by attending meetings of the Workers Revolutionary Party alongside Vanessa Redgrave and Corin Redgrave. He later admitted he was drawn far more to the human drama of the meetings than the actual politics.

Wyndham was famously caricatured as the brilliant, elite, large-headed, and droop-mouthed journalist Evelyn Strachey in Philip Norman's media novel Everyone's Gone to the Moon (ISBN 9780099423911). By 1980, a profound sense of apathy and disgust regarding the changing office landscape overtook Wyndham. He found himself physically unable to enter the office and was, by his own admission, gratefully fired from The Sunday Times that year.

== Personal life ==
Wyndham never married, nor had children. He lived by himself for four decades, residing latterly at 530a, a small flat located above a dry cleaners on the Harrow Road in the Notting Hill area of London. He did not mind living alone and never expressed guilt or regret regarding his comparatively slim creative output, once stating: "I don't think it is quite so nice having things published. All that inspection of one. I mean if people hate this book, then they hate me. Anyway, I don't have guilt about not doing things. I regret the things I did do." He also noted that the long periods of his life where nothing seemed to happen at all were intentionally channelled into his fiction, believing that life spent in a kind of limbo was not sufficiently celebrated in literature.

The Guardian noted in Wyndham's obituary that, "although he lived by himself for 40 years, [...] his old age was never lonely." His close friends included Julian Barnes, Alan Hollinghurst, Diana Athill, and Edna O'Brien. His distant relative, Max Egremont, noted that above all else, Wyndham possessed total integrity. Hollinghurst observed that Wyndham represented the last vital link to cultural worlds that had abruptly become remote, being the only person alive who could effortlessly reminisce about Ada Leverson, Henry Green, and the Kray twins, simultaneously. He was also a close friend of the artist Lucian Freud, who painted his portrait, perfectly capturing Wyndham's characteristically world-weary facial expression.

Wyndham was the sitter for two portraits held in the permanent photographs collection of the National Portrait Gallery, London. His first formal portrait for the gallery was taken in May 1985 by portrait and editorial photographer Chris Garnham, who captured Wyndham seated on a staircase. The resulting 13 7/8 in. x 14 in. bromide fibre print was posthumously donated to the museum by Garnham's estate in 1991, coinciding with the gallery's commemorative exhibition Chris Garnham: Photographer 1958–1989. A second photographic portrait, captured by photographer Richard Saker on 10 August 2008, featured Wyndham seated in an armchair inside his North London home. The chromogenic print was taken during an interview session tracking Wyndham's six decade literary career and his relationships with other prominent cultural figures. The portrait was officially incorporated into the National Portrait Gallery's collection as a direct gift from Saker in 2010.

Wyndham died from kidney failure on 28 December 2017 in Westminster, Greater London, England. He was 93. At the time of his death, his close friends James Fox, Edward St Aubyn, and Jean Longman were present at his bedside. He was predeceased by his younger brother, Hugh Guy Osbert "Hughie" Wyndham, and three older half-siblings. He was survived by his niece, Rachel. Wyndham was honoured with extensive obituaries across the British broadsheet press, including The Telegraph, The Times, and The Guardian, all of which celebrated his pervasive influence on 20th-century English literature and his transformative, "image-first" leadership at The Sunday Times Magazine. Following a private funeral service, he was cremated at New Southgate Cemetery on 16 January 2018.

== Filmography ==
Year	Title	Role	Notes	Ref.
1964–1970	Take It or Leave It	Himself	8 episodes	
1979	The Book Programme	Himself	Episode: "V.S. Naipaul"	
1979	Tigers Are Better-Looking	Himself	Short film	
1999	In the Footsteps of Bruce Chatwin	Himself	Television documentary	
2004	Lucien Freud: Portraits	Himself	Television documentary	
2010	Small Gestures in Bare Rooms	Himself	Short film	

== Bibliography ==
Wyndham's published bibliography was deliberately sparse, running to only five volumes across his lifetime:

- Wyndham, Francis (1972). Trotsky: A Documentary. Allen Lane. ISBN 978-0713903348. A documentary and pictorial biography of Leon Trotsky, compiled and illustrated utilising the private posters and photographic archives of his friend, David King.
- Wyndham, Francis (1974). Out of the War. Gerald Duckworth and Company. ISBN 978-0715608661. Wyndham's debut fictional work, consisting of a collection of short stories written during his teenage years while waiting to be called up for military service. The directly autobiographical manuscript had lain untouched at the back of a drawer for three decades after being serially rejected by publishers, until editor Karl Miller discovered it while Wyndham was moving house. The stories perfectly captured the grimy atmospherics, station buffets, local cinemas, and immobilised stasis of wartime provincial towns.
- Wyndham, Francis (1985). Mrs Henderson and Other Stories. Jonathan Cape. ISBN 978-0224023061. A highly acclaimed collection of short stories praised universally by critics for its innate elegance, concision, and startling emotional accuracy.
- Wyndham, Francis (1988). The Other Garden. Jonathan Cape. ISBN 978-0224024754. Wyndham's only novel, a slim, highly autobiographical novella set in Wiltshire during the Second World War. The book charts a young narrator's friendship with an intriguing, rebellious, but pathetic older woman named Kay Demarest (based on a real-world childhood friend of Wyndham's) who refuses to conform or compete, and who ultimately dies of tuberculosis (TB). Following her death, the narrator romantically swears a loyal oath to eschew worldly ambition and avoid the wielders of influence and power—a vow Wyndham noted he was not always able to keep.
- Wyndham, Francis (1991). The Theatre of Embarrassment. Chatto & Windus. ISBN 978-0701137267. A compiled anthology of his finest journalistic profiles, essays, and celebrity interviews, titled after his scathing review of television presenter Eamonn Andrews. The collection was hailed by critic Hilary Spurling as invincibly ironic, richly allusive, and discreetly louche.

In 2008, Picador published The Other Garden and Collected Stories, a 416-page omnibus that compiled Wyndham's complete fictional output. The single-volume collection featured an introduction by novelist Alan Hollinghurst and brought his 1988 title novella back into print alongside his two previously published short story collections, Out of the War (1974) and Mrs Henderson and Other Stories (1985).

== Awards and honours ==
At the age of sixty-three, Wyndham won the 1987 Whitbread First Novel Award (now known as the Costa Book Awards) for his historical novella, The Other Garden (1988). The prize panel praised the book's concision, elegance, and emotional accuracy, validating a literary talent that had quietly developed alongside his decades of behind-the-scenes editorial work.

In recognition of his distinguished career as a journalist, novelist, editor, and literary scout who profoundly shaped 20th-century English literature, Wyndham was elected a Fellow of the Royal Society of Literature (FRSL) in 1999.
