= Sally McLaren =

British painter, printmaker and etcher (born 1936)

Sally McLaren RE
- Born: Frances Sally McLaren; 21 September 1936 (age 90); London, England
- Education: Ruskin School of Art, Oxford; Central School of Art and Design, London; Atelier 17, Paris
- Known for: Painter, printmaker and etcher
- Elected: Fellow of the Royal Society of Painter-Printmakers; Fellow of the Printmakers Council of Great Britain

Frances Sally McLaren is a British painter, printmaker and etcher who was born in London in 1936. She lives and works in East Knoyle, Wiltshire.

== Art education ==
McLaren studied at the Ruskin School of Art in Oxford from 1956 to 1959 where she won two prizes for painting.

She then completed her postgraduate training at the Central School of Art and Design in London from 1959 to 1961 under the tuition of Merlyn Evans and Tony Harrison where she gained a thorough grounding in etching techniques.

McLaren won a French Government scholarship to study at Atelier 17 in Paris from 1961 to 1962 with Stanley William Hayter. She found Hayter's personality electrifying and this had a lasting influence on her work.

== Career ==
McLaren was elected to associate membership (ARE) of the Royal Society of Painter-Etchers and Engravers (now the Royal Society of Painter-Printmakers) in 1961 while she was still a student and subsequently became a Fellow of the Royal Society of Painter-Printmakers in 1973, which entitles McLaren to use the post-nominal letters RE after her name. McLaren was also an original member of the Printmakers Council of Great Britain, becoming a Fellow in 1971.

Teaching: McLaren taught etching at Goldsmiths College of Art in London from 1962 to 1965.

== Work ==
In 1971 the Arts Review critic commented that her earlier work was influenced by Hayter, and although she had absorbed his techniques she subsequently 'turned it to her own ends'.

Largely abstract, McLaren's work has been described as a 'vision of a rural idyll rooted in the bold sweeps' of the countryside, which rarely dissolves into total abstraction, but treads a path between abstract and a realistic view of nature.

Her work takes inspiration from the land, seascape and the elements, with her priority being to 'simplify'. She is influenced by the feeling of 'walking inside a painting', something she experiences when looking at Mark Rothko's work. Her colour palette echoes the landscape: Cinnabar Green and Raw Umber reflects the Wiltshire countryside with Ultramarine and Cobalt blue representing flax fields. McLaren's etching observes the marks made on the land and on rock faces, with studio based drawings of graphite-stick and pencil often made from her subconscious.

Her work, in oils or watercolor, uses surface colors. Her experience in printmaking involves using texture to build shapes and color in her work.

== Exhibitions ==
=== Solo exhibitions ===
- 1964 Bear Lane Gallery, Oxford
- 1982 Hambledon Gallery, Blandford, Dorset
- 2016 Bankside Gallery, London
- 2017 At The Chapel, Bruton, Somerset

=== Group exhibitions ===
- 1962 Royal Academy Summer Exhibition, London
- 1962 & 1964 Women's International Art Club, FBA Galleries, London
- 1964-1966 North-West Printmakers, Seattle, USA
- 1964 Atelier 17 Group Show, Paris
- 1966 Ljubljana Print Biennale, Slovenia
- 1966 Edinburgh International Festival, Scotland
- 1967 Associated American Artists Gallery, New York, USA
- 1971 Sydney Rothman Gallery, New Jersey, USA
- 1978 Royal Academy Summer Exhibition, London
- 1982 Cork Street Fine Arts, London
- 1983 La Jeune Gravure Contemporaine, Paris
- 1983 Royal Academy Summer Exhibition, London
- 2003 Royal Academy Summer Exhibition, London
- 2017 Museum of Contemporary Art, Yinchuan, China
- 2017 Royal West of England Academy, Bristol
- 2018 Messums Gallery and Arts Centre, Wiltshire
- 2022 Sladers Yard Gallery, Dorset, 22 January - 5 March 2022
- 2024 Sladers Yard Gallery Summer Print Show, Dorset, 20 July - 15 September 2024

== Galleries and museums ==
McLaren's work is in the Scarborough Art Gallery and Salisbury Library & Galleries.

Her work is also held in the following collections, galleries and museums:

- The New York Public Library
- The Scottish Arts Council
- The Ashmolean Museum, Oxford
- The Government Art Collection
- Greenwich Library
- The Greater London Council
- Glasgow University Collection
