= George Wyndham =

British politician (1863–1913)

The Right Honourable George Wyndham
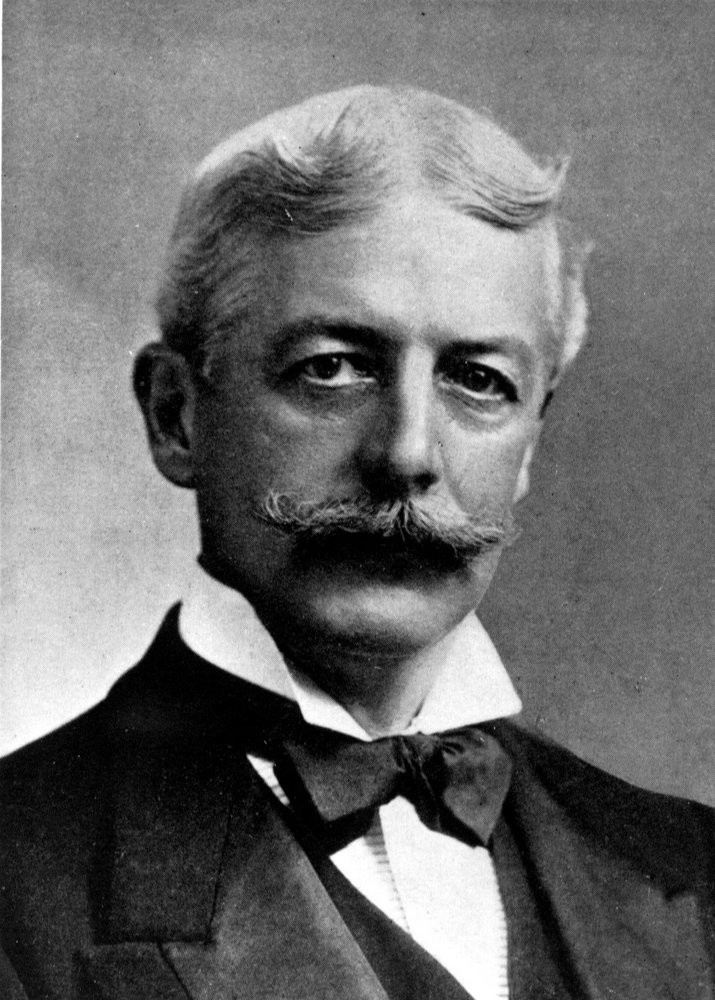
- George Wyndham in the early 1900s.

Under-Secretary of State for War
- In office 10 October 1898 – 13 November 1900
- Monarch: Victoria
- Prime Minister: The Marquess of Salisbury
- Preceded by: St John Brodrick
- Succeeded by: The Lord Raglan

Chief Secretary for Ireland
- In office 9 November 1900 – 12 March 1905
- Monarchs: Victoria; Edward VII
- Prime Minister: The Marquess of Salisbury; Arthur Balfour
- Preceded by: Gerald Balfour
- Succeeded by: Walter Long

Personal details
- Born: 29 August 1863
- Died: 8 June 1913 (aged 49)
- Party: Conservative
- Spouse(s): Lady Sibell Lumley (1855–1929)

George Wyndham, PC (29 August 1863 – 8 June 1913) was a British Conservative politician, statesman, man of letters, and one of The Souls.

== Background and education ==
Wyndham was the elder son of the Honourable Percy Wyndham, third son of George Wyndham, 1st Baron Leconfield, and he was a direct descendant of Sir John Wyndham. He was the brother of Guy Wyndham and Mary Constance Wyndham. His mother was Madeleine Campbell, sixth daughter of Major-General Sir Guy Campbell, 1st Baronet, and Pamela, through whom he was the great-grandson of the Irish Republican leader Lord Edward FitzGerald, whom Wyndham greatly resembled physically. He was educated at Eton College and the Royal Military College, Sandhurst. He joined the Coldstream Guards in March 1883, serving through the Suakin Expedition of 1885.

== Political career ==
Wyndham started his political career in 1887, when he became private secretary to Arthur Balfour. In 1889, he was elected unopposed to the House of Commons as Member of Parliament (MP) for Dover, and held the seat until his death.

Wyndham launched an Imperialist magazine called The Outlook in February 1898. This may have been supported financially by Cecil Rhodes, with whom he had a close relationship. Joseph Conrad, who was a contributor, described the publication:

There is a new weekly coming. Its name The Outlook; its price three pence sterling, its attitude – literary; its policy – Imperialism, tempered by expediency; its mission – to make money for a Jew; its editor Percy Hurd (never heard of him) ...

Also in 1898, Wyndham was appointed Under-Secretary of State for War under Lord Salisbury, which he remained until 1900. He was closely involved in Irish affairs at two points. Having been private secretary to Arthur Balfour during the years around 1890 when Balfour was Chief Secretary for Ireland, Wyndham was himself made Chief Secretary by Salisbury in 1900. He continued in this position after Balfour succeeded as prime minister in July 1902, but was taken into the Cabinet, and sworn a member of the Privy Council on 11 August 1902.

Wyndham furthered the 1902 Land Conference and also successfully saw the significant Land Purchase (Ireland) Act 1903 into law. This change in the law ushered in the most radical change in history in Ireland's land ownership. Before it, Ireland's land was largely owned by landlords; within years of the Acts, most of the land was owned by their former tenants, who had been supported in their purchases by government subsidies (also known as Imperial credit).

He was thought to be associated with the devolution scheme to deal with the Home Rule question, co-ordinated with the Irish Reform Association and conceived by his permanent under-secretary Sir Antony MacDonnell (afterwards Baron) with the approval of the Lord Lieutenant William Ward, 2nd Earl of Dudley. He resigned, largely as a result of his perceived association with the failure of the devolution scheme, in March 1905. Balfour's Unionist government fell in December 1905.

Wyndham was in October 1902 elected by the students of the University of Glasgow to be Lord Rector of the university for three years. He was elected a Member of the Worshipful Company of Musicians in January 1903.

Wyndham was the leader of the "die-hard" opponents in the House of Commons of the Parliament Bill that became the Parliament Act 1911.

== Family ==
Wyndham married in 1887 Sibell Mary, Countess Grosvenor, daughter of Richard Lumley, 9th Earl of Scarbrough, and widow (since 1884) of Victor Grosvenor, Earl Grosvenor, son of Hugh Grosvenor, 1st Duke of Westminster. She was Wyndham's senior by eight years, and her son succeeded as 2nd Duke of Westminster in 1899. Towards the end of his life the couple settled at Clouds House in Wiltshire, designed for his father Percy Wyndham by the Arts and Crafts movement architect, Philip Webb (1886). In 1911 he succeeded his father and had the management of a small landed estate on his hands.

Wyndham died suddenly in June 1913 in Paris, aged 49, of a blood clot. He was survived by his wife and one son.

Lady Grosvenor died in February 1929, aged 73.

There has been speculation over the years that Wyndham was the natural father of Anthony Eden, who was prime minister from 1955 to 1957. Eden's mother, Sybil, Lady Eden, was evidently close to Wyndham, to whom Eden bore a striking resemblance.

== Works ==
- North's Plutarch (1894; editor)
- The Poems of Shakespeare (1898; editor)
- The Ballad of Mr. Rook (1901)
- Ronsard & La Pleiade, with Selections From Their Poetry and Some Translations in the Original Metres (1906)
- Sir Walter Scott (1908)
- The Springs of Romance in the Literature of Europe (1910; address, University of Edinburgh, October 1910)
- Essays in Romantic Literature (1919; edited by Charles Whibley)

Parliament of the United Kingdom
Preceded by Alexander Dickson	Member of Parliament for Dover; 1889–1913	Succeeded by Viscount Duncannon
Political offices
Preceded by St John Brodrick	Under-Secretary of State for War; 1898–1900	Succeeded by The Lord Raglan
Preceded by Gerald Balfour	Chief Secretary for Ireland; 1900–1905	Succeeded by Walter Long
Academic offices
Preceded by The Earl of Rosebery	Rector of the University of Glasgow; 1902–1905	Succeeded by H. H. Asquith
Preceded by Richard Haldane	Rector of the University of Edinburgh; 1908–1911	Succeeded by The Earl of Minto
