= East Knoyle =

English village in Wiltshire

Coordinates: 51.074°N 2.171°W

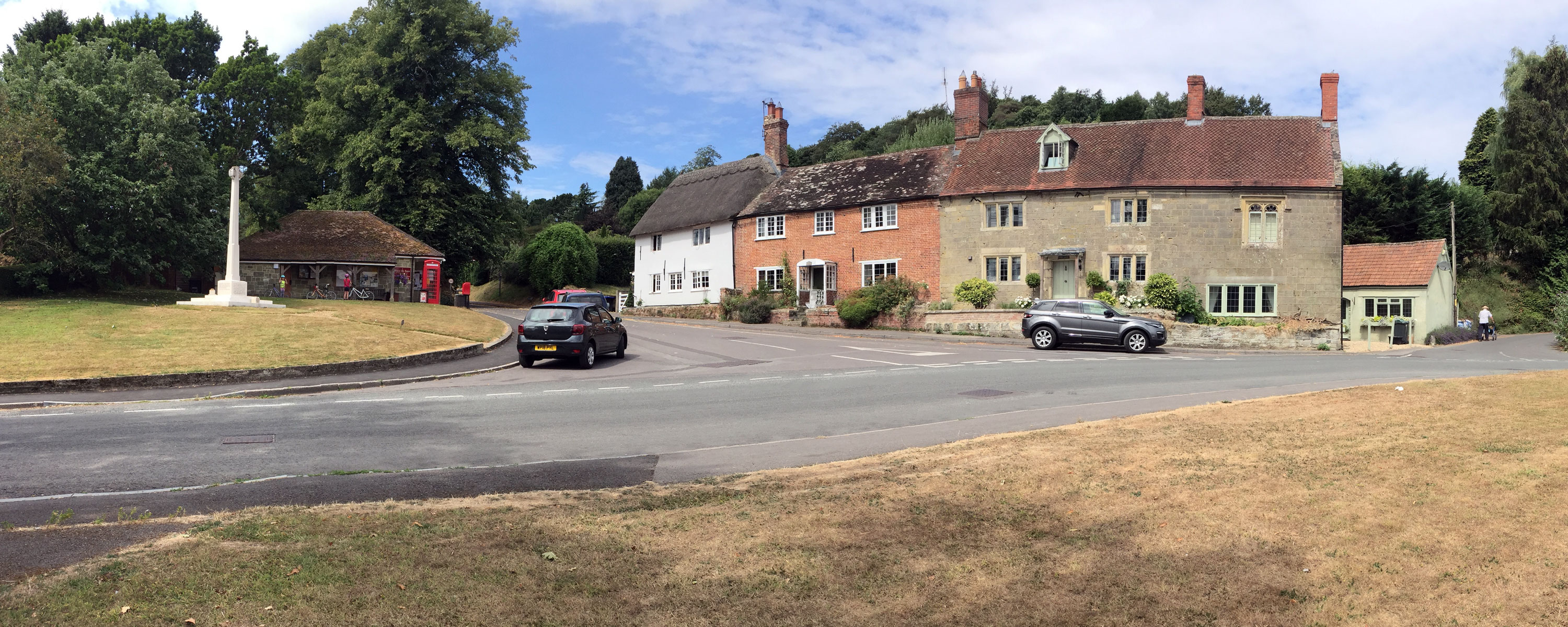
- Village centre, with the war memorial and the shop

- Location within Wiltshire
- Population: 681 (in 2011)
- OS grid reference: ST881305
- Civil parish: East Knoyle
- Unitary authority: Wiltshire
- Ceremonial county: Wiltshire
- Region: South West
- Country: England
- Sovereign state: United Kingdom
- Post town: Salisbury
- Postcode district: SP3
- Dialling code: 01747
- Police: Wiltshire
- Fire: Dorset and Wiltshire
- Ambulance: South Western
- UK Parliament: Salisbury
- Website: www.east-knoyle.co.uk

East Knoyle is a village and civil parish in Wiltshire, in the south-west of England, just west of the A350 and about 9 miles (14 km) south of Warminster and 5 miles (8 km) north of Shaftesbury, Dorset. It was the birthplace of the architect Sir Christopher Wren. The parish includes the hamlets of Holloway, Milton, The Green, Underhill and Upton.

== History ==
East Knoyle was part of the ancient Hundred of Downton.

Unusually for England, parish registers survive from 1538 and are kept in the Wiltshire and Swindon History Centre.

John Marius Wilson's Imperial Gazetteer of England and Wales (1870–1872) notes two tythings in East Knoyle: Milton and Upton.

East Knoyle's population has risen and fallen in recent centuries, with a period of growth in the 19th century. In 1801 the population was 853, and by 1831 it had reached 1028, but in 1901 it was down again to 814. In 1951, the population was still at 821, but by 1971 it was only 699.

The market town of Hindon was established in the north-east of East Knoyle parish in the early 13th century and became a separate civil parish in the later 19th century. In 1885 the southern part of the former parish of Pertwood was added to East Knoyle. Most of this addition was transferred to Chicklade parish in 1986.

Primitive Methodists built a chapel, later called Ebenezer chapel, at The Green in 1843; this closed sometime before 1977. Charles Jupe, a silk manufacturer of Mere, built a Congregational chapel and schoolroom in the village in 1854, replacing an earlier chapel. By 1987 the church had fallen into disuse.

The school next to the Congregational church became a British School, but closed in 1881. A National School was built in 1872–1873 on land near the church provided by Alfred Seymour. The design by George Aitchison Jnr has windows in Moorish style. The remaining village school merged with the school at Hindon in 1984.

The Warminster–Shaftesbury road ran through East Knoyle village. In the 20th century this became part of the primary A350 route between the M4 motorway and the south coast, and took a straighter course to the east of the village.

== Notable buildings ==
=== Parish church ===
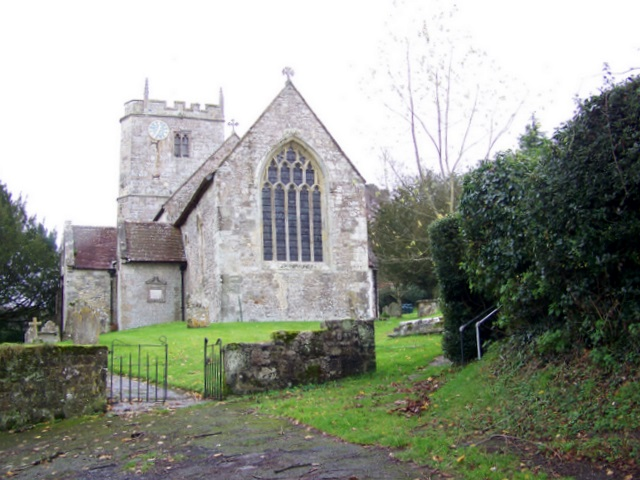
St Mary's Church

The Church of England Parish Church of St Mary was begun before the 1066 conquest. Pevsner described its chancel as "Norman in its bones" and wrote that its 17th-century plaster decoration, a "surprise and delight", "ought to be the purpose of a visit from every Wiltshire tourist".

The church was extended in the 13th, 14th and 15th centuries, with a large tower added in the 15th. Plaster work in the chancel depicting biblical scenes was designed in about 1639 by Dean Christopher Wren (rector from 1620, and father of the prolific architect Sir Christopher Wren). Five of the six bells are from the 18th century. The building was further extended in the 19th century, along with restoration in 1845 by Wyatt and Brandon, and interior alterations in 1875-6 by Sir Arthur Blomfield.

The church was declared Grade I listed in 1966. Since 2008, the ecclesiastical parish forms part of the benefice of St Bartholomew, a group of six parishes.

St Mary's had a chapelry at Hindon from the 13th century. Hindon became a separate vicarage in 1869.

=== Knoyle Place ===
Knoyle Place served as the rectory until the 1940s. A 14th-century range, rebuilt in the 17th, stands next to a larger five-bay 18th-century range faced with ashlar.

=== Clouds House ===
Clouds House, a Grade II* listed country house north-west of East Knoyle village, was built in 1886–1891 for Percy Wyndham, to designs of Philip Webb. It is one of Webb's grandest designs. It is now occupied by the Action on Addiction charity as a treatment centre for drug and alcohol dependence.

=== War memorial ===
The memorial was dedicated in 1920 to those from the village who died in the First World War, and has subsequently been used to commemorate those who died in the Second World War and the Iraq War.

== Governance ==
East Knoyle elects a consultative parish council under Wiltshire Council, which has its offices in Trowbridge. The parish is part of the Nadder Valley electoral division, which elects one member of Wiltshire Council. It is represented in Parliament by the member for the Salisbury constituency, John Glen.

== Amenities ==
East Knoyle has a village hall, between the church and the former school. The hall was created in 1908 by the Seymour family, using a 14th-century hall house for one part of it.

The village has a community-owned shop and post office. There is a pub at The Green, the Fox and Hounds.

== Notable people ==
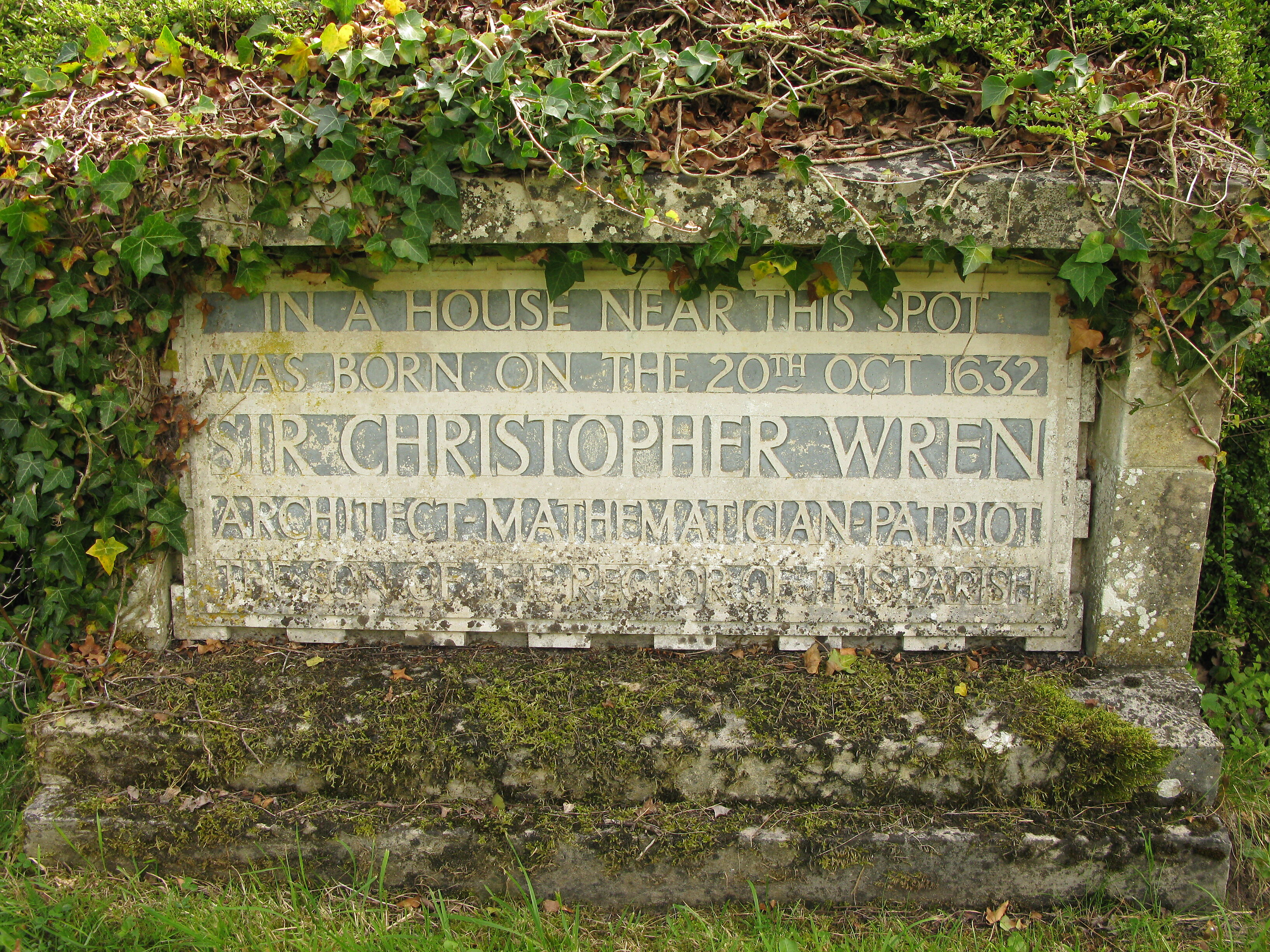
Plaque commemorating Christopher Wren in centre of village

- Sir Christopher Wren, architect, was born at East Knoyle on 20 October 1632.
- A branch of the Seymour family held land at East Knoyle, including three Members of Parliament: Henry (died 1807), Henry (died 1849) and Alfred (died 1888). Their 17th-century Knoyle House was demolished in 1954.
- Lady Cynthia Asquith (1887–1960) was born Mary Evelyn Charteris at Clouds, near the village.
- Sally McLaren (born 1936), painter, printmaker and etcher, lives and works in the village.
- The author and notable diarist Joan Wyndham (1921–2007) was born in the village.
