= Richard Wyndham (painter) =

British artist, author and soldier (1896–1948)

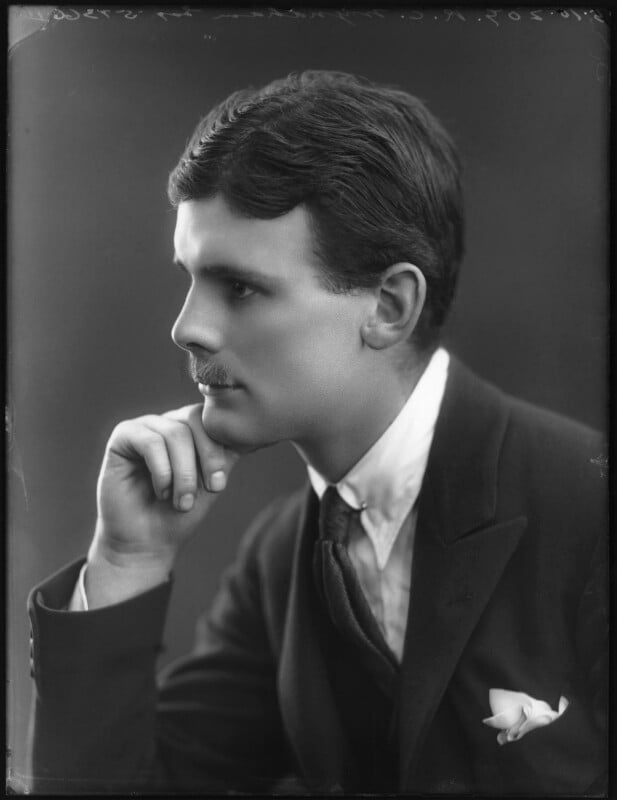
- Richard Wyndham in 1920
- Born: 29 August 1896; Canterbury, England
- Died: May 19, 1948 (aged 51); Palestine
- Education: Wellington College, Berkshire; Royal Military Academy Sandhurst
- Spouse: Iris Winifred Youell Bennett (m. 1920; div. 1925) Grethe Wulfsberg (m. 1930)

Guy Richard Charles Wyndham (29 August 1896 – 19 May 1948) was a British painter, engraver, author and soldier. He made many work trips to southern Europe and died in Palestine while covering the 1948 Arab–Israeli War as a correspondent for The Sunday Times. He was a member of the Bright Young People, a group of Bohemian young aristocrats and socialites in London during the Roaring Twenties.

== Biography ==
Born into an aristocratic family in Canterbury (his father was Guy Wyndham), he was educated at Wellington College, Berkshire and the Royal Military Academy Sandhurst.

He served as a lieutenant in the King's Royal Rifle Corps, an infantry rifle regiment of the British Army, and, during the First World War, was transferred at the Second Battle of Ypres, being awarded the Military Cross.

Wyndham later began studying art; he was a pupil of the painter and novelist Wyndham Lewis. Much later, in the 1930 novel The Apes of God, Richard Wyndham is portrayed satirically by Lewis as the character Richard Whittingdon. In response Wyndham offered two of Lewis's paintings for sale in The Times personal column, describing them by size rather than description.

In 1914, still only 18, he unexpectedly inherited Clouds House at East Knoyle in Wiltshire. From 1924 he let the house out, and sold the entire estate in 1936. In 1927 he purchased Tickerage Mill, a residence on the outskirts of Uckfield, Sussex, close to his friend, fellow painter Edward Wadsworth.

Wyndham drove fast cars, flew his own plane and partied with members of the Bright Young People, a group of young bohemians from British high society. His social circle included Tallulah Bankhead, Ann Charteris, Cyril Connolly, Tom Driberg, Ian Fleming, Constant Lambert, Peter Quennell, the Sitwells and A. J. A. Symons.

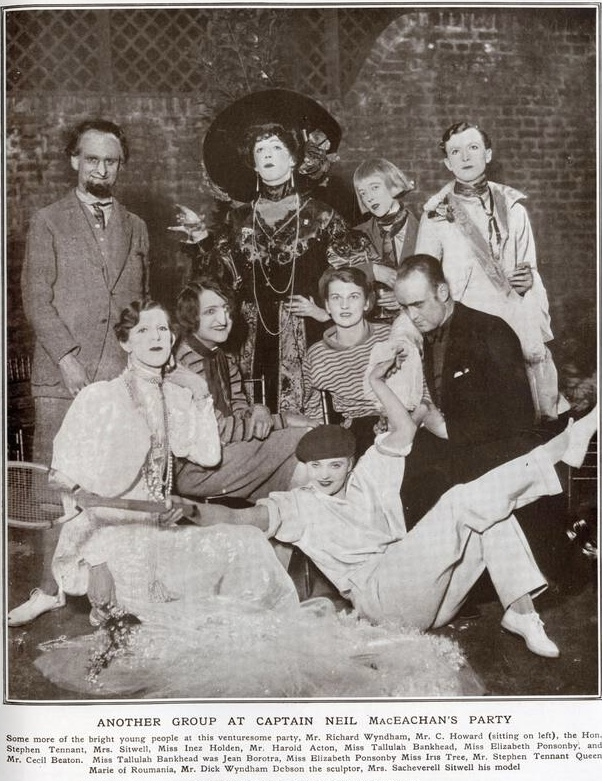
Bright Young People group at a costume party in 1927; Wyndham is listed in the photography's caption.

He entered his first marriage in 1920 with Iris Winifred Youell Bennett (divorced in 1925) and, for the second time, with Grethe Wulfsberg in 1930 (divorced in 1941).

Wyndham exhibited at Goupil and Leicester and Tooth Galleries, having a first solo exhibition at the latter in 1933, and had works purchased by Edward Marsh, Manchester City Art Gallery and galleries in Brighton, Hull, Rochdale and Belfast.

He died in 1948 in Palestine while covering the 1948 Arab–Israeli War as a correspondent for The Sunday Times.

== Author ==
The Gentle Savage: A Sudanese Journey in the Province of Bahr-El-Ghazal, Commonly Called The Bog was published in 1936. It chronicles Wyndham's travels in Southern Sudan up the Nile by river boat, including 48 photos by the author. An account of a pre-war journey he made around South East England was published in 1940, also including his own photographs.

His half brother was the writer and editor Francis Wyndham. His daughter (with Iris Bennett) was the writer and memorist Joan Wyndham.

== List of paintings ==
Image	Title	Date	Material	Collection
	Winter Landscape	c. 1925		
	A Dinka Herdsman	1927/1937		
	The Medway near Tonbridge	1936		
	The Pink Boat	1938		
	Tickerage Mill	c. 1939		
	Summer Landscape (1)	1947		
	Still Waters	before 1948		
	Storm over Greece	before 1948		
	Summer Landscape (2)	before 1948		
