= Action on Addiction =

Charity in the United Kingdom

- Founded: 2007
- Type: National organisation
- Purpose: Alcohol and substance abuse treatment and recovery, including family recovery
- Headquarters: Wiltshire, United Kingdom
- Region served: England and Wales, United Kingdom
- Key people: Catherine, Princess of Wales
- Website: www.actiononaddiction.org.uk
- Formerly called: The Chemical Dependency Centre, Clouds

Action on Addiction is a UK-based charity that works with people affected by drug and alcohol addiction. It works in the areas of research, prevention, treatment, aftercare, as well as professional education and family support. Catherine, Princess of Wales has been patron since January 2012. The charity merged with The Forward Trust in May 2021.

== History ==
The charity was formed in 2007 by the merger of three charities: the Chemical Dependency Centre (established in 1985), Clouds (established in 1987) and the original Action on Addiction (established in 1989). The new charity assumed the name Action on Addiction.

On 8 March 2021 it was announced that Action on Addiction would merge with The Forward Trust on 1 May 2021. The combined charity is known as The Forward Trust although the Action on Addiction brand name continues to be associated with certain elements of the service provision for the time being.

== Facilities ==
The charity's head office is in Wiltshire, with centres and programs operating in London, Wiltshire, Bournemouth, Essex and Liverpool. In Spring 2011, the charity introduced a family treatment program at a prison in Bridgend, South Wales.

Treatment centres include Clouds House and Hope House. Clouds House is a Grade II listed building near the village of East Knoyle. The charity also has a recovery dry bar in Liverpool, called The Brink.

== Treatment ==
Action on Addiction provides abstinence-based twelve-step programs in residential treatment, structured day treatment and relapse prevention programs at various venues around England for substance misusers as well as counseling and a brief residential program for families, partners and friends.

The M-PACT program (Moving Parents and Children Together, operated under the charity's ‘For Families’ division) focuses specifically on the impact of drug addiction on families. It is an eight-week programme designed to help children aged 8–17 whose parents have drug and/or alcohol addictions. The program is based on the belief that healing the whole family, not just individual members, leads to the longest lasting and most successful outcomes. It is provided at various venues around England and Wales.

== Research and education ==
The charity works with researchers at the National Addiction Centre, part of the Institute of Psychiatry at King's College London. The charity played a part in establishing the National Addiction Centre and funds a chair in Addiction Psychiatry.

The charity (through its Centre for Addiction Treatment Studies ‘CATS’) is part of the Faculty of Humanities and Social Sciences at the University of Bath which offers accredited Foundation and BSc (Hons) degrees, and continuing professional development in addictions counseling.

== Patron ==
In January 2012, Catherine, Duchess of Cambridge became patron of Action on Addiction, one of the first four charities she chose to support in this way. In October 2012, The Duchess also gave her backing to the charity's M-PACT program. The Duchess has visited the charity's facilities on several occasions.

On 14 February 2012 she visited The Brink, the charity's dry bar in Liverpool that offers a night out without the pressure to drink alcohol.

On 3 February 2013 she visited Clouds House treatment center in Wiltshire.

On 24 October 2013, the Duchess attended the 100 Women in Hedge Funds philanthropic initiatives reception dinner held at Kensington Palace in aid of the charity. She attended the event one day after christening of her son, Prince George. She is a patron of both Action on Addiction and 100WHF, an organisation for professionals in the alternative investments industry.

On 23 April 2013, in a speech at the launch of a new Manchester primary school counseling program, a joint project with the charity Place2Be, the Duchess said, "Through my Patronage of Action on Addiction, I feel fortunate to have met a wide range of inspirational people who have overcome addiction. It is so encouraging to see that with the right help... it can be conquered."

On 19 February 2013, she visited Hope House, the charity's residential treatment center for women recovering from addiction. It was her first official engagement following the announcement of her pregnancy.

On 1 July 2014, the Duchess visited Blessed Sacrament School in Islington, north London, to review the progress of M-PACT Plus, a joint project with the charity Place2Be, which addresses addiction in families. She was joined by comedian John Bishop.

On 23 October 2014, the Duchess attended the charity's Autumn Gala Evening dinner and reception in London, where she was joined by comedian and impressionist Rory Bremner. At the time, The Duchess was just over 12 weeks pregnant with her second child. It was "her third official engagement in three days since returning to the spotlight after her battle against an aggressive type of morning sickness".

== In literature ==
The charity is mentioned on page 317 of J.K. Rowling's first adult novel, The Casual Vacancy.

"... two drugs workers part-funded by the council, and partly by Action on Addiction, which is a really good charity. Then there's a social worker attached to the clinic, Nina, she's the one who gave me all this - oh, thanks very much,' said Kay, beaming up at Tessa, who had set down a mug of tea on the table beside her."

In 2016, the charity was mentioned on page 10 of Ben Starling's novel, Something in the Water.

"... Helen from CSR has been browbeating me about our employee-chosen charity scheme. Last year, of course, we supported Action on Addiction."

== In popular media ==
On 27 August 2014 Kirby Gregory, Director of Treatment and Care at the charity, and Claire Clarke, Referrals Consultant, took part in Channel 4's "Addicts' Symphony", counseling classical musicians in recovery who wrote an original classical piece within the London Symphony Orchestra Discovery Programme.

On 29 September 2013, Nick Barton, the charity's CEO, was interviewed by Phil Gayle on BBC Radio Oxford, and discussed getting people into recovery and keeping them there.

On 26 February 2012, the charity's treatment center, Clouds House, was featured in a BBC One documentary called Panorama: Britain's Hidden Alcoholics with Alasdair Campbell.

In 2009, the charity's M-PACT program was featured in a BBC True Vision documentary: Brought Up By Booze hosted by Calum Best (footballer George Best's son). Moving Parents and Children Together 'supports children/young people aged 8–17 who are experiencing the effects of parental substance misuse within the family...' and 'offers a Whole Family Approach'.

In May and June 2001, Clouds House was also featured in a four-part series created by BBC Two, Inside Clouds: A Drink & Drugs Clinic. This series traced the progress of several residents as they struggled through six weeks of a (six-month) program of rehabilitation.

Celebrity supporters of the charity (and of the founding charities) from television, music and fashion at various times have included: Bryan Adams, Eric Clapton, Sir David Frost, Joanna Lumley, Emilia Fox, Patsy Palmer, Roger Black, Edward Fox, Tania Bryer, Siân Lloyd, Trinny Woodall, Susannah Constantine, Laura Bailey, Tamara Beckwith, Sophie Anderton, Caprice Bourret, Lucy Ferry, and David Shilling.

Celebrity supporters from sport have included: British tennis players Annabel Croft and Andrew Castle; Romanian former World No. 1 professional tennis player Ilie Năstase; English footballer Dion Dublin; British rower Sir Matthew Pinsent; West Indian cricket player Alvin Kallicharan; and British sailor Tracy Edwards; as well as former track and field athlete, Chairman of the board of the bid company for the London 2012 Olympics and British politician, Sebastian Coe.

== Charity status ==
Action on Addiction is a registered charity (number 1117988) and a company registered in England and Wales limited by guarantee (number 05947481). Its registered address is: Head Office, East Knoyle, Salisbury, Wiltshire SP3 6BE.
