= Percy Wyndham (1835–1911) =

British politician (1835–1911)

The Honourable Percy Wyndham JP DL
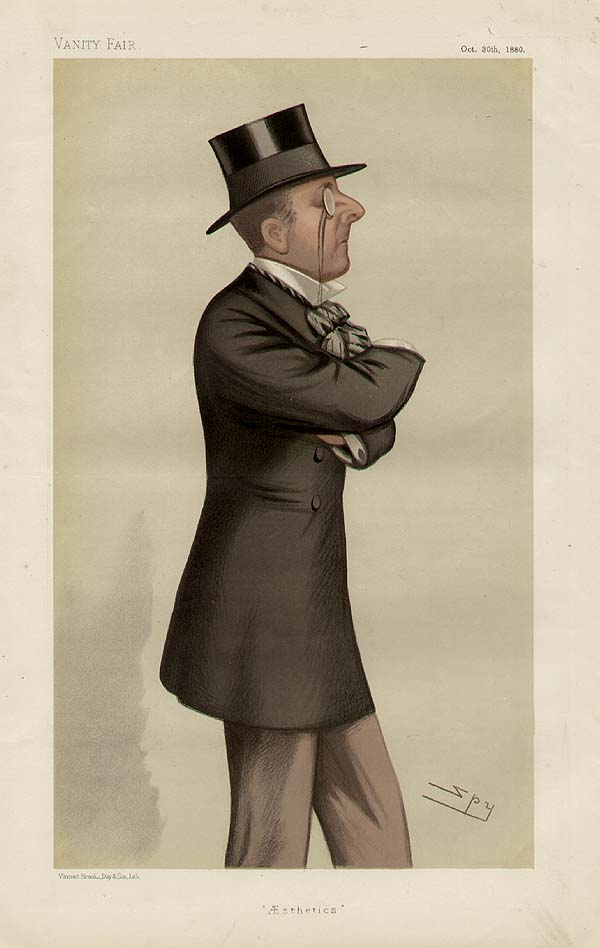
- "Æsthetics". Caricature by Spy published in Vanity Fair in 1880

Member of Parliament for Cumberland West
- In office 1860–1885
- Preceded by: Sir Henry Wyndham
- Succeeded by: Constituency abolished

High Sheriff of Wiltshire
- In office 1896–1897
- Preceded by: Charles Walker
- Succeeded by: Sir John Gladstone

Personal details
- Born: 30 January 1835
- Died: 13 March 1911 (aged 76) East Knoyle, Wiltshire, England
- Party: Conservative
- Spouse: Madeline Campbell (m. 1860)
- Children: Mary Charteris, Countess of Wemyss and March; George Wyndham; Guy Percy Wyndham; Madeline Adeane; Pamela Grey, Viscountess Grey of Fallodon
- Education: Eton College

Percy Scawen Wyndham, JP, DL (30 January 1835 – 13 March 1911) was a British Conservative politician, collector and intellectual. He was one of the original members of The Souls, and built Clouds House at East Knoyle, Wiltshire.

== Background and education ==
Wyndham was a younger son of George Wyndham, 1st Baron Leconfield, and his wife Mary Blunt, daughter of William Blunt, and was educated at Eton. He served in the Coldstream Guards and achieved the rank of captain.

== Political career ==
In 1860, Wyndham was returned to Parliament as one of two representatives for Cumberland West (succeeding his uncle Sir Henry Wyndham), a seat he held until 1885. He was also a Deputy Lieutenant and Justice of the Peace for Sussex. He owned the Wiltshire manor of Pertwood from 1877 until his death, and he became a member of Wiltshire County Council and was High Sheriff of Wiltshire for 1896.

== Family ==
The Wyndham Sisters: Lady Elcho, Mrs. Adeane, and Mrs. Tennant, by John Singer Sargent, 1899 (Metropolitan Museum of Art)

Wyndham married Madeline Caroline Frances Eden Campbell, daughter of Sir Guy Campbell, 1st Baronet, and his wife Pamela FitzGerald, daughter of Lord Edward FitzGerald. They were both prominent members of The Souls. They had two sons and three daughters who were also members of The Souls. George Wyndham was a politician and man of letters, while Guy Wyndham was a soldier.

Their eldest daughter Mary married the Hugo Charteris, 11th Earl of Wemyss, and their second daughter Madeline married Charles Adeane. Their third daughter Pamela married firstly Edward Tennant, 1st Baron Glenconner and was the mother of among others Stephen Tennant, and secondly Sir Edward Grey. Wyndham commissioned the now-famous painting of his daughters, The Wyndham Sisters: Lady Elcho, Mrs. Adeane, and Mrs. Tennant, by John Singer Sargent. The trio are the centre of the 2014 book Those Wild Wyndhams by Claudia Renton.

Percy Wyndham died in March 1911, aged 76. His wife survived him by nine years and died in March 1920.

== Spiritualism ==
Wyndham was a spiritualist who took interest in parapsychology. He was a friend of the medium Stainton Moses and a member of the London Spiritualist Alliance.

Wyndham was an early member of the Society for Psychical Research. In 1884, he attended a séance with the medium William Eglinton and was impressed by his slate-writing phenomena. However, Eglinton was exposed as a fraud by other researchers.

Parliament of the United Kingdom
Preceded by Henry Lowther; Sir Henry Wyndham	Member of Parliament for Cumberland West; 1860–1885; With: Henry Lowther 1860–1872; The Lord Muncaster 1872–1880; David Ainsworth 1880–1885	Constituency abolished
