= Clouds House =

Country house in Wiltshire, England

Coordinates: 51°4′44″N 2°10′38″W

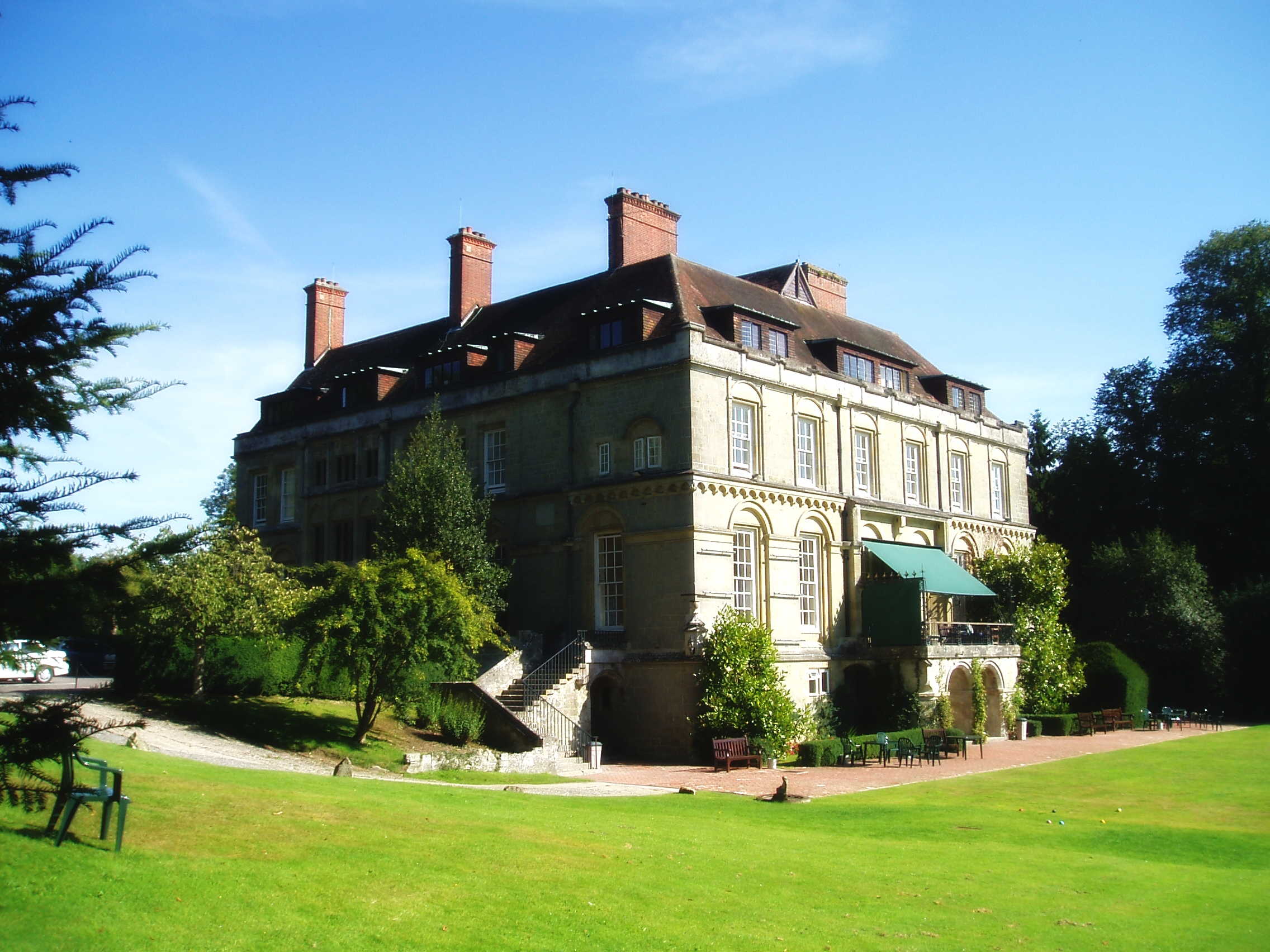
Clouds House from the south-west

Clouds House, also known simply as Clouds, is a Grade II* listed building at East Knoyle in Wiltshire, England. Designed by Arts and Crafts architect Philip Webb for Percy Wyndham and his wife Madeline, it was first completed in 1886, but an 1889 fire necessitated its rebuilding, finished in 1891. Clouds was Webb's grandest design. It became a centre of social activity for the intellectual group known as The Souls, and was frequented by artists such as Edward Burne-Jones and politicians like Arthur Balfour.

Since 1983 the house has been a treatment centre for drug dependence and alcohol dependence, under the name Clouds House. In 2007 the Clouds House treatment centre merged with two other organisations to form the charity Action on Addiction, which is headquartered at East Knoyle.

== Construction ==
Wyndham bought the 4,207 acres (1,703 ha) Clouds estate in 1876, for c. £100,000. It was so-called because its lands included the former manor of Clouds, in Milton, Wiltshire, which was owned by John Clouds at some time before 1551.

Wyndham commissioned Webb to replace a smaller house on the site, at the head of a valley sloping down to the south-east, with uncultivated land lying to the north. It was Webb's grandest country house design, intended to facilitate the Wyndhams' continual round of house parties, creating "a palace of week-ending for our politicians" in the words of Webb's friend William Lethaby. Two south-facing drawing rooms were connected by double doors, allowing them to be joined into one large space. The south elevation, which had three gables, also featured a large balcony with a canvas awning, built over a loggia. It overlooked a terrace for outside dancing.

The centre of the house was occupied by a two-storey living hall, divided into three bays by two arches supported on piers, with each bay lit by a roof lantern. It contained a freestanding inglenook with a large, hooded fireplace. A gallery around the top of the hall was glazed to prevent eavesdropping on conversations below.

An extensive service wing on lower ground to the east of the main house was attached to its north-east corner. The former service buildings remaining are Grade II listed, some having been demolished.

The Wyndhams moved into the house in September 1885, although some of the house's detailing was not finished until 1886.

== 1889 fire ==
A fire in January 1889, started by a lighted candle left at night in a linen cupboard, destroyed the house except for the external walls. The service wing also survived. A full insurance payout enabled Wyndham to rebuild the house exactly as before, except for the addition of fireproof floors and improved plumbing. After living in the service wing since the fire, the Wyndhams moved back into the rebuilt house in August 1891.

== Furnishings and art ==
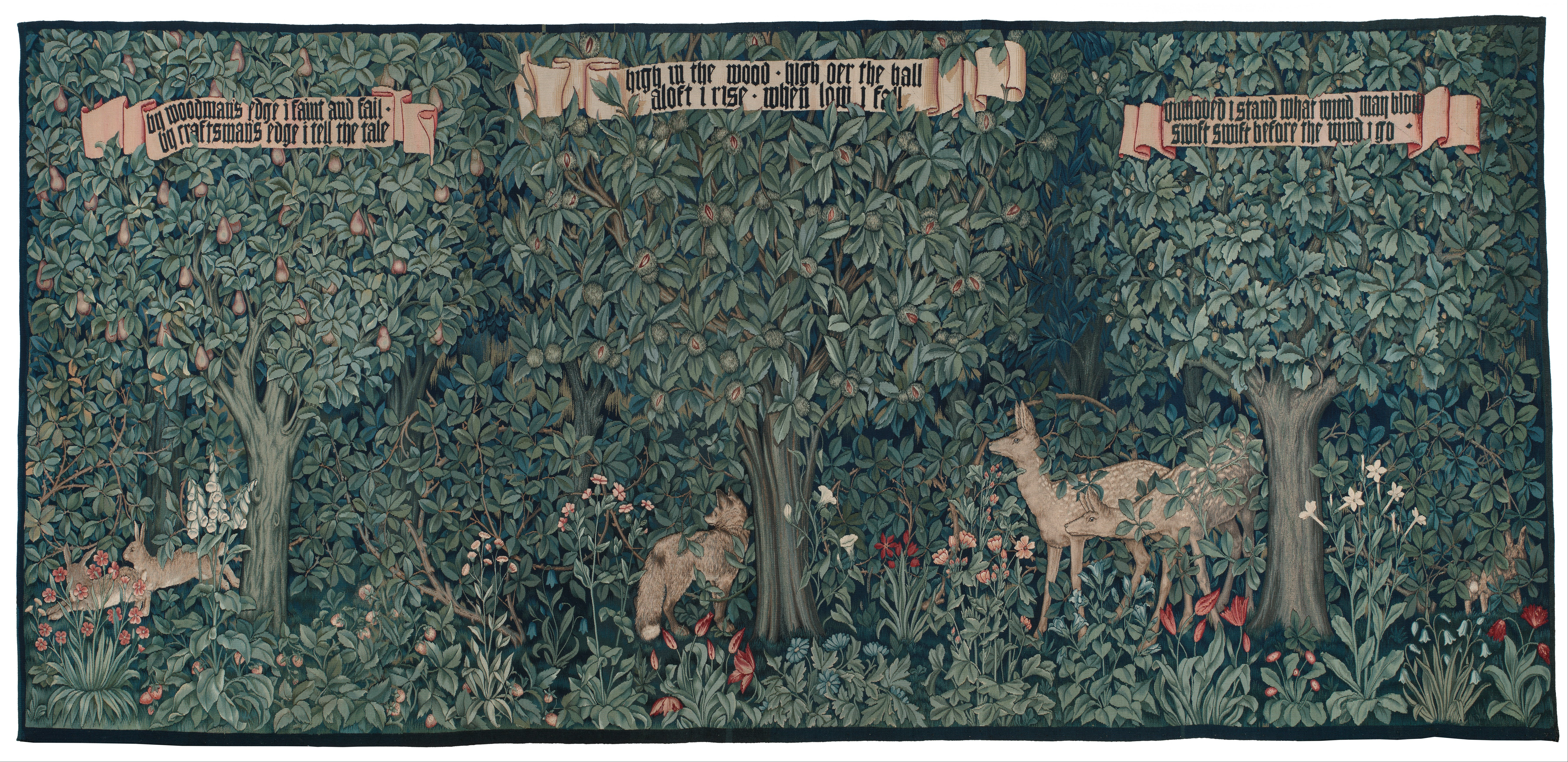
Greenery, Morris & Co tapestry designed for the hall at Clouds by J. H. Dearle, 1892

Carpets and wallpapers were supplied by Morris & Co. The main carpet for the drawing room, known as the Clouds carpet (designed by William Morris, 1885), is in the Fitzwilliam Museum, Cambridge. The carpet for the central hall was a version of the Holland Park carpet, which Morris had created for Aleco Ionides of 1 Holland Park, London, another Webb building project.

Greenery was the Morris & Co tapestry which Wyndham eventually commissioned to hang in the hall, after considering two others. Greenery (J. H. Dearle, 1892) is in the Museum of Fine Arts, Boston. The unsuccessful candidates were the design for The Forest (Morris and Dearle, with animal figures by Webb), which was subsequently woven in 1887 for Ionides and hung at 1 Holland Park, and The Orchard, also known as The Seasons (Morris and Dearle, 1890), which was woven and sent to Clouds but rejected.

Cartoons by Burne-Jones were also acquired for display at Clouds. Poesis and Musica were originally produced as portière designs for the Royal School of Art Needlework. The Ascension was a design for the Burne-Jones mosaics in St. Paul's Within the Walls, Rome; repainted by the artist, it hung in Clouds over the main staircase until destroyed in the 1889 fire.

The Wyndham Sisters: Lady Elcho, Mrs. Adeane, and Mrs. Tennant by John Singer Sargent hung in the billiards room.

== Later history ==
On Percy Wyndham's death in 1911, the Clouds estate was inherited by his son George Wyndham, who sold off a quarter of it. He installed electricity in the house, and commissioned architect Detmar Blow to convert existing rooms into a library and a chapel. In 1913 when George Wyndham died the estate passed to his son Percy Lyulph ("Perf") Wyndham. In 1914 Percy was killed in World War I and it passed to Guy Richard (Dick) Wyndham, the second son of George Wyndham's brother Guy. From 1924 he let the house out, and in 1936 sold the whole estate for £39,000, to a developer who immediately split it up, re-selling the house attached to only 26 acres (11 ha), for £3,300.

In 1938, alterations removed some original features including gables and the fireplace, and some of the hall space was converted into passageways. The house's main entrance, on the north side, was replaced with one on the west.

The house was sold again in 1944, to the Church of England Incorporated Society for Providing Homes for Waifs and Strays. In 1965 it became a school.

== Treatment centre ==
In 1983 the house became a treatment centre for drug dependence and alcohol dependence, founded under the name Clouds House by Peter and Margaret Ann McCann. The McCanns ran the centre until 1988 when they left to found the Castle Craig Hospital rehabilitation clinic in Scotland.

In May 2007 the Clouds House centre merged with Action on Addiction and the Chemical Dependency Centre, forming a new charity under the Action on Addiction name. The charity's head office is next to Clouds in East Knoyle. It offers an abstinence-based twelve-step programme, provided over a six-week residential stay.

== Births ==
Lady Cynthia Asquith was born at Clouds House in 1887.
