= Guy Wyndham =

British Army soldier (1865–1941)

Colonel Guy Wyndham CB MVO
- Born: Guy Percy Wyndham; 19 January 1865; St George Hanover Square, London, England
- Died: 17 April 1941 (aged 76); Marlborough, Wiltshire, England
- Burial place: Holy Cross Churchyard, Ramsbury, Wiltshire, England
- Occupation: British Army soldier
- Years active: 1884–1919
- Spouses: Edwina Brooke (m. 1892; died 1919) Violet Leverson (m. 1923)
- Children: 5, including Richard, Olivia and Francis
- Father: Percy Wyndham
- Relatives: Mary Constance Wyndham (sister); George Wyndham (brother); Pamela Wyndham (sister); Ada Leverson (mother-in-law)
- Family: Wyndham (paternal)

Colonel Guy Percy Wyndham, CB, MVO (19 January 1865 – 17 April 1941) was a British Army soldier.

== Background and family ==
Guy Percy Wyndham was born on 19 January 1865 in St George Hanover Square, London, as the son of Percy Wyndham, a Conservative politician, and his wife, Mary Caroline Frances Eden (née Campbell). He had four siblings, including Mary Constance Wyndham, George Wyndham and Pamela Wyndham.

He was married twice, first on 14 May 1892 at St Peter's Church, Eaton Square to Edwina Virginia Joanna Brooke (née Fitzpatrick), then on 11 June 1923 at St Ethelburga's Bishopsgate to Violet Lutetia Henrietta Leverson, daughter and biographer of the writer Ada Leverson. His first wife died during the Spanish flu pandemic on 4 October 1919. They had three children together, including the painter Richard Wyndham and the photographer Olivia Wyndham. He had two children through his second marriage, including the writer Francis Wyndham.

Wyndham died on 17 April 1941 in Marlborough, Wiltshire. He was 74. He was buried at Holy Cross Churchyard, Ramsbury.

== Military career ==
Wyndham was commissioned into the 16th (The Queen's) Lancers in October 1884.

He was promoted to captain on 10 September 1890, and became an adjutant in March 1892, a position he resigned in August 1894. He attended the Staff College, Camberley, from 1897 to 1898. On 21 September 1899 he was appointed to be a deputy assistant adjutant general in Natal.

On the outbreak of the Second Boer War just a few weeks later, Wyndham who was already in South Africa, was formally seconded to serve on the staff, and was present at battles leading to the Relief of Ladysmith. He was promoted to major on 1 April 1900, and was a Brigade Major to the 3rd Cavalry Brigade. During the latter parts of the war he was in command of a mobile column. For his services, he was mentioned in dispatches (including the final dispatch by Major General Lord Kitchener dated 23 June 1902), and received the brevet rank of lieutenant colonel, dated 29 November 1900, and returned to the United Kingdom on the steamer Dunvegan Castle in April 1902. The residents of his home village of Upwey, Dorset, had decorated the village on his arrival there. Two months later, he was received in audience by King Edward VII, who personally presented him with the King's South Africa Medal.

He was promoted to substantive lieutenant colonel in September 1904 and brevet colonel in October 1905 and was made a MVO in June 1908.

As British military attaché, an appointment he received in May 1907, in St. Petersburg, Russia, in 1909 he first warned his Austro-Hungarian counterpart that an Austro-Hungarian General Staff officer was supplying top secret information to the Russians. This information, however, ended up on the desk of Alfred Redl, head of counter-intelligence at the Evidenzbureau in Vienna, who unfortunately was the very spy being sought. He had been made a substantive colonel in September 1908.

Wyndham, relinquishing this assignment in May 1911 and made a CB in June 1913, was a member of The Souls. In November 1913 he became an assistant adjutant general at the War Office in London.

He served in the First World War, being made an inspector of reserve units in March 1915 and retired from the army in November 1919.

== Works ==
- Life and letters of George Wyndham. Guy Percy Wyndham, John William Mackail. London: Hutchinson, 1925. Two volumes.
