= Cass Canfield =

American historian (1897–1986)

- Born: Augustus Cass Canfield; April 26, 1897; New York City, U.S.
- Died: March 27, 1986 (aged 88); New York City, U.S.
- Education: Groton School; New College, Oxford; Harvard University, 1919
- Occupation: Publishing executive
- Known for: President and chairman of Harper & Brothers
- Spouses: Katherine Temple Emmet (m. 1922; div. 1937) Jane Sage White (m. 1938; died 1984) Joan H. King (m. 1984)
- Children: Cass and Michael
- Family: Lewis Cass (great grandfather)

Augustus Cass Canfield (April 26, 1897 – March 27, 1986) was an American publishing executive who was the longtime president and chairman of Harper & Brothers, later Harper & Row.

== Early life ==
Canfield was the son of Augustus Cass Canfield (1854–1904), a wealthy engineer and yachtsman, and his wife, the former Josephine Houghteling. His stepfather was Frank Gray Griswold, a relative of American bishop Frank Griswold. He also was a great-grandson of Presidential candidate Lewis Cass. He had two sisters, playwright Mary Cass Canfield and Laura Cass Canfield (Mrs William Lawrence Wood).

He attended the Groton School and Harvard University, graduating from Harvard in 1919 after serving as a lieutenant in the United States Army during World War I. Canfield also studied at New College, Oxford and trekked through Asia, retracing the route of Marco Polo.

== Career ==
After returning to New York, he worked as a reporter and advertising salesman for the New York Post. In 1924, he invested in Harper & Brothers and became manager of its London office. He held various executive positions with Harper's in London and New York between then and 1931; among the writers whom he signed to Harper's contracts were James Thurber, E. B. White, J. B. Priestley, Harold Laski, John Gunther, and Julian Huxley. EM Delafield dedicated The Provincial Lady Goes Further to him. It was thanks to Canfield that in 1958 John Updike's first book was published with Harper and Brothers.

Canfield was president of Harper & Brothers from 1931 to 1945, board chairman from 1945 to 1955, and chairman of the executive committee from 1955 to 1967. From 1967 until his death in 1986, he was House Senior Editor at Harper's. He also wrote seven nonfiction books.

Canfield was Rosenbach Fellow in Bibliography in 1968 at the University of Pennsylvania

=== Government and political activities ===
During World War II, Canfield took a leave of absence from Harper's to serve as a member of the Board of Economic Warfare, the Foreign Economic Administration, and the United States Office of War Information. He was a founder of the journal Foreign Affairs.

Canfield campaigned for Adlai Stevenson in 1956. He was a strong supporter of birth control, served as chair of the executive committee of Planned Parenthood, and traveled extensively giving speeches and raising money to support the organization.

== Personal life ==
Canfield married three times. In 1922, he married his first wife, Katherine Temple Emmet, a descendant of New York State Attorney General Thomas Addis Emmet. Before their divorce in June 1937, they were the parents of two sons:

- Cass Canfield Jr. (1923–2013), a senior executive at Harper & Row who married Lili Finletter, daughter of Thomas K. Finletter, in 1947, Sidney Howard in 1954, and Abigail Brosius Angell in 1973.
- Michael Temple Canfield (1926–1969), who was adopted by the Canfields. He was a London representative of Harper & Row who became the first husband of Lee Radziwill. He married secondly the former Frances Laura Charteris (who had been divorced from the 2nd Viscount Long and the 3rd Earl of Dudley). After his death, his widow married the 10th Duke of Marlborough (the eldest son of Consuelo Vanderbilt).

After their divorce, Katherine married, in October 1937, John D. W. Churchill. According to the memoirs of Loelia, Duchess of Westminster, King Edward VIII of the United Kingdom believed that Michael Canfield was actually the biological son of his brother Prince George, Duke of Kent and socialite Kiki Preston.

In 1938, Canfield married his second wife, Jane Sage White, an author and sculptor. She was the former wife of Charles Fairchild Fuller and a relative of Ernest Ingersoll. By this marriage Canfield had three stepchildren: Jane Sage Fuller, Blair Fairchild Fuller, and Isabelle Whitney "Jill" Fuller. They remained married until Jane's death in 1984.

In 1984, Canfield married Joan H. King. They remained married until his death in 1986.

== Quote ==
I am a publisher — a hybrid creature: one part star gazer, one part gambler, one part businessman, one part midwife and three parts optimist.

== Bibliography ==
- The Publishing Experience (1969)
- Up and Down and Around (1971)
- The Incredible Pierpont Morgan (1974)
- Samuel Adams' Revolution (1976)
- The Iron Will of Jefferson Davis (1978)
- Outrageous Fortunes: The Story of the Medici, the Rothschilds and J. Pierpont Morgan (1981)
- The Six (1983)
