= Michael Temple Canfield =

American diplomatic aide (1926–1969)

- Born: Anthony Karslake; August 20, 1926; Bern, Switzerland
- Died: December 20, 1969 (aged 43); Halifax, Nova Scotia, Canada
- Education: Brooks School; Harvard University
- Spouses: Caroline Lee Bouvier (m. 1953; div. 1958) Frances, Countess of Dudley (m. 1960)
- Parent(s): Cass Canfield; Katherine Temple Emmet Canfield

Michael Temple Canfield (born Anthony Kerslake; August 20, 1926 – December 20, 1969) was an American diplomatic aide and secretary at the US Embassy in London during the Eisenhower administration who later worked in London as an editorial representative of Harper & Row. He was the first husband of Caroline Lee Bouvier.

== Early life ==
As an infant, he was adopted by Katherine Temple (née Emmet) Canfield, a descendant of Irish immigrant and New York State Attorney General Thomas Addis Emmet, and her then husband, Cass Canfield, a publishing executive who was the longtime president and chairman of Harper & Brothers and, later, Harper & Row. His older brother was Cass Canfield Jr., also a publishing executive. His parents divorced in June 1937 and his father remarried to Jane Sage (née White) Fuller (1897–1984), an author and sculptor. She was the former wife of Charles Fairchild Fuller and a relative of Ernest Ingersoll.

=== Disputed paternity ===
According to the memoirs of Loelia, Duchess of Westminster, Edward VIII believed that Canfield was actually the biological son of his brother Prince George, Duke of Kent (the fourth son of King George V) and Kiki Preston, a "glamorous but drug-addicted American socialite who was a member of Kenya’s notorious Happy Valley set". Preston died by suicide on December 23, 1946.

== Education and career ==
Canfield attended the Brooks School in North Andover, Massachusetts on the shores of Lake Cochichewick, before serving in the United States Marine Corps during World War II where he was wounded at Iwo Jima. After the war, he returned to the U.S. where he attended Harvard College (where he was a member of the Hasty Pudding Institute of 1770 and A.D. Club), graduating in 1951.

After Harvard, he went to London as an aide to Winthrop W. Aldrich and secretary to John Hay Whitney when they were Ambassadors to the Court of St James under President Dwight D. Eisenhower.

He later worked in London as an editorial representative of Harper & Row where his father was publisher. In London, he lived at Canfield House in Eaton Square and was elected a member of White's, the elite gentleman's club in St James's. In New York, he was a member of the Knickerbocker Club.

== Personal life ==
Canfield married Caroline Lee Bouvier (known as “Lee”) on April 18, 1953, at the Holy Trinity Catholic Church in Washington, D.C. Bouvier was the younger of two daughters of stockbroker John Vernou Bouvier III and his wife, socialite Janet Norton Lee (later married to Hugh D. Auchincloss). A few months after their wedding, Bouvier's older sister Jacqueline married U.S. Senator, and future President, John F. Kennedy. Canfield was an usher while Bouvier was matron of honor to her sister. Canfield and Bouvier divorced in 1958, and the marriage was annulled by the Catholic Church in November 1962. In March 1959, Bouvier married the Polish aristocrat Prince Stanisław Radziwill.

On June 13, 1960, Canfield married Laura Charteris in a civil ceremony in the registrar's office at Amersham, Buckinghamshire followed by a reception at Laura's country home, Hertfordshire House, Coleshill. She was the sister of novelist Hugo Charteris, Ann Charteris the wife of Ian Fleming, and Mary Rose Charteris. The siblings were the grandchildren of Hugo Charteris, 11th Earl of Wemyss. Laura was twice divorced, firstly from Walter Long, 2nd Viscount Long and secondly from William Ward, 3rd Earl of Dudley. Laura's second husband, William Ward, 3rd Earl of Dudley, married thirdly Grace Maria (née Kolin) Radziwill (1923–2016), daughter of Dr. Michael Kolin and Anna Tironi of Dubrovnik, Yugoslavia. Grace was the second wife of Prince Stanislaus Radziwill. The Prince's third wife was Canfield's first wife, Lee Radziwiłł.

== Death ==
On December 20, 1969, Canfield died of a heart attack at the age of 43 while on a BOAC flight from New York to London. His widow married for the fourth time to John Spencer-Churchill, 10th Duke of Marlborough, the eldest son of the American heiress Consuelo Vanderbilt and her former husband, Charles Spencer-Churchill, 9th Duke of Marlborough.
