= Sara Morrison =

British politician (born 1934)

The Honourable Sara Morrison FRSA
- Born: Antoinette Sara Frances Sibell Long; 9 August 1934 (age 92); Kensington, London, England
- Employer(s): General Electric Company; Abbey National; Carlton TV; Imperial College London
- Organization: World Wide Fund for Nature
- Political party: Conservative Party (UK)
- Spouse: Charles Morrison (m. 1954; div. 1984)
- Children: 2
- Parents: Walter Long, 2nd Viscount Long; Frances Laura Charteris
- Relatives: Walter Long (paternal grandfather); Hugo Charteris (uncle); Ann Fleming (aunt)
- Honours: Fellow of the Royal Society of Arts

Antoinette Sara Frances Sibell Morrison (née Long, born 9 August 1934) is a British politician, businesswoman and philanthropist. She was vice-chairman of the Conservative Party from 1971 to 1975 and worked for companies including the General Electric Company, Abbey National bank and Carlton TV. She was also Chairperson of World Wide Fund for Nature (WWF) UK.

== Family ==
Morrison was born as the Hon. Antoinette Sara Frances Sibell Long on 9 August 1934 in Kensington, London. Her father was the peer and soldier Walter Long, 2nd Viscount Long, and her mother was Frances Laura Charteris.

As a sixteen-month-old infant in 1935, Morrison featured on the cover of Tatler magazine with her mother. On her maternal side, Morrison's uncle was novelist and screenwriter Hugo Charteris and her aunt was society hostess Ann Fleming.

Morrison's parents divorced in 1942. Her father was killed in action at Uden, Netherlands in 1944, while serving with the Coldstream Guards in World War II. Her mother married three more times, firstly to William Ward, 3rd Earl of Dudley, secondly to Michael Temple Canfield, and thirdly to John Spencer-Churchill, 10th Duke of Marlborough.

Morrison was the last member of the Long family to live at South Wraxall Manor in South Wraxall, Wiltshire.

On 28 October 1954, Morrison married landowner and Conservative politician Charles Morrison, the second son of John Morrison, 1st Baron Margadale and the Honourable Margaret Esther Lucie Smith. They had two children: a daughter Anabel Laura Dorothy Morrison and a son David John Morrison, who had Princess Alexandra of Kent as a godmother. The marriage ended in divorce in 1984.

== Career ==
Morrison was elected county councillor then alderman for the county of Wiltshire between 1961 and 1971. She was vice-chairman of the national Conservative Party from 1971 to 1975. Morrison was a close friend of Leader of the Conservative Party and prime minister Edward Heath.

In business, Morrison worked for the General Electric Company (GEC) from 1975 to 1998 and was a director from 1980 to 1998. She was a non-executive director of Abbey National bank from 1979 to 1995. She held the office of governor of Imperial College London in 1986 and was appointed Honorary Fellow in 1993. She was a director of Carlton TV in 1992.

On 1 January 1998 Morrison became chairperson of World Wide Fund for Nature (WWF) UK and was elected to the board of WWF International. She was elected vice-president of WWF International in November 2000 and became an emeritus member in 2005.

== Honours ==
Morrison was appointed a Life Fellow of the Royal Society of Arts (FRSA) in 1986.

Morrison was awarded an Honorary DSc by the University of Buckingham in 2000. She also holds Honorary degrees from Coventry University and De Montfort University.
