= Eric Long, 3rd Viscount Long =

British Conservative Party politician and Territorial Army officer

Eric Long in 1929

Richard Eric Onslow Long, 3rd Viscount Long, TD, DL (22 August 1892 – 12 January 1967) was a British Conservative Party politician and Territorial Army officer.

== Background ==
Long was a member of a long-established Wiltshire family. He was the younger son of Walter Long, 1st Viscount Long, by Lady Dorothy Blanche, daughter of Richard Boyle, 9th Earl of Cork. He was the younger brother of Brigadier-General Walter Long, and the nephew of Lord Gisborough. He was educated at Harrow School.

In 1922 Long was initiated into Freemasonry in the Chaloner Lodge No. 2644, meeting at Melksham. Later he also joined the Lodge of Assistance No. 2773, meeting in central London. He became a Justice of the Peace in 1923.

== Political career ==
Long was elected to the House of Commons as Member of Parliament (MP) for Westbury at a by-election in 1927, following the death of the sitting Conservative MP Walter Shaw. He was re-elected at the 1929 general election, but stood down at the 1931 election.

== Military career ==
Long served in World War I, when he was mentioned in dispatches. Between the wars he reached the rank of Major in the part-time Royal Wiltshire Yeomanry. He served again in World War II, becoming Commander of 329 Battery in 32nd Searchlight Regiment, Royal Artillery (7th City of London) in 1941, based at Carlton Hall near Saxmundham, Suffolk. He was asked to resign in 1942.

After the war, he became Honorary Colonel of 604 Searchlight Regiment, Royal Artillery (Royal Fusiliers).

== Personal life ==
In 1944, his nephew Walter Long, 2nd Viscount Long was killed in action in the war. Walter had no male heirs, so Long succeeded to his nephew's titles, becoming the 3rd Viscount Long. Prior to this he had been generally known as "Major Eric Long". In 1946 he was appointed Deputy Lieutenant of Wiltshire.

Lord Long married Gwendolyn Hague-Cook in 1916, and they had four children:

- Walter Reginald Basil Long, born 13 December 1918, served in World War II as Lieutenant, Royal Artillery, drowned on active service in Greece, 28 April 1941
- Noreen Long, born 21 January 1921, married Major John Cairns Bartholomew, Royal Wiltshire Yeomanry
- Richard Gerald Long, born 29 January 1929, who succeeded his father as 4th Viscount Long
- John Hume Long, born 4 July 1930, died 31 July 2010.

Gwendolyn died in 1959.

Viscount Long died at a Bath hospital on 12 January 1967, aged 74, and is buried in the family vault at West Ashton, Wiltshire. According to his obituary in The Times, he once described the Socialists as 'dangerous beasts'. When women peers were introduced into the House of Lords he said: "I will of course speak to them if they thrust their presence in my face, but otherwise I will do my best to overlook them". He said of women that they had "not a clue" about politics.

== Awards ==
Viscount Long held the following awards:

- Knight Commander, Order of George I of Greece
- Freedom of the City of Athens (1947)
- Territorial Decoration

== Notes ==
Parliament of the United Kingdom
Preceded by Walter William Shaw	Member of Parliament for Westbury; 1927 – 1931	Succeeded by Robert Grimston
Peerage of the United Kingdom
Preceded by Walter Long	Viscount Long; 1944 – 1967	Succeeded by Richard Long
