= Viscount Long =

Viscountcy in the Peerage of the United Kingdom

Viscountcy Long
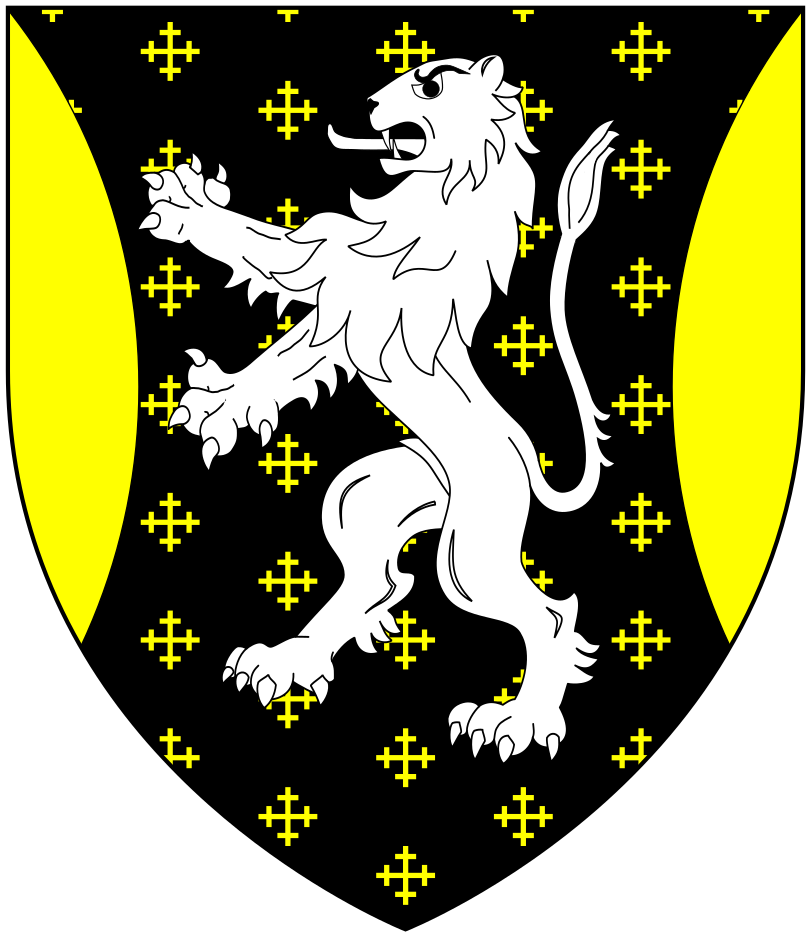
- Arms: Sable, semée of Crosses-Crosslet Or, a Lion rampant Argent, between two Flaunches Or. Crest: A Lion’s Head Argent, erased Or, holding in the mouth a dexter Hand erased Gules. Supporters: on either side a Lion Argent, holding a Flagstaff erect proper, flowing therefrom a Pennon Sable, that on the dexter charged with a Portcullis chained and that on the sinister a Fetterlock Or.
- Creation date: 4 June 1921
- Created by: King George V
- Peerage: Peerage of the United Kingdom
- First holder: Walter Long
- Present holder: James Long, 5th Viscount Long
- Remainder to: the 1st Viscount’s heirs male of the body lawfully begotten
- Status: Extant
- Former seat: Rood Ashton House (demolished)
- Motto: PIEUX QUOIQUE PREUX (Pious though valiant)

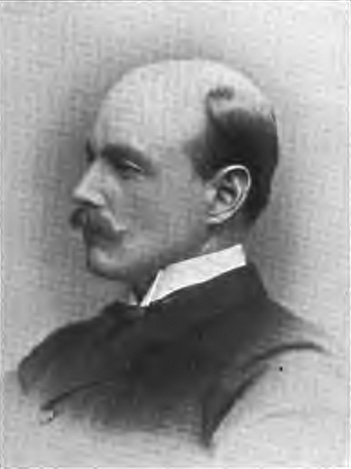
Walter Long, 1st Viscount Long

Viscount Long, of Wraxall in the County of Wiltshire, is a title in the Peerage of the United Kingdom.

The title was created in 1921 for the Conservative politician Walter Long, who had previously served as Member of Parliament, President of the Board of Agriculture, President of the Local Government Board, Secretary of State for the Colonies and First Lord of the Admiralty. His grandson, the second Viscount (son of Brigadier General Walter Long) was killed in action in the Second World War. He was succeeded by his uncle, the third Viscount, who had earlier represented Westbury in Parliament as a Conservative. The title was next held by his son, the fourth Viscount, who served as a government whip from 1979 to 1997 in the Conservative administrations of Margaret Thatcher and John Major. Lord Long lost his seat in the House of Lords after the passing of the House of Lords Act 1999. As of 2017 the title is held by the latter's son, the fifth Viscount, who succeeded in that year.

Richard Chaloner, 1st Baron Gisborough, was the younger brother of the first Viscount. Child actress Charlotte Long was the daughter of the fourth Viscount.

== Viscounts Long (1921) ==
- Walter Hume Long, 1st Viscount Long (1854–1924)
  - Walter Long (1879–1917)
- Walter Francis David Long, 2nd Viscount Long (1911–1944)
- Richard Eric Onslow Long, 3rd Viscount Long (1892–1967)
- Richard Gerard Long, 4th Viscount Long (1929–2017)
- James Richard Long, 5th Viscount Long (b. 1960)

There is no heir to the title.

== See also ==
- Baron Gisborough
- Long family of Wiltshire
- Rood Ashton House
