= Alice Gwynne =

Alice Gwynne may refer to:

- Alice Claypoole Vanderbilt (née Gwynne; 1845–1934), American socialite, wife of Cornelius Vanderbilt II
- Kiki Preston (née Alice Gwynne; 1898–1946), American socialite, a grand-niece of Alice Vanderbilt
