= Laura Spencer-Churchill, Duchess of Marlborough =

British noblewoman and socialite

Her Grace The Duchess of Marlborough
- Born: Frances Laura Charteris; 10 August 1915; London, England
- Died: 19 February 1990 (aged 74); Portman Towers, Marylebone, London, England
- Spouses: Walter Long, 2nd Viscount Long (m. 1933; div. 1942) William Ward, 3rd Earl of Dudley (m. 1943; div. 1954) Michael Temple Canfield (m. 1960; died 1969) John Spencer-Churchill, 10th Duke of Marlborough (m. 1972; died 1972)
- Children: Sara Morrison
- Parents: Guy Charteris (father); Frances Lucy Tennant (mother)
- Relatives: Hugo Charteris (brother); Ann Fleming (sister); Martin Charteris (cousin); Francis David Charteris, 12th Earl of Wemyss (cousin)

Frances Laura Spencer-Churchill, Duchess of Marlborough (née Charteris; later Long, Dudley and Canfield; 10 August 1915 – 19 February 1990), was a British peeress and socialite.

A granddaughter of Hugo Charteris, 11th Earl of Wemyss, she was the sister of novelist Hugo Charteris and Ann Charteris, wife of Ian Fleming. She married four times, three of her husbands being peers, and thus was successively styled Viscountess Long, Countess of Dudley, and Duchess of Marlborough. During World War II, she served as an auxiliary nurse.

== Early life ==
Frances Laura Charteris was born on 10 August 1915 at London to Captain the Hon. Guy Lawrence Charteris (1886–1967), second son of Hugo Charteris, 11th Earl of Wemyss and 7th Earl of March, and Mary Constance Wyndham, and his wife Frances Lucy Tennant (1887–1925), granddaughter of Sir Charles Tennant, 1st Baronet. She went by her second name, Laura. She had three siblings: Ann, Mary Rose and Hugo.

Laura's mother died of cancer in 1925 and the remainder of her childhood was spent shuffling between homes in London and family in Scotland, where their paternal grandparents, the Earl and Countess of Wemyss and March, lived. During World War II, she served as an auxiliary nurse for the Royal Navy.

== Marriages ==
On 14 November 1933, at St Margaret's, Westminster, Laura married her first husband, Walter, 2nd Viscount Long. Her only child was born of this marriage:

- Antoinette Sara Frances Sibell Long, who married the Hon. Charles Morrison, second son of John, 1st Baron Margadale, in 1954.

The Viscount and Viscountess Long were divorced in 1942.

Laura married secondly William, 3rd Earl of Dudley, on 23 February 1943. She was styled Countess of Dudley until their divorce in 1954. Dudley later married, as his third wife, Grace Maria Radziwiłł (née Kolin; 1923–2016). Grace had previously been married to Prince Stanisław Radziwiłł, whose third wife was Lee Radziwill. Lee had formerly been married to Michael Temple Canfield, who later became Laura's third husband.

On 13 June 1960, Laura married Michael Temple Canfield, rumoured to have been the son of Prince George, Duke of Kent and American socialite Alice Gwynne Preston. Canfield was adopted as an infant by Cass Canfield, head of Harper & Row Publishing house with his wife Katharine Emmet. Michael Canfield was the previous husband of Princess Lee Radziwill, the younger sister of former First Lady Jacqueline Bouvier Kennedy Onassis and sister-in-law of President John F. Kennedy.

Her fourth and final husband was John Albert William Spencer-Churchill, 10th Duke of Marlborough, whom she married six weeks before his death in 1972. From the time of this marriage, she became known as the Duchess of Marlborough.

Laura died on 19 February 1990 at age 74 at Portman Towers, Marylebone, London, England.

== Autobiography ==
In 1980, she published her autobiography, Laughter from a Cloud. London: Weidenfeld and Nicolson, 1980 (ISBN 978-0-297-77739-7)

== In popular culture ==
During the 2014-2015 exhibition at London's National Portrait Gallery, she was featured among the high-profile American heiresses to marry into British aristocracy. Also included in the exhibition were Margaret Leiter (married to the 19th Earl of Suffolk), Jennie Jerome (married to Lord Randolph Churchill), Mary Leiter (married to the 1st Marquess Curzon of Kedleston), May Cuyler (married to Sir Philip Grey Egerton, 12th Bt), Consuelo Yznaga (married to the 8th Duke of Manchester), Consuelo Vanderbilt (married to the 9th Duke of Marlborough and to Jacques Balsan) and Cornelia Martin (married to the 4th Earl of Craven).

== Titles ==
- 1915 — 1933: Miss Frances Laura Charteris
- 1933 — 1942: The Right Honourable The Viscountess Long
- 1942 — 1943: Frances, Viscountess Long
- 1943 — 1954: The Right Honourable The Countess of Dudley
- 1954 — 1960: Frances, Countess of Dudley
- 1960 — 1971: Mrs Michael Temple Canfield
- 1972 — 1972: Her Grace The Duchess of Marlborough
- 1972 — 1977: Her Grace Laura Spencer-Churchill, Duchess of Marlborough
- 1977 — 1990: Her Grace The Dowager Duchess of Marlborough
