= This Mortal Coil (book) =

1947 short story collection by Cynthia Asquith

- Dust-jacket illustration by Ronald Clyne for This Mortal Coil by Cynthia Asquith
- Author: Cynthia Asquith
- Cover artist: Ronald Clyne
- Language: English
- Genre: Fantasy, horror
- Publisher: Arkham House
- Publication date: 1947
- Publication place: United States
- Media type: Print (hardback)
- Pages: 245 pp

This Mortal Coil is a collection of fantasy and horror short stories by author Cynthia Asquith. It was released in 1947 and was the only collection of the author's stories to be published by Arkham House. It was published in an edition of 2,609 copies.

James Barrie reprinted this collection as What Dreams May Come (1951), omitting "The Follower," and "The Nurse Never Told" retitled as "From What Beginnings?". Some sources suggest that the stories were heavily edited and revised by the author for the Barrie edition.

== Contents ==
This Mortal Coil contains the following tales:

1. "In a Nutshell"
2. "The White Moth"
3. "The Corner Shop"
4. "'God Grante That She Lye Stille'"
5. "The Playfellow"
6. "The Nurse Never Told"
7. "The Lovely Voice"
8. "The First Night"
9. "The Follower"

== Adaptations ==
"God Grante That She Lye Stille" was adapted in 1961 by Robert Hardy Andrews as an episode of the anthology TV series Thriller.
