= Charles Morrison =

British landowner and Conservative politician

The Honourable Sir Charles Morrison

Member of Parliament for Devizes
- In office 14 May 1964 – 16 March 1992
- Preceded by: H. Percivall Pott
- Succeeded by: Michael Ancram

Personal details
- Born: Charles Andrew Morrison; 25 June 1932 London, England
- Died: 9 May 2005 (aged 72) London, England
- Spouses: Antoinette Frances Sibell Long (m. 1954; div. 1984) Rosalind Elizabeth Ward (m. 1984; div. 1999)
- Relations: Peter Morrison (brother); Mary Anne Morrison (sister)
- Parent: John Morrison, 1st Baron Margadale
- Education: Eton College; University of Cambridge; Royal Agricultural College

Sir Charles Andrew Morrison (25 June 1932 – 9 May 2005) was a British landowner and Conservative Party politician. He served as member of parliament for Devizes from 1964 until 1992.

== Early life ==
Morrison was born in London, the son of John Morrison, a Wiltshire landowner and Conservative member of parliament who was later ennobled as Baron Margadale (entitling his son to the honorific "The Honourable"), and was educated at Eton. Morrison was the brother of Peter Morrison, who became member of parliament for Chester, while his sister, Dame Mary Morrison, was a Woman of the Bedchamber to Queen Elizabeth II for over fifty years.

Morrison's great-great-grandfather James Morrison created the family's great fortune by stockpiling black crepe fabric in readiness for the mourning of King William IV in 1837, becoming known as "the richest commoner in the Empire". In the 1830s, he circumvented high tariffs on pairs of gloves by importing right-handed gloves through Yarmouth, Isle of Wight, and left-handed ones through Southampton.

After Eton and National Service in the Life Guards, Morrison went up to Cambridge for two years, but left, explaining later that "I was just wasting my time and didn't feel like a third year... But I did leave voluntarily." He then trained at the Royal Agricultural College, Cirencester, before starting work on managing the family estates.

== Career ==
In 1958, Morrison became a member of Wiltshire County Council and chaired its Education Committee in 1963–1964. He entered Parliament in May 1964 at a by-election in the Devizes constituency which followed the death of Percivall Pott, holding the seat for the Conservatives against all opinion poll forecasts and against the trend in three other by-elections held on the same day. This was put down to his being well-known, popular and active in the constituency. His campaign had the support of Ian Fleming, a relation by marriage of Morrison's wife Sara, who wrote an article called To Westminster with Love beginning with the words "Charles Morrison - Licensed to Kill."

Soon after his election to parliament, Morrison supported Ted Heath's bid for the party leadership and went on to serve as shadow minister for sport. However, when his party returned to power under Heath in 1970, Morrison failed to be given a job in the new government. In 1966, Morrison bought Fyfield Manor near Pewsey in Wiltshire from the former prime minister Anthony Eden. As a landowner and Conservative Party MP his moderate views did not find favour with Prime Minister Margaret Thatcher. He continued as MP for Devizes until his retirement in 1992, when he was succeeded by Michael Ancram. He was knighted in 1988.

== Personal life ==
Morrison married firstly, on 28 October 1954, Antoinette Sara Frances Sibell Long, the only child of the 2nd Viscount Long and his wife Viscountess (Frances) Laura Long (née Charteris). They had two children, a daughter Anabel and a son David, who had Princess Alexandra of Kent as a godmother. The marriage ended in divorce in 1984.

In 1984 he married secondly Rosalind Elizabeth Ward (née Lygon) (1946–2020) of Madresfield. They also divorced, in 1999.

Morrison died from cancer in a London hospital on 9 May 2005, at the age of 72.

Parliament of the United Kingdom
| Preceded by H. Percivall Pott | Member of Parliament for Devizes; 1964–1992 | Succeeded by Michael Ancram |
