= Lady Cynthia Asquith =

English writer and socialite (1887–1960)

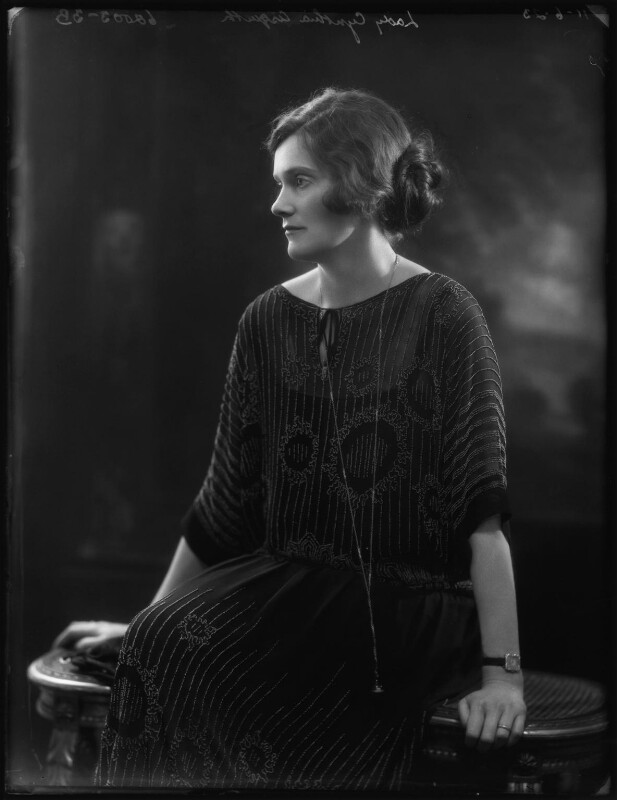
- Born: Cynthia Mary Evelyn Charteris; 27 September 1887; Clouds House, East Knoyle, Wiltshire, England
- Died: 31 March 1960 (aged 72); Oxford, England
- Occupation: Writer
- Years active: 1926–1960
- Spouse: Herbert Asquith (m. 1910; died 1947)
- Children: 3
- Parents: Hugo Richard Charteris, 11th Earl of Wemyss; Mary Constance Wyndham

Lady Cynthia Mary Evelyn Asquith (née Charteris; 27 September 1887 – 31 March 1960) was an English writer and socialite, known for her ghost stories and diaries. She also wrote novels, edited a number of anthologies, wrote for children and covered the British Royal family.

== Early life ==
Lady Cynthia was born at Clouds House, East Knoyle, Wiltshire on 27 September 1887, one of seven children of Hugo Richard Charteris, 11th Earl of Wemyss (1857–1937), and Mary Constance Wyndham, of The Souls fame. Among her siblings were Hugo Francis Charteris, Lord Elcho (who married Lady Violet Manners, the daughter of Henry Manners, 8th Duke of Rutland, and was killed in action in the Great War), Guy Lawrence Charteris, Colin Charteris (who died young), Lady Mary Charteris (wife of Capt. Algernon Walter Strickland and, after his death, John George Lyon), Yvo Alan Charteris (also killed in action during the Great War), and Lady Irene Charteris (wife of Ivor Windsor-Clive, 2nd Earl of Plymouth).

Her paternal grandparents were Francis Charteris, 10th Earl of Wemyss and his first wife Lady Anne Frederica Anson (second daughter of Thomas Anson, 1st Earl of Lichfield). Her maternal grandparents were Capt. Hon. Percy Scawen Wyndham MP for Cumberland West (second son of George Wyndham, 1st Baron Leconfield), and the former Madeleine Eden Campbell (sixth daughter of Maj.-Gen. Sir Guy Campbell, 1st Baronet).

== Career ==
In 1913, Asquith met D. H. Lawrence in Margate and became a friend and correspondent. She took a position as secretary to the Peter Pan creator J. M. Barrie, with whom she became close friends, continuing to work for him until his death in 1937. Barrie left most of his estate to her, except for the Peter Pan works. Author L. P. Hartley became a lifelong friend after they met in the early 1920s.

Asquith became known for editing The Ghost Book, an anthology of supernatural fiction, including work by D. H. Lawrence, Algernon Blackwood, Arthur Machen, Oliver Onions, and May Sinclair.

One of Asquith's stories, "The Follower", was adapted for BBC Radio, along with others by Algernon Blackwood, Marjorie Bowen, and Noel Streatfeild; all were later reprinted in the Cecil Madden anthology My Grimmest Nightmare (1935). She contributed to the screenplay of the 1937 film Dreaming Lips, which starred Elisabeth Bergner.

In 1957, Asquith appeared as a contestant in the ITV Quiz show The 64,000 Question (hosted by Jerry Desmonde) where she won the top prize of £3,200 answering questions on the works of Jane Austen.

== Personal life ==
On 28 July 1910, Lady Cynthia married Herbert Asquith (1881–1947), second son of H. H. Asquith, the Liberal Prime Minister of the United Kingdom from 1908 to 1916, with whom he is sometimes confused. They had three children:

- John Michael Asquith (1911–1937), who suffered mental problems and died in an institution.
- Michael Henry Asquith (1914–2004), who married in 1938 Diana Eveline Montagu Battye, daughter of Lt.-Col. Perceval Lawrence Montagu Battye. They divorced in 1952; he married secondly Helga Brigitta Ebba Elizabeth Ritter, daughter of Dr Walther Sigmund Casimir Ritter, in 1953.
- Simon Roland Anthony Asquith (1919–1973), who married in 1942 Vivien Lawrence Jones, daughter of Sir Lawrence Jones, 5th Baronet and Lady Evelyn Alice Grey (a daughter of Albert Grey, 4th Earl Grey)

Lady Cynthia's husband died in Bath on 5 August 1947 aged 66, and Lady Cynthia herself on 31 March 1960, aged 72.

== Works ==
- The child at home (1923)
- Sails of Gold (1927)
- The Duchess of York (1927), biography
- The treasure cave, a book of new prose and verse (1928)
- Haply I May Remember (1930)
- She Walks In Beauty (1934)
- The Spring House (1936), novel
- Her Majesty The Queen. An Entirely New And Complete Biography. Written With The Approval Of Her Majesty (1937)
- The Family Life of Queen Elizabeth (1937)
- The King’s Daughters (1938), biography
- Dreaming Lips (1937), screenplay
- One Sparkling Wave (1943), novel
- This Mortal Coil (1947), stories: "In a Nutshell", "The White Moth", "The Corner Shop", "'God Grante That She Lye Stille'", "The Playfellow", "The Nurse Never Told", "The Lovely Voice", "The First Night", "The Follower"
- Haply I May Remember (1950)
- What Dreams May Come (1951), stories (contents the same as This Mortal Coil, but with "The Follower" omitted and "The Nurse Never Told" retitled as "From What Beginnings?")
- Remember and be Glad (1952)
- Portrait of Barrie (1954)
- Married to Tolstoy (1960), biography
- Lady Cynthia Asquith Diaries 1915–1918 (1968)
- Thomas Hardy at Max Gate (1969)

=== As editor ===
- The Flying Carpet (1925)
- Treasure Ship (1926)
- The Ghost Book (1927)
- The Black Cap (1928)
- The Funny Bone (1928)
- Shudders (1929)
- The Children's Cargo (1930)
- When Churchyards Yawn (1931)
- My Grimmest Nightmare (1935)
- The Second Ghost Book (1952)
- The Third Ghost Book (1955)

== Adaptations ==
"'God Grante That She Lye Stille'", first published in When Churchyards Yawn, was adapted in 1961 by Robert Hardy Andrews as an episode of the anthology TV series Thriller.

== See also ==
- List of horror fiction authors
- List of science fiction editors
