= Richard Long, 4th Viscount Long =

British peer and Conservative politician

The Right Honourable The Viscount Long CBE

Lord-in-waiting Government Whip
- In office 9 May 1979 – 2 May 1997
- Prime Minister: Margaret Thatcher; John Major
- Preceded by: The Lord Leonard
- Succeeded by: The Lord Whitty

Member of the House of Lords Lord Temporal
- In office 12 January 1967 – 11 November 1999; Hereditary Peerage
- Preceded by: The 3rd Viscount Long
- Succeeded by: Seat abolished

Personal details
- Born: 30 January 1929 London, England
- Died: 13 June 2017 (aged 88)
- Party: Conservative
- Spouse(s): Margaret Frances Frazer (m. 1957; div. 1984) Catherine Patricia Elizabeth Miles-Ede (m. 1984; div. 1990) Helen Millar Wright Fleming-Gibbons (m. 1990)
- Children: 3

Richard Gerard Long, 4th Viscount Long, CBE (30 January 1929 – 13 June 2017) was a British peer and Conservative politician.

== Life and career ==
Born in London, the second son of Richard Long, 3rd Viscount Long, he was educated at Harrow and served with the 1st and 2nd Battalions of the Wiltshire Regiment from 1947 to 1949. His elder brother, Walter Reginald Basil, had died in Greece in 1941 during World War II and Long succeeded to his father's title in 1967.

In 1974, he entered politics as an Opposition Whip and was then a Lord-in-waiting (senior Government whip) from 1979 to 1997.

Long was appointed a Commander of the Order of the British Empire (CBE) in the 1993 New Year Honours.

== Marriages and family ==
Viscount Long lived for many years at Steeple Ashton Manor, and later at The Island, Newquay, Cornwall, a house on a rock linked to the mainland by a private suspension bridge.

He was married three times and had three children by his first wife, Margaret (1928–2016).

- The Hon. Sarah Long (b. 1958)
- James Richard Long (b. 1960), 5th Viscount Long
- The Hon. Charlotte Long (1965–1984), an actress, who was killed in a car accident on 6 October 1984 at the age of 18.

He died on 13 June 2017, at the age of 88. His funeral service was held at St Mary's Church, Steeple Ashton, on 29 June 2017. He was succeeded by his son James as 5th Viscount Long.

Peerage of the United Kingdom
Preceded by Richard Eric Onslow Long	Viscount Long; 1967–2017	Succeeded by James Long
