= Christopher Hollis (politician) =

British politician (1902–1977)

Maurice Christopher Hollis, known as Christopher Hollis (2 December 1902 – 5 May 1977), was a British schoolmaster, university teacher, author and Conservative politician.

== Life ==
Hollis was born at Wells, Somerset, in 1902, one of the four sons of George Arthur Hollis (1868–1944), vice-principal of the Wells Theological College and later Bishop of Taunton. He was educated at Eton and Balliol College, Oxford, where he was president of the Oxford Union Society and a member of the Hypocrites' Club. He travelled as a member of the Union's debating team to the United States, New Zealand and Australia. At Oxford he met his lifelong friend Douglas Woodruff. He was a friend of Ronald Knox and Evelyn Waugh and in 1924 converted to Roman Catholicism, as Knox had already done and as Waugh did later.

For ten years from 1925 he taught history at Stonyhurst College, then from 1935 to 1939 was a visiting professor of the University of Notre Dame, Indiana, where he carried out economic research.

At the beginning of the Second World War, Hollis returned home and served throughout the war as a Royal Air Force intelligence officer.

Immediately after the war, he was elected as Member of Parliament for Devizes in Wiltshire and held the seat until he retired undefeated in 1955. While in the House of Commons, he showed an independent spirit, for example by supporting the abolition of capital punishment while that was not his party's general view, and was popular on all sides. When he left the Commons (to be succeeded by another Conservative, Percivall Pott) he became a parliamentary commentator for Punch and retired to Mells, near Frome in Somerset, where he spent his time in writing books and journalism and in supporting Somerset County Cricket Club and other local interests. He was also a member of the publishing firm Hollis and Carter, a subsidiary of Burns and Oates. In 1957, he briefly revisited Australia, in association with the Congress for Cultural Freedom.

Hollis wrote books and articles on a variety of historical and political subjects. His last book, Oxford in the Twenties (1976) is about his wide circle of friends, including Evelyn Waugh, Maurice Bowra, Harold Acton, Leslie Hore-Belisha, and the cricketer R. C. Robertson-Glasgow.

== Family ==
In 1929, Hollis married Madeleine King, daughter of the Rev. Richard King, Rector of Cholderton, and herself also a Roman Catholic convert, and they had one daughter and three sons, including Crispian Hollis, Bishop of Portsmouth.

He was the brother of Sir Roger Hollis, sometime Director General of MI5, and the uncle of the academic Adrian Hollis.

== Publications ==
- Glastonbury and England (1927)
- Dr Johnson (1928)
- The Monstrous Regiment (1929)
- The American Heresy (1930)
- Saint Ignatius (1931)
- The Breakdown of Money: An Historical Explanation (1934)
- Sir Thomas More (1934)
- The Two Nations: A Financial Study of English History (1935)
- Our Case: What We Are Fighting For - and Why (1939)
- Death of a Gentleman: The Letters of Robert Fossett (1943)
- History of Britain in Modern Times, 1688-1939 (The Ashley Histories) (1946)
- The Rise and Fall of the Ex-Socialist Government (1947)
- Can Parliament Survive? (1949)
- G. K. Chesterton (Writers and Their Work) (1950)
- Evelyn Waugh (Writers and Their Work) (1954)
- A Study of George Orwell: The Man and His Works (1956)
- The Ayes and the Noes (1957)
- Eton: A History (1960)
- The Church and Economics (Faith and Fact Books) (1961)
- The Homicide Act (1964)
- The Papacy: An Illustrated History from St Peter to Paul VI (1964)
- The Oxford Union (1965)
- The Achievements of Vatican II (Knowledge and Faith) (1967)
- Newman and the Modern World (1968)
- The Jesuits: A History (1968)
- The Mind of Chesterton (1969)
- Holy Places: Jewish, Christian and Muslim Monuments in the Holy Land (1969)
- Parliament and its Sovereignty (1973)
- The Seven Ages: Their Exits and Their Entrances (1974)
- Oxford in the Twenties (1976)

Parliament of the United Kingdom
Preceded by Percy Hurd	Member of Parliament for Devizes; 1945 – 1955	Succeeded by Percivall Pott
