= 1927 Westbury by-election =

Election in the UK

The 1927 Westbury by-election was a by-election held on 16 June 1927 for the British House of Commons constituency of Westbury.

== Vacancy ==
The Unionist MP, Walter William Shaw died on 10 May 1927 at the age of 58. He had been MP here since the last General election, when he gained the seat from the Liberal;

General election 1924 Electorate 30,784
Party	Candidate	Votes	%	±%
Unionist	Walter William Shaw	11,559	44.2	+4.8
Liberal	Charles Darbishire	9,848	37.7	−5.5
Labour	George Ward	4,731	18.1	+0.7
Majority		1,711	6.5	N/A
Turnout		26,138	84.9	+1.4
Unionist gain from Liberal		Swing		

== History ==
In the 13 elections since the constituency was created in 1885, the Unionists had won only three times to the Liberals ten times. The Labour Party first contested the seat in 1918 and then at every election since. In every one of the four elections since 1918, the winner was elected with a minority of the vote, with Labour finishing third every time. So the constituency could be described as a Unionist/Liberal marginal.

== Candidates ==
The Unionists chose Maj. Eric Long to defend the seat. He was the 35-year-old son of former Unionist leader Walter Long. The previous Liberal MP, Charles Darbishire who was the Liberal candidate last time, had died in 1925. The local Liberals had not got around to selecting a replacement until the by-election occurred. They settled on 34-year-old Harcourt Johnstone, a former Liberal MP for Willesden East who had been defeated at the last General Election. Johnstone was related to former Liberal leader William Harcourt. Johnstone first tried to re-enter parliament at the 1925 Eastbourne by-election but finished second in this safe Unionist seat. The Labour candidate was George Ward, who had contested the seat at the previous three elections, never polling more than a fifth of the vote. He was a local Justice of the Peace and worked as a railway signalman.

== Result ==
The Unionists held the seat with a narrow majority.

Westbury by-election, 1927 Electorate 31,321
Party	Candidate	Votes	%	±%
Unionist	Richard Long	10,623	40.1	−4.1
Liberal	Harcourt Johnstone	10,474	39.5	+1.8
Labour	George Ward	5,396	20.4	+2.3
Majority		149	0.6	−5.9
Turnout		26,493	84.6	−0.3
Unionist hold		Swing		

== Aftermath ==
All three candidates again faced each other at the following General Election, with a similar result;

General election 1929 Electorate 38,119
Party	Candidate	Votes	%	±%
Unionist	Richard Long	12,907	38.8	−1.3
Liberal	Harcourt Johnstone	12,840	38.7	−0.8
Labour	George Ward	7,458	22.5	+2.1
Majority		67	0.1	−0.5
Turnout		33,205	87.1	+2.5
Unionist hold		Swing	-0.3	

Johnstone was eventually to return to the house in 1931 as Liberal MP for South Shields.
