= Walter Long, 2nd Viscount Long =

British peer (1911-1944)

The Right Honourable The Viscount Long

Personal details
- Born: Walter Francis David Long; 14 September 1911
- Died: 23 September 1944 (aged 33) Uden, German-occupied Netherlands
- Cause of death: Killed in action
- Spouse: Frances Laura Charteris (m. 1933; div. 1942)
- Children: Antoinette Frances Sibell Long
- Parents: Walter Long (father); Sibell Vanden Bempde-Johnstone (mother)
- Relatives: Walter Long, 1st Viscount Long (grandfather); Richard Long, 3rd Viscount Long (uncle)
- Education: Eton College
- Military career
- Allegiance: United Kingdom
- Branch: British Army
- Rank: Major
- Unit: Coldstream Guards
- Conflicts: World War II

Walter Francis David Long, 2nd Viscount Long (14 September 1911 – 23 September 1944), was a British peer and soldier.

== Early life ==
The eldest son of Brigadier-General Walter Long (d. 1917) and Sibell Vanden Bempde-Johnstone, granddaughter of Baron Derwent.

Long was educated at St David's School, Reigate, and later at Eton on the insistence of his mother, who had remarried in 1921 to Lord Glyn. Traditionally the Longs were educated at Harrow. After his father's death in 1917, there was tension between his grandfather, Walter Long, 1st Viscount Long and his mother, who refused to allow her son to spend any of his school holidays with him at Rood Ashton House. Lord Long was afraid that she had not instilled any affection for Rood Ashton in his grandson, and he consequently believed he might eventually sell the estate, which had been in the family for hundreds of years.

== Military career ==
Long's father had been killed in action in 1917, during World War I and so on the demise of his grandfather in 1924, Long aged just 13, inherited the latter's title. During the Second World War, Lord Long fought as a Major with the Coldstream Guards and he himself was killed in action at Uden, Netherlands in 1944. Having no sons, he was succeeded by his uncle, Richard. Long is buried at the Uden War Cemetery.

== Personal life ==
On 14 November 1933, Long married (Frances) Laura Charteris (sister of novelist Hugo Charteris and granddaughter of Hugo Charteris, 11th Earl of Wemyss). In 1933, directly after his marriage, Long and his new wife travelled to New Zealand to take up an appointment as Aide de Camp to Lord Bledisloe. They had one daughter:

- The Honourable Antoinette Frances Sibell Long (b. 1934), who married Charles Morrison (1932–2005), second son of the 1st Baron Margadale.

Long and his wife divorced in 1942. The former Lady Long subsequently married three more times, in 1943 to the 3rd Earl of Dudley, in 1960 to Michael Temple Canfield, and lastly in 1972 to the 10th Duke of Marlborough.

Peerage of the United Kingdom
Preceded by Walter Hume Long	Viscount Long; 1924–1944	Succeeded by Richard Eric Onslow Long
