= Walter Shaw (British politician) =

British politician (1868–1927)

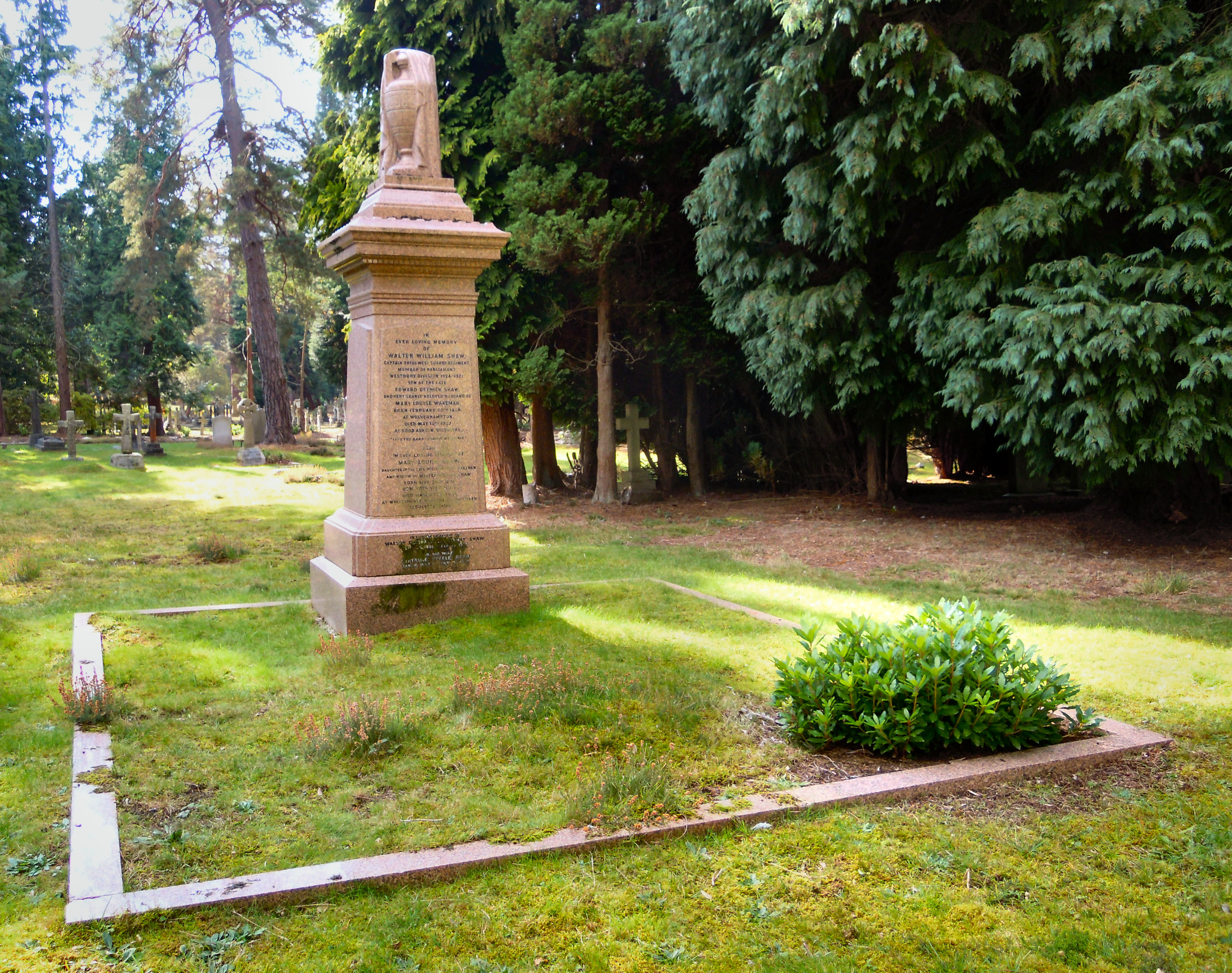
The grave of Walter William Shaw in Brookwood Cemetery

Walter William Shaw (20 February 1868 – 10 May 1927) was a British Conservative Party politician.

Shaw was born in Wolverhampton and educated at Mill Hill School and Jesus College, Cambridge. He seemingly did not graduate but instead joined the North Staffordshire Regiment as a second lieutenant in 1889, serving in World War I as a Captain in the 3rd Queens Regiment.

He was elected at the 1924 general election as Member of Parliament (MP) for Westbury in Wiltshire, having unsuccessfully fought the seat in 1923. He had previously contested Houghton-le-Spring at the 1922 general election. However, he did not complete a full Parliament, dying in office in May 1927, aged 58. He is buried in Brookwood Cemetery.

Parliament of the United Kingdom
Preceded by Charles Darbishire	Member of Parliament for Westbury; 1924 – 1927	Succeeded by Richard Long
