= Mary Constance Wyndham =

British socialite (1862–1937)

The Right Honourable The Countess of Wemyss and March
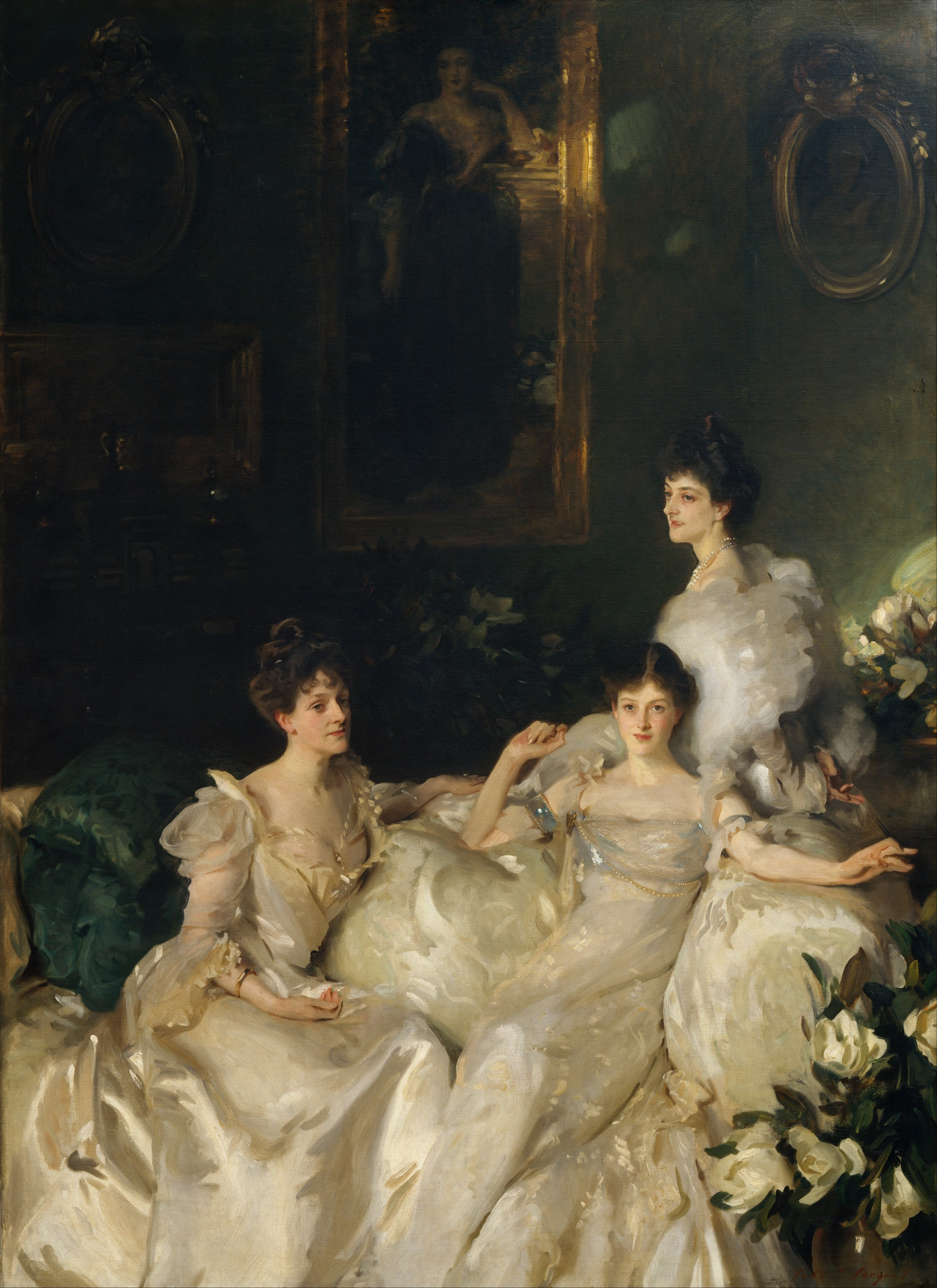
- The Wyndham Sisters (1899)

Personal details
- Born: Mary Constance Wyndham; 3 August 1862 Belgrave Square, London, England
- Died: 30 April 1937 (aged 74)
- Spouse: Hugo Charteris, 11th Earl of Wemyss, 7th Earl of March (m. 1883)
- Children: 7
- Parent(s): Percy Wyndham; Madeline Campbell

Mary Constance Charteris, Countess of Wemyss and March (née Wyndham; 3 August 1862 – 29 April 1937), styled Lady Elcho from 1883 to 1914, was an English society hostess and an original member of The Souls, an exclusive social and intellectual group.

== Early life and ancestry ==
Mary Constance Wyndham was born on 3 August 1862 in London at her parents' home in Belgrave Square. She was the eldest daughter of Percy Wyndham and Madeline Caroline Frances Eden Campbell. Her paternal grandfather was George Wyndham, 1st Baron Leconfield. Her maternal grandfather was Sir Guy Campbell, 1st Baronet.

She was a great-granddaughter of Irish revolutionary Lord Edward FitzGerald, the son of James FitzGerald, 1st Duke of Leinster. Her great-great-grandmother, Emily FitzGerald, Duchess of Leinster, was one of the Lennox sisters and a daughter of Charles Lennox, 2nd Duke of Richmond.

Her brothers were George Wyndham and Guy Wyndham. She had two younger sisters: Madeline, the wife of Charles Adeane, and Pamela, first the wife of Edward Tennant, 1st Baron Glenconner, and later the wife of Edward Grey, 1st Viscount Grey of Fallodon.

== Society life ==
Wyndham and her siblings and their spouses were members of The Souls, an elite English social group. She and her two sisters were the subjects of John Singer Sargent's 1899 painting The Wyndham Sisters: Lady Elcho, Mrs. Adeane, and Mrs. Tennant. Her life was detailed in the book Those Wild Wyndhams by Claudia Renton.

== Marriage and issue ==
Wyndham and Hugo Charteris, Lord Elcho, who would later inherit the titles of 11th Earl of Wemyss and 7th Earl of March, were married on 9 August 1883. They had seven children:

- Hugo Francis Richard "Ego" Charteris, Lord Elcho (b. 28 Dec 1884, d. 23 Apr 1916), who married Lady Violet Catherine Manners. Killed in action in WWI.
- Captain Hon. Guy Lawrence Charteris (b. 23 May 1886, d. 21 Sep 1967), who married Frances Tennant, granddaughter of Sir Charles Tennant, 1st Baronet, whose sister was Kathleen Manners, Duchess of Rutland. Together they had, among others, Ann Fleming, Laura Spencer-Churchill, Duchess of Marlborough and Hugo Charteris.
- Lady Cynthia Mary Evelyn Charteris (b. 27 Sep 1887, d. 31 Mar 1960), married the Hon. Herbert Asquith, second son of the Prime Minister H. H. Asquith.
- Hon. Colin Charteris (b. 1 Jun 1889, d. 27 Dec 1892).
- Lady Mary Pamela Madeline Sibell Charteris (b. 24 Oct 1895, d. 1991), whose real father was the poet Wilfrid Scawen Blunt. Married, firstly, in 1916 Algernon Walter Strickland and, secondly, in 1943 Maj. John Lyon.
- Hon. Yvo Alan Charteris (b. 6 Oct 1896, d. 17 Oct 1915), Hugo's favourite child according to Mary Elcho. Killed in action in WWI.
- Lady Irene Corona Charteris (b. 31 May 1902, d. 1989); she was born within days after her cousin David Pax Tennant, the son of her mother's sister, Pamela Tennant. Reportedly, both were named after the peace their mothers hoped would prevail upon Britain after the Boer War, as "Irene" and "Pax" are the Greek and Latin words for peace respectively. Her middle name, Corona, referred to the Coronation of Edward VII and Alexandra which took place a few months after she was born. She married another scion of The Souls, Ivor Windsor-Clive, 2nd Earl of Plymouth, whose mother, Alberta "Gay" Plymouth, was carrying on a years-long affair with Irene's uncle, George Wyndham.

== Death ==
She died on 29 April 1937.
