= Percivall Pott (politician) =

British politician

Henry Percivall Pott (29 March 1908 – 17 January 1964) was a British farmer, company director and politician. He concentrated in his political career on agricultural issues, and was a fairly low-profile backbench Member of Parliament for nine years.

== Entry to farming ==
Pott was descended from Percivall Pott, a pioneering surgeon of the 18th century. His father retired as a London stockbroker to live at Upham. After education at Oundle School, Henry Percivall began working on a farm in Northamptonshire. He was at one time Farm Manager to Prince Henry, Duke of Gloucester, at Barnwell. In 1936 Pott was elected to the Northamptonshire County Executive Committee of the National Farmers Union. He specialised in farming poultry and in 1938 he was chosen as part of a delegation from the National Poultry Council to the Danish National Agricultural Exhibition.

== Wartime ==
During the Second World War, Pott served in the Royal Air Force Volunteer Reserve from 1941, and achieved the rank of Squadron Leader. In 1946, after he was discharged from the RAFVR, Pott married Mary Larkworthy, who had also been a member of the National Poultry Council delegation eight years before. He moved to Hampshire where he was on the Hampshire County Executive of the NFU from 1947 to 1952. He was also on the Estate Management Committee of the Hampshire Agricultural Executive Committee from 1948 to 1953.

== Politics ==
Meanwhile, Pott became involved in politics as a member of the Conservative Party. He was elected to Hampshire County Council in 1949, and became a Justice of the Peace in 1951. His business involvement also extended to two Water companies: he was a Director of the Mid-Wessex Water Company and became Chairman of Wey Valley Water Company.

In 1955, Christopher Hollis announced his retirement as Member of Parliament for Devizes, and Pott was selected to follow him as Conservative candidate. An analysis of the election prospects in The Times noted that the seat had a Conservative majority of only 1,577 and that Labour prospects were helped by the building of overspill housing from Swindon. The Labour candidate was also a farmer. However, Pott held the seat for the Conservatives and increased the majority to 2,075.

== Parliament ==
As many expected, Pott concentrated on agriculture issues in the House of Commons. He spoke rarely, and remained loyal to the Conservative Party, casting no dissenting votes against the Conservative whip. In December 1957, he welcomed the Local Government Bill and observed that if local authorities had to look to Whitehall for sanction for their actions, then no-one of any calibre would get involved in local government. He also signed a motion opposing the "Suez Group" which supported the development of an economic and politically based organisation behind NATO.

At the 1959 general election Pott faced down a renewed Labour onslaught which tried to gain the seat. He increased the majority to 3,838, with the help of an unofficial Liberal candidate intervening. In May 1960 he tried to stop Esso building an oil pipeline between its refinery at Fawley and London Heathrow Airport.

== Death ==
His Parliamentary activity was reduced by illness, although he did speak in support of the Conservative candidate in the Chippenham by-election in 1962. In 1963 Pott announced that he would not fight the next election, but in the end he was found dead in bed at his London flat in January 1964 before Parliament had been dissolved.

Parliament of the United Kingdom
Preceded by Christopher Hollis	Member of Parliament for Devizes; 1955–1964	Succeeded by Charles Morrison
