= Herbert Asquith (poet) =

English poet, novelist, and lawyer (1881–1947)

The Honourable Herbert Asquith
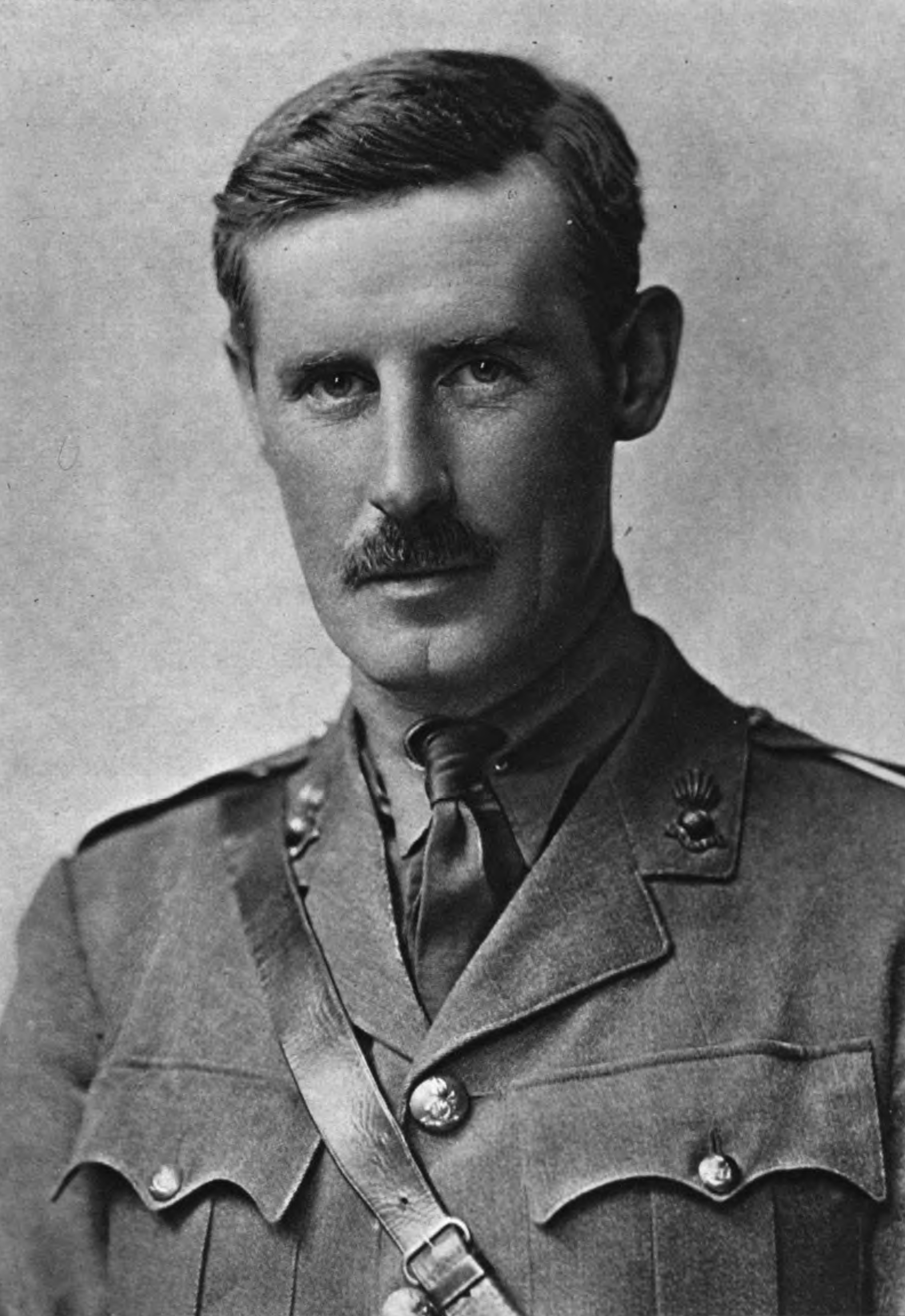
- 1918 photograph of Asquith
- Born: 11 March 1881; Hampstead, London, England
- Died: 5 August 1947 (aged 66); Bath, Somerset, England
- Occupations: Lawyer and writer
- Spouse: Lady Cynthia Charteris (m. 1910)
- Children: 3
- Parents: H. H. Asquith (father); Helen Melland (mother)

Herbert Dixon Asquith (11 March 1881 – 5 August 1947) was an English poet, novelist, and lawyer. Nicknamed "Beb" by his family, he was the second son of H. H. Asquith, British Prime Minister and the younger brother of Raymond Asquith.

Asquith was educated at Winchester College and Balliol College, Oxford, serving as President of the Oxford Union (as his father and brother had done) in 1903. He was called to the bar in 1907.

He was greatly affected by his service with the Royal Artillery in World War I. His poems included "The Volunteer" and "The Fallen Subaltern", the latter being a tribute to fallen soldiers. His poem "Soldiers at Peace" was set to music by Ina Boyle. His novels include the best-selling Young Orland (set during and after the First World War), Wind's End, Mary Dallon, and Roon.

In 1910, he married Lady Cynthia Charteris, who was also a writer. She was the eldest daughter of Hugo Charteris, 11th Earl of Wemyss, and his wife, Mary Constance Wyndham. They had three sons.

== Bibliography ==
- 1938 - Moments Of Memory. Recollections And Impressions
