= Prince George, Duke of Kent =

British prince (1902–1942)

Prince George
- Duke of Kent (more)
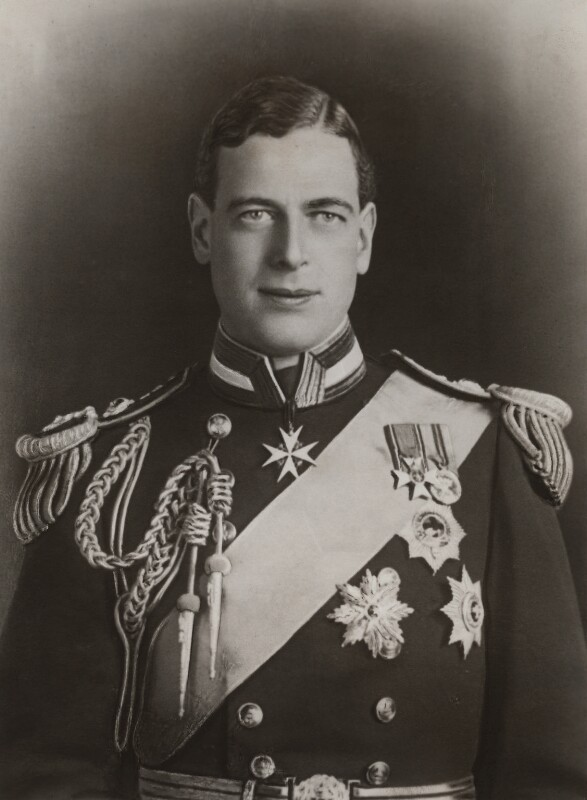
- George in 1934
- Born: Prince George of Wales; 20 December 1902; York Cottage, Sandringham, Norfolk, England
- Died: 25 August 1942 (aged 39); Morven, Caithness, Scotland
- Cause of death: Dunbeath air crash
- Burial: 29 August 1942; Royal Vault, St George's Chapel, Windsor Castle; 29 August 1968; Royal Burial Ground, Frogmore
- Spouse: Princess Marina of Greece and Denmark (m. 1934)
- Issue: Prince Edward, Duke of Kent; Princess Alexandra, The Hon. Lady Ogilvy; Prince Michael of Kent
Names
- George Edward Alexander Edmund
- House: Windsor (from 1917); Saxe-Coburg and Gotha (until 1917)
- Father: George V
- Mother: Mary of Teck
- Education: Royal Naval College, Osborne; Britannia Royal Naval College
- Military career
- Allegiance: United Kingdom
- Branch: Royal Navy; British Army; Royal Air Force
- Years of active service: 1916–1942
- Rank: Rear-Admiral (RN); Major-General (British Army); Air Commodore (RAF)
- Conflicts: First World War; Second World War

Prince George, Duke of Kent (George Edward Alexander Edmund; 20 December 1902 – 25 August 1942), was a member of the British royal family, the fourth son of King George V and Queen Mary, and a younger brother of Kings Edward VIII and George VI. He served in the Royal Navy during the 1920s before briefly working as a civil servant, and in 1934, he was created Duke of Kent. That same year, he married Princess Marina of Greece and Denmark, with whom he had three children: Edward, Alexandra and Michael.

In the late 1930s, he joined the Royal Air Force, holding staff appointments at RAF Training Command and, from 1941, in the Welfare Section of the Inspector-General's Staff. George was killed in an air crash in Scotland in 1942, aged 39.

== Early life ==
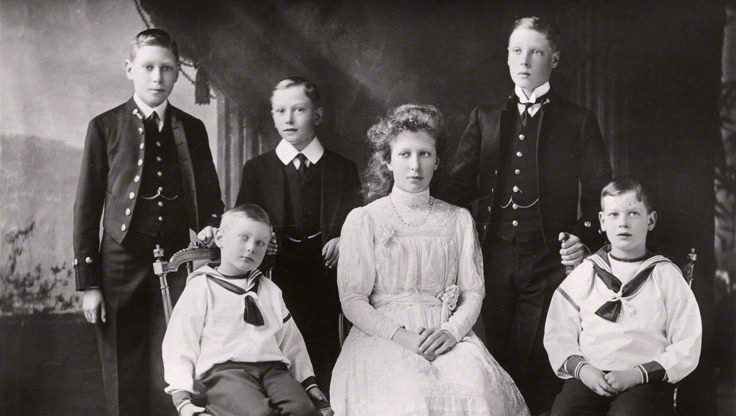
George (far right) with his siblings in 1910

George was born at 7:35 pm on 20 December 1902 at York Cottage on the Sandringham Estate in Norfolk, England. His father was the Prince of Wales (later King George V), the only surviving son of King Edward VII and Queen Alexandra. His mother was the Princess of Wales, later Queen Mary, the eldest child and only daughter of the Duke and Duchess of Teck. At the time of his birth, George was fifth in the line of succession to the throne, following his father and three older brothers: Edward (later Edward VIII), Albert (later George VI), and Henry.

He was baptised in the Private Chapel at Windsor Castle on 26 January 1903 by Francis Paget, the Bishop of Oxford. His godparents were King Edward VII (his paternal grandfather); Prince Valdemar of Denmark (his paternal granduncle, represented by Prince Carl of Denmark, his paternal uncle and first cousin once removed); Prince Louis of Battenberg (husband of his father's cousin); Queen Alexandra (his paternal grandmother); Empress Dowager Maria Feodorovna (his paternal grandaunt, represented by Princess Victoria of the United Kingdom, his paternal aunt); and Princess Christian of Schleswig-Holstein (his paternal grandaunt).

== Education and career ==
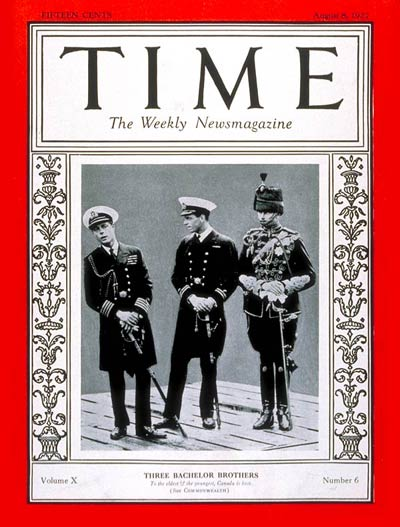
George (centre) with his brothers the Prince of Wales and Prince Henry on Time magazine's cover, 8 August 1927

George received his early education from a tutor and later followed his brother Henry to St Peter's Court, a preparatory school at Broadstairs, Kent. At the age of 13, like his elder brothers, Edward and Albert, he entered naval college, first at Osborne and subsequently at Dartmouth. He was promoted to sub-lieutenant on 15 February 1924 and to lieutenant on 15 February 1926. He remained on active service in the Royal Navy until March 1929, serving on HMS Iron Duke and later on the flagship of the Atlantic Fleet (renamed the Home Fleet in 1932), HMS Nelson. He served on the latter as a lieutenant on the admiral's staff before transferring in 1928 to HMS Durban on the America and West Indies Station, based at the Royal Naval Dockyard in Bermuda. His father had previously served at Bermuda on HMS Canada and HMS Thrush as a watch-keeping lieutenant.

After leaving the navy, he briefly held posts at the Foreign Office and later the Home Office, becoming the first member of the royal family to work as a civil servant. He continued to receive promotions after leaving active service, being advanced to commander on 15 February 1934 and to captain on 1 January 1937.

From January to April 1931, George and Edward undertook an 18,000‑mile tour of South America. Their outward voyage was on the ocean liner Oropesa. In Buenos Aires they opened a British Empire Exhibition. They continued from the Río de la Plata to Rio de Janeiro on the liner Alcantara and returned from Brazil to Europe on the liner Arlanza, landing at Lisbon. They travelled back via Paris and an Imperial Airways flight from Paris–Le Bourget Airport that landed specially in Windsor Great Park.

On 23 June 1936, he was appointed a personal aide-de-camp to his eldest brother, the new king, Edward VIII. Following Edward's abdication, George was appointed a personal naval aide-de-camp to his other elder brother, now George VI. On 12 March 1937, he was commissioned as a colonel in the British Army and as a group captain in the Royal Air Force (RAF). He was also appointed Colonel-in-Chief of the Royal Fusiliers from the same date.

In October 1938, George was appointed Governor-General of Australia in succession to Lord Gowrie, with effect from November 1939. On 11 September 1939, however, it was announced that, owing to the outbreak of the Second World War, the appointment would be postponed.

On 8 June 1939, he was promoted to rear admiral in the Royal Navy, major-general in the British Army, and air vice-marshal in the Royal Air Force. At the start of the Second World War, he returned to active naval service with the rank of rear admiral, serving briefly in the Intelligence Division of the Admiralty.

He was patron of the Society for Nautical Research between 1926 and 1942.

== Personal life ==
=== Marriage and children ===
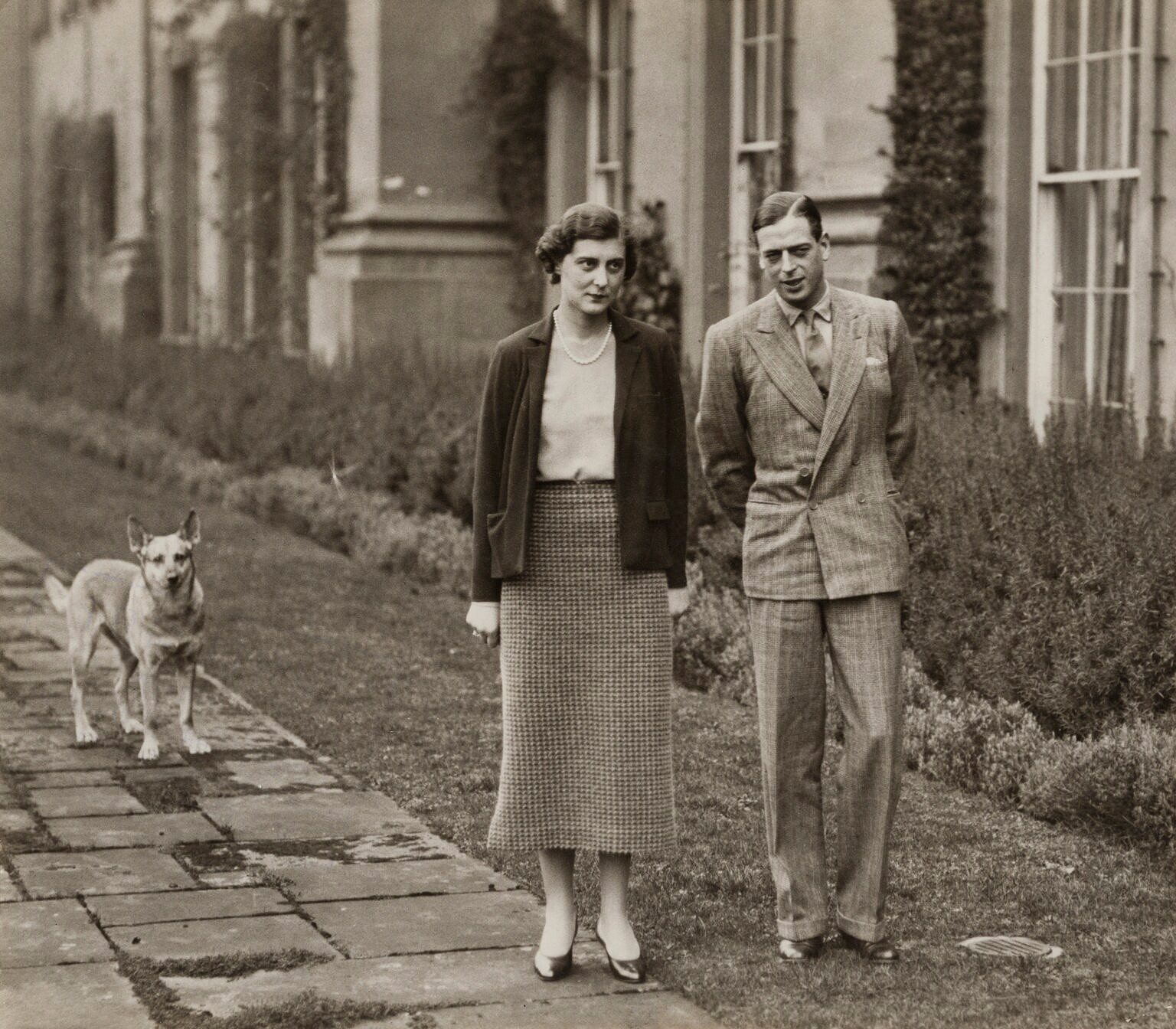
George and Marina in 1934

On 9 October 1934, in anticipation of his forthcoming marriage to his second cousin, Princess Marina of Greece and Denmark, George was created Duke of Kent, Earl of St Andrews, and Baron Downpatrick. The couple married on 29 November at Westminster Abbey. This was followed by a Greek ceremony in the private chapel at Buckingham Palace, which was converted into an Orthodox chapel for the liturgy. They had three children:

- Prince Edward, Duke of Kent (born 9 October 1935). He married Katharine Worsley on 8 June 1961. They had three children.
- Princess Alexandra, The Hon. Lady Ogilvy (born 25 December 1936). She married the Hon. Angus Ogilvy, son of David Ogilvy, 12th Earl of Airlie, and Lady Alexandra Coke, on 24 April 1963. They had two children.
- Prince Michael of Kent (born 4 July 1942). He married Baroness Marie Christine von Reibnitz on 30 June 1978. They have two children.

The couple lived at 3 Belgrave Square following their marriage, and it was there that their two elder children were born. George also inherited Coppins from Princess Victoria.

=== Relationships ===
George was rumoured to have had affairs with the musical star Jessie Matthews, the writer Cecil Roberts, and Noël Coward, a suggestion which Coward's long-term partner Graham Payn, denied. During his marriage, he was also said to have had an affair with the socialite Margaret Whigham, later Margaret Campbell, Duchess of Argyll, although there is no firm evidence for this claim.

His first significant relationship was with Gladys Jean Combe, younger daughter of Captain Christian Combe of the Royal Horse Guards and Lady Jane Combe, daughter of George Conyngham, 3rd Marquess Conyngham. George met her while serving as a sub-lieutenant on HMS Mackay during one of his trips ashore.

He was also alleged to have struggled with drug addiction, particularly to morphine and cocaine, an allegation said to have arisen from his association with Kiki Preston (née Alice Gwynne, 1898–1946), whom he first met in the mid-1920s. Known as "the girl with the silver syringe" because of her heroin addiction, Preston – a cousin of the heiress Gloria Vanderbilt – was married first to Horace R. B. Allen and later, in 1925, to the banker Jerome Preston. She died in 1946 after jumping from a window of the Stanhope Hotel in New York City.

George was also linked to a ménage à trois involving Preston and José Uriburu, the bisexual son of the Argentine ambassador to the United Kingdom, José Uriburu Tezanos. He was further said to have fathered a son with Preston. According to the memoirs of Loelia, Duchess of Westminster, Edward VIII believed that the child was Michael Temple Canfield (1926–1969), the adopted son of the American publisher Cass Canfield and the first husband of Lee Radziwill, sister of Jacqueline Kennedy Onassis.

After being sent by the King to the Far East, George began a relationship in Singapore in 1926 with Leila Devitt, a hostess and wife of a commodities magnate who was 10 years his senior. He was also associated with several other women during his life, including Poppy Baring (whom the King and Queen considered unsuitable as a royal bride), Lois Sturt, Paula Gellibrand, Audrey Coats, Edythe d'Erlanger, Myrtle Farquharson, Florence Mills, and Adelaide Hall.

== RAF career ==
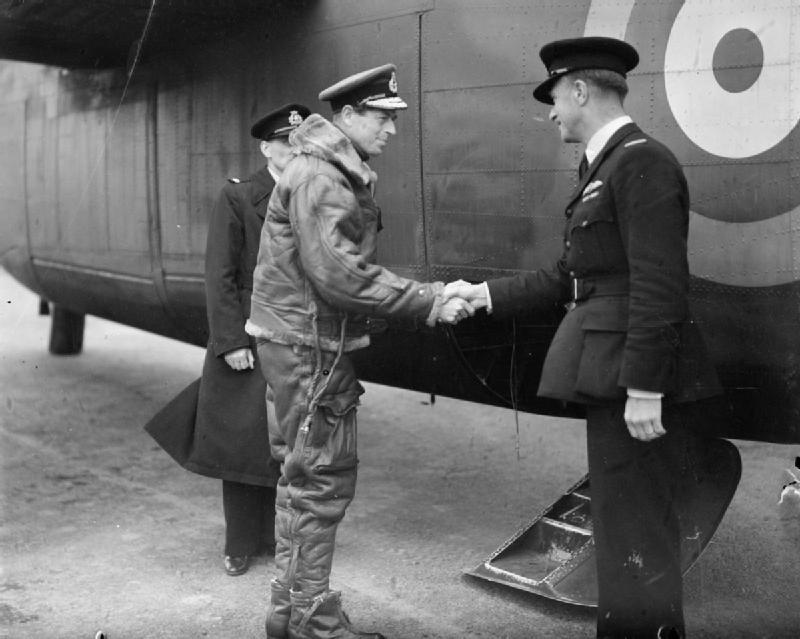
George before he crossed the Atlantic by air

As a young man, George became convinced that the future lay in aviation. It quickly became his chief enthusiasm, and in 1929 he earned his pilot's licence. He was the first member of the royal family to cross the Atlantic Ocean by air. Before his flying career, he had entered the Royal Navy and received intelligence training while stationed at Rosyth.

In March 1937, he was granted a commission in the Royal Air Force as a group captain. He was appointed Honorary Air Commodore of No. 500 (County of Kent) Squadron, Auxiliary Air Force, in August 1938. He was promoted to air vice-marshal in June 1939, alongside corresponding promotions to flag and general officer rank in the Royal Navy and British Army.

In 1939, he returned to active service as a rear admiral in the Royal Navy, but in April 1940 transferred to the Royal Air Force. He temporarily relinquished his air-officer rank to serve as a staff officer at RAF Training Command in the rank of group captain, ensuring he would not be senior to more experienced officers. On 28 July 1941, he assumed the rank of air commodore in the Welfare Section of the RAF Inspector General's Staff. In this role, he undertook official visits to RAF stations to support wartime morale.

== Freemasonry ==
George was initiated into freemasonry on 12 April 1928 in Navy Lodge No. 2612. He served as master of Navy Lodge in 1931, and was also a member of Prince of Wales's Lodge No. 259 and Royal Alpha Lodge No. 16, of which he became master in 1940. He was appointed senior grand warden of the United Grand Lodge of England in 1933, and served as provincial grand master from 1934 until he was elected grand master of the United Grand Lodge of England in 1939, a position he held until his death in 1942.

== Death ==
On 25 August 1942, George and 14 others took off in RAF Short Sunderland flying boat W4026 from Invergordon, Ross and Cromarty, for a non‑operational flight to Iceland. The aircraft crashed on Eagle's Rock, a hillside near Dunbeath, Caithness, Scotland. George and all but one of those on board were killed. He was 39 years old.

George's body was interred initially in the Royal Vault of St George's Chapel, Windsor; in 1968 he was reburied in the Royal Burial Ground, Frogmore, directly behind Queen Victoria's mausoleum. His elder son, six-year-old Edward, succeeded him as Duke of Kent. Marina, his wife, had given birth to their third child, Michael, only seven weeks before George's death. His will was sealed in Llandudno in 1943, and his estate was valued at £157,735 (£8.8 million in 2024).

One RAF crew member survived the crash: Flight Sergeant Andrew Jack, the Sunderland's rear gunner. Jack's niece has claimed that he told his brother that George had been at the controls of the aircraft, that Jack had dragged him from the pilot's seat after the crash, and that there was an additional person on board whose identity has never been revealed.

== In popular culture ==
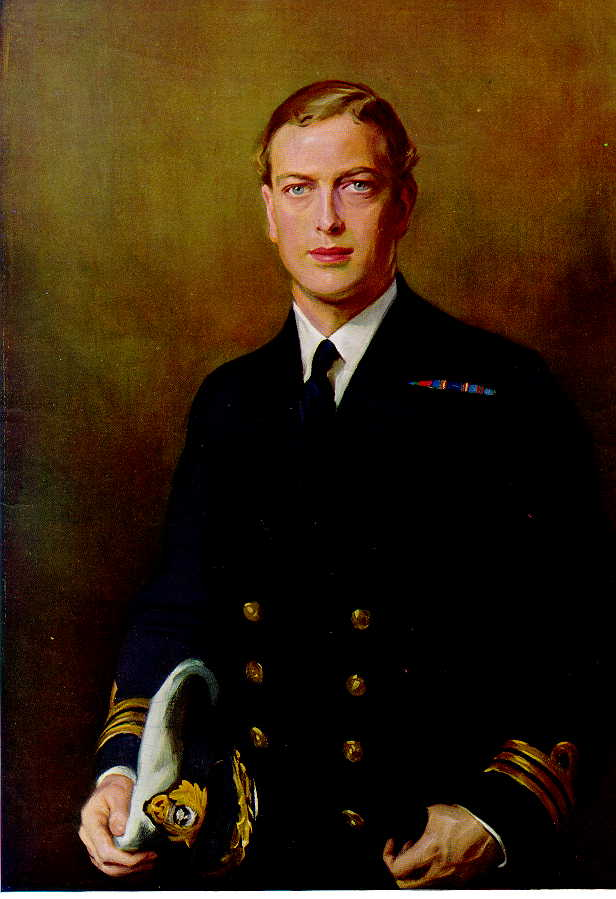
Portrait by Philip de László, 1934

George's early life is dramatised in Stephen Poliakoff's television serial The Lost Prince (2003), a biography of his younger brother John. In the production, the teenage Prince 'Georgie' is portrayed as sensitive, intelligent, artistic, and unusually sympathetic to John's difficulties. He is shown as detesting his time at the Royal Naval College and as having a strained relationship with his austere father.

In May 2008, the BBC aired the Radio 4 comedy Hut 33, Series 2, Episode 1, titled "The Royal Visit". The main guest character in the episode is the Duke of Kent, played by Michael Fenton-Stevens. Set at Bletchley Park, the programme depicts a team of codebreakers instructed to conceal the nature of their work during an impromptu royal visit. Within the episode's comic narrative, the Duke is described as a Nazi spy and is portrayed as promiscuous and bisexual, attempting to obtain sexual favours from a male member of staff, while a female character recalls a previous liaison with him.

Much of George's later life was outlined in the documentary film The Queen's Lost Uncle. He also appears as a recurring character in the revival of Upstairs, Downstairs (2010–2012), portrayed by Blake Ritson. In the series, he is depicted as a caring brother, anxious about the direction taken by his family, later as an appeaser of the German regime, and as a supportive friend of Hallam Holland.

George and his eldest brother, the Prince of Wales (later Edward VIII), appear in Poliakoff's BBC serial Dancing on the Edge (2013), in which they are shown as supporters of jazz and encouragers of Louis Lester's Jazz Band. A sexual attraction to Lester on George's part is also suggested.

== Honours and arms ==
Country	Date	Appointment	Ribbon	Post-nominal letters	Other
United Kingdom	1923	Royal Knight Companion of Order of the Garter		KG	formally invested in 1924
United Kingdom	1935	Extra Knight of the Order of the Thistle		KT	
United Kingdom	1934	Knight Grand Cross of the Order of St Michael and St George		GCMG	
United Kingdom	1924	Knight Grand Cross of the Royal Victorian Order		GCVO	
United Kingdom	1936	Recipient of the Royal Victorian Chain			
United Kingdom	23 June 1936	Personal aide-de-camp		ADC	
Denmark	20 September 1922	Knight of the Order of the Elephant			
Norway	20 December 1924	Grand Cross with Collar of the Order of St. Olav			
Sweden	1 October 1932	Knight of the Order of the Seraphim			
Chile		Knight Grand Cross of the Chilean Order of Merit			
France	March 1939	Grand Cross of the Legion of Honour			

=== Appointments ===
==== Military ====
Canada

- (Canada) Colonel-in-Chief, The Essex and Kent Scottish (1937 – 1942)

New Zealand

- Colonel-in-Chief, Corps of New Zealand Engineers (1938)

United Kingdom

- (United Kingdom) Colonel-in-Chief, Queen's Own Royal West Kent Regiment (1935)
- (United Kingdom) Colonel-in-Chief, Royal Fusiliers (1937)
- (United Kingdom) Honorary Air Commodore, No. 500 (County of Kent) Squadron Auxiliary Air Force (1938)

==== Civic ====
- 1938–42: Grand Master of the Guild of Air Pilots and Air Navigators

=== Arms ===
Around the time of his elder brother Prince Henry's twenty-first birthday, Prince George was granted the use of the Royal Arms, differenced by a label argent of three points, each bearing an anchor azure.

Prince George's coat of arms

George's banner of arms

George's personal banner of arms in Scotland

== Ancestry ==
Ancestors of Prince George, Duke of Kent

8. Prince Albert of Saxe-Coburg and Gotha
4. Edward VII of the United Kingdom
9. Victoria of the United Kingdom
2. George V of the United Kingdom
10. Christian IX, King of Denmark
5. Princess Alexandra of Denmark
11. Princess Louise of Hesse-Kassel
1. Prince George, Duke of Kent
12. Duke Alexander of Württemberg
6. Francis, Duke of Teck
13. Countess Claudine Rhédey von Kis-Rhéde
3. Princess Victoria Mary of Teck
14. Prince Adolphus, Duke of Cambridge
7. Princess Mary Adelaide of Cambridge
15. Princess Augusta of Hesse-Kassel

Prince George, Duke of Kent House of Windsor Cadet branch of the House of Wettin Born: 20 December 1902 Died: 25 August 1942
Masonic offices
Preceded by The Duke of Connaught and Strathearn	Grand Master of the United Grand Lodge of England; 1939–1942	Succeeded by The Earl of Harewood
Peerage of the United Kingdom
New title	Duke of Kent; 1934–1942	Succeeded by Prince Edward
