= Kiki Preston =

American socialite (1898–1946)

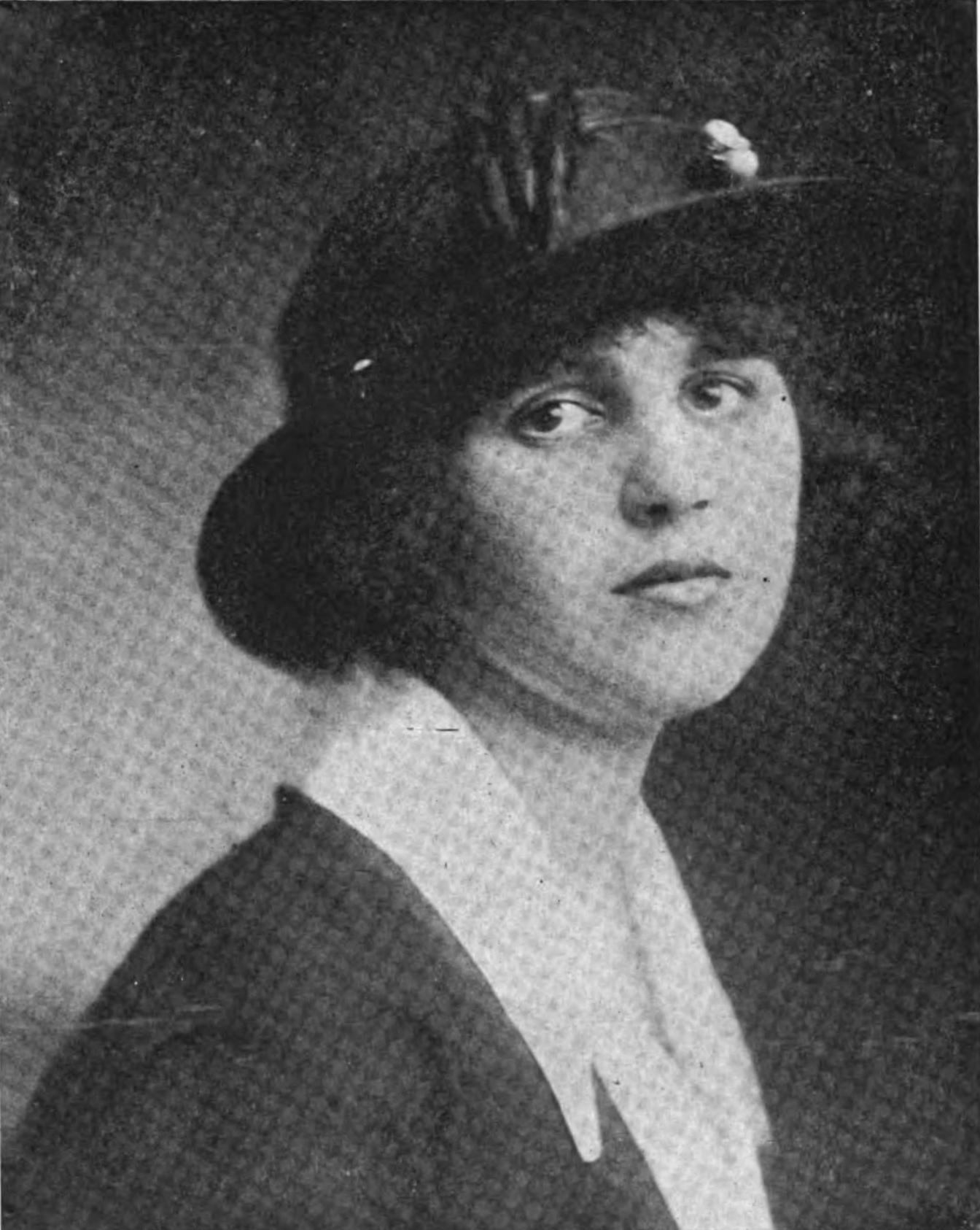
- Born: Alice Gwynne; 1898; Hempstead, New York, U.S.
- Died: December 23, 1946 (aged 48); New York City, New York, U.S.
- Occupation: Socialite
- Spouses: Horace R. Bigelow Allen (m. 1919; div. 1924) Jerome Preston (m. 1925; died 1934)
- Children: 2

Alice "Kiki" Preston (née Gwynne, formerly Allen; 1898 – December 23, 1946) was an American socialite, a member of the Happy Valley set, and the alleged mother of a child born out of wedlock with Prince George, Duke of Kent, fourth son of King George V. The child is rumored to be Michael Temple Canfield.

Her drug addiction earned her the nickname "the girl with the silver syringe". Preston was a fixture of high social circles in Paris and New York City, and a relative of the prominent Vanderbilt and Whitney families. Preston's life was marred by several tragic losses and her own mental problems, which eventually led to her suicide at age 48.

== Biography ==
=== Early life ===
Preston was born in 1898 in Hempstead, New York, the daughter of Edward Erskine Gwynne, Sr. (1869 – 10 May 1904) and his wife Helen Steele (d. January 4, 1958). Preston's mother was a great-granddaughter of Justice Samuel Chase, one of the signatories of the United States Declaration of Independence, as well as a granddaughter of Joshua Barney, commodore of the United States Navy during the American Revolutionary War. She was descended from Peter Jacquette, the second Dutch governor of Delaware. Preston's father was the nephew of tycoon Cornelius Vanderbilt II and his wife, socialite Alice Gwynne Vanderbilt, making him a distant relation of the wealthy Whitney family.

Preston's parents were married in New York City on May 25, 1896. The marriage was a rocky one, and they were separated at some point before reconciling. Besides Kiki, they also had two sons, one being Edward Erskine Gwynne, Jr. (1899 – 5 May 1948), known as Erskine Gwynne, who later became a writer, the publisher of the magazine Boulevardier, and a columnist for the European edition of the New York Herald Tribune. Their other son, Edward C. Gwynne, joined the United States Army Air Corps in his early youth and was killed when his aircraft was shot down. Between 1898 and 1904, Preston and her family resided at different times in Paris, Nassau County, and Park Hill in New York.

=== Family bankruptcy ===
A socialite without regular employment, Preston's father was described as a man who "had extravagant tastes, expended money lavishly and was without business employment", a fact which led his family to legal troubles. In 1899, while in Paris, Gwynne obtained a loan worth several thousand dollars from a jeweler. In February 1901, Gwynne transferred his interest in his property to his mother, Louise Gwynne. In the fall of 1901, the Paris money lender filed suit against Gwynne, for an unpaid loan of nearly $50,000 for diamonds. Shortly after his mother's death, in June 1902, Edward Gwynne filed a petition in bankruptcy, with liabilities of over $56,000 and assets of $57. Two years later, on May 10, 1904, Preston's father died of acute kidney problems at the age of 35, the same day the case of the suit was to be brought up in the court. Preston was five years old at the time.

After Louise Gwynne's death, the property that had been conveyed to her by her son was held in trust for Preston and her siblings. However, in February 1908, the Paris money lender revived his legal attack against the Gwynnes, demanding their property in lieu of the unpaid loan of $40,000. In March, following a long discussion, the suit against the Gwynnes was dismissed. The judge ruled that the realty transfer performed by Edward to his mother was not made with the intent to defraud creditors. However, he also spoke rather harshly of Preston's father, referring to him as a man who "may have had large expectancies, but seems to have been a drain upon his mother's financial resources".

Following her father's death, Preston was mostly raised in Paris, together with her brothers, although the family occasionally returned to their New York residence for brief periods of time. Preston was also educated in England. The money lender continued with a series of court appeals between 1910 and 1912, although the Gwynne family managed to emerge victorious from the lengthy legal battle.

According to writers Lynn Kear and John Rossman, Preston also worked as a cabaret performer in her youth.

=== Marriages and Happy Valley ===
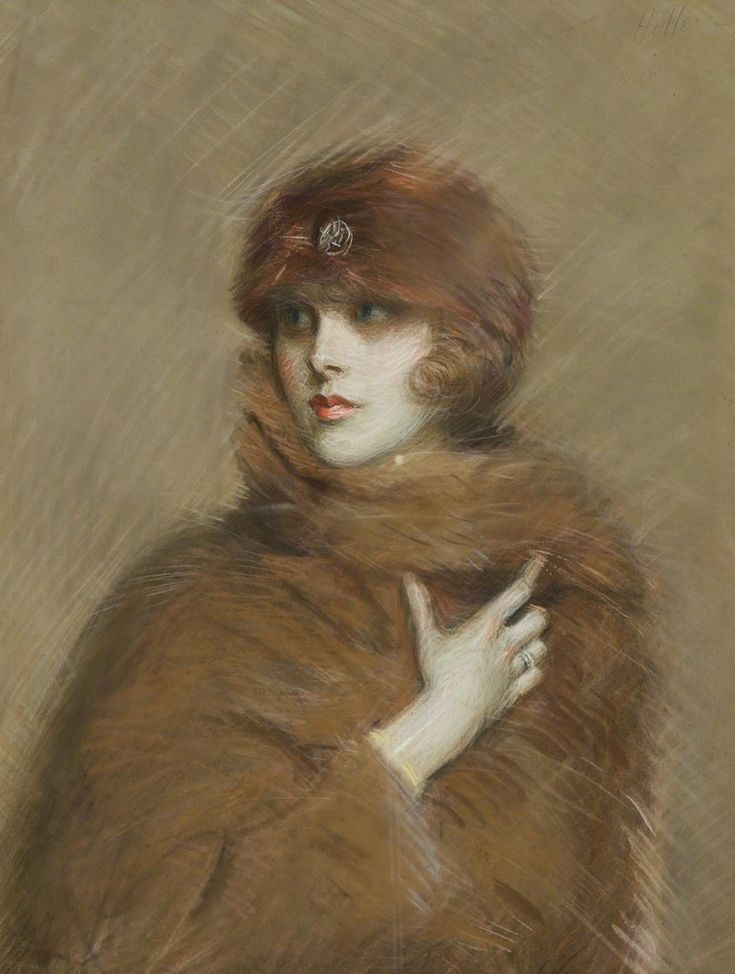
Portrait by Paul César Helleu

In 1919, she married Horace R. Bigelow Allen, after he completed his service with the United States Army. In later years, Allen became an executive in a plastics corporation. Preston and Horace had a daughter, Alice Gwynne Allen, who later married pilot officer Geoffrey Borden Russell, as well as a son, Ethan Allen. Living in Paris with her husband, Preston met and befriended some of the future key members of the Happy Valley set, such as Alice de Janzé and Josslyn Hay, 22nd Earl of Erroll. The Happy Valley set was a community of mainly British expatriates in Kenya, in the Wanjohi Valley close to the Aberdare Mountains, which had become known for its hedonistic lifestyle. In November 1924, Preston applied for divorce at the Paris courts, on the grounds of desertion. Horace R. B. Allen died on December 17, 1961, in Harbour Island, Bahamas.

In April 1925, Preston married investment banker Jerome "Gerry" Preston (15 March 1897 – 28 May 1934), a Harvard alumnus from Colorado, a man later described by writer Frédéric de Janzé in his memoirs as "a creature of instincts" and "untamed". Shortly afterwards, she formed a brief but close friendship with actress Kay Francis. Following travel to the British East Africa colony of Kenya, the home of the Happy Valley clique, Preston and her husband were persuaded to permanently move there, after a friend of the couple gave them the land she had on the shores of Lake Naivasha. The Prestons lived in a Dutch-style house they built at the shores of Lake Naivasha and associated with the Happy Valley set. Both she and her husband were successful as big game hunters and horse breeders. On their farm, they entertained several guests at times, including actor Gary Cooper on one occasion. Friends of the couple in the community included Alice de Janzé, Lord Erroll and his wife Idina (Preston was often entertained in their mansion), writer Evelyn Waugh and aviator Beryl Markham.

Preston was a scandalous presence among the Happy Valley set, noted both for her beauty, as well as her wild lifestyle, which included partying all night long, rising from bed during dinnertime and drug abuse. Preston had become a notorious drug addict by that point; taking heroin, cocaine and morphine. She was nicknamed "the girl with the silver syringe", due to her habit of always carrying with her a syringe with which she injected herself. She was reported to often take out the silver syringe to inject herself, oblivious to onlookers. Swedish Baron Bror von Blixen-Finecke's second wife Cockie once remarked of Preston: "She's very clever with her needle". Preston was one of the clients of Frank Greswolde Williams, the main drug dealer of the Kenya colony, until his death in 1932. Whenever she was out of morphine, she sent a plane to pick up new supplies.

Preston had many lovers during that time, including actor Rudolph Valentino and Prince George, Duke of Kent, whom she first met in the mid-1920s. Through 1928, she introduced him to cocaine and morphine among other drugs. Reportedly, Prince George had a ménage à trois with Preston and an Argentinian named Jorge Ferrara.

In an attempt to rescue his cocaine-addicted brother from the influence of Preston, Edward, Prince of Wales tried to persuade George and Preston to break off their relationship, but he was unsuccessful. Eventually, Edward forced George to stop seeing Preston and also forced Preston to leave England, while she was visiting George there in the summer of 1929. For years afterwards, Edward feared that George might relapse to drugs if he maintained his contact with Preston. Indeed, in 1932, Prince George ran into Preston unexpectedly at Cannes and had to be removed almost by force.

=== Personal losses ===
In the 1930s and 1940s, many people in her social circle of relatives and friends met untimely deaths. Previously, in May 1929, her 30-year-old brother, Edward Erskine Jr., almost died of a heart attack. Preston rushed back to Paris to be by his side because it was believed he was close to death. Erskine ultimately survived.

On November 16, 1933, her cousin, 26-year-old socialite William K. Vanderbilt III, son of William K. II and Virginia Fair Vanderbilt, was killed in a car accident; her brother, Erskine, was also in the car and suffered minor injuries. In August 1935, he was in another accident, when the car he was driving collided with a truck, injuring three. He was tried, fined $50, and incurred a 30-day suspended sentence. On account of that accident, Erskine later suffered a paralysis in 1938.

On May 28, 1934, Preston's husband, Jerome Preston, died at the Hotel Pierre, in New York, aged 37, making her a widow at the age of 36. In February 1937, her brother-in-law (Jerome's brother), sportsman Lewis Thompson Preston also died, at age 37. On January 25, 1941, her friend, 22nd Earl of Erroll, aged 39, was murdered in Kenya. Later that year, on September 30, her friend and fellow American expatriate in Paris, Alice de Janzé, committed suicide with a firearm. On August 25, 1942, her former lover, Prince George, was killed in a plane accident, aged 39.

On June 6, 1944, her son Ethan Allen was killed during the Normandy Landings. Allen was serving with the Royal Canadian Air Force.

=== Death ===
After suffering from mental health issues for several years, Preston died by suicide on the night of December 23, 1946, jumping out of a window of her fifth-floor apartment in the Stanhope Hotel of New York City and landing in a courtyard of the hotel. According to her companion, Lillian Turner, Preston had been in poor health, depressed and nervous. Turner had just given Preston a glass of milk and then went into the living room of the fifth-floor apartment to read. When she heard no sounds coming from Preston's bedroom, she entered it, finding a window open and Preston gone. Preston's pyjama-clad body was discovered in an alleyway behind the hotel. Preston's mother, Helen Steele, was living at the same hotel at the time. Today, Preston's home on Lake Naivasha is inhabited by the 7th Earl of Enniskillen.

== Rumours of royal illegitimate birth ==
It has been alleged that American publishing executive Michael Temple Canfield (1926–1969) was the illegitimate son of Prince George and Preston. According to various sources, both Edward VIII (later the Duke of Windsor) and Loelia, Duchess of Westminster, shared this belief.

Canfield was born in 1926 and was the adopted son of Cass Canfield, American publisher of Harper and Row. Michael Canfield attended The Groton School, before serving in the United States Marine Corps during World War II and was wounded at Iwo Jima. He graduated from Harvard University in 1951 and worked as London representative of Harper and Row. He married twice, first to Caroline Lee Bouvier, younger sister of Jacqueline Kennedy, in 1953 (divorced in 1958) and then to (Frances) Laura Ward, Countess of Dudley in 1960. Canfield died on December 20, 1969, of a heart attack, while on a New York-to-London flight, at the age of 43.

== Dramatizations ==
Preston is referenced in James Fox's best-selling investigative non-fiction book White Mischief (1982). Together with other personalities of the Happy Valley set, she appears as a fictional character in Paul Di Filippo's short story "A Happy Valley at the End of the World", included in the author's collection of short stories Lost Pages (1998). She also appears as a character in Clint Jefferies' play African Nights. The play is set in the Happy Valley community in Kenya, in the year 1928 and portrays, among other things, the romance between Preston and Prince George. From May to June 2004, the play was performed on the Wings Theater in New York. Preston was portrayed by actress Karen Stanion.
