= Ann Fleming =

English society hostess (1913–1981)

- Fleming in 1957
- Born: Anne Geraldine Mary Charteris; 19 June 1913; Westminster, London, England
- Died: 12 July 1981 (aged 68); Sevenhampton, Wiltshire, England
- Education: Cheltenham Ladies' College
- Known for: Socialite
- Spouses: Shane O'Neill, 3rd Baron O'Neill (m. 1932; died 1944); Esmond Harmsworth, 2nd Viscount Rothermere (m. 1945; div. 1951); Ian Fleming (m. 1952; died 1964)
- Children: 3, including Raymond O'Neill
- Relatives: Laura Spencer-Churchill, Duchess of Marlborough (sister); Hugo Charteris (brother); Sara Morrison (niece); Fred Again (great-grandson)

Ann Geraldine Mary Fleming (née Charteris, formerly Baroness O'Neill and Viscountess Rothermere; 19 June 1913 – 12 July 1981) was a British aristocrat and socialite. She had three husbands: Lord O'Neill, Lord Rothermere and Ian Fleming.

== Early life ==
Anne Geraldine Mary Charteris was born in Westminster, London, on 19 June 1913. She was the eldest daughter of Frances Lucy Tennant (1887–1925) and Capt. Hon. Guy Lawrence Charteris (1886–1967). Her sister was Laura Spencer-Churchill, Duchess of Marlborough, and her brother was the novelist Hugo Charteris.

Her paternal grandparents were Hugo Charteris, 11th Earl of Wemyss and Mary Constance Wyndham, who had her own hedonistic past, having been one of The Souls. Her maternal grandparents were Francis John "Frank" Tennant (a son of Sir Charles Tennant, 1st Baronet) and Annie Geraldine (née Redmayne) Tennant. Her maternal aunt, Kathleen Tennant, was the wife of John Manners, 9th Duke of Rutland.

She was educated by governesses after an unsuccessful term at Cheltenham Ladies' College. She had a good understanding of literature but her future was to be a debutante.

== Personal life ==
In 1932 she married Shane O'Neill, 3rd Baron O'Neill, who was both an aristocrat and a financier. Before Ann began an affair with the influential Esmond Cecil Harmsworth in 1936, the couple had two children:

- Raymond Arthur Clanaboy O'Neill, 4th Baron O'Neill (born 1933), who married Georgina Mary Scott, eldest daughter of Lord George Scott (youngest son of the 7th Duke of Buccleuch) in 1963.
- Hon. Fionn Frances Bride O'Neill (born 1936), who married Sir John Albert Leigh Morgan, a diplomat who served as Ambassador to South Korea, Poland and Mexico.

In 1940, Esmond Harmsworth became the 2nd Viscount Rothermere. Ann's husband went to war; she then appeared with Harmsworth, as well as having an affair with Ian Fleming, at that time a stockbroker, who became an assistant to the Director of Naval Intelligence. Lord O'Neill was killed in action in 1944.

=== Second marriage ===
Following Lord O'Neill's death in 1944, Ann married Lord Rothermere in 1945. Harmsworth was the heir to Harold Harmsworth, 1st Viscount Rothermere, who owned the Daily Mail.

The couple entertained, and their social circle included the painter Lucian Freud (who painted her portrait), the choreographer Frederick Ashton and the artist Francis Bacon. Meanwhile, Ian Fleming left the Navy and became a journalist with The Sunday Times. He had built Goldeneye on land in the British Colony of Jamaica and he had demanded three-month vacations from his employer to enjoy his holiday home. The two spent three months of every year together in Jamaica. Her new husband thought she was in Jamaica to visit Noël Coward. In 1951 she was divorced by Lord Rothermere.

=== Third marriage ===
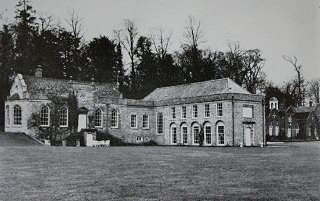
Warneford Place at Sevenhampton

The year following her divorce from Lord Rothermere, she married Fleming. Ann was pregnant with her son when they married. They had one child:

- Caspar Fleming (1952–1975), who died in London in October 1975 from an overdose of narcotics.

Anxiety over his forthcoming marriage is said to be the reason that Ian Fleming wrote the first James Bond novel, Casino Royale. Ann had a £100,000 divorce settlement and Fleming sought additional sources of revenue to add to his salary from The Sunday Times. The book and its sequels were immediate successes. Ann also had a long-term affair with the Labour Party politician Hugh Gaitskell.

The Flemings bought a house in London, where they entertained. They later rebuilt Warneford Place at Sevenhampton, near Swindon, renaming it Sevenhampton Place and moving there in 1963. Her husband was not keen on the socialising, but their houses attracted Evelyn Waugh, Cyril Connolly and Peter Quennell.

Ian died in 1964 and their son, Caspar, died in 1975. Ann Fleming died at Sevenhampton Place on 12 July 1981. Both were buried alongside Ian at the church of St James in Sevenhampton.
