= Hugo Charteris, 11th Earl of Wemyss =

Scottish peer (1857–1937)

The Right Honourable The Earl of Wemyss and March DL
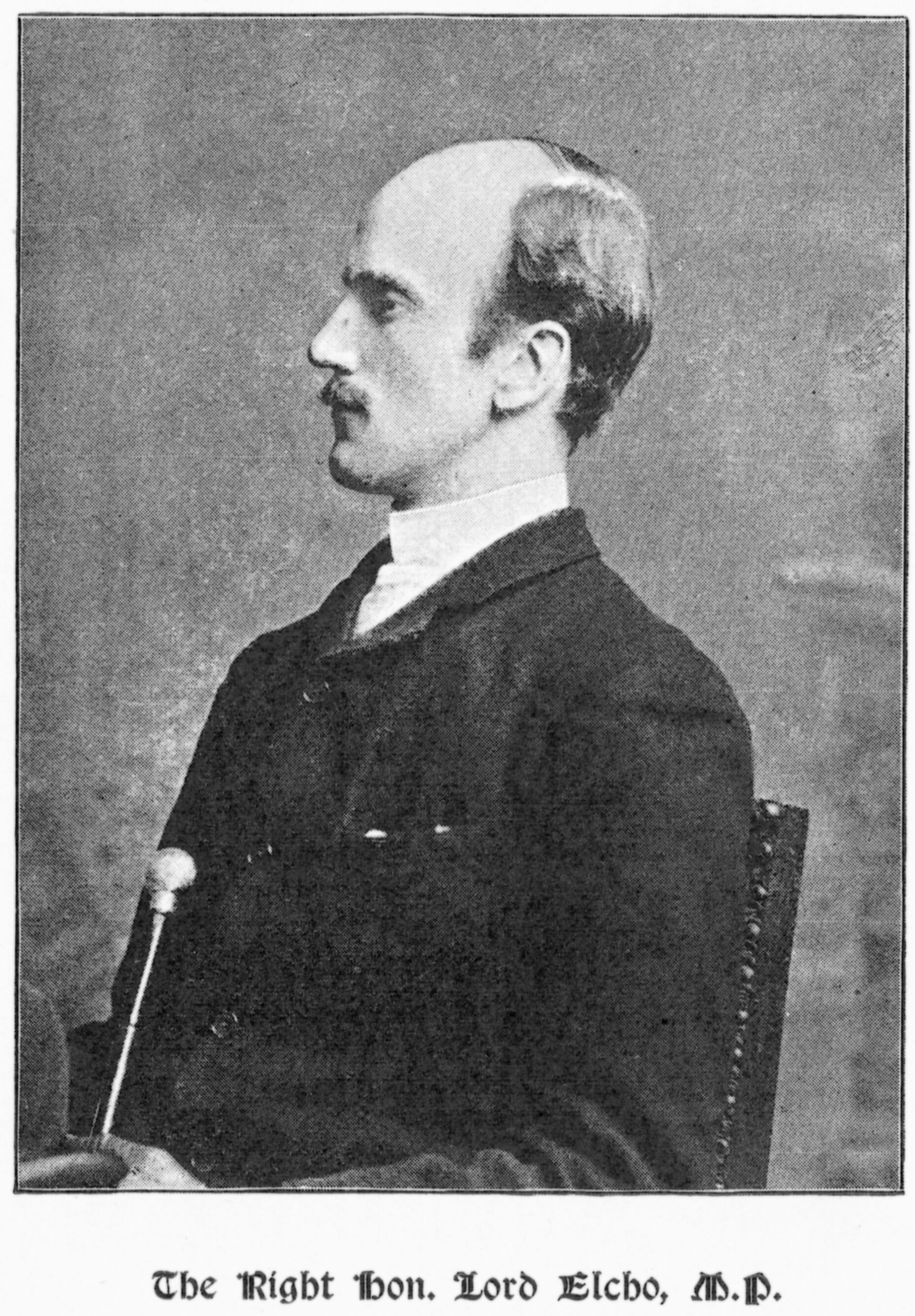
- Pictured in Suffolk Celebrities, 1893

Member of Parliament for Ipswich
- In office 1886–1895 (with Charles Dalrymple)
- Preceded by: Jesse Collings; Henry Wyndham West
- Succeeded by: Charles Dalrymple; Daniel Ford Goddard

Member of Parliament for Haddingtonshire
- In office 1883–1885
- Preceded by: Lord Elcho
- Succeeded by: Viscount Haldane

Personal details
- Born: Hugo Richard Charteris; 25 August 1857 Edinburgh, Lothian, Scotland
- Died: 12 July 1937 (aged 79)
- Party: Conservative
- Spouse: Mary Constance Wyndham (m. 1883; died 1937)
- Children: 7
- Parent(s): Francis Charteris, 10th Earl of Wemyss; Lady Anne Anson
- Profession: Politician

Hugo Richard Charteris, 11th Earl of Wemyss and 7th Earl of March, DL (25 August 1857 – 12 July 1937), styled Lord Elcho from 1883 to 1914, was a British Conservative politician.

== Early life ==
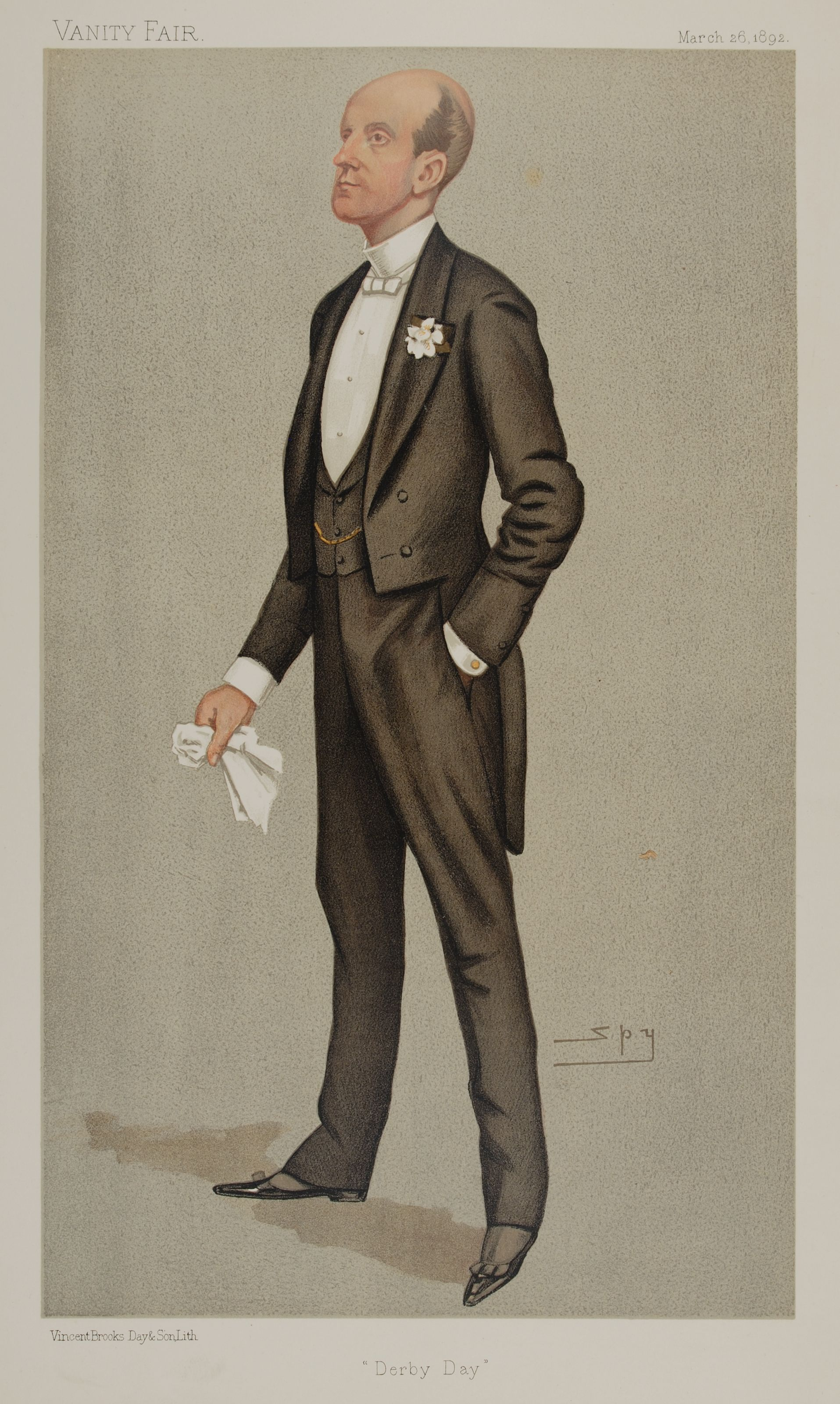
Lord Elcho as caricatured by Spy (Leslie Ward) in Vanity Fair, March 1892

He was the fifth but eldest surviving son of The 10th Earl of Wemyss and his wife, Lady Anne Frederica Anson. His sister, Evelyn Charteris, was married to John Vesey, 4th Viscount de Vesci; their only child (Mary Gertrude Vesey) was the second wife of Aubrey Herbert (second son of The 4th Earl of Carnarvon), whose daughter Laura Herbert married the writer Evelyn Waugh and was the mother of Auberon Waugh.

His father was the eldest son, and heir, of The 9th Earl of Wemyss (and 5th Earl of March). His mother was a daughter of Thomas Anson, 1st Earl of Lichfield.

== Career ==
He entered Parliament for Haddingtonshire in 1883 (succeeding his father), but lost his seat in the 1885 general election. He returned to the House of Commons in a by-election in 1886 as one of two representatives for Ipswich and held it in the subsequent general election and would continue to hold it until 1895.

Lord and Lady Elcho visited British India to attend the 1903 Delhi Durbar held in January 1903 to celebrated the succession of King Edward VII as Emperor of India.

He succeeded his father in the two earldoms in 1914 and served as Lord-Lieutenant of Haddingtonshire from 1918 to 1937.

== Personal life ==
Portrait of his wife, and her sisters, The Wyndham Sisters, by John Singer Sargent, 1899 (Metropolitan Museum)

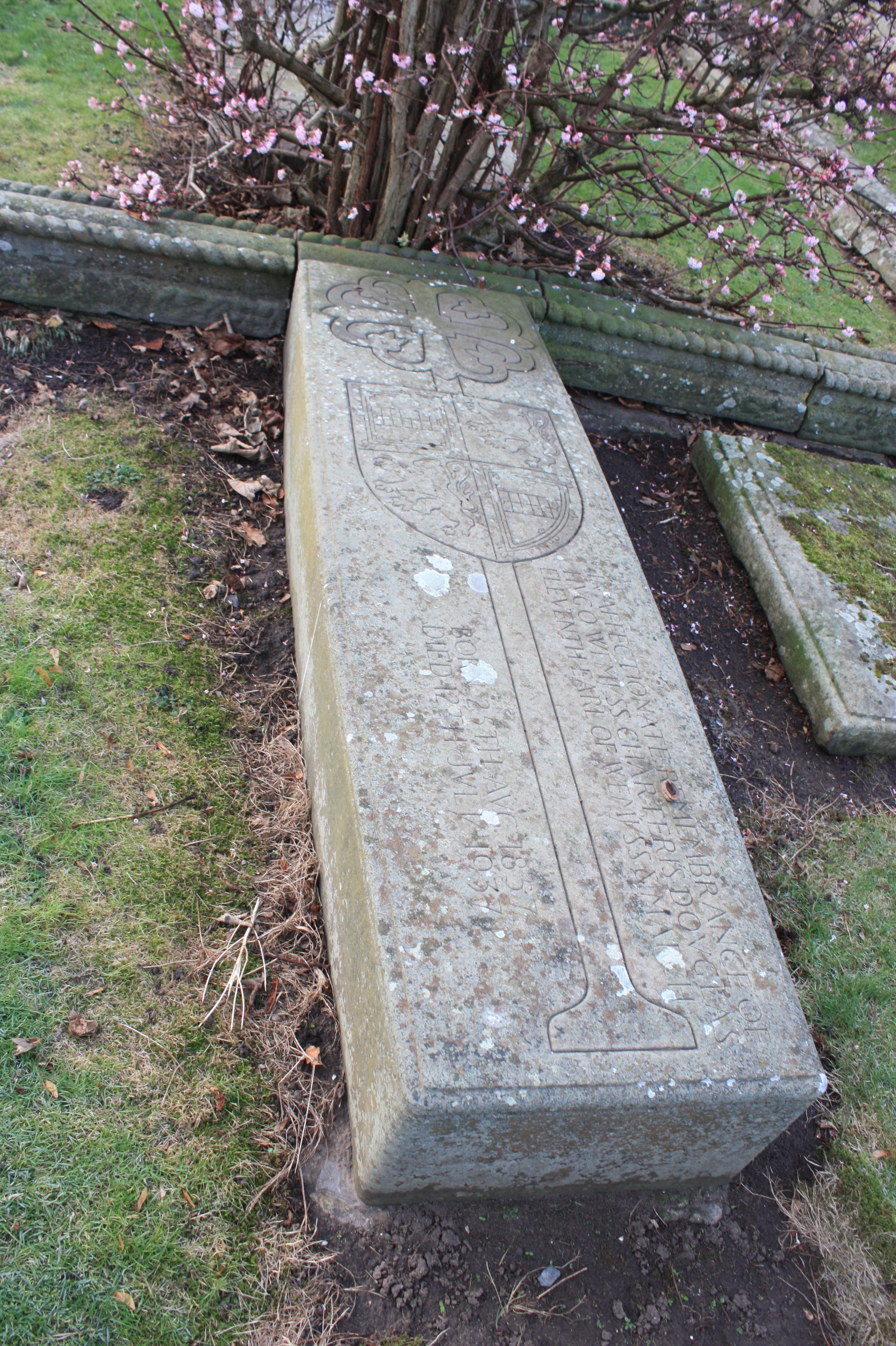
The grave of Hugo, 11th Earl of Wemyss and 7th Earl of March, Aberlady Churchyard

In 1883, he married Mary Constance Wyndham (1862–1937), daughter of Percy Scawen Wyndham and sister of George Wyndham. They were both two of the original members of The Souls. His married life was detailed in the book Those Wild Wyndhams by Claudia Renton. Among their children were:

- Captain Hugo Francis Charteris, Lord Elcho (1884–1916), killed in action during the Great War, whilst serving with the Royal Gloucestershire Hussars. He is commemorated on the Jerusalem Memorial. He married Lady Violet Catherine Manners, the daughter of Henry Manners, 8th Duke of Rutland, in 1911.
- Guy Lawrence Charteris (1886–1967), married Frances Tennant, sister of Kathleen Manners, Duchess of Rutland and they were parents of Ann Fleming, Hugo Charteris and Laura Spencer-Churchill, Duchess of Marlborough.
- Lady Cynthia Mary Evelyn Charteris (1887–1960), a writer who married Herbert Asquith (1881–1947), son of Prime Minister H. H. Asquith.
- Colin Charteris (1889–1892), who died young.
- Lady Mary Pamela Madeline Sibell Charteris (1895–1991), who married Capt. Algernon Walter Strickland (1891–1938), son of Algernon Henry Peter Strickland, in 1915. After his death, she married Maj. John George Lyon, son of John Stewart Lyon, 4th of Kirkmichael, in 1943.
- Second Lieutenant Yvo Alan Charteris (1896–1915), also killed in action during the Great War, whilst serving with 1st Bn. Grenadier Guards. He is buried in Sailly-Labourse Communal Cemetery, five kilometers southeast of Bethune.
- Lady Irene Corona Charteris (1902–1989), who married Ivor Windsor-Clive, 2nd Earl of Plymouth (1889–1943).

Charteris had a relationship with Hermione, wife of Gerald FitzGerald, 5th Duke of Leinster, and is thought to have been the biological father of her son, Edward FitzGerald, 7th Duke of Leinster.

By 1912, Lady Angela Forbes was his mistress, sharing his house in East Lothian, while his wife lived at Stanway in Gloucestershire. Although he and his mistress lived together for many years, he remained married, and his wife became Countess of Wemyss when he inherited the earldom. She died in April 1937, aged 74. Lord Wemyss survived her by three months and died in July of the same year, aged 79. He is buried in the family burial enclosure on the north side of Aberlady churchyard.

=== Descendants ===
Lord Wemyss was succeeded in his titles by his grandson David; two of his sons, Captain Hugo Francis Charteris (1884–1916) and Lt Yvo Alan Charteris (1896–1915), had been killed in action during the First World War.

His grandson by Hugo Francis Charteris was Martin Charteris, Private Secretary to princess, then queen Elizabeth II.

His grandchildren by Guy Lawrence Charteris were the socialite Ann Fleming, and Hugo Charteris, a post-war author and screenwriter. He is the great-grandfather of Lady Mary Charteris of the band The Big Pink.

Edward FitzGerald, 7th Duke of Leinster is thought to have been his biological son.

== Sources ==
- Kidd, Charles, Williamson, David (editors). Debrett's Peerage and Baronetage (1990 edition). New York: St Martin's Press, 1990,
- Leigh Rayment's Peerage Pages
- Leigh Rayment's Historical List of MPs

Parliament of the United Kingdom
Preceded by Lord Elcho	Member of Parliament for Haddingtonshire; 1883 – 1885	Succeeded by Richard Haldane
Preceded by Jesse Collings; Henry Wyndham West	Member of Parliament for Ipswich; 1886 – 1895; With: Charles Dalrymple	Succeeded by Charles Dalrymple; Daniel Ford Goddard
Honorary titles
Preceded by The Earl of Haddington	Lord Lieutenant of East Lothian; 1918–1937	Succeeded by The Lord Polwarth
Peerage of Scotland
Preceded by Francis Charteris	Earl of Wemyss; 1914–1937	Succeeded by David Charteris
Preceded by Francis Charteris	Earl of March; 1914–1937	Succeeded by David Charteris
Peerage of the United Kingdom
Preceded by Francis Charteris	Baron Wemyss; 1914–1937; Member of the House of Lords (1914–1937)	Succeeded by David Charteris
