= Ernest Ingersoll =

American naturalist, writer and explorer

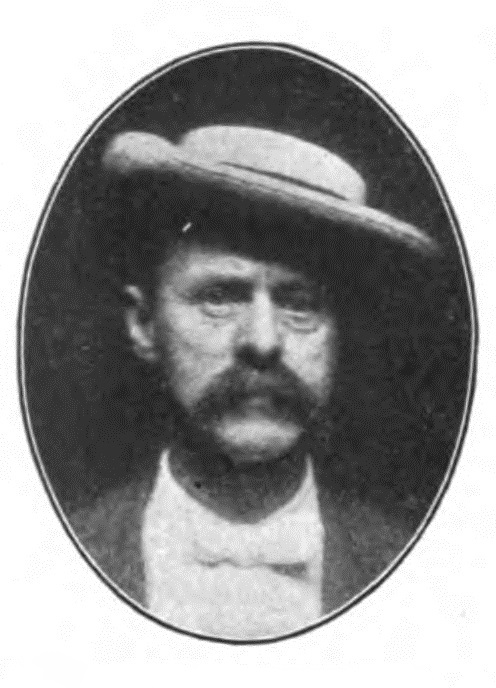
Portrait of Ernest Ingersoll (no later than 1906)

Ernest Ingersoll (March 13, 1852 – November 13, 1946) was an American naturalist, writer and explorer.

== Biography ==
A native of Monroe, Michigan, Ingersoll studied for a time at Oberlin College and afterward at Harvard University, where he was a pupil of Louis Agassiz. Agassiz died in 1873, and Ingersoll made his journalistic debut with an article for the New York Tribune in January 1874 on Agassiz' work, for which he received $40 and the request for more scientific articles. In 1874, he went West as zoologist in the Hayden survey of 1874. In 1875, Ingersoll published a scientific paper describing what he had collected, mostly mollusks. On the expedition he made friends with photographer William Henry Jackson. They were the first scientists to investigate and describe the Mesa Verde cliff dwellings. Ingersoll sent dispatches to the Tribune, and the result was an offer to join its staff that year, which he accepted. While working as a reporter, he also wrote articles for an antecedent of Field and Stream and other magazines.

In 1877, he made a second trip West, again writing articles for periodicals on his experiences. 1879 found him visiting Colorado and writing on mining operations. That year he also began his work describing shellfisheries for a joint project of the United States Fish Commission and the United States Census Bureau. That project lasted until 1881. His reports treated modern fisheries, and also discussed shellfish utilization much earlier by Native Americans and early societies worldwide.

Ingersoll was an early advocate of protection of wildlife and natural habitats, and preferred field notes and photographs to taking specimens. These views he presented in popular lectures around 1888. From the 1890s to 1905, he updated guide books for Rand McNally. He took up residence in New York City in 1900. At that time he was writing a weekly column for a Montreal paper. Letters he received from readers indicated a need for material on bird identification, and he did a series of articles presenting a list of Canadian birds with descriptions. He did a similar list for Canadian snakes, which his daughter Helen helped write and illustrate. Helen also helped illustrate some of his books. He stopped writing the column in 1938, when he retired. Ernest Ingersoll was 94 years old when he died in a Brattleboro, Vermont, nursing home after a four-year illness.

== Family ==
He married Mary Schofield (1853-1920) in 1873. They had two children: Helen (b. 1874), and Geoffrey (b. 1889).

== Select bibliography ==
=== Books ===
- Nests and Eggs of North American Birds, parts i-vii (1880–81)
- Oyster Industries of the United States (1881)
- Friends Worth Knowing (1881)
- Birds'-nesting (1882)
- Knocking Round the Rockies (1883)
- The Ice Queen (1884), Harper & Brothers
- Country Cousins (1884)
- The Crest of the Continent (1885)
- Down East Latch Strings (1887)
- Handy Guide to Washington and the District of Columbia (1896), Rand, McNally & Co.
- The Silver Caves, A Mining Story 1890
- Wild Neighbors (1897)
- Gold Fields of the Klondike and the Wonders of Alaska (1897)
- The Book of the Ocean (1898)
- Nature's Calendar (1900)
- Handy Guide to New York City (1900), Rand, McNally & Co.
- Wild Life of Orchard and Field (1902)
- Life of Animals: The Mammals (1906; second edition, 1907)
- Eight Secrets (1906)
- The Wit of the Wild (1906)
- Animal Competitors (1911)
- Birds in Legend, Fable, and Folklore (Longmans, Green and Co., 1923)
- Dragons and Dragon Lore (with an introduction by Henry Fairfield Osborn) (1928); The Illustrated Book of Dragons and Dragon Lore (2013). Chiang Mai: Cognoscenti Books. ASIN B00D959PJ0

=== Articles ===
- "At the Gateway of the Catskills". Harper's New Monthly Magazine. 54 (Dec. 1876 – May 1877): 816–824. 1850.
- "The City of Atlanta". Harper's New Monthly Magazine. 60: 30–43. December 1879.
- "La Villa Real de Santa Fe". Harper's New Monthly Magazine. 60 (Dec. 1879 – May 1880): 667–682. 1850.
- "Milwaukee". Harper's New Monthly Magazine. 62 (Dec. 1880 - May 1881): 702–718. 1850.
- "In the Wahlamet Valley of Oregon". Harper's New Monthly Magazine. 65 (Jan.–Nov. 1882): 764–771. 1850.
- Ingersoll, Ernest (May 1883). "Wampum and its History". The American Naturalist. XVII (5): 469–479. doi:10.1086/273355. S2CID 84310560.
- Ingersoll, Ernest (December 1886). "The Scallop and its Fishery". The American Naturalist. XX (12): 1001–1006. doi:10.1086/274381. S2CID 84026666.

He also contributed articles to the New International Encyclopedia and Encyclopedia Americana.
