= Hugo Charteris =

Scottish writer

Personal details
- Born: Hugo Francis Guy Charteris; 11 December 1922 26 Catherine Street, Victoria, London, England
- Died: 20 December 1970 (aged 48) Elvington, North Yorkshire, England
- Spouse(s): Virginia Mary Forbes Adam (m. 1948)
- Children: 5
- Parents: Captain Hon. Guy Lawrence Charteris (father); Francis Lucy Tennant (mother)
- Relatives: Laura Spencer-Churchill, Duchess of Marlborough (sister); Ann Fleming (sister); Ian Fleming (brother-in-law); Sara Morrison (niece); Martin Charteris (cousin); Francis Charteris
- Education: Eton College
- Alma mater: Trinity College, Oxford
- Occupation: novelist, journalist, screenwriter

Military service
- Allegiance: United Kingdom
- Branch/service: British Army
- Years of service: 1941–1944
- Rank: Lieutenant
- Unit: Scots Guards
- Battles/wars: World War II
- Awards: Military Cross

Hugo Francis Guy Charteris MC (11 December 1922 – 20 December 1970) was a noted British novelist and screenwriter, the author of nine novels, 17 television screenplays and numerous children's books and short stories.

== Early life ==
Charteris was born in London, the fourth child of Captain Hon. Guy Lawrence Charteris (1886–1967, the son of Hugo Charteris, 11th Earl of Wemyss, and Mary Constance Wyndham), and his first wife, Frances Lucy Tennant (1887–1925), a granddaughter of Sir Charles Tennant. His sisters were the socialite Ann Fleming and Laura Spencer-Churchill, Duchess of Marlborough. He and his sisters grew up at Stanway House surrounded by the creative influence of close family friends such as James Barrie, who would write plays for them to perform during the summer months. Charteris was educated at Eton and in 1941 he left to join the Scots Guards. He was twice wounded in the war, and received a Military Cross in Italy for defending his position against continuous enemy attack.

== Career ==
After the war, he went to Malaya and Java where he served as a public relations officer for south-east Asia command (1945–47). He then went to Oxford where he read English at Trinity College for a few frustrating terms (1947–48). In 1948 he married Virginia Mary (born 1922), daughter of Colin Forbes Adam and granddaughter of Beilby Lawley, 3rd Baron Wenlock. Together they had two sons and three daughters. The eldest son, Richard, drowned at their home in Scotland in 1951.

Through his brother-in-law, newspaper baron Esmond Harmsworth, 2nd Viscount Rothermere, he got work with the Daily Mail, where he was sub-editor until he was sent to Paris as second correspondent, mainly writing articles for the continental edition of the Mail.

He retired from full-time journalism in 1951 when he decided to settle in Sutherland, intending to live as a novelist. While being sustained by commissions from Punch and The Telegraph magazines, Charteris wrote his first novel, A Share of the World, which was published in 1953. Francis Wyndham hailed it as "the most impressive first novel that has appeared since the war". Charteris went on to write eight further novels to great critical acclaim. His depiction of the aristocracy was often informed or based upon the lives of his relations. The family in his first novel was based upon his parents-in-law and he portrays Guy, his father, affectionately in many novels. Sir Oswald Mosley, who was related by marriage to his wife's family, launched but later abandoned a libel action over the tragic fascist portrayed in The River Watcher (1965). Charteris later developed a strong friendship with Mosley's son, Nicholas Mosley, who inspired a Congo mercenary in that same novel.

After 1965 Charteris wrote for television. His most popular work was Take Three Girls (1969–71), based upon a flat-share. His greatest critical success came, however, with The Toggle, a moving portrayal of the helpless isolation of a schoolboy controlled by cold, harsh adults.

He still wrote occasional pieces for newspapers and in 1959 interviewed Carl Jung for The Daily Telegraph at Bollingen.

He worked with BBC producer Verity Lambert on scripts to adapt his novel, The Coat (1966), into either a film or television series. Work continued on the screenplays after his death by other writers but the ideas never came to fruition.

His novel, The Tide is Right, was written in 1957 but was suppressed on the demands of people who thought they had been characterised. It was eventually published in 1991, 21 years after Charteris's death, with a new introduction written by Nicholas Mosley.

Critical praise for Charteris:

"Hugo Charteris was among the most gifted British novelists of the postwar generation and The Tide is Right (which was never published in his lifetime) is one of his best books. He wrote, in my opinion, more truthfully about the upper classes than any of his contemporaries. This study of family jealousy and dispossession in an old Scottish landowning family is as exciting as a thriller but its qualities are more than purely narrative. The people and the place are seen with an unmatched intensity and brought to life by a distinctive prose style of rare beauty and extraordinary expressive power."—Francis Wyndham

== Personal life ==
Charteris was noted for his beauty in youth, and later was gauntly handsome. He died of cancer on 20 December 1970, at his home, The Grange, Elvington, Yorkshire, and was buried in St Helen's churchyard, Skipwith, York. His widow, Virginia Charteris, never remarried and died aged 90 in 2012. She was interred next to her husband.

In 1952 his sister Ann Fleming married the writer Ian Fleming; she had earlier been married to Esmond Harmsworth, 2nd Viscount Rothermere.

== Novels ==
- A Share of the World (1953); new publication: introduced by Jane Charteris, Gawler South, South Australia : Michael Walmer, 2014, ISBN 978-0-9925234-2-8
- Marching with April (1956); new publication: introduced by Frederic Raphael, with a review by Elizabeth Bowen, Adelaide, South Australia : Michael Walmer, 2017, ISBN 978-0-648-02332-6
- The Tide is Right (publication abandoned 1957, published 1991); introduction by Nicholas Mosley, Elmwood Park, IL, USA : Dalkey Archive Press, 1992, ISBN 978-0-916583-78-1
- Picnic at Porokorro (1958); new edition: Adelaide, South Australia : Michael Walmer, 2019, ISBN 978-0-648-59053-8
- The Lifeline (1961)
- Clunie (1963, children's novel)
- Pictures on the Wall (1963)
- Staying with Aunt Rozzie (1964, children's novel)
- The River Watcher (1965)
- The Coat (1966)
- The Indian Summer of Gabriel Murray (1968)
