= Walter Long (British Army officer) =

British soldier

Brigadier-General The Honourable Walter Long CMG DSO
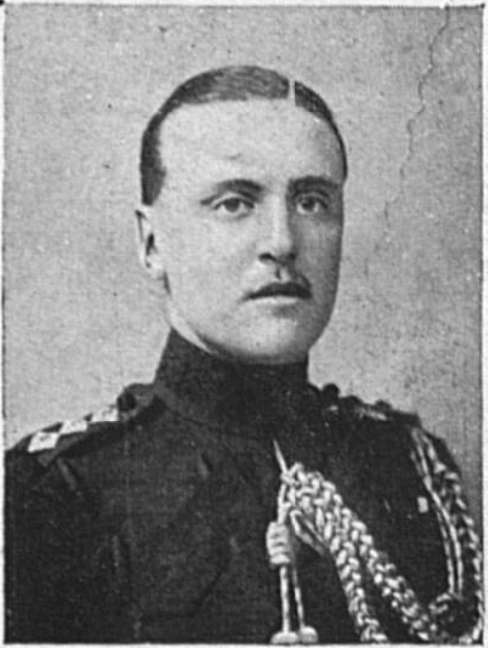
- Born: 26 July 1879
- Died: 28 January 1917 (aged 37) Hébuterne, France

Brigadier-General Walter Long, CMG, DSO (26 July 1879 – 28 January 1917) was a British Army officer.

== Background ==
The eldest son of the 1st Viscount Long and his wife Lady Dorothy (Doreen) Boyle, he was baptised on 11 September 1879 at St John's Church, West Ashton, Trowbridge, Wiltshire.

== Military career ==
Educated at Harrow, he joined the Royal Scots Greys as a second lieutenant on 20 May 1899. In November of that year he went with his regiment to South Africa to serve in the Second Boer War, where he took part in the ride under Sir John French to the relief of Kimberley, Northern Cape, and was badly wounded at Dronfield. On return to duty he was appointed ADC to General Sir Bruce Hamilton, and promoted lieutenant on 10 July 1900. He served throughout the campaign, and was promoted to captain on 23 April 1902. The war formally ended in early June 1902, but Long stayed in South Africa until late November, when he left on the SS Carisbrook Castle. He was mentioned in dispatches several times while in South Africa (including the Final Despatch by Lord Kitchener dated 23 June 1902), and for his service there gained the Distinguished Service Order (DSO), the Queen's South Africa Medal and the King's South Africa Medal, each with two clasps.

When he returned to England, he was made ADC to Sir Harry Scobell commanding the First Cavalry Brigade at Aldershot. Long resigned this appointment in order to return to his regiment. After serving with his regiment for some years, he went to India as additional ADC to General Sir Garrett O'Moore Creagh, and afterwards he went to Canada to serve as ADC to the Duke of Connaught.

Long spent the early part of World War I in France, and took part in the Battle of Mons, after which he was made a Brigadier General. After fighting at the Somme in July 1916 he was highly commended by the commander of his division, General Bridges, who wrote of him that his services were invaluable, and his 'cheery laugh was worth a battalion'.

He was mentioned in dispatches several times by Lord French and also Sir Douglas Haig, and was given a CMG. Shortly before his death he was given a brevet lieutenant-colonelcy.

Long was a champion light-weight boxer while at Harrow, and for two years middle-weight champion in the British Army.

== Family ==
He married on 17 December 1910 in London, Sibell Vanden Bempde-Johnstone OBE, granddaughter of Baron Derwent. There was one son from this marriage, Walter, who succeeded his grandfather as 2nd Viscount Long.

== Death ==
Brigadier-General Long was killed in action at Hébuterne, France on 28 January 1917, aged 37. King George sent a telegram to his father expressing his heartfelt sympathy, regretting that his army had lost one of its promising young generals. He is buried at the Couin British Cemetery, France. His widow remarried on 25 April 1921 to Ralph Glyn, 1st Baron Glyn. She died in 1958.

== Sources ==
- Obituary The Times 30 January 1917; Issue 41389
- Davies, Frank; Maddocks, Graham (2014) [1995]. Bloody Red Tabs: General Officer Casualties of the Great War 1914–1918. Pen and Sword Books. ISBN 978-1-78346-237-7.
