= Charteris =

Charteris is a Scottish surname. Notable people with the surname include:

- Archibald Charteris (1835–1908), Scottish theologian, founder of Life and Work magazine
- Ann Fleming, née Charteris (1913–1981), British socialite, wife of author Ian Fleming
- Belinda Charteris (born 1972), New Zealand netball player and representative
- Catherine Charteris (1837–1918), British philanthropist
- Catherine Charteris, Lady Neidpath (born 1952), British writer and socialite
- Chris Charteris (born 1966), New Zealand sculptor, jeweller and carver
- Ciara Charteris (born 3 August 1995), British producer, writer, activist, and former actress
- Lady Cynthia Asquith, née Charteris (1887–1960), English writer and socialite
- David Charteris, 12th Earl of Wemyss (1912–2008), Scottish landowner and conservationist
- Sir Evan Charteris (1864–1940), British biographer, historian, barrister and arts administrator
- Francis Charteris (disambiguation), several people
- Henry Charteris (1565–1628), Scottish minister, principal of Edinburgh University from 1599 to 1620
- Hugo Charteris, 11th Earl of Wemyss (1857–1937), British politician
- Hugo Charteris (cricketer) (1884–1916), English cricketer
- Hugo Charteris (1922–1970), British novelist and screenwriter
- James Charteris, 13th Earl of Wemyss (born 1948), British landowner
- John Charteris (1877–1946), British army general, later a Member of Parliament
- Laura Spencer-Churchill, Duchess of Marlborough, née Charteris (1915–1990), British socialite
- Lawrence Charteris (1625–1700), Scottish minister
- Leslie Charteris (1907–1993), British author, creator of "The Saint" (Simon Templar)
- Luke Charteris (born 1983), Welsh rugby player
- Martin Charteris, Baron Charteris of Amisfield (1913–1999), British Army officer, private secretary to HM Elizabeth II
- Mary Charteris, Lady Elcho (1862–1937), English society hostess
- Lady Mary Charteris (born 1987), British fashion model, DJ, and musician
- Matthew Charteris (1840–1897), Scottish physician and academic
- Richard Charteris (1822–1874), Scottish cricketer and British Army officer
- Richard Charteris (musicologist) (born 1948), Australian musicologist
- Ruth Charteris (born 1973), Scottish advocate, Solicitor General for Scotland
- Selena Charteris (born 1981), New Zealand cricketer
- Sir Thomas Charteris (died 1346), Scottish nobleman and ambassador to England

== See also ==
- Clan Charteris
