= Lady Mary Charteris =

21st-century British model and musician

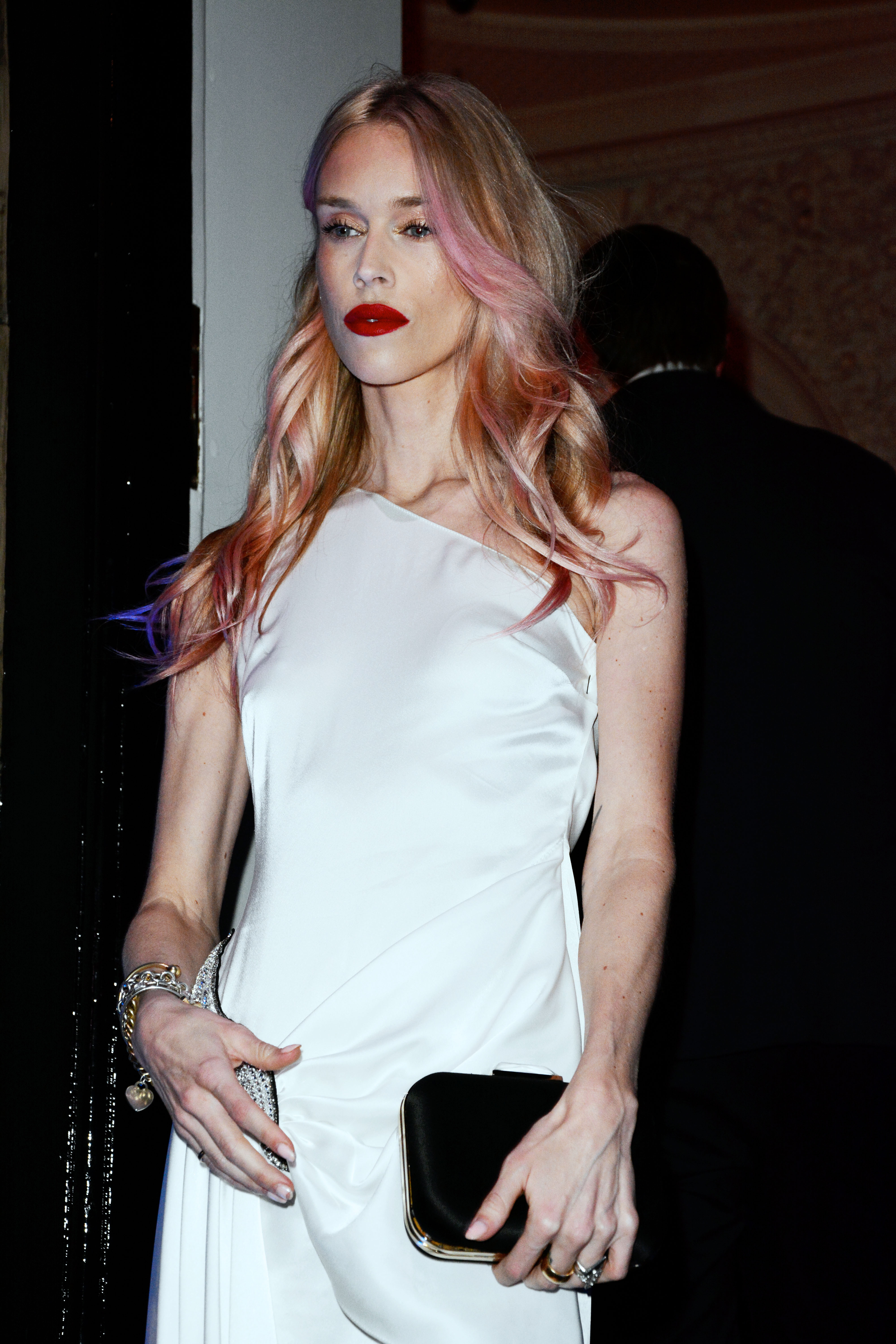
- Charteris in 2024
- Born: Mary Olivia Charteris; 23 April 1987 (age 39); Westminster, London, England
- Noble family: Charteris
- Spouse: Robbie Furze (m. 2012)
- Issue: Wilde Jessie Furze
- Father: James Charteris, 13th Earl of Wemyss and 9th Earl of March
- Mother: Catherine Ingrid Guinness
- Occupation: Model; musician; DJ

Lady Mary Olivia Charteris Furze (born 23 April 1987) is a British fashion model, DJ, musician and socialite. She was a vocalist and keyboardist in the English electronic rock band The Big Pink.

== Early life and family ==
Lady Mary Olivia Charteris was born on 23 April 1987 to James Charteris, 13th Earl of Wemyss and 9th Earl of March, and the Hon. Catherine Ingrid Guinness, a former colleague of Andy Warhol and the daughter of Jonathan Bryan Guinness, 3rd Baron Moyne. She has an older brother, Francis Richard (Dick) Charteris, Lord Elcho. Daphne Guinness is her maternal aunt. She is a member of the Scottish noble Charteris family. Her parents divorced in 1988. Her mother remarried to Robert Hesketh in 1990. In 1995 her father remarried to Amanda Feilding. She was educated at Francis Holland School in London, where she studied classical civilisation, art, and ethics.

== Career ==
=== Modelling ===
As a teenager, Charteris began modelling after Isabella Blow, a magazine editor and family friend, introduced her to the Storm Models agency. She has modelled for Louis Vuitton, Gucci, Nike, Iceberg, Philip Treacy, Markus Lupfer, Thakoon, Jason Wu, and Topshop. She has been featured in print editorials and spreads in Vogue, Vogue Italia, British Vogue, Vanity Fair, Love, Tatler, Glamour Spain, Elle Korea, L'Officiel, Flaunt, and Purple and has posed for Mario Testino, Terry Richardson, Olivier Zahm, Ellen Von Unwerth, Solve Sundsbo, David Bailey, and Michel Comte. In December 2012 Charteris was selected by Amazon UK to showcase their new collection for the launch of their premium women's fashion online store. In September 2018 Charteris walked the runway for Alice Temperley during 2019 Spring-Summer London Fashion Week.

=== Music ===
Charteris began her music career as a disc jockey, playing a fusion of retro and dance tracks at music festivals, weddings, and fashion events. She is a frequent attendee at music festivals like Glastonbury and Coachella. In June 2018 she performed as a DJ at the Cartier Queen's Cup.

==== MPRSSS ====
In January 2013 Charteris announced an electronic music project she created called MPRSSS. She was influenced by her relationship with her husband's band. She began experimenting in her husband's studio with beats and synths with different effects, which lead to the creation of MPRSSS. The video was directed by Rob Hawkins.

==== The Big Pink ====
Charteris became involved with the electronic rock band The Big Pink when she began dating her future husband, Robbie Furze. She joined the rock group on tour; selling merchandise, managing press, and assisting with stage lighting. In 2016 she joined the rock group as a keyboarder and vocalist. Charteris' first record as a member of the band, making her debut in the single Hightimes, was the EP Empire Underground which released on 4 March 2016. In 2016 she began her first tour with the band as a vocalist on their North American tour. She and Robbie Fulze also perform sets as DJs together under Big Pink and Big Pink Stripped Back.

== Personal life ==
Charteris married rock singer Robertson "Robbie" Furze in 2012 at Stanway House, her family's estate in Gloucestershire. Guests included Florence Welch, Lily Allen, Poppy Delevingne, Sean Lennon, Keira Knightley, Jerry Hall, and Georgia May Jagger. Her wedding dress, designed by Pam Hogg, was later put on exhibition at the Victoria and Albert Museum. Charteris and her husband live in Los Angeles.

Charteris has been noted for her outlandish and risque fashion sense. She is close friends with Cara Delevingne and Rita Ora, and is often photographed at high society events.

She gave birth to a daughter, Wilde Jessie, on 21 May, 2021.
