= Cambo Estate =

Historic estate in Fife, Scotland

Coordinates: 56°17′39″N 2°38′31″W

Designations

Inventory of Gardens and Designed Landscapes in Scotland
- Official name: Cambo
- Designated: 30 March 2005
- Reference no.: GDL00080

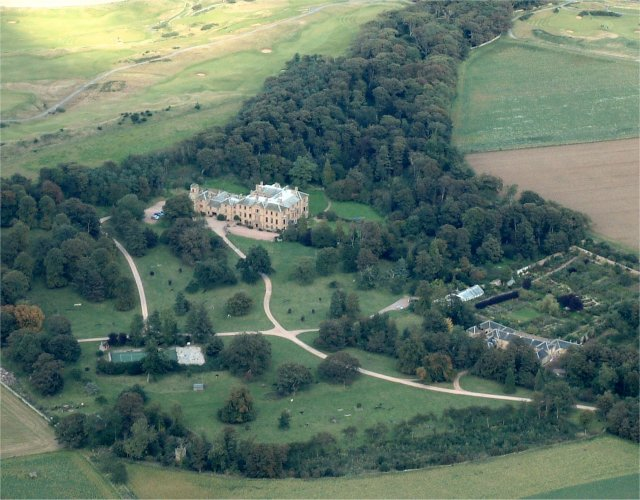
Aerial view of Cambo Estate, showing the house, woodlands and walled garden

Cambo Estate lies close to the village of Kingsbarns in north-east Fife, Scotland. It is within the East Neuk, 10 kilometres (6.2 mi) south-east of St Andrews. At the heart of the estate lies the 19th-century Cambo House, the home of Sir Peter Erskine, Bt and Lady Catherine Erskine. The gardens of Cambo are open to the public, and include the walled garden and seasonal snowdrop gardens. Elsewhere on the estate is the Kingsbarns Golf Links golf course, which co-hosts the Alfred Dunhill Links Championship every year.

== History ==
The estate of Cambo was granted to Robert de Newenham by a charter of King William the Lion. His descendants took the name "de Cambhou", and had settled in Fife by the early 14th century. Sir John de Cambhou fought at the Battle of Methven (1306), but was captured by the English and hanged at Newcastle. In 1599 the estate was granted to Thomas Myretoun.

In 1668, Sir Charles Erskine, Bt (d. 1677), the Lord Lyon King of Arms and brother of the 3rd Earl of Kellie, purchased the property from the creditors of Patrick Merton. The estate passed through the Erskine family to the 5th Earl of Kellie, who forfeited his lands after supporting the Jacobite rising of 1745. In 1759 Cambo was sold to the Charteris family, who bought it for their son who was studying at St Andrews University.

Thomas Erskine, 9th Earl of Kellie (c. 1745–1828), bought the estate back in the 1790s. A successful merchant in Sweden, he invested heavily in improving the estate, building the picturesque Georgian estate farms, and carrying out extensive land drainage. He commissioned the architect Robert Balfour to remodel the house in 1795. His descendants continued the improvement of the estate through the 19th century, laying out ornamental gardens, with a series of early cast iron bridges.

The old house comprised a tower house with numerous additions, including a first-floor conservatory. It was destroyed by fire in 1878, after a staff party when the Erskine family was away. The present house was built on the same site between 1879 and 1884, to designs by the architects Wardrop & Reid.

== The estate ==
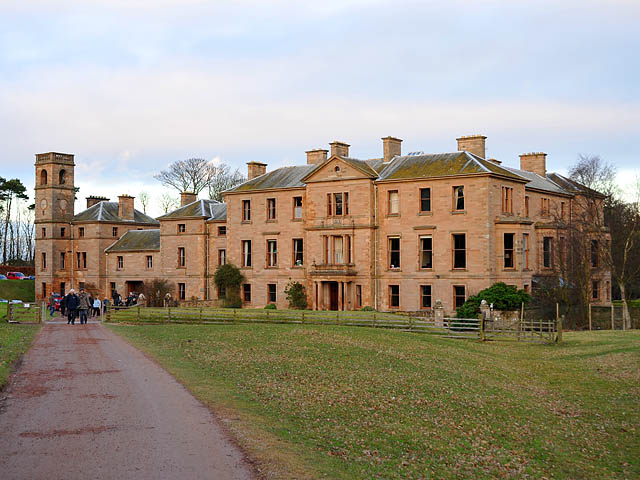
Cambo House

Cambo House is protected as a category B listed building, and the grounds are included in the Inventory of Gardens and Designed Landscapes in Scotland, the national listing of historic gardens. The house is operated as self-catering and bed & breakfast accommodation, while the walled garden, built around the Cambo Burn, and woodland gardens are open to the public year-round. The estate woodlands have a significant collection of snowdrops, including over 300 varieties of Galanthus species, that are accredited with Plant Heritage as a National Plant Collection.

Kingsbarns Golf Links was laid out in 2000 to designs by American golf course architects Kyle Phillips and Mark Parsinen. The Alfred Dunhill Links Championship, an annual pro-am golf tournament, is played in September on Kingsbarns, St Andrews Old Course, and Carnoustie.
