= Gosford House =

Country house near Longniddry in East Lothian, Scotland

Coordinates: 55.9963°N 2.8801°W

Designations

Inventory of Gardens and Designed Landscapes in Scotland
- Official name: Gosford House
- Designated: 30 June 1987
- Reference no.: GDL00200

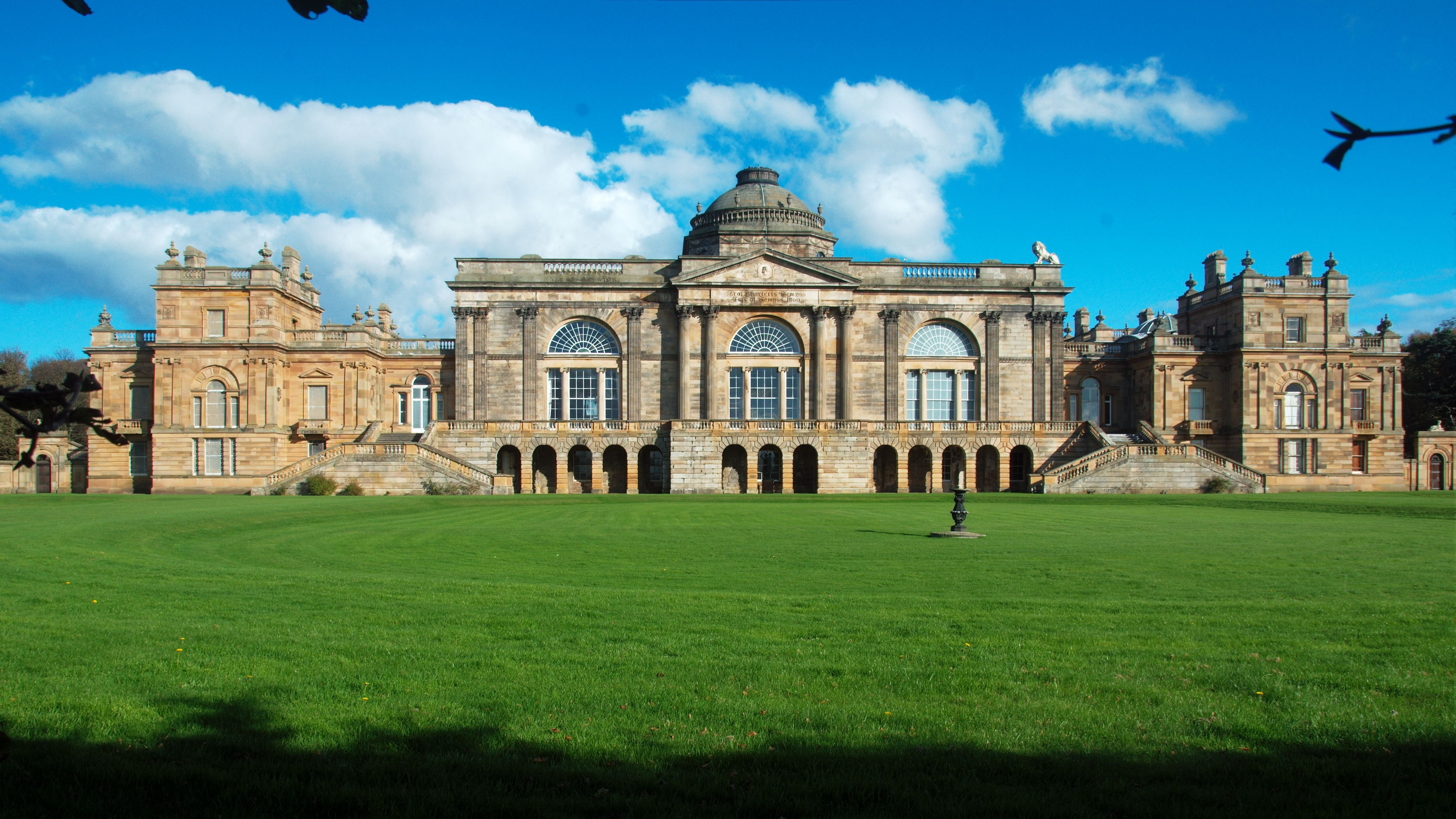
Gosford House in 2011

Gosford House is a neoclassical country house around 2 miles (3 km) northeast of Longniddry in East Lothian, Scotland, on the A198 Aberlady Road, in 5,000 acres (2,000 ha) of parkland and coast.

It is the family seat of the Charteris family, the Earls of Wemyss and March. It was the home of the late Rt. Hon. David Charteris, 12th Earl of Wemyss, chief of the name and arms of Charteris, until his death in 2008. In 2009, it was inherited by James Charteris, 13th Earl of Wemyss and March (known by the courtesy title of Lord Neidpath) although the Earl and his wife, drug researcher Amanda Feilding, reside at Stanway House in Gloucestershire. The south wing is the family home portion of the estate.

The estate, listed on 5 February 1971 as Gosford House With Screen Walls and Garden Statuary, LB6533, includes numerous listed buildings, notably the house, the stables and the mausoleum which are all Category A listed. The grounds are included in the Inventory of Gardens and Designed Landscapes in Scotland.

== History ==
Before it came into the possession of the 7th Earl of Wemyss in 1781 or 1784 (depending on the source), the property was held by the Murrays, Douglases, Sinclairs from 1458, by the Achesons from 1561, then by the Auchmutys from 1622 and then by the Wedderburn family in 1659 upon being purchased by Sir Peter Wedderburn.

Gosford was built by the 7th Earl between 1790 and 1800, to plans by the architect Robert Adam (1728–1792), who died before the house was completed. The 7th Earl is buried in the Wemyss Mausoleum on the estate. He is the only member of the family to be buried in this building, a pyramid-style structure (because of his role as Grand Master Mason of the Grand Lodge of Scotland), that is now category A listed. The 8th Earl inherited Gosford House. The property originally included the main block with flanking pavilions and colonnades. In the 1800s, damage from the damp air, aggravated by the use of sea sand, led the 8th Earl to demolish the wings. During 1830–1840, an earlier house on the property was rebuilt beside the stables. It was subsequently demolished.

In 1891, 10th Earl, rebuilt the wings to designs by the architect William Young. The south wing contains the marble hall.

== In the 20th and 21st centuries ==
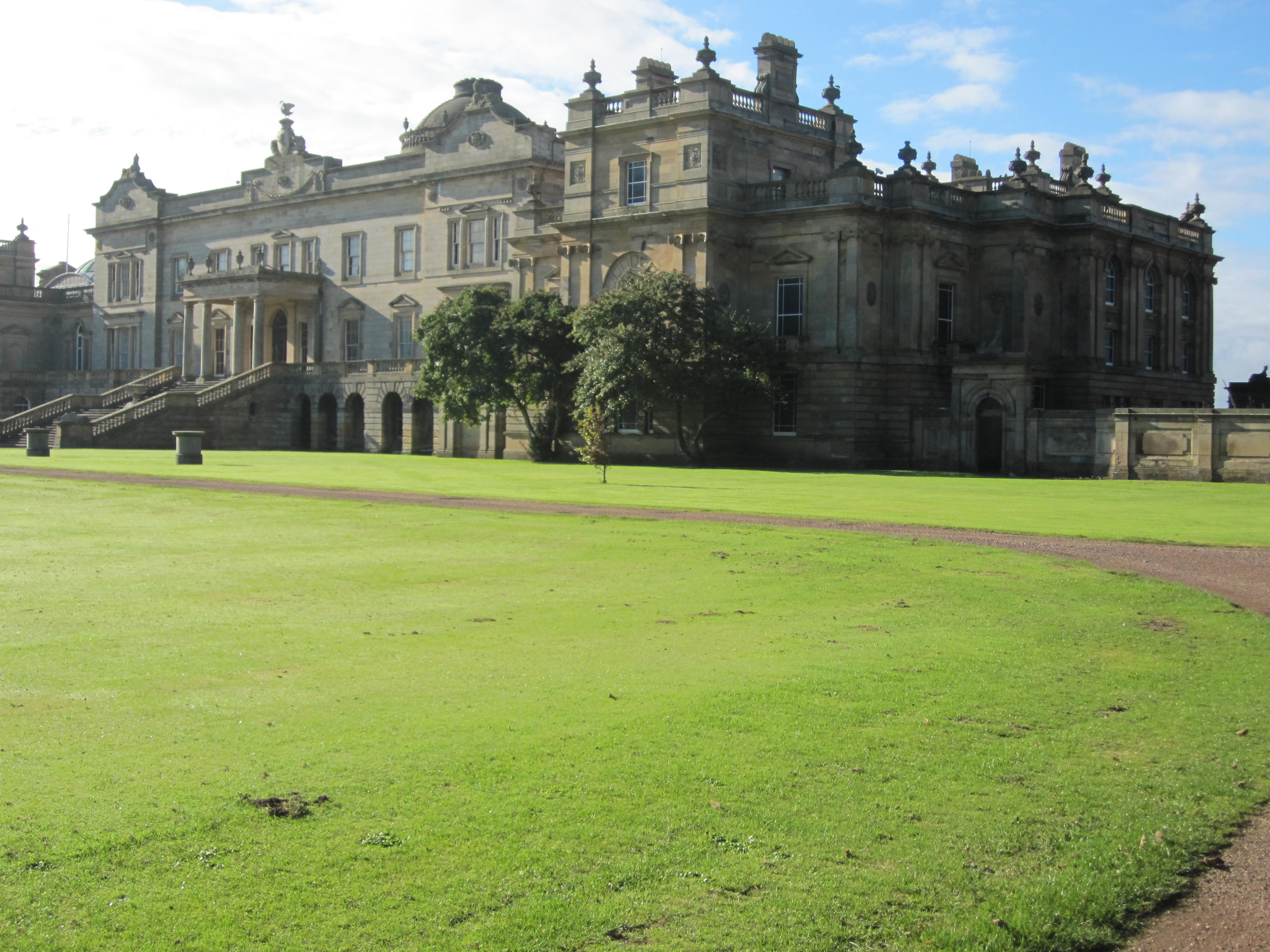
Gosford House from the south

Between the two great wars, the House was used as a hotel. During World War II, the British Army occupied the house, during which time part of the centre block was damaged by fire resulting from a party. Subsequent dry rot led to the roof being partly removed. It was re-roofed in 1987, and restoration of the central block is an ongoing process, which was progressed by Shelagh, Dowager Countess of Wemyss and March. The ponds in the policies were restored by James Charteris, 13th Earl of Wemyss who took over the family estate and title in December 2008 when his father died. Gosford can be seen from Edinburgh on a clear day. It is open to the public in the summer. The grounds contain an unusual and rare example of a Scottish curling house.

A February 1971 report provided this summary of the House at the time:

Classical double pile mansion, 2-storey with basement. William Young replaced Adam's pavilions with Baroque pavilion wings 1891, and reorientated entrance to S, added arcaded loggia to E and W elevations. Polished yellow ashlar with base course, channelled basement, impost course, full entablature with moulded cornice, blocking course with balustraded sections and decorative urns. Moulded architraves, lugged or pedimented windows to principal floors.... The house contains a remarkable, extensive collection of paintings and porcelain.

Additional specifics about the interior in 2015 are provided by a Historic Houses publication

Inside, the building exceeds the expectations raised by its elegant exterior. The Marble Hall, in the south wing, is arguably the most arresting of its many fine features. It was completed in 1891 by William Young for the tenth Earl of Wemyss and rises to a height of three storeys, with a magnificent double staircase leading to a surrounding picture gallery. The elaborate fireplace, alabaster colonnades and ornate plasterwork reflect the strong Italianate taste of the tenth Earl, while the Palladian screen of Venetian windows are reminiscent of Adam’s original designs.

The 13th Earl has authorized conservation work, partly to repair damage caused while the property was used by the Army.

Several film productions have utilized the site, including the 2000 film House of Mirth, directed by Terence Davies and based on the novel by Edith Wharton, and the second and third season of Outlander, the Starz! Network television series based on the novels by Diana Gabaldon. The house also appeared in the ghost film The Awakening, starring Rebecca Hall.

== See also ==
- List of places in East Lothian
- List of castles in Scotland
