= Catherine Guinness =

British aristocrat, writer, and socialite

The Honourable Catherine Guinness
- Born: Catherine Ingrid Guinness; 1 June 1952 (age 74)
- Other names: Catherine Charteris, Lady Neidpath; Catherine Hesketh
- Occupations: writer, socialite
- Spouses: James Charteris, Lord Neidpath (m. 1983; div. 1988) Robert Fleetwood Hesketh (m. 1990; died 2004)
- Children: 5 (including Lady Mary Charteris)
- Parent(s): Jonathan Guinness, 3rd Baron Moyne; Ingrid Wyndham
- Relatives: Guinness family

Catherine Ingrid Guinness (born 1 June 1952), known as Catherine Charteris, Lady Neidpath from 1983 to 1990 and later as Catherine Hesketh, is a British aristocrat, writer, and socialite. The first child of Jonathan Guinness, 3rd Baron Moyne, she is a member of the prominent Guinness family and a granddaughter of Diana Mitford. Guinness was a close friend of Pop artist Andy Warhol, for whom she worked as an editor for Interview magazine at the Factory, and was active in the New York social scene.

== Early life and family ==
The Honourable Catherine Ingrid Guinness was born on 1 June 1952 in Oxford to Jonathan Bryan Guinness, 3rd Baron Moyne, and Ingrid Georgia Olivia Wyndham. Her father was a member of the Guinness family, a wealthy and politically prominent Irish family that made a fortune from brewing and banking. Her mother was a member of the Wyndham family and a descendant of George Wyndham, 1st Baron Leconfield. Her paternal grandparents were the poet and novelist Bryan Guinness, 2nd Baron Moyne, and the socialite Diana Mitford, who was one of the infamous Mitford sisters. Her maternal grandparents were Major Guy Richard Charles Wyndham MC, the son of Lieutenant-Colonel Guy Wyndham, and Grethe Wulfsberg, a Norwegian woman. Guinness' parents divorced in 1963, after which her mother remarried to Lord Moyne's cousin, Henry Paul Guinness Channon, Baron Kelvedon. She is the half-sister of Daphne Guinness.

Guinness studied philosophy at Trinity College in Dublin.

== Career ==
In 1975, Guinness was photographed by Robert Mapplethorpe in London. The photo is now in the collection of the Los Angeles County Museum of Art. Another photograph by Mapplethorpe, taken in New York in 1976, is now owned by the J. Paul Getty Museum.

In 1976, Guinness began working for Pop artist Andy Warhol's magazine Interview and became one of his close associates. She frequently accompanied Warhol on assignments and conducted interviews with numerous celebrities, including Michael Jackson, the Rolling Stones, Dustin Hoffman, and Douglas Kirkland. Through her work with Interview and her friendship with Warhol, she was an active participant in the Factory milieu and New York's social scene. In the 1980s, she spent less time in New York but continued to work for Interview magazine as a contributing editor.

In the late 1970s, Guinness also worked with Anna Wintour as an editor at Viva magazine.

In 1980, Guinness briefly worked for investment banker Richard Weisman.

In 1984, Guinness co-wrote the book The House of Mitford with her father, a biography and genealogy of his mother's family, the English aristocratic Mitford family.

== Personal life ==
Guinness was a close friend of Charles, Prince of Wales, and was active in the London social scene.

In 1978, Guinness was romantically involved with drug smuggler Tom Sullivan, whom she met at the nightclub Studio 54.

In July 1983, Guinness married James Donald Charteris, Lord Neidpath, the son and heir of David Charteris, 12th Earl of Wemyss. For the wedding, Guinness wore a gown designed by Halston and assumed the courtesy title Lady Neidpath. Although she had hoped that Warhol would attend the ceremony, he did not. The couple resided at Stanway House, the Charteris family's 17th-century manor in Gloucestershire. They had two children, Francis Richard Charteris, Lord Elcho and Lady Mary Charteris, before divorcing in 1988.

In 1990, Guinness married her second husband, Robert Fleetwood Hesketh, the son of Colonel Roger Feetwood-Hesketh and his wife Lady Mary Lumley, eldest daughter of the 11th Earl of Scarbrough. They had three children before he died from a drug overdose in November 2004. Hesketh's 1,600-acre estate in Churchtown was inherited by their son, Frank.
