= Cutsdean Quarry =

Nature reserve in Gloucestershire, England

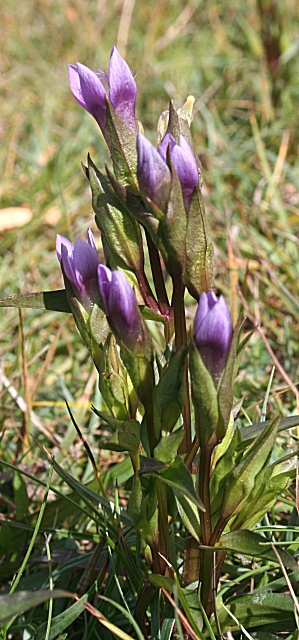
- Example – autumn gentian (Gentianella amarella)

- Location within Gloucestershire
- Interactive map of Cutsdean Quarry
- Type: Gloucestershire Wildlife Trust nature reserve
- Location: near Temple Guiting
- Coordinates: 51°58′56.32″N 1°50′52.07″W
- Area: 2.05 acres (0.83 ha)
- Created: 1981
- Operator: Gloucestershire Wildlife Trust Stanway Estate
- Status: Open all year

Cutsdean Quarry (grid reference SP105315) is a 0.83-hectare (2.1-acre) nature reserve in Gloucestershire, England. The site is listed in the 'Cotswold District' Local Plan 2001–2011 as a Key Wildlife Site (KWS).

The site is managed by the Gloucestershire Wildlife Trust under licence from the Stanway Estate since 1981.

== Location and habitat ==
The quarry is sited in the north Cotswolds. It is at Heaver Cross-roads and is about two miles to the north-east of Temple Guiting. Records have not been located on the full age of the quarry. It is, however, shown on an 1865 Stanway Estate map when it was smaller being one acre. The first edition Ordnance Survey map of 1883 shows its size had increased.

The quarry is one of many similar sites in the area. These produced Chipping Norton limestone or slate for Cotswold roofing tiles. Cutsdean quarry was used to produce limestone. It is now disused and has been allowed to colonise naturally. This has resulted in habitats on scree, grassland and scrub.

== Flora ==
Plants which grow on the western scree include pyramidal orchid, autumna gentian and wild mignonette. The areas of the quarry which are now grassed support tor-grass and upright brome mixed with other species. These include fairy flax, harebell, dropwort, field scabious, lady's bedstraw, quaking-grass and woolly thistle. It is recorded that the bare limestone rubble, which is on the face of the main excavation area, used to support the rare perfoliate or Cotswold pennycress. This has not been seen for some time.

Gorse flourishes on this site. Bramble and elder scrub grow on the eastern side of the site. There is cow parsley, common nettle and rosebay willowherb.

== Fauna ==
Birds recordings are good for this habitat and include linnet, whitethroat, tree pipit and the greenfinch. Sightings of the Duke of Burgundy butterfly are recorded here, as are populations of ringlet, large skipper and marbled white.

This quarry is an area for basking adders.

== Conservation ==
The grassland is cut annually to encourage wildflower growth and to prevent invasion by dominant grasses. Hawthorn and bramble spread is controlled.

== Publications ==
- Kelham, A, Sanderson, J, Doe, J, Edgeley-Smith, M, et al., 1979, 1990, 2002 editions, 'Nature Reserves of the Gloucestershire Trust for Nature Conservation/Gloucestershire Wildlife Trust'
- 'Nature Reserve Guide – discover the wild Gloucestershire on your doorstep' – 50th Anniversary, January 2011, Gloucestershire Wildlife Trust
