= Archer Windsor-Clive =

English cricketer and British Army officer

Personal information
- Full name: Archer Windsor-Clive
- Born: 6 November 1890; Redditch, Worcestershire, England
- Died: 24 August 1914 (aged 23); Landrecies, Nord, France
- Batting: Left-handed
- Bowling: Left-arm medium
- Relatives: Robert Windsor-Clive (father); Hugo Charteris (brother-in-law)

Domestic team information
- Years: Team
- 1908–1912: Glamorgan
- 1910–1912: Cambridge University

Career statistics
Competition	First-class
Matches	7
Runs scored	108
Batting average	8.30
100s/50s	0/0
Top score	22
Balls bowled	467
Wickets	3
Bowling average	72.33
5 wickets in innings	0
10 wickets in match	0
Best bowling	3/56
Catches/stumpings	1/–
- Source: Cricinfo, 19 June 2019

Archer Windsor-Clive (6 November 1890 – 25 August 1914) was an English first-class cricketer and British Army officer. Windsor-Clive played first-class cricket for Cambridge University between 1910 and 1912. He served in the First World War with the Coldstream Guards and was killed in action on 25 August 1914. He was the first first-class cricketer to be killed in the war.

== Life and military career ==
Windsor-Clive was born at Hewell Grange near Redditch to Robert Windsor-Clive, 1st Earl of Plymouth, and his wife, Alberta Victoria Sarah Caroline. He was educated at Eton College, where he played for the college cricket team from 1907 to 1909. From there he went up to Trinity College, Cambridge. While studying at Cambridge he made his debut in first-class cricket for Cambridge University against Essex at Fenner's in 1910. He played first-class cricket for Cambridge until 1912, making seven appearances. In his seven matches, he scored 108 runs with a high score of 22, while with his left-arm medium pace bowling he took 3 wickets with best figures of 3 for 56. In addition to playing first-class cricket, Windsor-Clive played minor counties cricket for Glamorgan between 1908 and 1912, making four appearances in the Minor Counties Championship.

He was commissioned as a second lieutenant in the Territorial Force. In December 1913, he was transferred from the Territorial Force to the Coldstream Guards, at which point he was promoted to the rank of lieutenant. Shortly after the beginning of hostilities in the First World War, Windsor-Clive left for France with the 3rd Battalion aboard the SS Cawdor Castle on 12 August 1914. The battalion soon reached Harveng in Belgium, where they set up defensive positions. The following day the allied Retreat from Mons began. The Coldstream Guards fell back to Landrecies, where they defended the north-western sector of the town. At some point between 19:00 and 20:00 on 25 August 1914, Windsor-Clive was killed by a German shell, which also killed his batman, Frank Lethbridge. He was the first first-class cricketer to fall in the war. His body was recovered and he was buried at the Landrecies Communal Cemetery. His brother-in-law, Hugo Charteris, was also a first-class cricketer.
