= James Mackay, Baron Mackay of Clashfern =

British lawyer and peer (1927–2026)

The Right Honourable The Lord Mackay of Clashfern KT PC FRSE
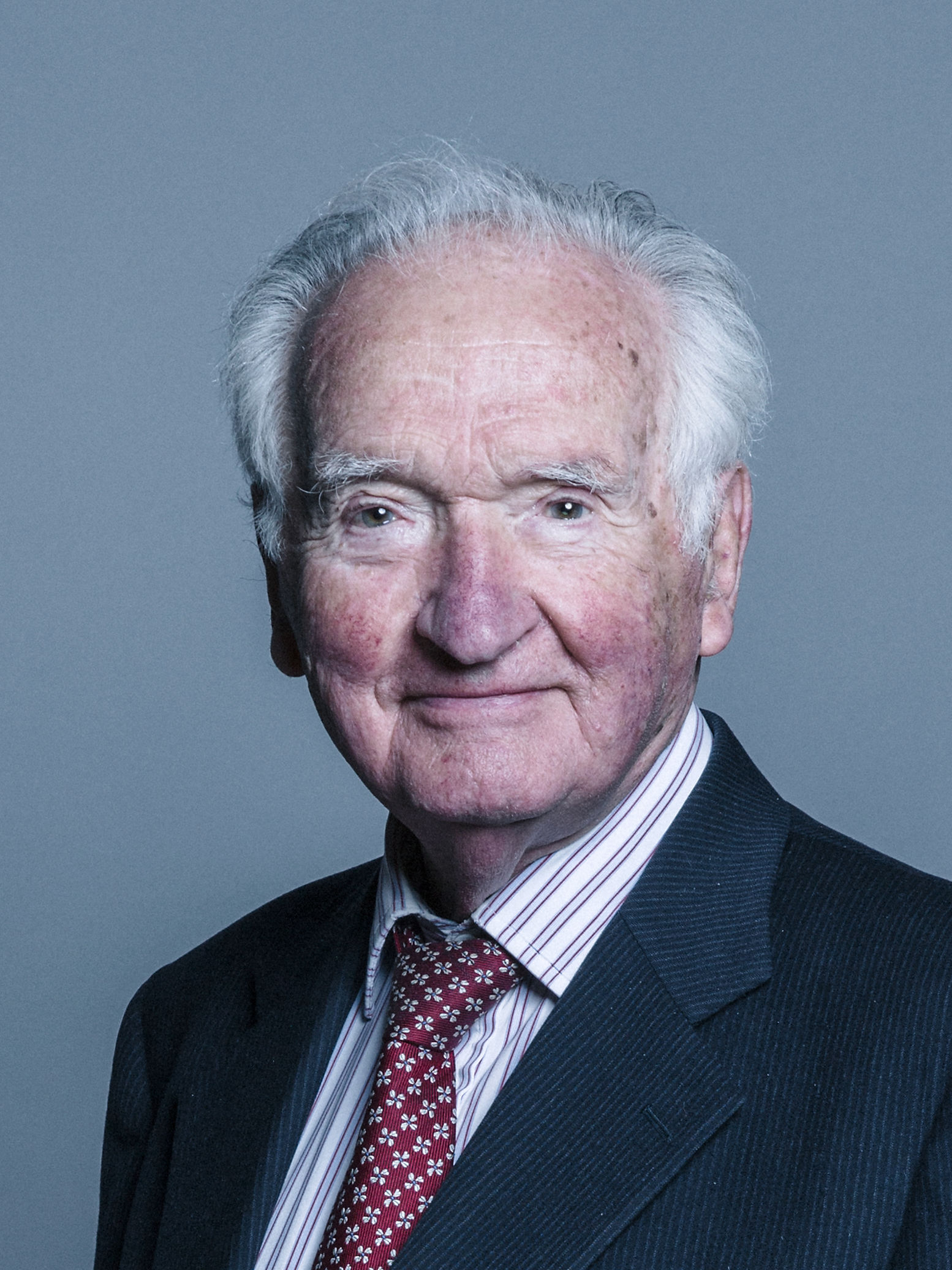
- Official portrait, 2018

Lord Clerk Register
- In office 27 April 2007 – November 2022
- Monarchs: Elizabeth II; Charles III
- Preceded by: The Earl of Wemyss
- Succeeded by: Lady Elish Angiolini

Shadow Lord Chancellor
- In office 2 May 1997 – 11 June 1997
- Leader: John Major
- Preceded by: The Lord Irvine of Lairg
- Succeeded by: The Lord Kingsland

Lord Chancellor
- In office 28 October 1987 – 2 May 1997
- Monarch: Elizabeth II
- Prime Minister: Margaret Thatcher; John Major
- Preceded by: The Lord Havers
- Succeeded by: The Lord Irvine of Lairg

Lord of Appeal in Ordinary
- In office 1 October 1985 – 28 October 1987
- Preceded by: The Lord Fraser of Tullybelton
- Succeeded by: The Lord Jauncey of Tullichettle

Lord Advocate
- In office 5 May 1979 – 16 May 1984
- Prime Minister: Margaret Thatcher
- Preceded by: Ronald King Murray
- Succeeded by: The Lord Cameron of Lochbroom

Member of the House of Lords
- Lord Temporal
- Life peerage 6 July 1979 – 22 July 2022

Personal details
- Born: 2 July 1927 Edinburgh, Scotland
- Died: 7 July 2026 (aged 99)
- Party: Conservative
- Spouse: Elizabeth Hymers (m. 1958)
- Education: University of Edinburgh; Trinity College, Cambridge

James Peter Hymers Mackay, Baron Mackay of Clashfern (2 July 1927 – 7 July 2026) was a British lawyer. He served as Dean of the Faculty of Advocates, Lord Advocate, and Lord Chancellor (1987–1997). He was an active member of the House of Lords, where he sat as a Conservative; Mackay retired from the House on 22 July 2022.

== Early life and education ==
Mackay was born in Edinburgh on 2 July 1927. He was the son of railway signalman James Mackay and his wife Janet Hymers. They were both from the far north of Scotland, with his father originally coming from the farm of Claisfearn near Tarbet in Sutherland, and his mother coming from Caithness. He grew up as an only child, and his family were devout members of the Free Presbyterian Church of Scotland.

Having won a scholarship, he was educated at George Heriot's School, an independent school in Edinburgh. He then studied mathematics and physics at the University of Edinburgh, receiving a joint undergraduate Master of Arts (MA Hons) degree in 1948. Mackay taught mathematics for two years at the University of St Andrews. He then moved to Trinity College, Cambridge, on a scholarship, from which he obtained a Bachelor of Arts (BA) degree in mathematics in 1952. He returned to Scotland, studying law at the University of Edinburgh, and graduated with a Bachelor of Laws (LLB) degree with distinction in 1955.

== Career ==
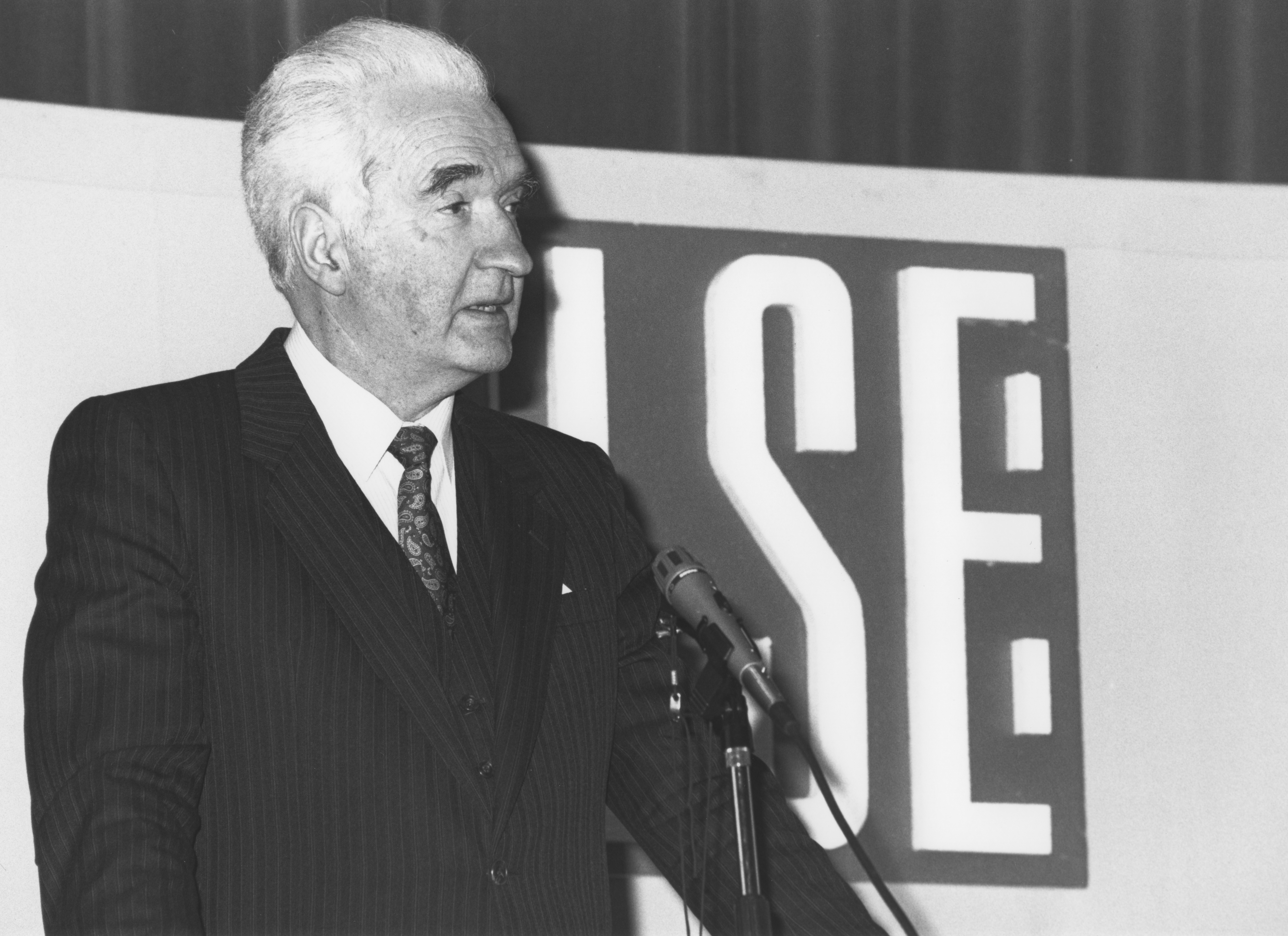
Mackay giving a public lecture at LSE in 1989

Mackay was elected to the Faculty of Advocates in 1955. He was appointed a Queen's Counsel in 1965. He was Sheriff Principal for Renfrew and Argyll from 1972 to 1974. In 1973 he became vice-dean of the Faculty on Advocates and from 1976 until 1979 served as its dean, the leader of the Scots bar.

In 1979, Mackay was appointed Lord Advocate, the senior law officer in Scotland, and was created a life peer as Baron Mackay of Clashfern, of Eddrachillis in the District of Sutherland; he took his territorial designation from his father's birthplace, a cottage beside Loch na Claise Fearna (located next to the A894 between Scourie and Laxford Bridge). After his retirement as Lord Advocate in 1984, Mackay was active in the House of Lords until 22 July 2022. His final contribution was during a debate on Seafarers' Wages Bill on 20 July 2022.

He served as Lord of Appeal in Ordinary for two years between 1985 and 1987, and as Lord Chancellor for a decade after. He was also Commissary to the University of Cambridge in the period between 2003 and 2016. He was the editor-in-chief of Halsbury's Laws of England, the major legal work which states the law of England, first published in 1907; the post is usually held by a former Lord Chancellor.

== Personal life ==
=== Family and religion ===
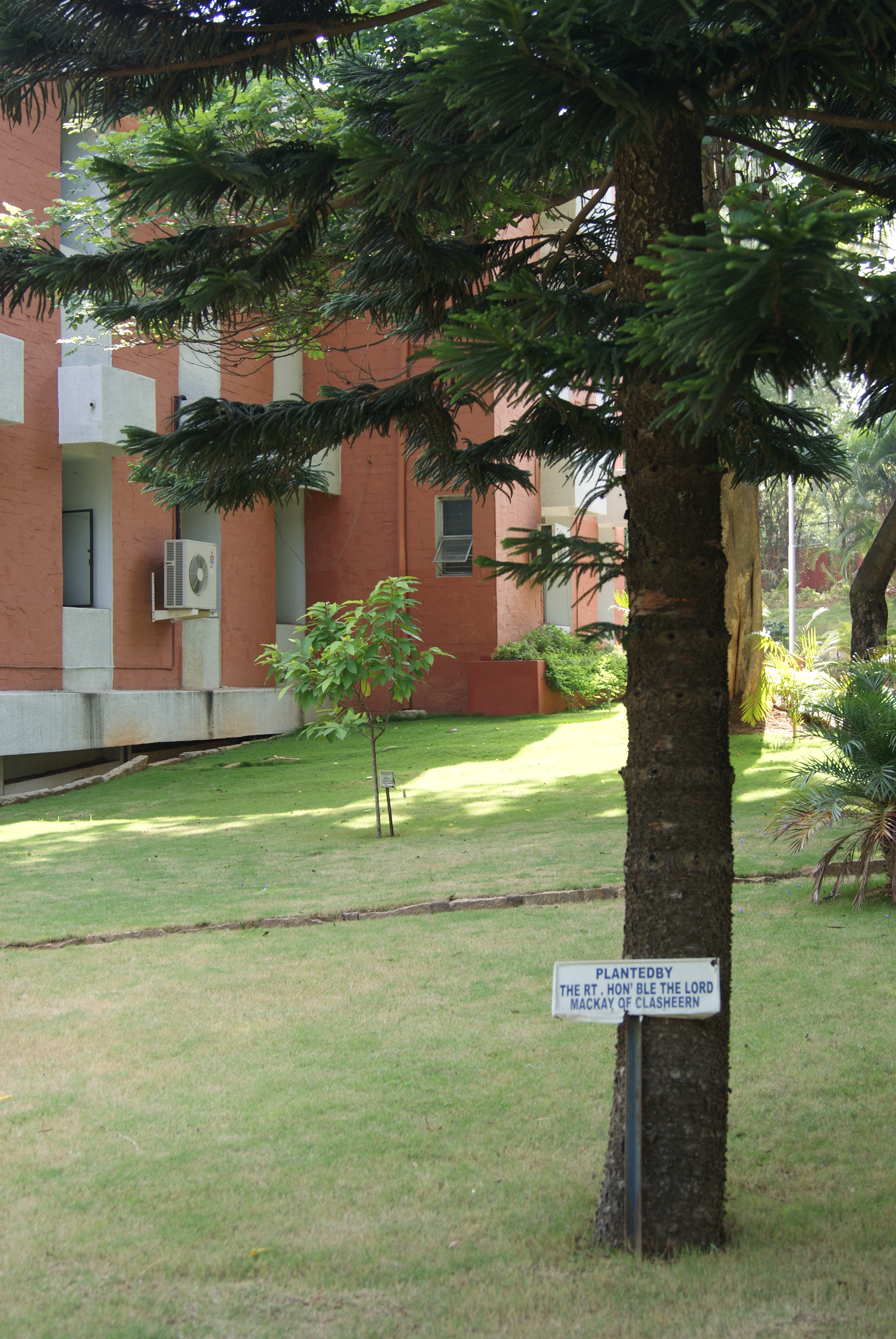
A tree planted in the grounds of the National Law School of India University in Bangalore by Lord Mackay of Clashfern

Mackay married Elizabeth Gunn Hymers, of Halkirk, in 1958. They had a son, James, and two daughters, Elizabeth and Shona, as well as several grandchildren and great-grandchildren.

Mackay was raised a member of the Free Presbyterian Church of Scotland; as an adult he was an elder of the church. The church forbids its members to attend Catholic religious services; nevertheless Mackay attended two Catholic funeral Masses for members of the judiciary (for Charles Ritchie Russell in 1986, and again for John Wheatley in 1988). Following the second Mass Mackay was called before a church synod where he denied that he had broken the church's prohibition of showing "support for the doctrine of Catholicism", saying "I went there purely with the purpose of paying my respects to my dead colleagues." The church suspended Mackay from the eldership and from membership. The synod met again in Glasgow in 1989 to review the decision; the meeting asked Mackay to undertake not to attend further Catholic services, but he announced "I have no intention of giving any such undertaking as that for which the synod has asked", and later withdrew from the church. The dispute precipitated a schism, leading to the formation of the Associated Presbyterian Churches. Mackay did not join the new communion, but as of 1993 worshipped with their Inverness congregation. While on duties in London, he was also a regular worshipper at All Souls Church, Langham Place, a conservative evangelical church within the Church of England.

As a Presbyterian, Mackay was a firm believer in moderation. At a gathering for the Faculty of Advocates, Mackay had laid on a spread of tea and toast, complete with a tiny pot of honey. One of the lawyers in attendance contemplated the pot and remarked, "I see your Lordship keeps a bee." Mackay was also the Honorary President of the Scottish Bible Society until his death. He supported the society's programme to send a Bible to every law court in Scotland and wrote in support of "The Bible in Scots Law", a pamphlet it distributed to Scottish lawyers which described the Bible as a "foundational source book for Scotland's legal system". He was a strict sabbatarian, refusing to work or travel on a Sunday, or even to give an interview if there was a chance it could be rebroadcast on the sabbath.

=== Death ===
Mackay died at home on 7 July 2026, at the age of 99. He was survived by his wife, Elizabeth ("Bett"), as well as children, grandchildren and great-grandchildren. A North Memorial Service took place on Wednesday 15 July at 11.30am at Kingsview Christian Centre, Inverness, which is the Inverness branch of the APC denomination. His Funeral Service took place on 23 July at St. Giles' Cathedral, in Edinburgh, followed by his interment in Dean Cemetery.

== Honours and arms ==
Styles of The Lord Mackay of Clashfern
- Reference style: His Lordship
- Spoken style: Your Lordship
- Alternative style: Sir

Mackay was appointed a Knight of the Thistle by Queen Elizabeth II on 27 November 1997. In 2007, the Queen appointed him to the office of Lord Clerk Register, replacing David Charteris, 12th Earl of Wemyss. He retired from this office in November 2022, and was succeeded by Lady Elish Angiolini. He became a fellow of the Royal Society of Edinburgh in 1984. In 1989, he was elected honorary fellow of Trinity College, Cambridge. He received an honorary doctorate from Heriot-Watt University in 1990.

He was awarded an honorary degree (Doctor of Laws) by the University of Bath in 1994 and by Northumbria University in 2017.

Coat of arms of James Mackay, Baron Mackay of Clashfern
Coronet Coronet of a Baron Crest A Dexter Arm couped at the Elbow proper the hand grasping a Pair of Balances Or Escutcheon Azure on a Chevron Argent between two Bears' Heads couped Argent muzzled Gules in chief and a Fleece Argent in base a Roebuck's Head erased between two Hands grasping Daggers the points turned towards the buck's head all proper Supporters Dexter: a Male Figure attired in the Robes of the Lord High Chancellor; Sinister: a Male Figure attired in the Robes of one of Her Majesty's Counsel learned in the Law in Scotland proper Motto Manu Justi (With the hand of a just man) Orders Order of the Thistle

Legal offices
Preceded by Ronald Murray	Lord Advocate; 1979–1984	Succeeded by The Lord Cameron of Lochbroom
Political offices
Preceded by The Lord Havers	Lord High Chancellor of Great Britain; 1987–1997	Succeeded by The Lord Irvine of Lairg
Preceded by The Lord Irvine of Lairg	Shadow Lord Chancellor; 1997	Succeeded by The Lord Kingsland
Preceded by The Earl of Wemyss	Lord Clerk Register; 2007–2022	Succeeded by Elish Angiolini
