= Kenneth Cameron, Baron Cameron of Lochbroom =

Scottish judge (1931–2025)

The Right Honourable The Lord Cameron of Lochbroom PC FRSE

Member of the House of Lords
- Lord Temporal
- Life peerage 8 June 1984 – 21 April 2016

Personal details
- Born: Kenneth John Cameron; 11 June 1931
- Died: 28 January 2025 (aged 93)
- Education: Corpus Christi College, Oxford; University of Edinburgh

Kenneth John Cameron, Baron Cameron of Lochbroom PC FRSE (11 June 1931 – 28 January 2025) was a Scottish judge who served as Lord Advocate from 1984 to 1989.

== Early life ==
Kenneth Cameron was the son of John Cameron, Lord Cameron (1900–1996), a Senator of the College of Justice.

Born in Edinburgh, he was educated at Edinburgh Academy, at Corpus Christi College, Oxford and at the University of Edinburgh.

== Judicial career ==
Cameron became an Advocate in 1958 and Queen's Counsel in 1972. He was appointed President of the Pensions Appeal Tribunal for Scotland in 1976, and Chairman of the Committee of Investigation under the Agricultural Marketing Act 1958 in 1980.

=== Lord Advocate ===
Cameron was an Advocate Depute from 1981 and was appointed Lord Advocate in 1984, one of the Great Officers of State of Scotland, when he was also created a life peer as Baron Cameron of Lochbroom, of Loch Broom in the District of Ross and Cromarty, and a Privy Counsellor in 1984. He retired from the Lords on 21 April 2016.

== Retirement and death ==
Lord Cameron of Lochbroom held office as Lord Advocate until 1989 when he was appointed a Senator of the College of Justice.

Cameron died on 28 January 2025, at the age of 93.

== Other interests ==
From 1979 to 1983, while still a QC, Cameron served as chairman of the influential Edinburgh conservationist organisation the Cockburn Association, a position his father Lord Cameron held from 1955 to 1968. In 1996, by then as Lord Cameron, he served as President of the Cockburn Association until he demitted this office in 2010.

Lord Cameron of Lochbroom was Chairman of the Royal Fine Art Commission for Scotland from 1995 until its abolition in 2005, and was a Fellow of the Royal Society of Edinburgh. He was later the Honorary President of Edinburgh University Sports Union.

== Arms ==
Coat of arms of Kenneth Cameron, Baron Cameron of Lochbroom
Coronet Coronet of a baron Crest A Kittiwake alighting wings expanded proper Escutcheon Gules three Bars Or overall two Flaunches Ermine at the honour point also overall a Fleur-de-lys Sable, a Label of three points for difference Motto Et Regi Et Legi Servire

== Sources ==
- Who's Who in Scotland, 2009

Legal offices
Preceded by Lord Mackay of Clashfern	Lord Advocate; 1984–1989	Succeeded by Lord Fraser of Carmyllie
Orders of precedence in the United Kingdom
Preceded by The Lord Mackay of Clashfern	Gentlemen; Baron Cameron of Lochbroom	Followed by The Lord Vinson
