= Landrecies =

- Commune
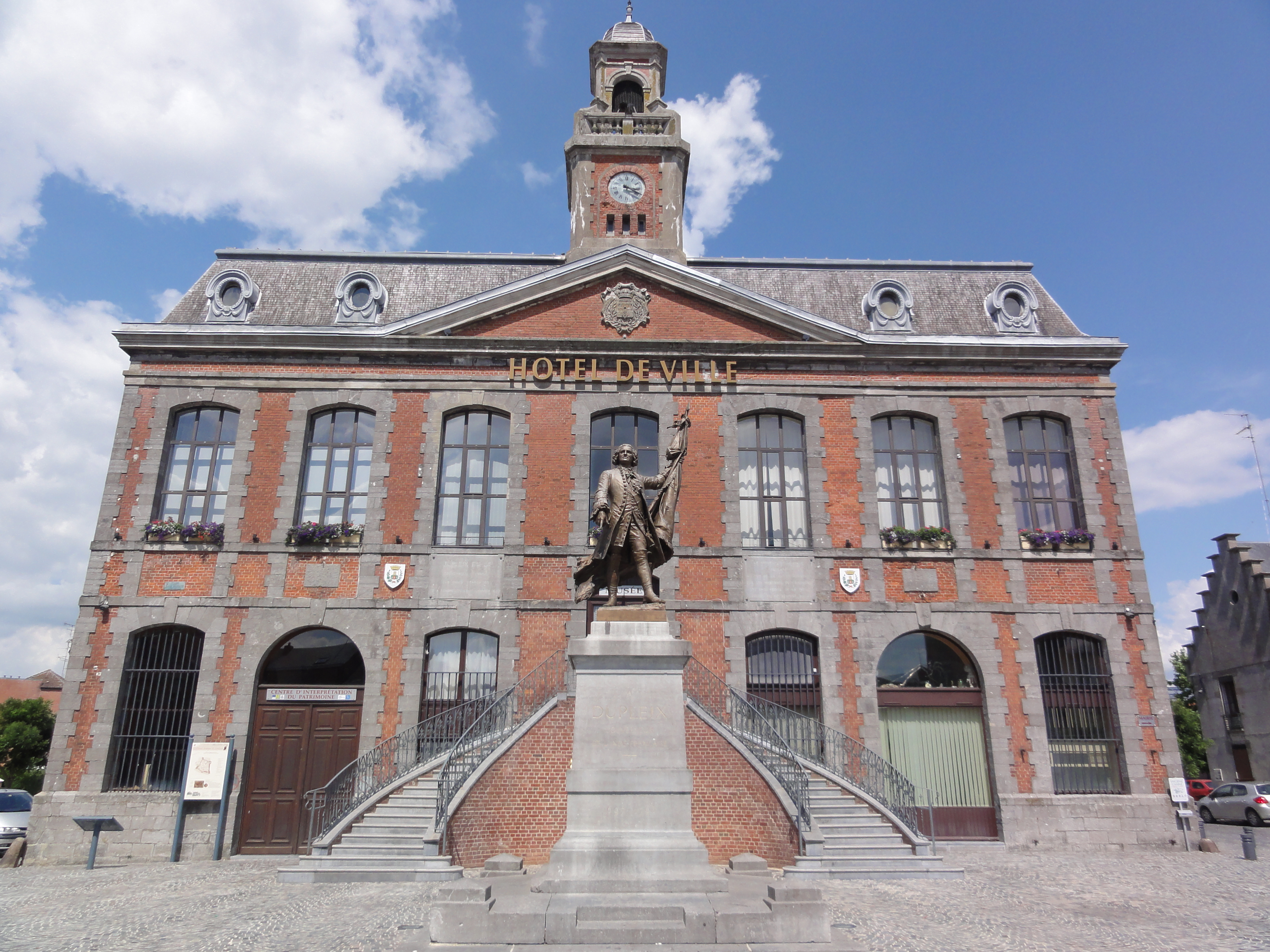
- The town hall

- Coat of arms
- Location of Landrecies
- Location within France Location within Hauts-de-France
- Coordinates: 50°07′29″N 3°41′22″E
- Country: France
- Region: Hauts-de-France
- Department: Nord
- Arrondissement: Avesnes-sur-Helpe
- Canton: Avesnes-sur-Helpe
- Intercommunality: CC Pays de Mormal

Government
  - Mayor (2020–2026): François Erlem
- Area^{1}: 21.70 km^{2} (8.38 sq mi)
- Elevation: 130 m (430 ft)
- Highest elevation: 179 m (587 ft)
- Lowest elevation: 110 m (360 ft)
- Population (2023): 3,407
  - Density: 157.0/km^{2} (406.6/sq mi)
- Demonym: Landreciens
- Time zone: UTC+01:00 (CET)
  - Summer (DST): UTC+02:00 (CEST)
- INSEE/Postal code: 59331 /59550
- Website: landrecies.com
- ^{1} French Land Register data, which excludes lakes, ponds, glaciers > 1 km^{2} (0.386 sq mi or 247 acres) and river estuaries.

Landrecies (French pronunciation: [lɑ̃dʁəsi]; Dutch: Landeschie) is a commune in the Nord department in northern France.

== History ==
In 1543, Landrecies was besieged by English and Imperial forces, who were repulsed by the French defenders. In 1794, it was besieged by Dutch forces, who captured it. It was the site of a skirmish between the British I Corps under Douglas Haig and the German First Army on 25 August 1914, that resulted in the death of Archer Windsor-Clive, the first first-class cricketer to fall in World War I.

== Population ==
Historical population
Year	Pop.	±% p.a.
1968	4,720	—
1975	4,451	−0.83%
1982	4,146	−1.01%
1990	3,941	−0.63%
1999	3,858	−0.24%
2007	3,663	−0.65%
2012	3,516	−0.82%
2017	3,483	−0.19%
2023	3,407	−0.37%
Source: INSEE

== Heraldry ==
Arms of Landrecies	The arms of Landrecies are blazoned : Azure, a triple towered castle open Or, on a base 3 medals on the colours of their respective ribbons 1: Croix de Guerre 1914-1918; 2: a Légion d'honneur; and 3: a Croix de Guerre 1939-1945

== People ==
- hometown of former Tour de France director Jean-Marie Leblanc.
- birthplace of Joseph François Dupleix, known as the conqueror of India for Louis XIV, king of France.
- birthplace of André Bonnaire, mayor of the town who represented the Radical Party in the National Assembly from 1956 to 1958.

== See also ==
- Communes of the Nord department
