= André Bonnaire =

French politician

André Bonnaire (1 February 1901, Landrecies – 21 July 1962) was a French politician. He represented the Radical Party in the National Assembly from 1956 to 1958.
