= Kingsbarns Golf Links =

Golf course in Fife, Scotland

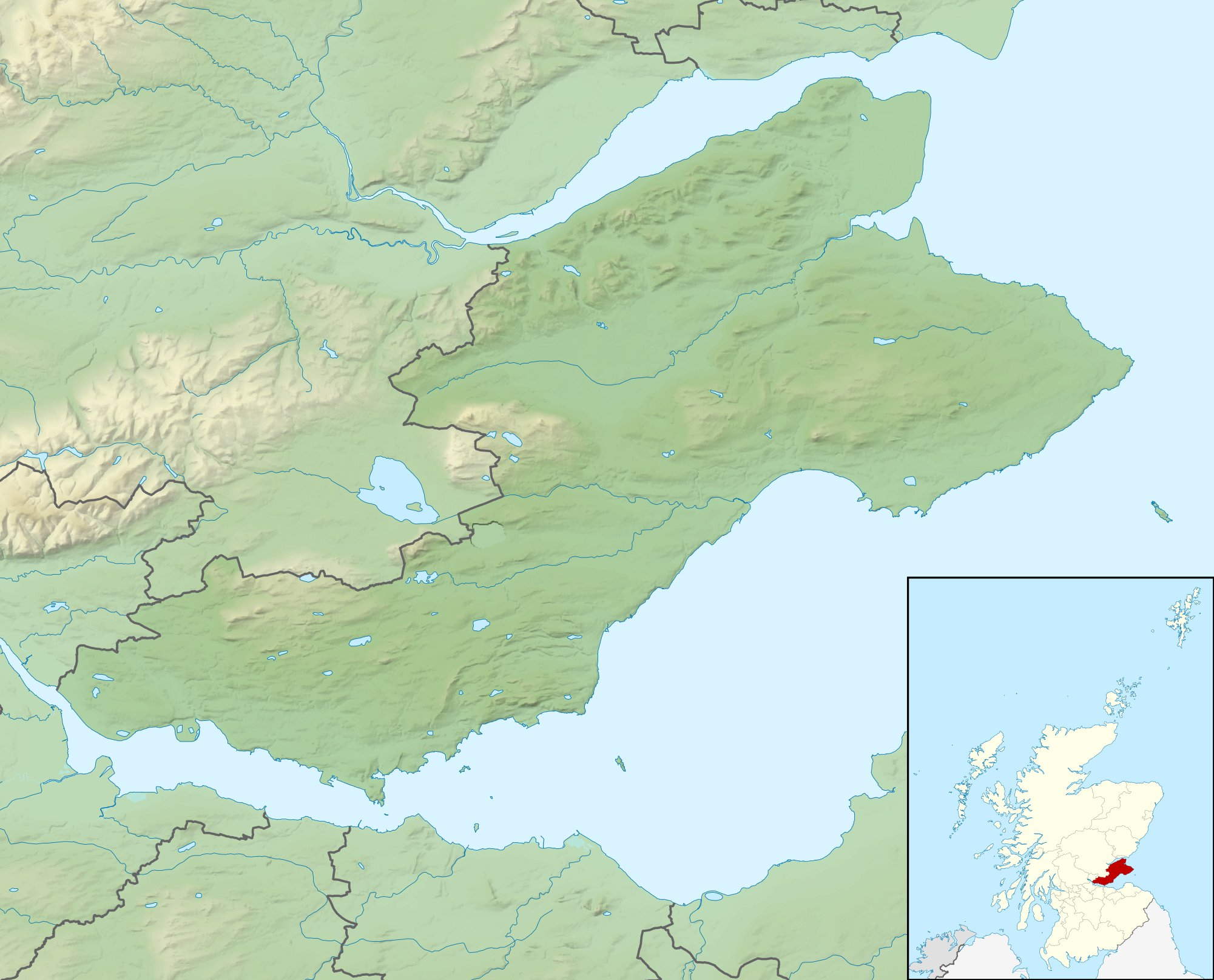
- Location within Fife
- 56.298°N 2.647°W

Club information
- Location: Fife, Scotland
- Established: 2000 (1793)
- Type: Public
- Total holes: 18
- Tournaments: Alfred Dunhill Links Championship, Ricoh Women’s British Open (2017), Jacques Léglise Trophy
- Website: https://www.kingsbarnsgolflinks.com/
- Designed by: Kyle Phillips
- Par: 72
- Length: 7,224 yards
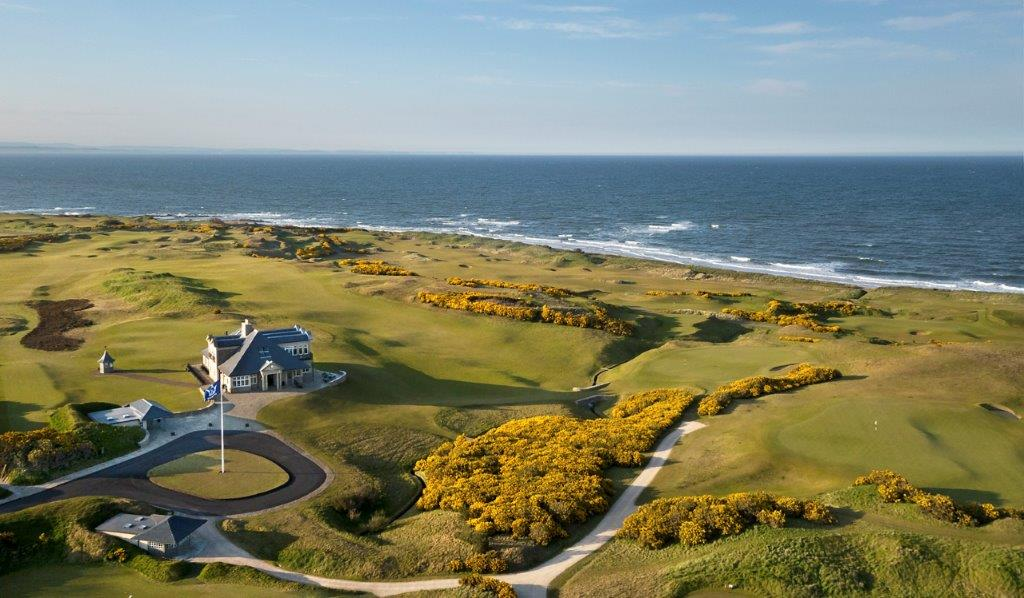
- Aerial photograph of Kingsbarns Golf Links

Kingsbarns Golf Links is a seaside Scottish links golf course along 1.8 miles of shoreline near St Andrews, Scotland. It opened in 2000 and has been rated as one of the best courses in Scotland. It has also been ranked as one of the top 100 courses in the world, and received numerous media and industry awards.

The course was designed by Kyle Phillips and the original developers were Mark Parsinen (1948-2019) and Art Dunkley. Dunkley retains ownership of the golf course following Parsinen’s departure in 2005.

Since 2001, Kingsbarns has co-hosted the Alfred Dunhill Links Championship, which is a European Tour pro-am event that is also played at The Old Course and Carnoustie Golf Links. In July 2017, Kingsbarns hosted the Ricoh Women’s British Open.

== Location ==
Kingsbarns Golf Links is located along a 1.8 mile stretch of North Sea coastline, seven miles from St Andrews, Scotland. The 220-acre site is situated within the Cambo Estate.

== History of Kingsbarns ==
Golf has been played over at least part of the current course site on and off since 1793. The Kingsbarns Golfing Society was established in 1815 and its members played on the original 9-hole Kingsbarns course until it closed in 1850.

The course was re-established in 1922 and the golfing society was reformed as Kingsbarns Golf Club which remains in existence today. Willie Auchterlonie laid out the course in 1922 which closed again at the onset of the Second World War. Land mines were installed on the course site as part of the national security defence effort and the ground reverted to rough pasture.

Construction of the current Kingsbarns Golf Links began in November 1997 under the direction of architect Kyle Phillips and the course opened in July 2000. The course has no membership and welcomes visitors.

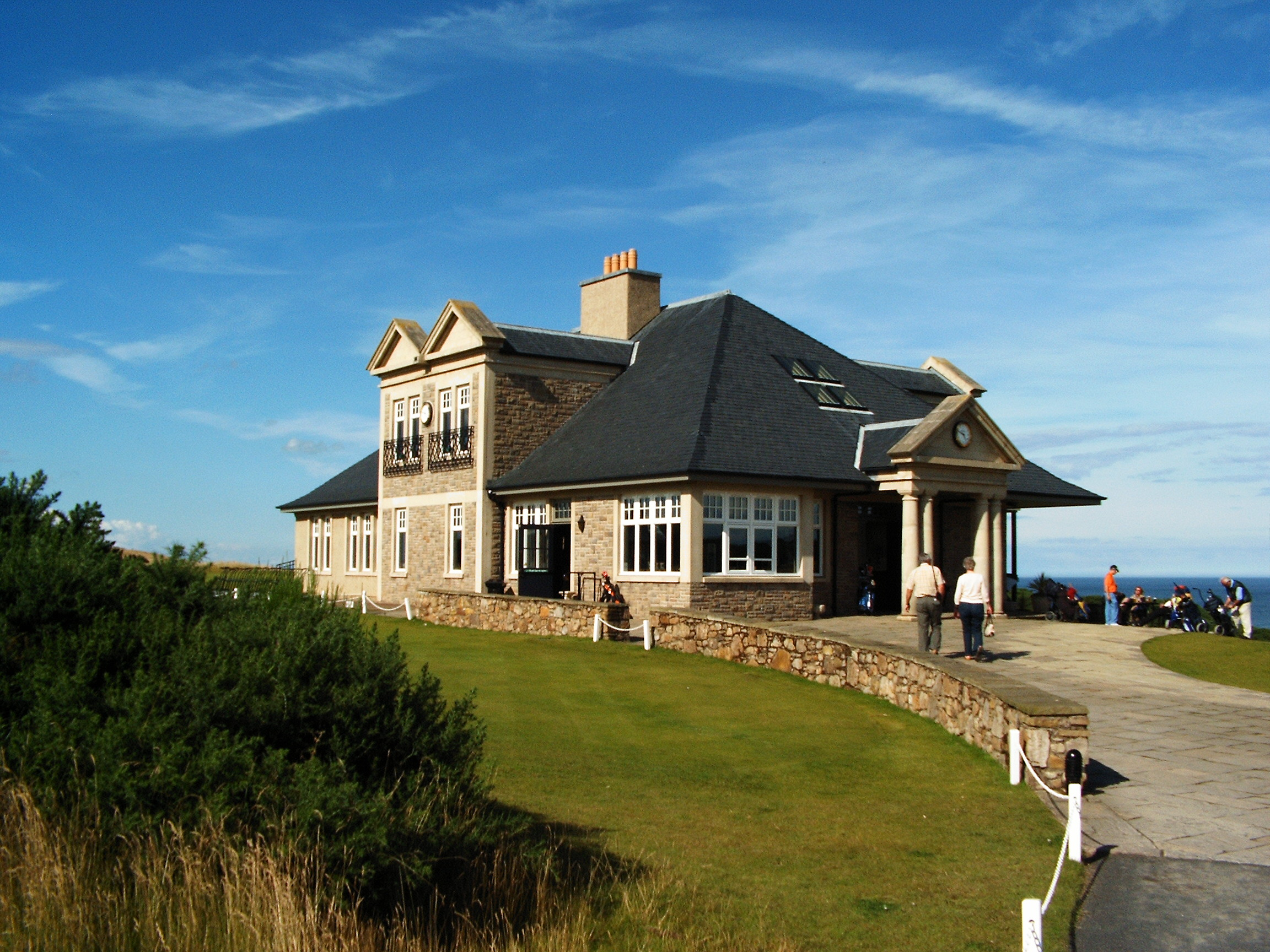
Kingsbarns Golf Links clubhouse.

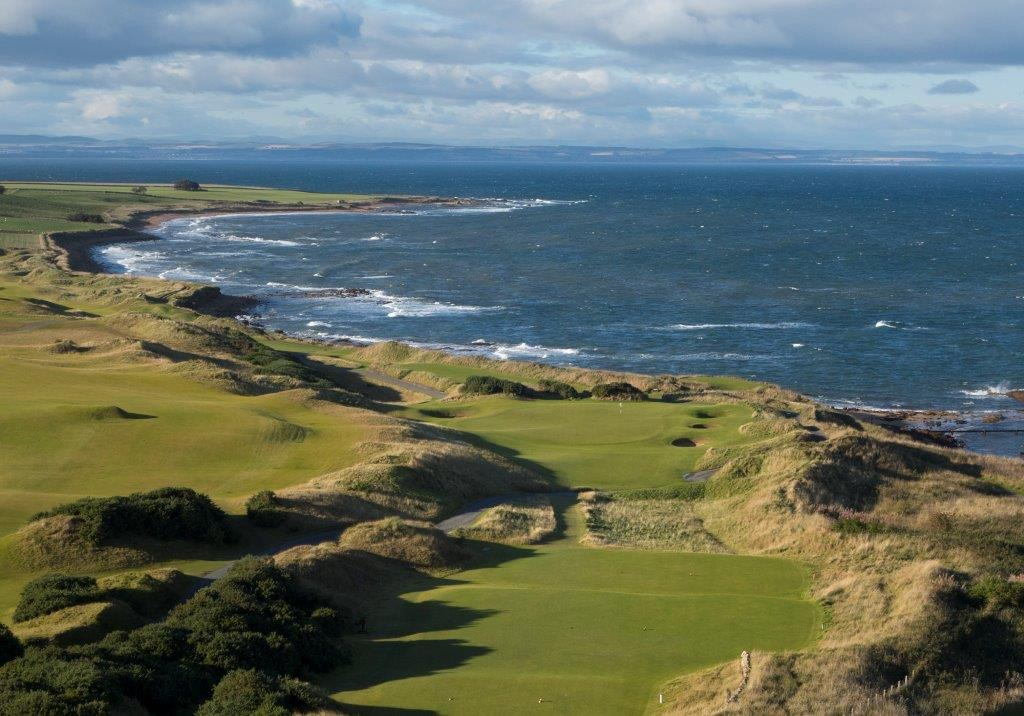
Looking down the 2nd hole at Kingsbarns Golf Links, with The North Sea to the right.

== Tournaments hosted ==
=== Ricoh Women's British Open ===
In 2017, the Ricoh Women’s British Open was held at Kingsbarns Golf Links; the winner was South Korean In-Kyung Kim.

=== Alfred Dunhill Links Championship ===
The Alfred Dunhill Links Championship is played over three courses – the Old Course at St Andrews, the Championship Course, Carnoustie Golf Links and Kingsbarns Golf Links. The tournament has a format incorporating two separate competitions – an individual professional tournament and a team competition where amateur golfers play alongside the professionals.

=== The Jacques Léglise Trophy ===
The Jacques Léglise Trophy is an under-18 tournament played annually with the venue alternating between Great Britain and Ireland and the Continent of Europe.

=== 2010 Open Championship qualifying ===
In 2010, Kingsbarns hosted The Open Championship local qualifying event when The Open itself was held at St Andrews.

== Magazine rankings ==
- 13th in "Top 100 Courses in the World" Golfscape.com 2020.
- 27th in "World's 100 Greatest Courses" – Golf Digest 2020–2021.
- 5th in "Scotland's Top 100 Golf Courses" – Golf World Top 100 2019.
- 5th in "Scotland's Top 100 Golf Courses" – National Club Golfer 2019.
- 8th in "UK and Ireland Top 100 Golf Courses" – Golf World Top 100 2019.
- 15th in "Top 100 Courses of UK and Ireland" – Golf Monthly 2019–2020.
