= John de Cambo =

Scottish knight

Sir John de Cambo (John de Cambhou) was a Scottish knight who took part in the War of Scottish Independence, as a supporter of Robert de Brus.

John was the Laird of Cambo in the East Neuk of Fife. On 16 July 1296, he renounced any alliances made with the King Philip IV of France and performed fealty to the King Edward I of England. John also performed fealty to King Edward I on 28 August 1296. He also performed fealty to King Edward I on 14 March 1304 at St Andrews. In 1305 John was in dispute over the fishing revenues from the village of Crail with Sir Henry de Beaumont, Earl of Buchan's sister Isabelle de Beaumont, the widow of John de Vesci, Baron Vesci and lost his case against her. He was with Robert the Bruce at the Battle of Methven on 19 June 1306 and was captured by English forces under Aymer de Valence, Earl of Pembroke and was executed by hanging on 4 August at Newcastle upon Tyne.
