= Francis Charteris =

Francis Charteris may refer to:

- Francis Charteris (rake) (1672–1732), famous rake, nicknamed "The Rape-Master General"
- Francis Charteris, 7th Earl of Wemyss (1723–1808), grandson who adopted his grandfather's surname on inheriting his estates
- Francis Charteris, Lord Elcho (1749–1808), British Member of Parliament for Haddington Burghs, 1780–1787
- Francis Wemyss Charteris Douglas, 8th Earl of Wemyss (1772–1853) (better known as Francis Douglas), grandson of the 7th Earl
- Francis Wemyss-Charteris, 9th Earl of Wemyss (1796–1883), son of the 8th Earl
- Francis Charteris, 10th Earl of Wemyss (1818–1914), son of the 9th Earl
- Francis David Charteris, 12th Earl of Wemyss (1912–2008) (better known as David Charteris), grandson of the 11th Earl
