= Clan Charteris =

Lowland Scottish clan

- Crest: A dexter hand holding up a dagger paleways Proper.
- Motto: This is our Charter

Profile
- Region: Scottish Lowlands

Chief
- The Right Honourable James Charteris
- Earl of Wemyss and March
- Seat: Gosford House, East Lothian
Clan branches
Charteris of Dumfries
Charteris of Kinfauns
Rival clans
Clan Kirkpatrick
Clan Douglas
Clan Ruthven

Clan Charteris is a Scottish clan of the Scottish Lowlands.

== History ==
=== Origins of the Name ===
The claimed origin of the name Charteris is that it is from the city of Chartres in France.

=== Origins of the Clan ===
William, a son of the Lord Chartres, is said to have come over with the Norman Conquest of England. William's son or grandson came to Scotland with the retinue of David I of Scotland. An early reference to the name is found in a charter of around 1174 to Kelso Abbey. In this charter the name appears written in Latin as de Carnoto.

A charter dated 1266 gives evidence of four generations of Charterises: Robert de Carnoto, a knight who is said to be the son of Thomas, who was the son of another Thomas, who was the son of Walther. In 1280 Sir Thomas de Charteris was appointed Lord Chancellor of Scotland by Alexander III of Scotland.

=== Wars of Scottish Independence ===
In 1296 Andrew de Charteris rendered homage to Edward I of England and appears on the Ragman Rolls. However, he soon took up the fight for Scottish independence. As a result, his estates were forfeited to John Balliol, who was the English-sponsored King of Scotland. Andrew's son, William Charteris, was a supporter of Robert the Bruce and was with Bruce when Comyn was killed at Dumfries in 1306. Sir Thomas Charteris was a faithful supporter of the Scottish Crown and was appointed ambassador to England. He was appointed as Lord High Chancellor of Scotland in 1342 by David II of Scotland and was killed at the Battle of Durham in 1346.

=== 16th century and clan conflicts ===
In 1526 a feud arose with the Clan Kirkpatrick (Kilpatrick). It is recorded in Pitcairn's Criminal Trials of Scotland that John Charteris of Amisfield, along with his brother and two sons, were charged with the murder of Roger Kilpatrick, son of Alexander Kilpatrick in March 1526.

In 1530 a more notable dispute took place, when Sir Robert Charteris, the eight Laird, fought a duel with Sir James Douglas of Drumlanrig, which has been described as one of the last great chivalric contests. The king himself watched the duel which was fought with such fury that Charteris's sword was broken and the king had to send his men to part the combatants.

Another branch of the clan were the Charterises of Kinfauns, who disputed the chiefship with their cousins of Dumfriesshire. The Charterises of Kinfauns are said to have received their lands as a reward for supporting Robert the Bruce against the English. However, they came into a feud with the Clan Ruthven who often disputed the authority of the Charterises. The Ruthvens held considerable sway over Perth from their Huntingtower Castle. In 1544 Patrick, Lord Ruthven was elected as Provost of Perth but at the intervention of Cardinal Beaton, Ruthven was deprived of the office and Charteris of Kinfauns was appointed instead. The city refused to acknowledge Charteris and barred the gates against him. Charteris along with Lord Gray and the Clan Leslie then attacked the town. However, they were repulsed by the Ruthvens, who were assisted by the Moncreiffs. As a result, Ruthven remained Provost of Perth until 1584, when William Ruthven, Earl of Gowrie was executed. John Charteris had been killed by the earl's heir on Edinburgh High Street in 1552.

=== 17th century and civil war ===
Sir John Charteris of Amsfield was appointed one of the Commissioners of Parliament to confirm the Treaty of Ripon in 1641. John supported the National Covenant but did not rise against the king. As a result, he was imprisoned in Edinburgh in 1643 but was released in March 1645. He afterwards joined the forces of James Graham, 1st Marquis of Montrose and was with the royal forces when they were surprised at the Battle of Philiphaugh in September 1645. John's brother, Captain Alexander Charteris was one of Montrose's staff and was with him on his ill-fated campaign in Caithness in 1650. Alexander Charteris was captured with Montrose and was executed by the Maiden in Edinburgh on 21 June 1650. The family estates then passed through an heiress to Thomas Hogg, who later assumed the name of Charteris.

=== 18th and 19th centuries ===
Colonel Francis Charteris who was the male representative of the family, bought lands near Haddington, which he renamed Amsfield to recall his ancestor's family seat in Nithsdale. He left an only daughter, Janet, who married the Earl of Wemyss. Their second son was Francis Wemyss who later assumed the name Charteris. The Charteris estates near Haddington have since been sold, although Gosford House is still the seat of the Earl of Wemyss and March, chief of the name and arms of Charteris.

== Chief ==
Since 2008, the family's chief has been The Right Honourable James Donald Charteris, Earl of Wemyss and March, Viscount of Peebles, Lord Wemyss of Elcho, Lord Elcho and Methil, Lord Douglas of Neidpath, Lyne and Munard.

== See also ==
- Scottish clan
- Earl of Wemyss
