= Richard Charteris =

Scottish cricketer and British Army officer

Personal information
- Full name: Richard Charteris
- Born: 25 July 1822; Aberlady, East Lothian, Scotland
- Died: 16 March 1874 (aged 51); Westminster, London, England
- Batting: Unknown
- Relatives: Hugo Charteris (nephew)

Domestic team information
- Years: Team
- 1847: Marylebone Cricket Club

Career statistics
Competition	First-class
Matches	1
Runs scored	0
Batting average	0.00
100s/50s	–/–
Top score	0*
Catches/stumpings	1/–
- Source: Cricinfo, 16 September 2021

The Hon. Richard Charteris DL (25 July 1822 – 16 March 1874) was a Scottish first-class cricketer and British Army officer.

== Life ==
The son of Francis Wemyss-Charteris, 9th Earl of Wemyss, he was born in July 1822 at Aberlady, East Lothian. He entered into the British Army when he purchased the rank of first lieutenant in the Rifle Brigade in October 1842, before purchasing the rank of captain in May 1847. In the summer of 1847, he played a single first-class cricket match for the Marylebone Cricket Club (MCC) against Cambridge University at Lord's. Batting twice in the match, he batted at number eleven and ended the MCC first innings of 84 all out unbeaten without scoring. In their second innings he was dismissed without scoring by William Hammersley.

In the winter of 1847, he was made a lieutenant and captain. By 1854 he had transferred to the Royal Scots Fusiliers, gaining promotion without purchase to captain and lieutenant colonel. He retired from active service in November 1862, before coming out of retirement in June 1864, joining the Grenadier Guards. In May of the same year he was appointed a deputy lieutenant of County Tipperary in Ireland. He had served for many years as the aide de camp to the Duke of Cambridge.

== Death and legacy ==
Charteris died at his Grosvenor Square dwelling on the evening of 16 March 1874, having been suffering from an incurable disease. His nephew Hugo Charteris also played first-class cricket.
