= Hugo Charteris (cricketer) =

English cricketer (1884–1916)

Hugo Charteris (28 December 1884 – 23 April 1916) was an English cricketer.

== Early life and education ==
He was born in Salisbury on 28 December 1884, the eldest son of Hugo Charteris, Lord Elcho (later the 11th Earl of Wemyss) and Mary Wyndham, and was baptised in February 1885 at St James's, Piccadilly.

He was educated at Eton, and subsequently went up to Trinity College, Cambridge, in 1903.

He married Lady Violet Catherine Manners, the daughter of Henry John Brinsley Manners, 8th Duke of Rutland and Marion Margaret Violet Lindsay, on 1 February 1911. They had two children; David Charteris, 12th Earl of Wemyss, born in 1912, and Martin Charteris, who became Private Secretary to Queen Elizabeth, born in 1913.

Between the death of his grandfather, the 10th Earl of Wemyss in 1914 and his own death in 1916 he was styled as Lord Elcho, the courtesy title afforded to the heir apparent to the earldom of Wemyss.

== Cricket ==
He made a single first-class appearance for Gloucestershire during the 1910 season, against Surrey at the Oval. A right-handed batsman, he scored a single run in the only innings in which he batted. Charteris' brother-in-law, Archer Windsor-Clive, and uncle Richard Charteris also both played first-class cricket.

== First World War ==
He was commissioned as lieutenant in the Gloucestershire Yeomanry (Royal Gloucestershire Hussars) in July 1912. During the First World War he was killed in action on 23 April 1916, while serving with his regiment at the Battle of Katia; he has no known grave, but is commemorated on the Jerusalem Memorial. His brother, Yvo Alan Charteris was also killed during the war, during an assault on the Hohenzollern Redoubt while serving with the Grenadier Guards.
