= James Charteris, 13th Earl of Wemyss =

British peer and landowner

The Right Honourable The Earl of Wemyss DL
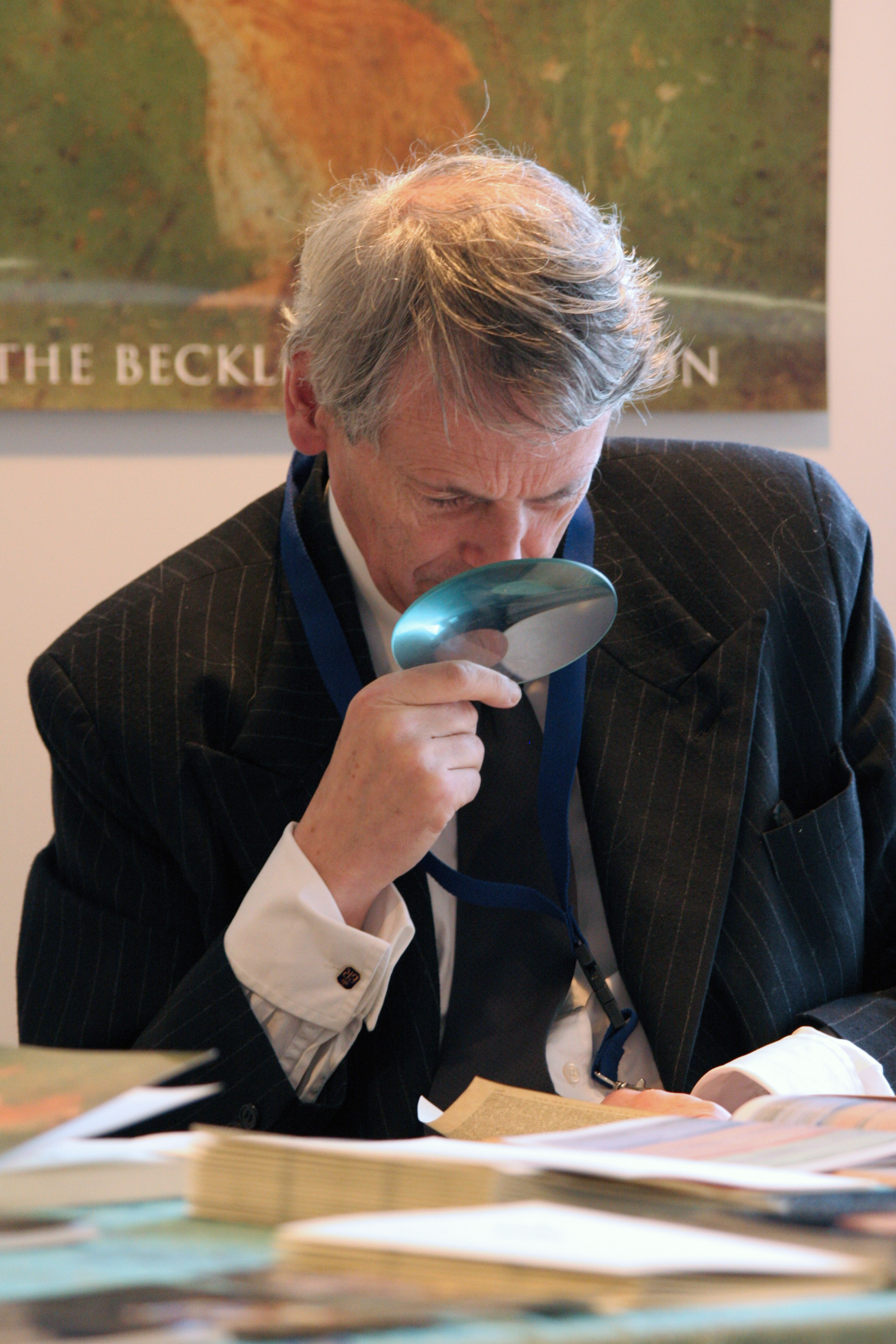
- Pictured at the 2008 World Psychedelic Forum in Basel, Switzerland
- Born: James Donald Charteris; 22 June 1948 (age 78)
- Other name: Jamie Neidpath
- Education: Eton College; Oxford University (BA, 1969; MA, 1974); St Antony's College, Oxford (DPhil, 1975); Royal Agricultural College (1978)
- Spouses: Catherine Guinness (m. 1983; div. 1988) Amanda Feilding (m. 1995; died 2025)
- Children: 2, including Lady Mary Charteris
- Parent(s): David Charteris, 12th Earl of Wemyss; Mavis Murray

Lord Wemyss' coat of arms Quarterly: 1st & 4th argent, a fess azure within a double tressure flory-counterflory gules (Charteris); 2nd & 3rd, Or, a lion rampant gules armed and langued azure (Wemyss)

James Donald Charteris, 13th Earl of Wemyss and 9th Earl of March, DL (/ˈtʃɑːrtərɪs/; born 22 June 1948), also known as Jamie Neidpath, is a British peer and landowner.

== Biography ==
=== Early life ===
Wemyss is the second son of Francis David Charteris, 12th Earl of Wemyss, and his first wife, Mavis Murray. He was educated at Eton College. While a teenager he was Page of Honour to the Queen Mother. He went to Oxford (BA 1969, MA 1974), obtaining a DPhil from St Antony's College in 1975. He obtained a diploma from the Royal Agricultural College in 1978. He is known to have undergone an operation of trepanation in 1996 in Cairo, drilling holes in the head, a practice undergone apparently to relieve depression and stimulate creativity. He said, "It seemed to be very beneficial."

=== Career ===
He runs Alro Group, a real estate fund management group.

He became heir apparent to the Earldoms of Wemyss and March on the death of his elder brother, Iain David Charteris, Lord Elcho, in 1954. He was subsequently known as Lord Neidpath, as opposed to the usual courtesy title of Lord Elcho. He was appointed a Deputy Lieutenant of Gloucestershire in 2005.

He donated £58,000 between 2001 and 2015 to the political party UKIP as Lord James D Neidpath or Lord James Charteris, with no further donations registered to those names or Wemyss as of 2023.

=== Personal life ===
He married Catherine Guinness (born 1952), daughter of Jonathan Guinness, 3rd Baron Moyne (and granddaughter of Diana Mitford and Bryan Guinness), in July 1983. They have a son, Francis Richard (Dick) Charteris, Lord Elcho (b. 1984), who is the heir to the earldoms, and a daughter, Lady Mary Olivia Charteris, a model and singer. James and Catherine were divorced in 1988, and she married Robert Hesketh in 1990.

He later married Amanda Feilding in January 1995. In 1996 she founded The Foundation to Further Consciousness, renamed the Beckley Foundation in 1998, a non-profit organisation which carries out psychedelic research, and continued as its director until her death in May 2025. They lived at Stanway House in Gloucestershire and at Gosford House in East Lothian.

His uncle Martin Charteris, Baron Charteris of Amisfield was Private Secretary to Queen Elizabeth II.

Peerage of Scotland
Preceded by David Charteris	Earl of Wemyss; 2008–present	Incumbent; Heir: Richard Charteris, Lord Elcho
Preceded by David Charteris	Earl of March; 2008–present	Incumbent; Heir: Richard Charteris, Lord Elcho
Peerage of the United Kingdom
Preceded by David Charteris	Baron Wemyss; 2008–present	Incumbent; Heir: Richard Charteris, Lord Elcho
