= David Charteris, 12th Earl of Wemyss =

Scottish peer

The Right Honourable The Earl of Wemyss and March KT DL

Lord Clerk Register
- In office 28 July 1974 – 27 April 2007
- Monarch: Elizabeth II
- Preceded by: The 8th Duke of Buccleuch
- Succeeded by: Lord Mackay

Member of the House of Lords Lord Temporal
- In office 12 July 1937 – 11 November 1999; Hereditary Peerage

Personal details
- Born: Francis David Charteris; 19 January 1912 Stanway, England
- Died: 12 December 2008 (aged 96) Edinburgh, Scotland
- Parents: Capt. Hugo Charteris, Lord Elcho (father); Lady Violet Manners (mother)
- Education: Eton College
- Alma mater: Balliol College, Oxford

Military service
- Allegiance: United Kingdom
- Branch/service: British Army
- Years of service: 1932–1944
- Rank: Major
- Unit: Lovat Scouts, Royal Pioneer Corps
- Battles/wars: World War II

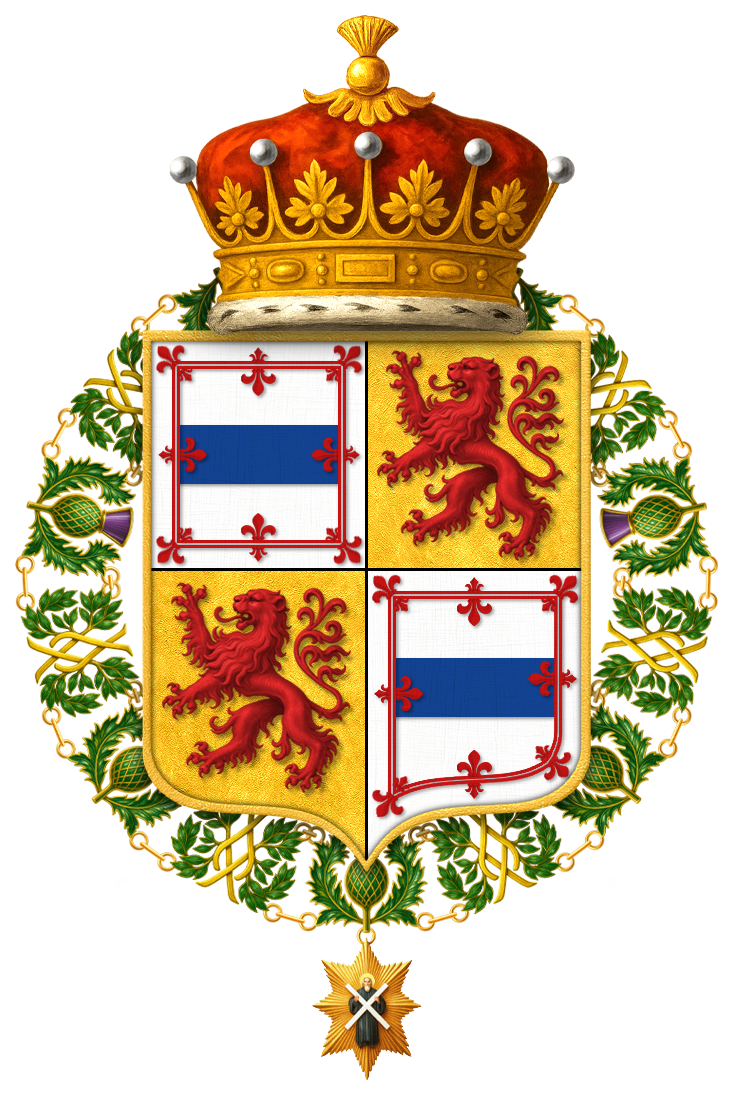
Shield of Arms of Francis David Charteris, 12th Earl of Wemyss and 8th Earl of March, KT, DL

Francis David Charteris, 12th Earl of Wemyss and 8th Earl of March KT DL (19 January 1912 – 12 December 2008), styled Lord Elcho from 1916 to 1937, was a Scottish peer, landowner and conservationist. From 1946 to 1991, he served as chairman and then president of the National Trust for Scotland.

== Early life and education ==
He was born in Belgravia in London, the eldest son of Lady Violet Manners, daughter of the 8th Duke of Rutland, and Capt. Hugo Francis Charteris, Lord Elcho, who was killed in action in 1916 in Egypt while serving in the First World War. He was educated at Eton College and at Balliol College, Oxford (BA 1933), and also studied agriculture at both Oxford and Cambridge as a postgraduate student. At age 25, he succeeded his grandfather in the family titles in 1937.

== Career ==
Wemyss was commissioned into the Lovat Scouts (Territorial Army) as a 2nd Lieutenant in 1932. He was promoted to Lieutenant in 1935 and transferred to the TA Reserve of Officers in 1937, and served as a Colonial Administrator in Basutoland from 1937 until 1944. During the Second World War, he did not rejoin the Lovat Scouts but instead served as a major with Basuto troops in the African Auxiliary Pioneer Corps from 1941 to 1944 in North Africa, on account of his fluency in Sotho.

He was Deputy Lieutenant from 1959 to 1967 and Lord Lieutenant of East Lothian from 1967 until 1987, and a Justice of the Peace since 1957. He was appointed as Lord High Commissioner to the General Assembly of the Church of Scotland in 1959, 1960 and 1977. He held the honorary appointment of Lord Clerk Register from 1974 until 2007.

He was a Lieutenant in the Royal Company of Archers. He was Chairman of the Council of the National Trust for Scotland 1947 to 1967, President from 1967 to 1991, and had been President Emeritus since 1991. He was Chairman of the Royal Commission on the Ancient and Historical Monuments of Scotland from 1949 to 1984, President of the Royal Scottish Geographical Society from 1958 to 1962, and President of the National Bible Society of Scotland from 1960 to 1983. He was formerly a director of Standard Life and of Scottish Television.

== Personal life ==
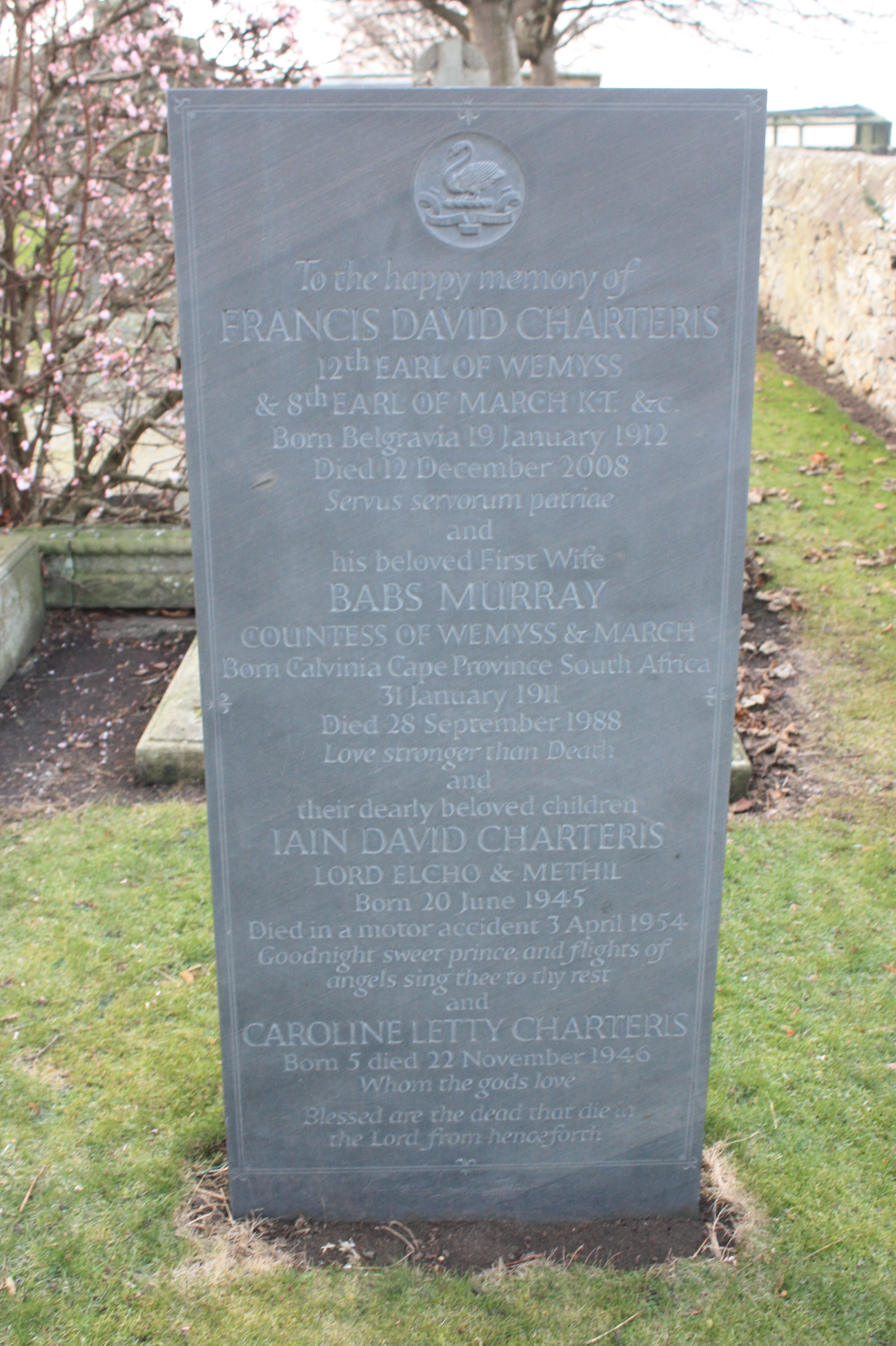
The grave of Lord Wemyss, Aberlady Churchyard

He married, first, in 1940, Mavis Lynette Gordon Murray (d. 1988), daughter of Edwin Edward Murray, of Hermanus, Cape Province, South Africa. They had two daughters and two sons. The elder son, Iain David Charteris, Lord Elcho & Methil, was born on 20 June 1945 and died in a motor accident on 3 April 1954. Their younger daughter Caroline Letty Charteris was born on 5 November 1946 and died on 22 November 1946. Lord Wemyss married, secondly, in 1995, Shelagh Kathleen Kennedy, née Thrift.

He lived in Gosford House, Longniddry, East Lothian. He died on 12 December 2008 at the Royal Victoria Hospital, Edinburgh, aged 96. He is buried in the family enclosure on the north side of Aberlady Churchyard. Lady Wemyss died in 2019.

His younger brother, Martin Charteris, Baron Charteris of Amisfield, was Private Secretary to Queen Elizabeth II.

His younger son, James Donald Charteris, Lord Neidpath (b. 22 June 1948), succeeded his father.

== Honours ==
Wemyss was made a Knight of the Thistle in 1966. He held an honorary LLD from the University of St Andrews awarded in 1953, and an honorary DUniv from the University of Edinburgh awarded in 1983.

Political offices
Preceded by The Duke of Buccleuch	Lord Clerk Register; 1974–2007	Succeeded by The Lord Mackay of Clashfern
Honorary titles
Preceded by The Marquess of Tweeddale	Lord Lieutenant of East Lothian; 1967–1987	Succeeded by Sir Hew Hamilton-Dalrymple
Peerage of Scotland
Preceded by Hugo Charteris	Earl of Wemyss; 1937–2008	Succeeded by James Charteris
Preceded by Hugo Charteris	Earl of March; 1937–2008	Succeeded by James Charteris
Peerage of the United Kingdom
Preceded by Hugo Charteris	Baron Wemyss; 1937–2008; Member of the House of Lords (1937–1999)	Succeeded by James Charteris
