= Stanway House =

Grade I listed historic house museum in the United Kingdom

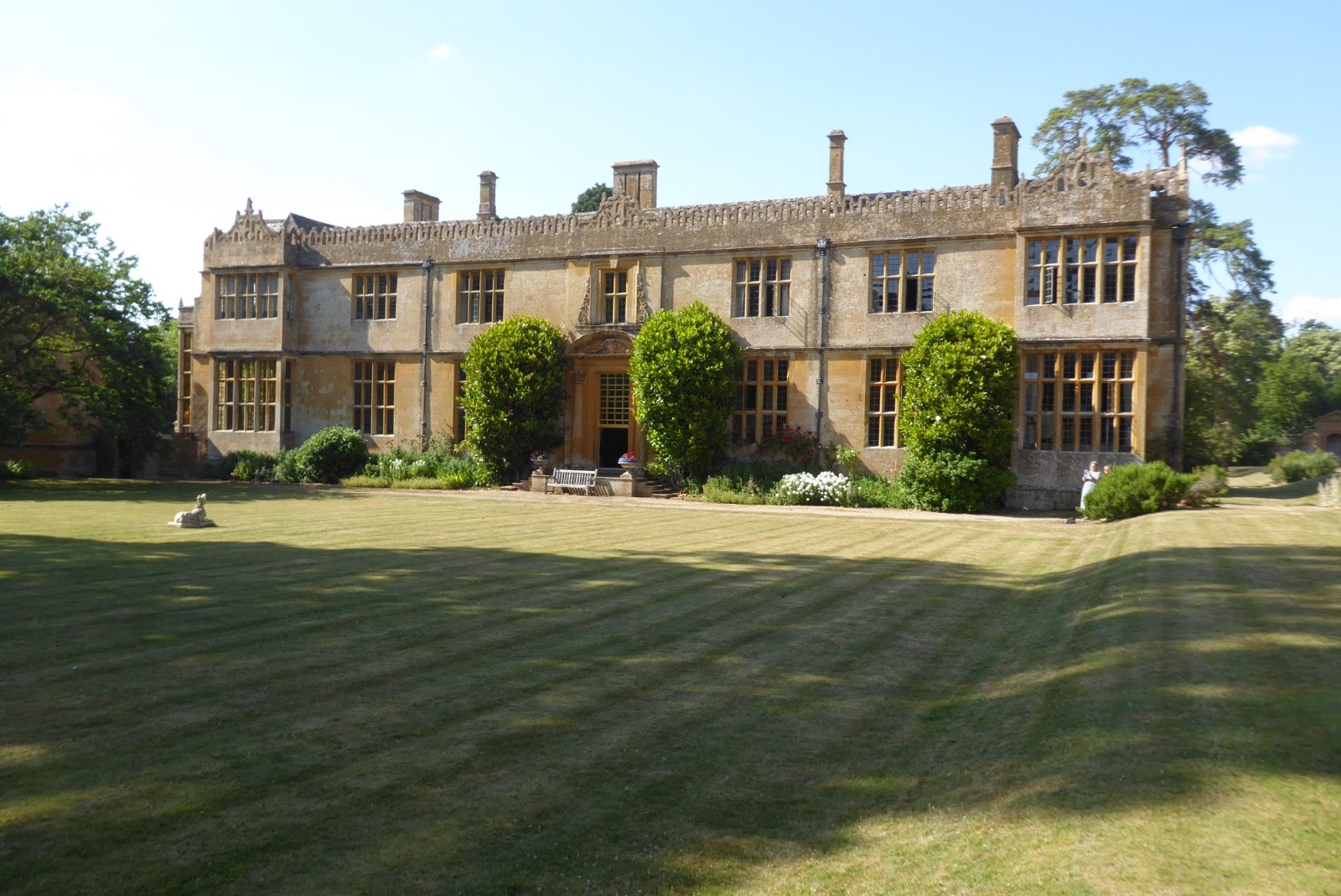
- Stanway House south front
- Interactive map of the Stanway House area

General information
- Location: Stanway, Gloucestershire, England
- Coordinates: 51.98981°N 1.91237°W
- Opened: late 16th and early 17th century
- Owner: James Charteris, 13th Earl of Wemyss

Listed Building – Grade I
- Official name: Stanway House
- Designated: 4 July 1960
- Reference no.: 1154381

National Register of Historic Parks and Gardens
- Official name: Stanway House
- Designated: 28 February 1986
- Reference no.: 1000480

Website
- www.stanwayfountain.co.uk

Stanway House is a Jacobean manor house near the village of Stanway in Gloucestershire, England. The manor of Stanway was owned by Tewkesbury Abbey for 800 years, then for 500 years by the Tracy family and their descendants, the Earls of Wemyss and March.

Stanway House, originally constructed in the late 16th and early 17th century for the Tracy family, is a Grade I listed building. The principal rooms are in a long south-facing range forming an L-shape with the hall, unlike the usual Tudor house plan of a central hall. The north-east wing, remodelled in 1913 by Detmar Blow, was demolished in 1948. The kitchen court was designed by William Burn in 1859. The gatehouse was built in about 1630. The construction includes Guiting yellow stone and some Jacobean mullions and gables.

The current owner James Charteris, 13th Earl of Wemyss and March, has pursued a programme of restoration for a number of years. The house and grounds are open to the public on a limited basis each summer.

== History ==
The current earl recounted his understanding of the history of the property during a 2016 interview with the publication Cotswold Homes, as follows:

The estate goes back to 715, we think. It was given to Tewkesbury Abbey by Odo and Dodo, two Saxons who lived in the Winchcombe area. Then in 1533 it was leased to Richard Tracy. Richard had a bee in his bonnet about the fact his father was declared to be a heretic after he was already dead, his body being dug up and burnt. So he became friendly with Thomas Cromwell, who was leading an anti-monastic campaign at the time. Cromwell – who was so powerful at that point - suggested the abbey lease the land to Richard and it was done within four days of Cromwell writing the letter.

Records from 1291 indicate that the estate had three corn mills and a fulling mill used for processing wool from the many sheep owned by the abbey. The latter was converted in the late 17th century to grind corn and is now the Stanway Watermill. Another source states that the work on the house began around 1580 on the ruins of an earlier Tudor house, with construction commissioned by Paul Tracy, Richard Tracy's son. The triple-gabled Jacobean gateway was created by Paul's son, Sir Richard Tracy, in 1630. The water features were probably added by John Tracy who was the lord during 1724–35.

J. M. Barrie, creator of Peter Pan, was a frequent visitor during summers in the 1920s, until 1932. The house is the home of James Charteris, 13th Earl of Wemyss and his late wife, drug policy reformer Amanda Feilding. It is also the family home of Fielding's son, Kensington and Chelsea London Borough Council’s deputy leader Rock Feilding-Mellen, who was involved in the Grenfell Tower fire disaster. During some summer months, the property is open to the public.

== Estate ==
=== Gardens ===
The gardens are Grade I listed on the Register of Historic Parks and Gardens. The estate brewery, an original Elizabethan feature, has been re-established.

=== Wider estate ===
Cutsdean Quarry, which is a nature reserve and designated a Key Wildlife Site (KWS) in the Cotswolds, is part of the Stanway Estate. The estate watermill, just outside the grounds, has been restored to full working condition and produces wholemeal and sifted flour.

=== Grade I listed buildings ===
In addition to the house, the gatehouse, the entrance courtyard gates, and the tithe barn all have Grade I listings. The ancient tithe barn was built in about 1370 for Tewkesbury Abbey and restored in 1927.

=== Stanway fountain ===
The Long Canal was filled in around 1850 but was restored in the early 2000s, a necessary step to creating the current fountain, which was not an original feature of the estate. The mill pond was dredged and the eight ponds and the cascade were restored at about the same time.

The Stanway Fountain was opened on 5 June 2004 in the grounds of Stanway House. The single-jet fountain, which rises to over 300 feet (91 m), is the tallest fountain in Britain (followed by Witley Court at 121 feet (37 m)), the tallest gravity-fed fountain in the world (followed by the Fountain of Fame at La Granja de San Ildefonso, Segovia, Spain at 153 feet (47 m)), and the second-tallest fountain in Europe, after the Jet d'Eau, a 400 feet (120 m) high turbine-driven fountain in Geneva, Switzerland. The fountain has a 2 inches (5.1 cm) bronze nozzle and is driven from a 100,000-imperial-gallon (450,000 L; 120,000 US gal) reservoir, above the canal in which it is situated. The reservoir is 530 feet (160 m) above the canal. The 12 inches (30 cm) diameter pipe which feeds the fountain is 2 kilometres (1.2 mi) long.

== Media appearances ==
The house has featured as a filming set for TV and movies including: Jeeves and Wooster; Vanity Fair; The Christmas Candle; Father Brown; Emma and The Libertine; and Wolf Hall;;The Good Soldier (1981), and 'The Clandestine Marriage'.

== Gallery ==
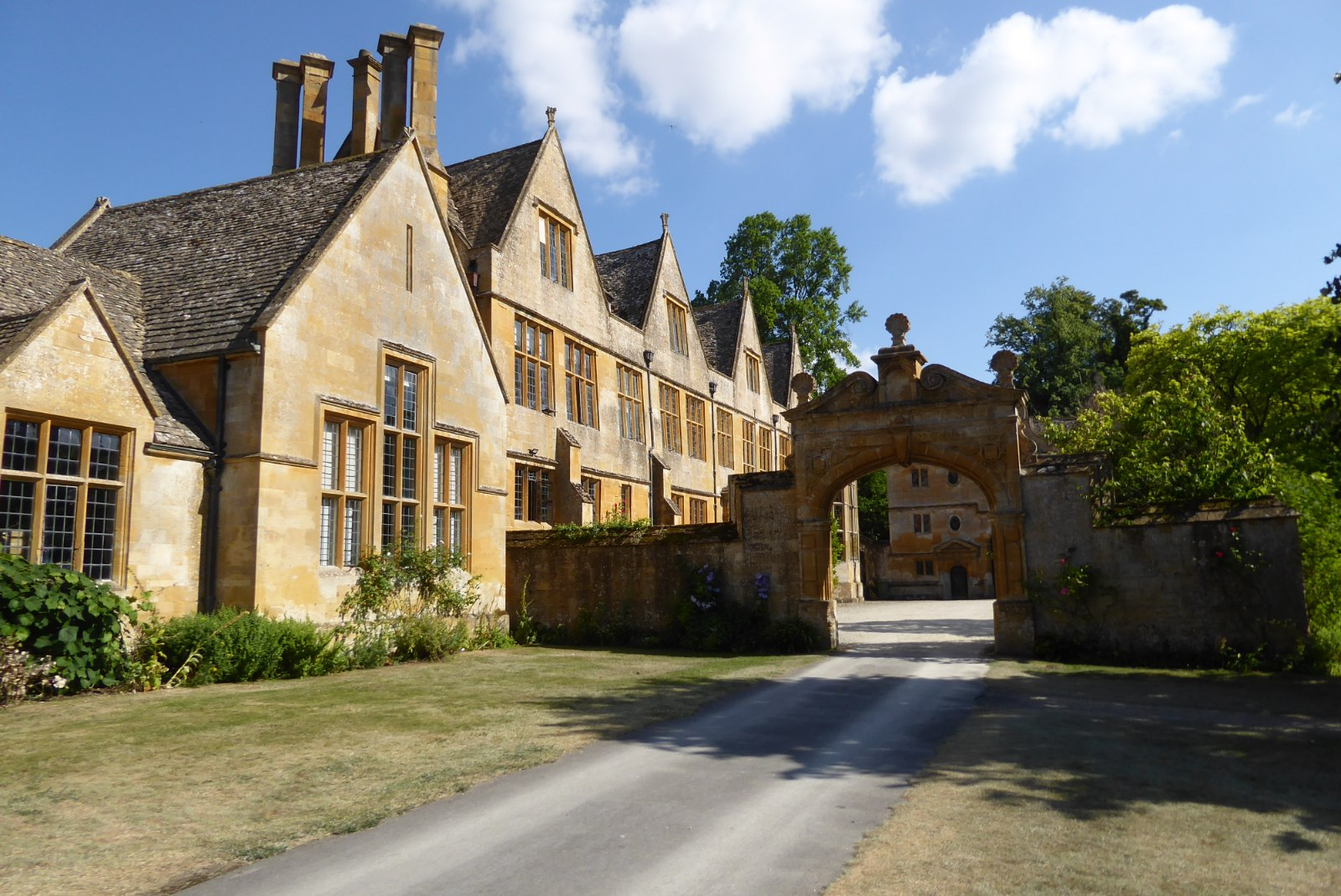
West front

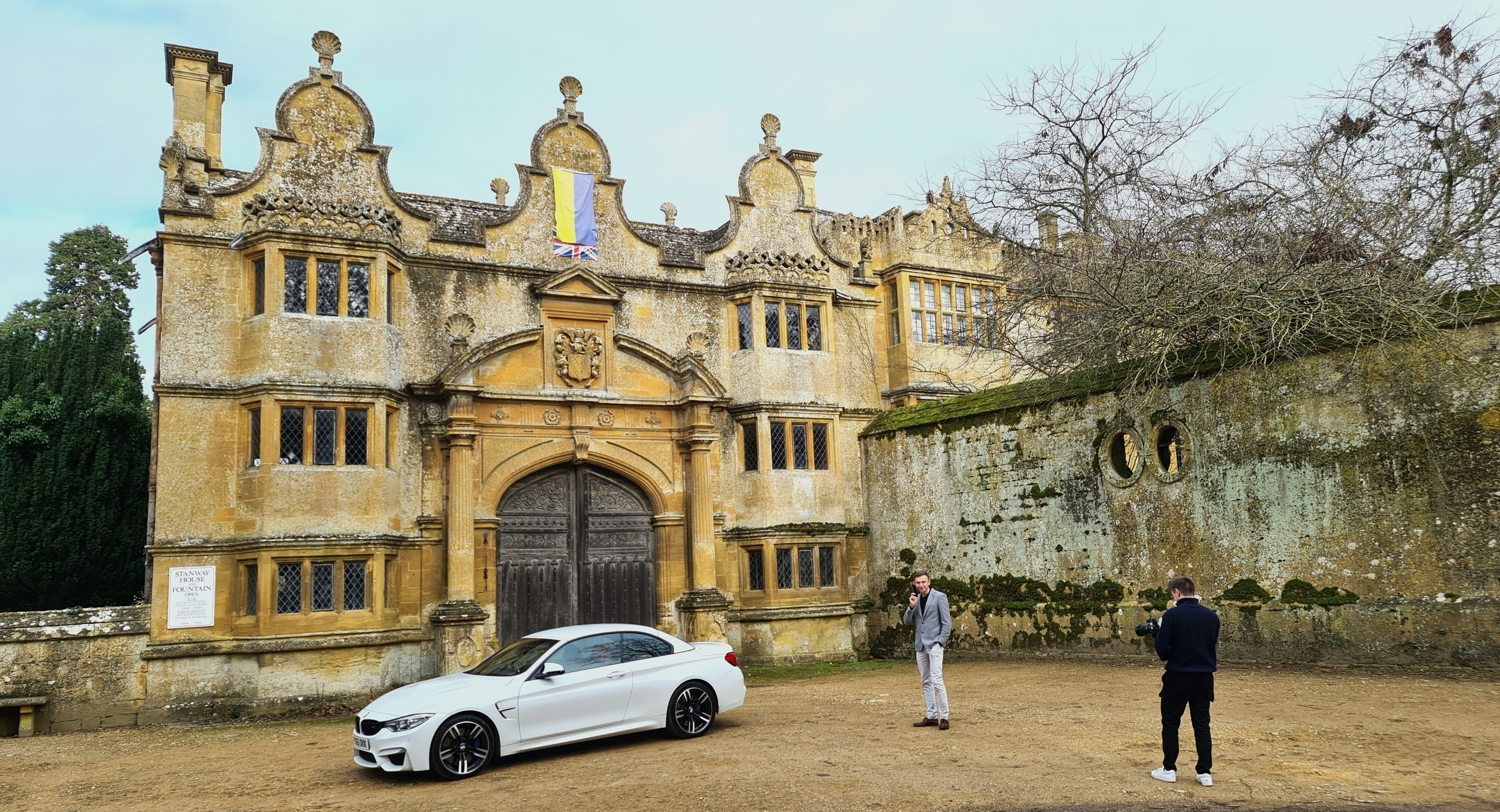
Gatehouse

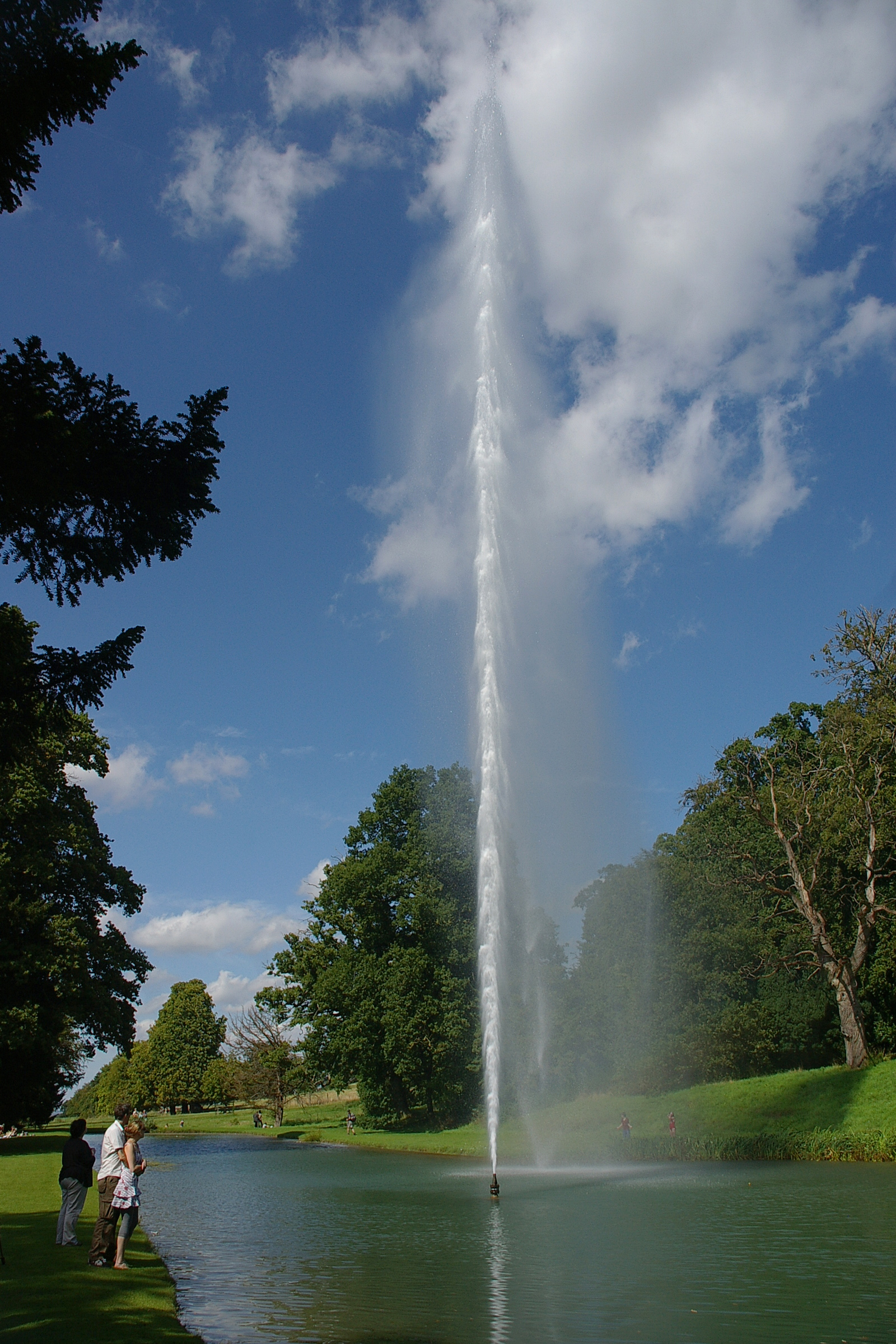
Stanway fountain

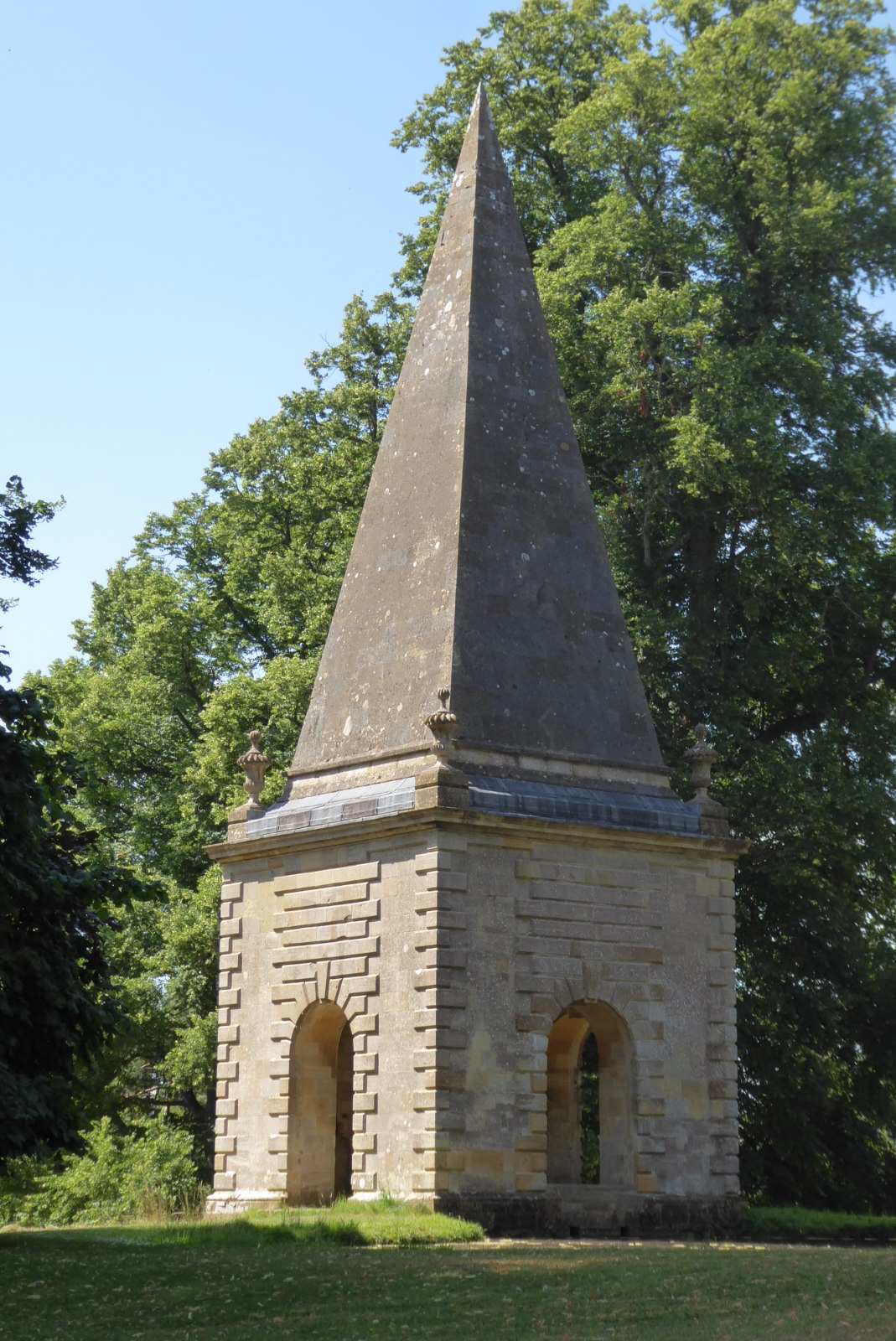
The Pyramid, Stanway House
