= 1917 Birthday Honours =

National awards given by King George V

The 1917 Birthday Honours were appointments by King George V to various orders and honours to reward and highlight good works by citizens of the British Empire. The appointments were made to celebrate the official birthday of The King, and were published on 4 June and 19 June.

The recipients of honours are displayed here as they were styled before their new honour, and arranged by honour, with classes (Knight, Knight Grand Cross, etc.) and then divisions (Military, Civil, etc.) as appropriate.

== United Kingdom and British Empire ==
=== Viscount ===
- The Rt. Hon. Hudson Ewbanke Kearley, Baron Devonport, DL, the first British Food Controller, previously chairman of the Port of London Authority. Member of Parliament for Devonport from 1892 to 1910.
- The Rt. Hon. Horace Brand Farquhar, Baron Farquhar, GCVO, Lord Steward since 1915, Master of the Household of King Edward, 1901–1907; Member of Parliament for West Marylebone from 1895 to 1898.
- William Waldorf Astor, Baron Astor. Philanthropist and United States Minister to Italy.

=== Baron ===
- Lieutenant-Colonel The Rt. Hon. Amelius Richard Mark Lockwood, CVO, MP, by the name, style and title of Baron Lambourne, of Lambourne, in the county of Essex..
- Colonel Richard Godolphin Walmesley Chaloner, MP, by the name, style and title of Baron Gisborough, of Cleveland, in the County of York.
- Sir Frederick Henry Smith, Bt, DL, by the name, style and title of Baron Colwyn, of Colwyn Bay in the County of Denbigh.
- Major-General Sir Ivor John Caradoc Herbert, Bt, MP, by the name, style and title of Baron Treowen, of Treowen and Llanarth, in the county of Monmouth.
- Sir William Hesketh Lever, Bt, by the name, style and title of Baron Leverhulme, of Bolton-le-Moors, in the County Palatine of Lancaster.

=== Privy Councillor ===
The King appointed the following to His Majesty's Most Honourable Privy Council:.

- Henry William Forster, MP.
- Captain Ernest George Pretyman, MP.
- Lord Claud Hamilton, MP.
- Evelyn Cecil, MP.
- James Henry Thomas, MP.
- The Hon. Neil Primrose, MP.
- Thomas Ashton, DL.
- Major Arthur Gore, Earl of Arran, KP.
- Sir William Goulding, Bt.

=== Aide-de-camp (ADC) ===
- Colonel (temporary Major-General) Henry Edward Burstall, CB, CMG, Canadian Forces.
- Colonel (temporary Brigadier-General) Edward Walter Clervaux Chaytor, CB, CMG, New Zealand Staff Corps.
- Lieutenant-Colonel (temporary Brigadier-General) Frederick Stewart Dawson, CMG, South African Forces.
- Colonel (temporary Major-General) Cyril Brudenell Bingham White, CB, DSO, Australian Forces.

=== Baronetcies ===
- Arthur Herbert Drummond Ramsay Steel-Maitland, MP.
- Colonel Herbert Merton Jessel, MP.
- Henry Machu Imbert-Terry.
- Arthur Charles Churchman
- Sir Edward Hildred Carlile, MP.
- James Knott.
- William Norton Hicking.
- George Smith Clark.
- James Farquharson Remnant, DL.
- Beville Stanier, MP.
- William Cresswell Gray, DL.
- Thomas Dewar, DL.
- The Right Hon. Thomas Wallace Russell, MP.
- Sir Thomas Henry Elliott, KCB.
- Colonel Alan Sykes, MP.
- Sir Philip Magnus, MP.
- Sir Robert Abbott Hadfield, FRS.
- Sir Richard Mathias.
- Evan Davies Jones.
- The Rt. Hon. Sir William Henry Dunn.
- Sir John Gordon Nairne.
- Richard Vassar Vassar-Smith, DL.
- Joseph Wesley Flavelle.
- Dr. Frederick Taylor.
- Heath Harrison.

=== Knight Bachelor ===
- William J . Ashley, Dean of the Faculty of Commerce at Birmingham.
- John Audley Frederick Aspinall, General Manager of the Lancashire and Yorkshire Railway.
- Graham Balfour, Secretary to the Staffordshire Education Committee.
- Francis H. Barker.
- Rowland Barran, MP.
- William Barton, MP.
- William Cain.
- Frederick W. A. Clarke, Accountant and Comptroller-General of the Customs and Excise.
- Arthur Stockdale Cope, RA.
- William Henry Cowan, MP.
- Colonel Thomas Kennedy Dalziel, RAMC.
- Henry Davies, CB. Controller of the Post Office Savings Bank.
- George Samuel Elliott, DL.
- Thomas Gregory Foster, Provost of University College, London.
- John Foster Fraser, FRGS, FZS.
- Richard Tetley Glazebrook, CB, FRS. Director of the National Physical Laboratory.
- Robert Graham, DL, JP.
- Henry Herbert Hambling.
- George Haysom, Sheriff of the City of London.
- Thomas Erskine Holland, KC, DCL, LLD.
- Lieutenant-Colonel William Henry Houghton-Gastrell, MP.
- Robert Murray Hyslop.
- Robert Jones, CB, FRCS, Lecturer on Orthopaedic Surgery at Liverpool University.
- John Lorne McLeod, Lord Provost of Edinburgh.
- Alex. Herbert Maguire.
- Charles Edward Mallet.
- Edward Marshall-Hall, Esq., KC, MP. Recorder of Guildford.
- Ernest Martin.
- Grimwood Mears.
- Major Lewis Arthur Newton. Sheriff of the City of London.
- Henry George Norris, Mayor of Fulham.
- Ebenezer Parkes, MP.
- William Peck, FRSE, FRAS. Director of the City Observatory, Calton Hill, Edinburgh.
- Robert Leonard Powell
- W. Beddoe Rees.
- Alfred Farthing Robbins.
- Samuel Roberts, MP.
- Charles Walter Starmer, JP.
- Dudley Stewart-Smith, KC, Vice-Chancellor of the County Palatine of Lancaster
- William Hamo Thornycroft, RA
- Herbert Furnival Waterhouse, MD, FRCS. Member of Council and Court of Examiners of the Royal College of Surgeons.
- William Watson, LLD.
- Edward Graham Wood, High Sheriff of Lancashire.
- John Aird.
- George Burn.
- George Bury.

=== The Most Illustrious Order of Saint Patrick ===
==== Knight of the Order of St Patrick (KP) ====
- Field-Marshal John French, Viscount French, GCB, OM, GCVO.

=== The Most Honourable Order of the Bath ===
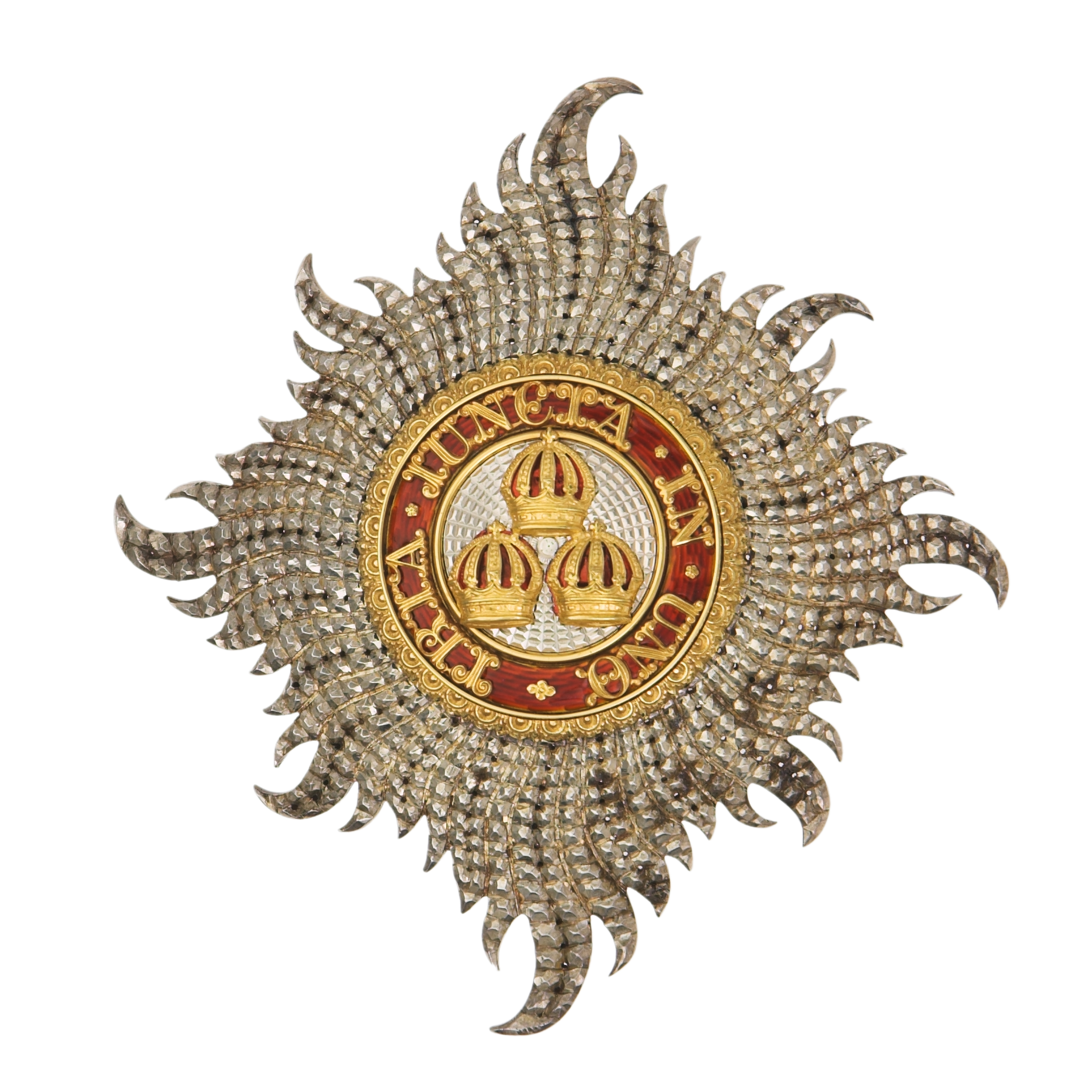
Civilian star of the Knight Grand Cross of the Order of the Bath

==== Knight Grand Cross of the Order of the Bath (GCB) ====
Civil Division

- Sir Thomas William Holderness, KCB, KCSI, Permanent Under Secretary of State for India.

==== Knight Commander of the Order of the Bath (KCB) ====
Military Division
Royal Navy

- Vice-Admiral Reginald Godfrey Otway Tupper, CVO, CB.
- Vice-Admiral Herbert Leopold Heath, CB, MVO.
- Vice-Admiral Montague Edward Browning, CB, MVO.
- Admiral James Startin, CB, (retired), temporary Commodore, RNR.

Army

- Major-General John Edward Capper, CB.
- Major-General Frederick William Nicholas McCracken, CB, DSO.
- Lieutenant-General Sir William Riddell Birdwood, KCSI, KCMG, CB, CIE, DSO.
- Major-General William Eliot Peyton, CVO, CB, DSO.
- Major-General Robert Fanshawe, CB, DSO.
- Major-General the Hon. Frederick Gordon, CB, DSO.
- Hon. Major-General Sir Eric Campbell Geddes.
- Colonel James Magill, CB, MD (ret. pay).
- Colonel and Hon. Major-General Charles Edward Callwell, CB (ret. pay).
- Major-General William Thomas Furse, CB, DSO.
- Lieutenant-Colonel Peter Johnston Freyer, CB, MD, Indian Medical Service, retired.
- Major-General Sir John Hanbury-Williams, KCVO, CMG.

Civil Division

- Frederick Atterbury, CB, Controller of H.M.'s Stationery Office.
- Sir Eyre Crowe, KCMG, CB, Assistant Under Secretary of State for Foreign Affairs.
- Sir Edward O'Farrell, CB, Assistant Under Secretary, Irish Office.
- Henry Frank Heath, CB, PhD, Secretary of the Department of Scientific and Industrial Research.
- William Francis Marwood, CB, Second Secretary, Board of Trade.
- David James Shackleton, CB, Permanent Secretary to the Ministry of Labour.
- Major-General Ivor Philipps, DSO, MP.
- Major Sir Edwin Frederick Wodehouse, KCVO, CB, Assistant Commissioner, Metropolitan Police.
- Colonel Sir Charles Wyndham-Murray, CB.

==== Companion of the Order of the Bath (CB) ====
Military Division

Royal Navy

- Rear-Admiral Archibald Peile Stoddart.
- Rear-Admiral Sydney Robert Fremantle, MVO.
- Captain Wilmot Stuart Nicholson.
- Captain Arthur Allan Morison Duff.
- Captain Francis Gerald St. John, MVO.
- Captain Walter Maurice Ellerton.
- Captain Tufton Percy Hamilton Beamish.
- Captain Hubert Henry Holland.
- Admiral John Locke Marx, DSO, MVO, (retired), temporary Captain, RNR.
- Vice-Admiral Charles Holcombe Dare, MVO, (retired).
- Rear-Admiral Thomas Webster Kemp, CIE, (retired).
- Engineer-Captain Charles Cape Sheen.
- Engineer-Captain Howard Bone.
- Surgeon-General George Welch.
- Fleet Surgeon John Menary, MD.
- Fleet Paymaster Richard Ernest Stanley Sturgess.
- Fleet Paymaster John Anthony Keys.
- Colonel (temporary Brigadier-General) Ernest Edward Chown, Royal Marine Light Infantry.
- Colonel Lewis Conway-Gordon, Royal Marine Artillery.

Army

- Brevet Colonel (temporary Brigadier-General) Thomas Edwin Scott, CIE, DSO, Indian Army.
- Lieutenant-Colonel Charles Arthur Johnston, DSO, MB, Indian Medical Service.
- Temporary Brigadier-General Henry Percy Maybury.
- Temporary Brigadier-General Philip Arthur Manley Nash.
- Colonel Trevor Patrick Breffney Ternan, CMG, DSO, retired pay.
- Colonel Edgar Alan Lambart.
- Lieutenant-Colonel and Brevet Colonel James Henry Gideon, retired pay.
- Colonel (temporary Brigadier-General) James Francis Erskine, CMG, MVO.
- Colonel (temporary Brigadier-General) Herbert Montgomery Campbell, CMG.
- Colonel (temporary Brigadier-General) Lewis Jones, CMG.
- Colonel Thomas Townley Macan, retired pay.
- Colonel William Baker Brown.
- Colonel (temporary Brigadier-General) Fiennes Henry Crampton, Royal Artillery.
- Colonel Roger Kirkpatrick, CMG, MD, Army Medical Service.
- Colonel (temporary Major-General) Hubert Armine Anson Livingstone, CMG.
- Colonel (temporary Brigadier-General) Ernest Makins, DSO.
- Colonel (temporary Brigadier-General) Hereward Llewelyn Roberts, MVO, Indian Army.
- Colonel Oswald Charles Williamson Oswald, Royal Garrison Artillery.
- Colonel Charles Henry Burtchaell, CMG, MB, Army Medical Service.
- Colonel John Joseph Gerrard, MB, Army Medical Service.
- Colonel (temporary Brigadier-General) Rion Philip Benson, CMG.
- Lieutenant-Colonel and Brevet Colonel Michael Graham Egerton Bowman-Manifold, DSO, Royal Engineers.
- Lieutenant-Colonel and Brevet Colonel (temporary Brigadier-General) Philip Richard Wood, CMG, Royal Irish Fusiliers.
- Lieutenant-Colonel and Brevet Colonel (temporary Brigadier-General) William Strong, Royal Artillery.
- Temporary Colonel Gerald Edward Holland, CMG, CIE, DSO.
- Temporary Colonel William Henry Willcox, CMG, MD, FRCP.
- Lieutenant-Colonel (temporary Colonel) George Washington Brazier-Creagh, CMG, late Royal Army Medical Corps.
- Lieutenant-Colonel (temporary Brigadier-General) David Finlay Hosken Logan, CMG, Royal Artillery.
- Lieutenant-Colonel (temporary Brigadier-General) Frederick Guy Maunsell, CMG, Royal Artillery.
- Colonel (temporary Brigadier-General) Thomas Walter, Viscount Hampden, CMG, Territorial Force (retired pay) (Major, Reserve of Officers).
- Lieutenant-Colonel (temporary Colonel) Hugh Fenwick Brooke, CMG, Army Service Corps.
- Lieutenant-Colonel (temporary Colonel) Hugh Stanley Thurston, CMG, Royal Army Medical Corps.
- Brevet Lieutenant-Colonel (temporary Brigadier-General) Gerald Frederic Trotter, CMG, MVO, DSO, Reserve of Officers, late Grenadier Guards.
- Major and Brevet Lieutenant-Colonel (temporary Brigadier-General) Henry Francis Edward Freeland, MVO, DSO, Royal Engineers.
- Major-General James Charles Young.
- Hon. Brigadier-General Walter Clare Savile, DSO.
- Colonel Henry Augustus Anley, Army Ordnance Department.
- Lieutenant-Colonel and Brevet Colonel Sir Bruce Gordon Seton, Bt, India Medical Service.
- Colonel Henry Walter Barrett (retired pay), Army Ordnance Department.
- Colonel (temporary Brigadier-General) Sir Henry Allen William Johnson, Bt. (retired pay).
- Colonel Douglas Wardrop, CVO, MB, Army Medical Service.
- Colonel (temporary Brigadier-General) Thomas Kelly Evans Johnston (retired pay).
- Colonel Charles Robert Tyrrell (retired pay), Army Medical Service.
- Colonel Clement Carr Wrigley, Army Ordnance Department.
- Lieutenant-Colonel and Brevet Colonel Lionel Richard Kenyon, Royal Garrison Artillery.
- Temporary Colonel James Galloway, MD, FRCP, FRCS, Army Medical Service.
- Lieutenant-Colonel (Hon. Surgeon-Colonel) Richard James Reece, MD, Honourable Artillery Company.
- Lieutenant-Colonel (temporary Colonel) George Samuel Bateson Lyle, Royal Garrison Artillery.
- Surgeon Lieutenant-Colonel Sir Warren Roland Crooke-Lawless, CIE, MD (retired pay), Royal Army Medical Corps.
- Lieutenant-Colonel (temporary Brigadier-General) Hon. Walter Dashwood Sclater Booth, DSO, Royal Artillery.
- Major and Brevet Lieutenant-Colonel (temporary Brigadier-General) Auckland Campbell Geddes, MD, Unattached List.

Australian Imperial Force

- Colonel (temporary Brigadier-General) Edwin Tivey, DSO, Commonwealth Military Forces.
- Colonel (temporary Brigadier-General) John Gellibrand, DSO, retired pay.
- Colonel (temporary Brigadier-General) Evan Alexander Wisdom, DSO.

Canadian Force

- Lieutenant-Colonel (temporary Brigadier-General) George Stuart Tuxford, CMG.
- Lieutenant-Colonel (temporary Brigadier-General) Archibald Cameron Macdonell, CMG, DSO.
- Colonel (temporary Brigadier-General) Alexander Duncan McRae, Canadian Military Forces.
- Colonel (temporary Brigadier-General) Percival Edward Thacker, CMG, Canadian Military Forces.

New Zealand Force

- Lieutenant-Colonel (temporary Brigadier-General) George Spafford Richardson, CMG, Staff Corps.

Civil Division

- William John Berry, Royal Corps of Naval Constructors.
- Herbert Cartwright Reid, Superintending Civil Engineer.
- Rear-Admiral Henry Harvey Bruce, MVO.
- Captain Frederick Charles Learmonth, RN.
- Captain Henry William Grant, RN.
- Captain Herbert Willes Webley Hope, RN.
- Captain Hubert Stansbury, RN, (retired).
- Acting Captain Cyril Percy Ryan, RN, (retired).
- Engineer-Captain John William Ham, RN.
- Temporary Surgeon-General Sir William Macewen, MD, RN.
- Temporary Surgeon-General George Robertson Turner, FRCS, RN.
- Colonel Frederick Horniblow, Officer in Charge of Army Service Corps Records.
- Lieutenant-Colonel Henry Gordon Leith, Department of the Chief Inspector of the Quartermaster-General's Services.
- Samuel Howard Whitbread, H.M. Lieutenant of the County of Bedford and President of the Bedfordshire Territorial Force Association.
- Lieutenant-Colonel Sir Charles John Owens, one of H.M.'s Lieutenants for the City of London and Chairman of the City of London Territorial Force Association.
- Sir James Bell, Bt, DL, Chairman of the Ayrshire Territorial Force Association.
- Major-General Trevor Bruce Tyler, CSI, DL, Chairman of the Glamorganshire Territorial Force Association.
- Major Thomas Alexander Harvie Anderson, Secretary of the City of Glasgow Territorial Force Association.
- Major Francis Malcolm Evory Kennedy, DL, Secretary of the Somersetshire Territorial Force Association.
- Francis Adolphus Jones, Legal Adviser to the Board of Agriculture.
- John Macpherson, Special Commissioner, Board of Control for Scotland.
- Herbert Henry Law, Chief Engineering Inspector, Local Government Board.
- George Atherton Aitken, Assistant Secretary, Home Office.
- Gerald Sydney Spicer, Senior Clerk, Foreign Office.
- Cyril Longhurst, Assistant Secretary, Committee of Imperial Defence.
- John Maynard Keynes, Acting Principal Clerk, Treasury.
- Charles Thomas Beard, ISO, Secretary, Irish Land Commission, Dublin.
- Sir Sydney Olivier, KCMG, Assistant Controller and Auditor.
- Ernest Arthur Gowers, Chief Inspector, National Health Insurance Commission.
- George Malcolm Young.
- Ernest Henry Bright, MVO, Senior Principal Clerk, H.M. Office of Works.
- Charles Hipwood, Assistant Secretary, Marine Department, Board of Trade.

=== The Most Exalted Order of the Star of India ===
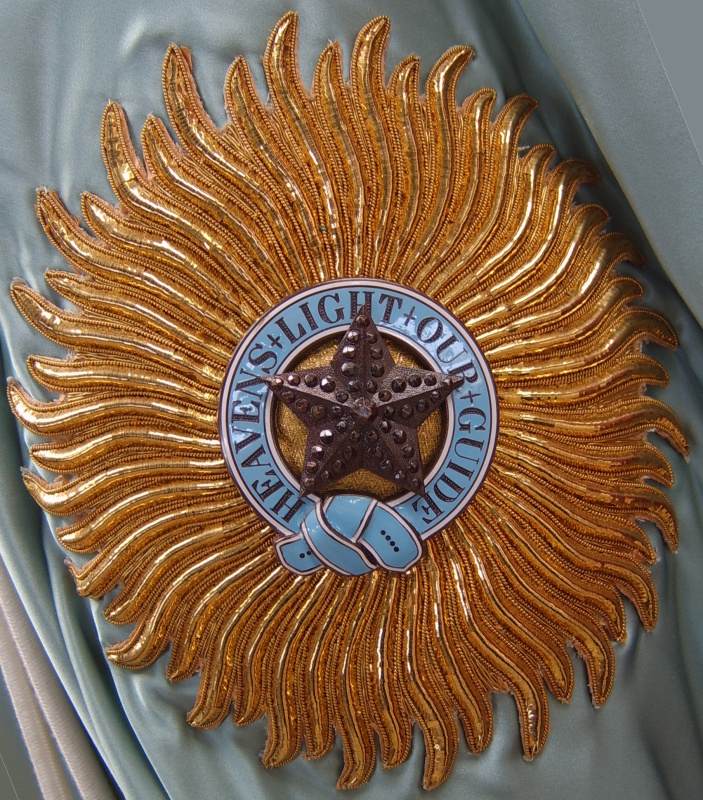
Star of a Knight Grand Commander of the Most Exalted Order of the Star of India.

==== Knight Grand Commander (GCSI) ====
- His Highness Maharao Raja Sawai Sir Khengarji Bahadur, GCIE, Rao of Cutch.

==== Knight Commander (KCSI) ====
- Sir Charles Edmund Fox, Chief Judge, Chief Court, Lower Burma.

==== Companion (CSI) ====
- Herbert Francis Webb Gillman, Indian Civil Service, an Ordinary Member of the Council of the Governor of Madras.
- Patrick James Fagan, Indian Civil Service, Financial Commissioner, Punjab, and a Member of the Council of the Lieutenant-Governor for making Laws and Regulations.
- Colonel Hormusjee Eduljee Banatvala, Indian Medical Service, Inspector-General of Civil Hospitals, Assam, and a Member of the Council of the Chief Commissioner for making Laws and Regulations.
- Lieutenant-Colonel Lawrence Impey, CIE, Indian Army, Political Department, Government of India, late Resident, Baroda.
- Colonel Benjamin William Marlow, CIE, Indian Army, Military Accounts Department, Military Accountant-General and Deputy Secretary to the Government of India, Finance Department, Military Finance Branch.
- Lieutenant-Colonel Harold Fenton Jacob, Indian Army, Political Department, First Assistant Resident at Aden, Bombay Presidency.
- Lieutenant-Colonel Francis Beville Prideaux, CIE, Indian Army, Political Department, Government of India, His Britannic Majesty's Consul for Seistan and Kain.

Honorary Companion

- His Highness Saiyid Taimur-Bin-Faisal, Sultan of Muscat and Oman.

=== The Most Distinguished Order of Saint Michael and Saint George ===
Star of the Order of Saint Michael and Saint George.

==== Knight Grand Cross of the Order of St Michael and St George (GCMG) ====
- The Right Honourable Lord D'Abernon, KCMG, Chairman of the Royal Commission on the Natural Resources, Trade and Legislation of certain portions of His Majesty's Dominions.
- Sir Francis Edmund Hugh Elliot, GCVO, KCMG, His Majesty's Envoy Extraordinary and Minister Plenipotentiary at Athens.

==== Knight Commander of the Order of St Michael and St George (KCMG) ====
- Colonel the Hon. James Burns, Member of the Legislative Council of New South Wales; in recognition of services to the Commonwealth of Australia.
- George Russell Clerk, CB, CMG, of the Foreign Office.
- Robert Alexander Falconer, LLD, DLitt, CMG, President of the University of Toronto.
- Herbert Guy Dering, MVO, His Majesty's Envoy Extraordinary and Minister Plenipotentiary at Bangkok.
- Sir Horace George Montagu Rumbold, Bt, MVO, His Majesty's Envoy Extraordinary and Minister Plenipotentiary at Berne.
- Herbert Edward White, CMG, His Majesty's Agent and Consul-General at Tangier.
- Vice-Admiral Charles Dundas of Dundas (retired).
- Surgeon-General Sir Arthur Thomas Sloggett, KCB, CMG, KHS.
- Major-General Percival Spearman Wilkinson, CB, CMG.
- Surgeon-General Francis Harper Treherne, CMG.
- Major-General Arthur Lynden Lynden-Bell, CB, CMG.
- Colonel (temporary Brigadier-General) Charles Massy Mathew, CB, CMG, DSO.
- Colonel (temporary Major-General) Walter de Sausmarez Cayley, CB, CMG.
- Surgeon General Tom Percy Woodhouse, CB.
- Major-General Spring Robert Rice, CB.
- Major-General Walter Campbell, CB, DSO.
- Major-General (temporary Lieutenant-General) Sir Philip Walhouse Chetwode, Bt, CB, DSO.
- Colonel (temporary Major-General) Arthur William Currie, CB, Canadian Forces.
- Colonel (temporary Major-General) Richard Ernest William Turner, VC, CB, DSO, Canadian Forces.

Awarded in recognition of valuable services in connection with the War

- Major-General Sir Francis Howard, KCB, CMG.
- Major-General Reginald Salmond Curtis, CB, CMG, DSO.
- Major-General James Milford Sutherland Brunker.
- Major-General Herbert Mullaly, CB, CSI.
- Major-General Edward Mabbott Woodward, CB.
- Colonel Robert Neil Campbell, CB, CIE, (retired). Indian Medical Service.

Honorary Knights Commander

- His Highness Abdul Jalil Nasruddin Muhtaram Shah, Sultan of Perak.
- Monsieur Charles le Comte de Sérionne, Agent Supérieur of the Suez Canal Company.

==== Companion of the Order of St Michael and St George (CMG) ====
- Raymond Cecil Allen, Director of Surveys and Land Officer, Uganda Protectorate.
- Graham Airdrie Bell, Financial Comptroller, Department of Railways and Canals, Dominion of Canada.
- Edgar Bonavia, Assistant Secretary to the Government, Malta.
- George Browne, ISO, Honorary Private Secretary to the Governor of Tasmania.
- Edward John Harding, MA, of the Colonial Office, Secretary to the Royal Commission on the Natural Resources, Trade and Legislation of certain portions of His Majesty's Dominions.
- Thomas Hood, Director of the Medical and Sanitary Service, Nigeria.
- Francis Edgar Kanthack, MInstC.E., Director of Irrigation, Union of South Africa.
- Frederic Truby King, MB, Medical Superintendent, Seacliff Mental Hospital, Dominion of New Zealand.
- John Pearce Luke, Mayor of Wellington, Dominion of New Zealand.
- William Harrison Moore, LLD, Dean of the Faculty of Law in the University of Melbourne.
- William Henry Walker, ISO, Assistant Under-Secretary of State for External Affairs, Dominion of Canada.
- Evelyn Wrench, Organiser of the Overseas Club.
- Neville Travers Borton Pasha, Postmaster-General in Egypt.
- Lieutenant-Colonel George Stewart Symes, DSO, of the Soudan Civil Service.
- Henry James Bruce, MVO, Second Secretary in His Majesty's Diplomatic Service.
- Reginald Francis Orlando Bridgeman, MVO, Second Secretary in His Majesty's Diplomatic Service.
- Lancelot Oliphant, of the Foreign Office.
- John Oliver Wardrop, His Majesty's Consul-General at Bergen.
- Captain Edward Cecil Villiers, RN.
- Captain Arthur Gordon Smith, RN.
- Captain Hubert Lynes, RN.
- Captain Francis Clifton Brown, RN.
- Captain Percival Henry Hall-Thompson, RN.
- Captain Roger Roland Charles Backhouse, RN, CB.
- Captain Frederick Parland Loder-Symonds, RN.
- Captain Barry Edward Domvile, RN.
- Captain Horace Walker Longden, RN.
- Captain William Bourchier Sherard Wrey, RN, (retired).
- Captain Francis Raton Travers, RN, (retired).
- Captain Reginald Francis Parker, RN, (retired).
- Captain John Pratt de Montmorency, RN, (retired).
- Captain Sir Malcolm MacGregor, Bt, RN, (retired).
- Captain David Monteith Hamilton, RN, (retired).
- Acting Captain Edward Louis Dalrymple Boyle, RN, (retired).
- Acting Captain Alfred Edward Hay Marescaux, RN, (retired).
- Acting Commander Charles Denniston Burney, RN.
- Commander Alfred Gilmore Alston, RN, (retired).
- Acting Commander Sir George Elliot Armstrong, Bt, RN, (retired).
- Fleet-Surgeon George Thompson Bishop, RN.
- Fleet-Paymaster William Ernest Russell Martin, RN.
- Paymaster-in-Chief Francis Cooke Alton, RN, (retired), CB.
- Paymaster-in-Chief Charles Edgar Byron, RN, (retired).
- Fleet-Paymaster Francis Hamilton Gerty, RN, (retired).
- Temporary Paymaster Harold Nevil Smart, RNVR.
- Temporary Lieutenant-Colonel Thomas Henry Hawkins, Royal Marine Light Infantry.
- Temporary Lieutenant-Colonel Charles Julian Thoroton, Royal Marine Light Infantry.

For services rendered in connection with Military Operations in the Field

- Major-General William Arthur Watson, CB, CIE, Indian Army.
- Colonel and Honorary Brigadier-General (temporary Major-General) Bertram Reveley Mitford, CB, DSO, Reserve of Officers.
- Temporary Brigadier-General Ralph Lewis Wedgwood, General List.
- Temporary Brigadier-General John William Stewart, General List.
- Lieutenant-Colonel and Brevet Colonel Cholmeley Edward Carl Branfill Harrison, retired pay, late Royal West Kent Regiment.
- Lieutenant-Colonel and Brevet Colonel Arthur Eardley-Wilmot, retired pay, late Royal Field Artillery.
- Colonel Edward Hugh Bethell, DSO, retired pay, late Royal Engineers.
- Lieutenant-Colonel and Brevet Colonel George William Maunsell, retired pay, late Royal West Kent Regiment.
- Lieutenant-Colonel and Brevet Colonel Robert Cotton Money, retired pay, late Yorkshire Light Infantry.
- Lieutenant-Colonel and Brevet Colonel Lionel Forde, retired pay, late Royal Artillery.
- Colonel Courtenay Clarke Manifold, CB, MB, Indian Medical Service.
- Colonel William James Smyth Fergusson, retired pay.
- Colonel (temporary Brigadier-General) Arthur William Gay, CB, DSO.
- Colonel (temporary Brigadier-General) John Arthur Stanford Tulloch, CB.
- Colonel (temporary Major-General) Henry Leycester Croker, CB.
- Colonel (temporary Brigadier-General) Henry Osman Vincent, CB.
- Colonel (temporary Brigadier-General) Edward Feetham, CB.
- Lieutenant-Colonel and Brevet Colonel (temporary Major-General) Geoffrey Percy Thynne Feilding, CB, DSO.
- Lieutenant-Colonel and Brevet Colonel (temporary Brigadier-General) Arthur James Poole, Royal Warwickshire Regiment.
- Colonel Denis Moriarty O'Callaghan, Army Medical Service.
- Colonel Alfred William Bewley, Army Medical Service.
- Colonel Ralph Arthur Kaye.
- Lieutenant-Colonel (temporary Colonel) Frederick James Greig, (retired pay), Reserve of Officers, late Royal Army Medical Corps.
- Lieutenant-Colonel George Scott, MB, (retired pay), late Royal Army Medical Corps.
- Lieutenant-Colonel Andrew Hosie, MD, (retired pay), late Royal Army Medical Corps.
- Lieutenant-Colonel Edward Watkin Wall, Indian Army.
- Lieutenant-Colonel (temporary Colonel) John Prestwich Blakeway, Royal Engineers.
- Lieutenant-Colonel (temporary Colonel) John Colpoys Connor, MB, Royal Army Medical Corps.
- Lieutenant-Colonel (temporary Colonel) Arthur Henry Orlando Lloyd, MVO, Yeomanry (late Captain, Grenadier Guards).
- Lieutenant-Colonel Charles Edward Thornton, Indian Army.
- Lieutenant-Colonel (temporary Brigadier-General) Garnier Norton Cartwright, DSO, Royal Artillery.
- Temporary Lieutenant-Colonel Arthur Dawson Milne, MB, East African Medical Service.
- Major and Brevet Lieutenant-Colonel (temporary Brigadier-General) H.S.R. Prince Alexander Augustus Frederick William Alfred George of Teck, GCB, GCVO, DSO, Life Guards.
- Lieutenant-Colonel (temporary Brigadier-General) The Hon. Lesley James Probyn Butler, DSO, Irish Guards.
- Lieutenant-Colonel (temporary Brigadier-General) Ernest Brandon Macnaghten, DSO, Royal Artillery.
- Lieutenant-Colonel (temporary Brigadier-General) William Fletcher Clemson, DSO, York and Lancaster Regiment.
- Major and Brevet Lieutenant-Colonel (temporary Brigadier-General) Robert McDouall, DSO, East Kent Regiment.
- Major and Brevet Lieutenant-Colonel (temporary Brigadier-General) Oliver de Lancey Williams, DSO, Royal Welsh Fusiliers.
- Lieutenant-Colonel (temporary Brigadier-General) George Moultrie Bullen-Smith, DSO, Leinster Regiment.
- Lieutenant-Colonel (temporary Brigadier-General) Henry Calvert Stanley-Clarke, DSO, Royal Artillery.
- Lieutenant-Colonel (temporary Brigadier-General) William Rushbrooke Eden, DSO, Royal Artillery.
- Major and Brevet Lieutenant-Colonel (temporary Brigadier-General) John Cartwright Harding-Newman, Essex Regiment.
- Lieutenant-Colonel (temporary Brigadier-General) Lewis Francis Philips, DSO, King's Royal Rifle Corps.
- Major and Brevet Lieutenant-Colonel Christopher Robert Berkeley, DSO, Welsh Regiment.
- Lieutenant-Colonel Alexander Inglis Robertson Glasfurd, DSO, Indian Army.
- Temporary Lieutenant-Colonel George Bridges, RA, DSO.
- Lieutenant-Colonel Ormonde de l'Épée Winter, DSO, Royal Field Artillery.
- Lieutenant-Colonel Edward Massy Birch, DSO, Royal Artillery.
- Major and Brevet Lieutenant-Colonel (temporary Lieutenant-Colonel) Barnett Dyer Lempriere Gray Anley, DSO, Manchester Regiment.
- Major and Brevet Lieutenant-Colonel The Hon. Richard Henn Collins, DSO, Royal Berkshire Regiment.
- Major and Brevet Lieutenant-Colonel Ross John Finnis Hayter, DSO, Cheshire Regiment, and Canadian Local Forces.
- Major and Brevet Lieutenant-Colonel (temporary Brigadier-General) Frank William Ramsay, DSO, Middlesex Regiment.
- Major and Brevet Lieutenant-Colonel Charles Otley Place, DSO, Royal Engineers.
- Major and Brevet Lieutenant-Colonel (temporary Brigadier-General) Montagu Leyland Hornby, DSO, retired pay, Indian Army.
- Major and Brevet Lieutenant-Colonel (temporary Brigadier-General) Richard Deare Furley Oldman, DSO, Norfolk Regiment.
- Major and Brevet Lieutenant-Colonel George Hanbury Noble Jackson, DSO, Border Regiment.
- Major and Brevet Lieutenant-Colonel (temporary Colonel) Joseph Frederick Laycock, DSO, Royal Horse Artillery, Territorial Force.
- Lieutenant-Colonel Harry Standish Bell, DSO, Royal Field Artillery.
- Major and Brevet Lieutenant-Colonel (temporary Lieutenant-Colonel) Philip James Vandeleur Kelly, DSO, attached Egyptian Army.
- Temporary Lieutenant-Colonel Francis Edward Metcalfe, DSO, Lincolnshire Regiment.
- Major (temporary Lieutenant-Colonel) Thomas Edward Topping, DSO, Royal Field Artillery.
- Major (temporary Lieutenant-Colonel) Gilbert John Acland-Troyte, DSO, King's Royal Rifle Corps.
- Major (temporary Lieutenant-Colonel) Richard James Campbell Thompson, DSO, Royal Army Medical Corps.
- Temporary Lieutenant-Colonel Claude George Cole-Hamilton, DSO, Reserve of Officers, late Royal Irish Rifles.
- Temporary Major Sir Philip Albert Gustave David Sassoon, Bt, Yeomanry.

Australian Forces

- Colonel (temporary Brigadier-General) Charles Rosenthal, CB, Artillery.
- Colonel Reuter Emerick Roth, DSO, Army Medical Corps.
- Colonel Julius Henry Bruche, Special Service Section.
- Colonel (temporary Brigadier-General) George Jameson Johnston, CB, Artillery.
- Colonel (temporary Brigadier-General) Harold William Grimwade.
- Lieutenant-Colonel Herbert William Lloyd, DSO, Artillery.

Canadian Forces

- Colonel (temporary Major-General) Henry Edward Burstall, CB, Canadian Local Forces.
- Colonel (temporary Brigadier-General) Frederick Oscar Warren Loomis, DSO, Infantry.
- Colonel Reginald Frank Manley Sims, DSO, General List.
- Lieutenant-Colonel (temporary Brigadier-General) James Harold Elmsley, DSO, Dragoons.
- Lieutenant-Colonel (temporary Brigadier-General) Edward Hilliam, DSO, Infantry.
- Lieutenant-Colonel (temporary Brigadier-General) Victor Wentworth Odium, DSO, Infantry.
- Lieutenant-Colonel Charles Hamilton Mitchell, DSO, Headquarters Staff, attached Imperial Army.
- Lieutenant-Colonel Gilbert Edward Sanders, DSO, Pioneer Battalion.
- Lieutenant-Colonel (temporary Major-General) David Watson, CB, attached Canadian Headquarters.

New Zealand Forces

- Lieutenant-Colonel Charles Ernest Randolph Mackesy, DSO, Rifle Brigade.
- Lieutenant-Colonel Geoffrey Samuel Smith, DSO.
- Infantry Lieutenant-Colonel Ivon Tatham Standish, DSO, Field Artillery.

For valuable services in connection with the War

- Colonel (temporary Brigadier-General) Hon. Osbert Victor George Atheling Lumley.
- Colonel (temporary Brigadier-General) Edmund Gustavus Nicolls, CB.
- Colonel (temporary Brigadier-General) Capel Molyneux Brunker, DSO.
- Colonel (temporary Brigadier-General) George Henry Cooper Colomb, Indian Army.
- Colonel (temporary Brigadier-General) George Joseph FitzMaurice Soady, Indian Army.
- Colonel Walter Coote Hedley, CB.
- Colonel (temporary Brigadier-General) Richard Fielding Edwards.
- Colonel (Hon. Brigadier-General) James Edward Wilmot Smyth Caulfeild (retired pay).
- Colonel (temporary Brigadier-General) Edward Benjamin Appelbe, CB, (retired pay), Army Ordnance Depot.
- Colonel (Hon. Brigadier-General) Morey Quayle Jones, CB (retired pay).
- Colonel (Hon. Brigadier-General) Francis Algernon Curteis, CB (retired pay).
- Colonel (Hon. Brigadier-General) Walpole Swinton Kays (retired pay).
- Colonel (temporary Brigadier-General) Frederick Paul English, DSO.
- Colonel Thomas Joseph Kearns, CB, (retired pay), Army Service Corps.
- Colonel (temporary Brigadier-General) Alexander Hugh Cowie (retired pay).
- Colonel George de Sausmarez de Lisle (retired pay), Indian Army.
- Colonel (temporary Brigadier-General) Harold Maxwell Grenfell, MVO (retired pay), Reserve of Officers.
- Colonel (temporary Major-General) Frederick Gore Anley, CB.
- Lieutenant-Colonel and Brevet Colonel (temporary Brigadier-General) Robert James Ross.
- Lieutenant-Colonel (temporary Colonel) Bernard William Lynedoch McMahon, Durham Light Infantry.
- Lieutenant-Colonel Charles Robert Crosse, MVO, retired pay, late Royal West Kent Regiment.
- Lieutenant-Colonel and Hon. Colonel Philip Carlebach, London Regiment.
- Lieutenant-Colonel Terence Humphrys Sweeny, FRCSI, (retired), India Medical Service.
- Lieutenant-Colonel Francis Frederic Perry, CIE, FRCS, (retired), India Medical Service.
- Lieutenant-Colonel Joshua Chaytor-White, MD, (retired), India Medical Service.
- Lieutenant-Colonel Richard Percy Robinson-Embury, late Royal Field Artillery.
- Lieutenant-Colonel Sidney Browning Smith, India Medical Service.
- Lieutenant-Colonel John Norman MacLeod, CIE, MB, FRCS, (retired), India Medical Service.
- Lieutenant-Colonel Charles Conran East, Reserve of Officers, Royal Warwickshire Regiment.
- Lieutenant-Colonel (Hon. Colonel) Lancelot Robson, DSO, Royal Garrison Artillery.
- Lieutenant-Colonel William Garner, Middlesex Regiment.
- Lieutenant-Colonel (temporary Colonel) Christopher George Oldfield, Reserve of Officers, late Royal Garrison Artillery.
- Lieutenant-Colonel Charles Edward Fraser Copeman, Cambridgeshire Regiment.
- Lieutenant-Colonel (temporary Colonel) Henry William Manwaring Parker, retired pay, Reserve of Officers, late Royal Garrison Artillery.
- Temporary Lieutenant-Colonel Arthur William Crossley, DSc, FRS, attached Royal Engineers.
- Lieutenant-Colonel David Harvey, MD, Royal Army Medical Corps.
- Major and Brevet Lieutenant-Colonel (temporary Brigadier-General) Harry Osborne Mance, DSO, Royal Engineers.
- Major and Brevet Lieutenant-Colonel Ralph Ernest Haweis James, North Lancashire Regiment.
- Major and Brevet Lieutenant-Colonel Frank William Rowland Hill, DSO, Army Ordnance Department.
- Lieutenant-Colonel Frank Lennox Galloway, Royal Garrison Artillery.
- Major and Brevet Lieutenant-Colonel William Henry Bartholomew, Royal Artillery.
- Major and Brevet Lieutenant-Colonel (temporary Lieutenant-Colonel) Charles Newenham French, Hampshire Regiment.
- Temporary Hon. Lieutenant-Colonel Mervyn Henry Gordon, MD, Royal Army Medical Corps.
- Major and Brevet Lieutenant-Colonel (temporary Brigadier-General) John Maitland Salmond, DSO, Royal Lancaster Regiment and Royal Flying Corps.
- Lieutenant-Colonel (temporary Colonel) Frank Beauchamp Macaulay Chatterton, Army Service Corps.
- Temporary Major (temporary Lieutenant-Colonel) James MacGregor, Royal Engineers.
- Temporary Lieutenant-Colonel Edward Frank Harrison, General List.
- Major William George Lyddon, Royal Garrison Artillery.
- Major Patrick Stanislaus O'Reilly, Royal Army Medical Corps.
- Major (temporary Lieutenant-Colonel) Francis Slater Picot, retired pay.
- Major Philippe-Henri du Perron Casgrain (retired pay), Reserve of Officers, late Royal Engineers.
- Major (temporary Lieutenant-Colonel) Hermann Luhrs, Northumberland Fusiliers.
- Major George Alfred Duncan Harvey, Royal Army Medical Corps.
- Major (temporary Lieutenant-Colonel) Henry Ramsden (retired pay), Reserve of Officers, late Royal Artillery.
- Temporary Major Walter Gordon Wilson, Machine Gun Corps.
- Temporary Major Adrian Francis Hugh Sibbald Simpson, Royal Engineers.
- Major (temporary Lieutenant-Colonel) Guy Livingstone, London Regiment and Royal Flying Corps.
- Temporary Major Archibald Douglas Reid, Royal Army Medical Corps.
- Temporary Lieutenant-Colonel Herbert William Kempster, Army Service Corps, Special Reserve.
- Temporary Lieutenant-Colonel Sir Samuel John Gurney Hoare, Bt, Yeomanry.

Australian Forces

- Lieutenant-Colonel Percy Phipps Abbott, Light Horse Regiment.
- Lieutenant-Colonel William Thornborough Hayward, Australian Army Medical Corps.
- Lieutenant-Colonel Thomas Ernest Victor Hurley, Australian Army Medical Corps.
- Colonel Reginald Jeffery Millard, Australian Army Medical Corps.
- Major (temporary Lieutenant-Colonel) George Wall, General List, Australian Imperial Force.
- Lieutenant-Colonel Herbert James Wright, Australian Imperial Forces (Staff).

Canadian Forces

- Colonel Charles Alfred Hodgetts, Canadian Army Medical Corps.
- Colonel (temporary Brigadier-General) Joseph Philippe Landry, Canadian Military Forces.
- Colonel (temporary Brigadier-General) Frank Stephen Meighen, Canadian Military Forces.
- Colonel Charles Allan Smart, Canadian Military Forces.
- Lieutenant-Colonel Harold French McDonald, DSO, Canadian Military Forces.

New Zealand Forces

- Lieutenant-Colonel (temporary Colonel) Noel Percy Adams, attached Field Artillery.
- Lieutenant-Colonel Norman Fitzherbert, Wellington Regiment.
- Lieutenant-Colonel James William Hutchen, Army Pay Corps.
- Lieutenant-Colonel (temporary Colonel) Harry Rowland Potter, Staff Corps.

=== The Most Eminent Order of the Indian Empire ===
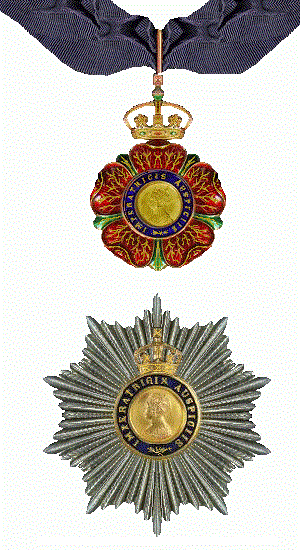
Riband, badge and star of the Knight Grand Commander of the Order of the Indian Empire

==== Knight Grand Commander (GCIE) ====
- Sir Michael Francis O'Dwyer, KCSI, Indian Civil Service, Lieutenant-Governor of the Punjab.
- Lieutenant-Colonel Sir George Olof Roos-Keppel, KCSI, KCIE, Indian Army, Chief Commissioner and Agent to the Governor-General, North-West Frontier Province.
- Sir Gulam Muhammad Ali, Khan Bahadur, KCIE, Prince of Arcot, Madras Presidency, an Additional Member of the Council of the Governor for making Laws and Regulations.

==== Knight Commander (KCIE) ====
- Mahadev Bhaskar Chaubal, CSI, an Ordinary Member of the Council of the Governor of Bombay.
- James Walker, CIE, Indian Civil Service, Commissioner, Nerbudda Division, Central Provinces, and an Additional Member of the Council of the Governor-General for making Laws and Regulations.
- Abbas Ali Baig, CSI, LLD, lately a Member of the Council of the Secretary of State for India.
- His Highness Raja Bijay Chand, CSI, of Bilaspur, Punjab.
- Nawab Khan Bahadur Sahibzada Abdul Qayyum, CIE, Assistant Political Agent, Khyber, North-West Frontier Province.
- Sardar Bahadur Sardar Shamsher Singh, CIE, Chief Minister, Jind State, Punjab.

==== Companion (CIE) ====
- Colonel Shafto Longfield Craster, Royal Engineers, lately Agent, North-Western Railway, India.
- Sidney Robert Hignell, Indian Civil Service, Deputy Secretary to the Government of India in the Home Department.
- Denys de Saumarez Bray, Indian Civil Service, Deputy Secretary to the Government of India, Foreign and Political Department.
- Henry Phillips Tollinton, Indian Civil Service, Deputy Commissioner, Lahore.
- James MacKenna, Indian Civil Service, Agricultural Adviser to the Government of India, and Director of the Pusa Institute.
- Edward Lister, Indian Civil Service, late Deputy Commissioner of Hazaribagh, Bihar and Orissa.
- Lieutenant-Colonel David Waters Sutherland, MD, MRCP, FRS, Indian Medical Service, Principal, Medical College and School, Lahore, Punjab.
- Reginald Isidore Robert Glancy, Indian Civil Service, Assistant Minister of Finance, His Highness the Nizam's Government.
- Arthur Willsteed Cook, Indian Civil Service, Magistrate and Collector, Bankura, Bengal.
- Thomas Eyebron Moir, Indian Civil Service, Private Secretary to His Excellency the Governor of Madras.
- James Crerar, Indian Civil Service, Private Secretary to His Excellency the Governor of Bombay.
- Henry Robert Crosthwaite, Central Provinces Commission, Registrar, Co-operative Credit Societies, Central Provinces.
- Hilary Lushington Holman-Hunt, AMICE, Public Works Department, Executive Engineer, Twante Canal Division, Burma.
- Gerald Aylmer Levett-Yeats, ISO, Opium Department, Factory Superintendent, Ghazipur, United Provinces.
- Raj Bahadur Hari Ram Goenka, Sheriff of Calcutta.
- Taw Sein Ko, ISO, MRAS, FAI, FSA, Superintendent, Archaeological Survey, and Examiner in Chinese, Burma.
- Jivanji Jamshedji Modi, Shams-ul-Ulama, JP, of Bombay.
- Dewan Bahadur Pandit Krishna Rao Luxman Paonaskar, Chief Member of Council, Kishangarh State, Rajputana.
- Dewan Bahadur Krishnarajapuram Pallegondai Puttanna Chetty, President of the Municipal Council of Bangalore City, Mysore.
- Lieutenant-Colonel John Anderson, MB, Indian Medical Service (retired), Member of Medical Board at the India Office.
- Robert Glover Jaquet, Deputy Accountant-General at the India Office.
- Major (temporary Lieutenant-Colonel) Ralph Ellis Carr-Hall, Indian Army, Military Accounts Department, Field Controller, Poona.
- Lieutenant-Colonel Alexander Hierom Ogilvy Spence, Indian Army, 39th King George's Own Central India Horse, Deputy Secretary to the Government of India in the Army Department.
- Lieutenant-Colonel Charles Albert Edmond O'Meara, Indian Army, Director and Superintendent, Army Clothing Department, India.
- Lieutenant-Colonel Godfrey Lambert Carter, Indian Army, Commandant, 106th Hazara Pioneers.
- Lieutenant-Colonel Ernest Arthur Frederick Redl, Indian Army, 113th Infantry, Military Attaché at Meshed, Persia.
- Chief Engineer Thomas Henry Knight, Royal Indian Marine, Inspector of Machinery, Bombay Dockyard.
- Harry Seymour Hoyle Pilkington, MVO, Postmaster-General, Bombay.
- James Alexander Ossory Fitzpatrick, LLB, Indian Civil Service, Political Agent, Wano, North-West Frontier Province.
- Major David Lockhart Robertson Lorimer, Indian Army, Political Department, Government of India, His Majesty's Consul, Kerman and Persian Baluchistan, and ex-officio Assistant to the Political Resident, Persian Gulf.
- Major Terence Humphrey Keyes, Indian Army, Political Department, Government of India.
- Captain Harold Hay Thorburn, Indian Medical Service, serving with the South Persia Rifles, Shiraz.
- Captain George Ambrose Lloyd, DSO, MP, Warwickshire Yeomanry, sometime Special Commissioner for His Majesty's Government to enquire into and report upon the future of British trade in Turkey, Mesopotamia, and Persian Gulf.

=== The Royal Victorian Order ===
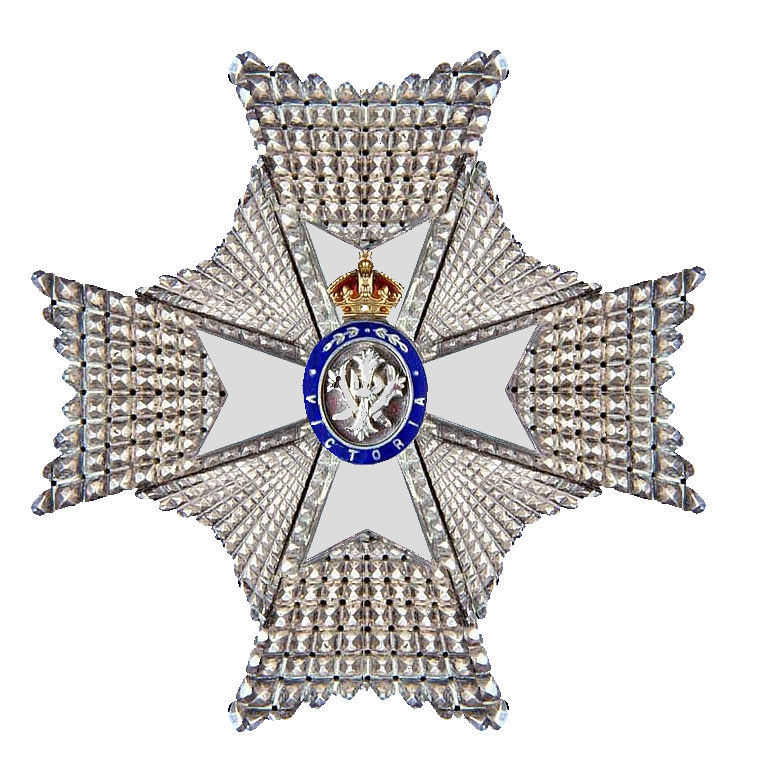
Insignia of a Knight / Dames Commander of the Royal Victorian Order

==== The Royal Victorian Chain ====
- Archibald Philip, Earl of Rosebery, KG, KT, PC.

==== Knight Grand Cross of the Royal Victorian Order (GCVO) ====
- The Rt. Hon. Sir Francis John Stephens Hopwood, GCB, GCMG.

==== Knight Commander of the Royal Victorian Order (KCVO) ====
- Sir Maurice Bonham Carter, KCB.

==== Commander of the Royal Victorian Order (CVO) ====
- Charles Alexander Harris, CB, CMG, MVO.
- Francis Herman Lucas, CB.
- Herbert James Creedy, CB, MVO.
- Harry Lloyd-Verney, MVO.
- Richard Robert Cruise, FRCS (England).

==== Member of the Royal Victorian Order, 4th class (MVO) ====
- Edward Denny Bacon.
- Arthur James Forrest.
- Captain Charles Alexander Lindsay Irvine.
- Major Charles Standish Paulet (Dated 18 May 1917.)

=== Distinguished Service Order (DSO) ===
Awarded a Bar to the Distinguished Service Order

- Major (Temporary Lieutenant-Colonel) Arthur Ellis Fowke Harris, DSO, Royal Berkshire Regiment.
- Major Herbert Hulseberg, DSO, Indian Army.
- Captain and Brevet Major Walter Carandini Wilson, DSO, MC, Leicestershire Regiment.

Awarded in recognition of their services in the prosecution of the war

- Admiral Alexander William Chisholm-Batten, MVO, (temporary Captain, Royal Navy Reserve).
- Admiral John Denison (temporary Captain, Royal Navy Reserve).
- Admiral Sir Alfred Wyndham Paget, KCB, KCMG, (temporary Captain, Royal Navy Reserve).
- Vice-Admiral Arthur Calvert Clarke, CMG, (temporary Captain, Royal Navy Reserve).
- Vice-Admiral Frederick Owen Pike (temporary Captain, Royal Navy Reserve).
- Captain William Francis Benwell, RN.
- Captain Edmund Clifton Carver, RN.
- Commander Wion de Malpas Egerton, RN.
- Commander Francis Alexander Waddilove Buller, RN.
- Commander Malcolm Lennon Goldsmith, RN.
- Commander Fischer Surges Watson, RN.
- Commander Miles Brock Birkett, RN.
- Commander Morton Smart, RNVR.
- Lieutenant-Commander Bertram Chalmers Watson, RN.
- Acting Lieutenant-Commander Maurice MacMahon, RNR.

Awarded the Distinguished Service Order

- Major (temporary Lieutenant Colonel) David Ahern, Royal Army Medical Corps.
- Reverend David Aherne, Temporary Chaplain to the Forces, 3rd Class, Army Chaplains' Department.
- Lieutenant (temporary Major) William John Alderman, Royal West Kent Regiment.
- Lieutenant-Colonel (temporary Colonel) John Donald Alexander, MB, Royal Army Medical Corps.
- Captain (temporary Major) James Gibb Allan, Royal Engineers.
- Captain (acting Major) Charles Donald Allderidge, Royal Garrison Artillery.
- Captain (temporary Major) Edward Mortimer Allfrey, Royal Berkshire Regiment.
- Lieutenant-Colonel William Henry Loraine Allgood, H.P. late King's Royal Rifle Corps.
- Major Thomas Gayer Anderson, Royal Field Artillery.
- Lieutenant (temporary Captain) William Anderson, MC, Northumberland Fusiliers.
- Captain (temporary Major) John Owen Andrews, Army Veterinary Corps.
- Major Robert Abercrombie Anstruther, Royal Field Artillery.
- Temporary Major Henry Aplin, Royal Munster Fusiliers.
- Major Arthur Somerville Archdale, Royal Field Artillery.
- Major Edward Percy Argyle, Army Veterinary Corps.
- Major (temporary Lieutenant-Colonel) Edward Armstrong, Highland Light Infantry.
- Major and Brevet Lieutenant-Colonel Cecil Faber Aspinall, CMG, Royal Munster Fusiliers.
- Temporary Lieutenant-Colonel John Atkinson, Army Service Corps.
- Lieutenant-Colonel (temporary Colonel) Henry Joseph Axe, Army Veterinary Corps.
- Captain (temporary Lieutenant-Colonel) Gerald Eliot Badcock, Army Service Corps.
- Temporary Captain Philip Henry Bahr, MD, Royal Army Medical Corps.
- Lieutenant (acting Lieutenant-Colonel) William Henry Goldney Baker, Indian Army.
- Lieutenant-Colonel Arthur Macintosh Balfour, Royal Field Artillery.
- Major (temporary Lieutenant-Colonel) Percy Balfour, Bedfordshire Regiment, Special Reserve.
- Captain Frecheville Hubert Ballantine-Dykes, Retired List, late Scots Guards.
- Temporary Major Arthur Prier Woodburn Bamberger, Army Service Corps.
- Lieutenant-Colonel Harold John Kinahan Bamfield, Indian Medical Service.
- Major John Arthur Murray Bannerman, Royal Warwickshire Regiment.
- Captain (acting Major) William George Frederick Barnard, East Kent Regiment, Special Reserve.
- Major Nathaniel Albert Delap Barton, Army Service Corps, retired pay, late Connaught Rangers.
- Captain (acting Major) Edward John Bather, Royal Field Artillery.
- Temporary Major George Johnstone Baugh, Royal Engineers.
- Major (acting Lieutenant-Colonel) James Henry Mountifort Beasley, Royal Garrison Artillery.
- Lieutenant-Colonel Guy Archibald Hastings Beatty, Indian Army.
- Major (acting Lieutenant-Colonel) George Ernest Beatty-Pownall, Border Regiment.
- Major (temporary Lieutenant-Colonel) Henry Wrixon Becher, retired pay, late West Riding Regiment.
- Captain and Brevet Major (temporary Lieutenant-Colonel) Edward Henry Lionel Beddington, MC, Lancers.
- Temporary Lieutenant-Colonel John George Beharrell, General List.
- Temporary Major Charles Francis Bell, Army Service Corps.
- Temporary Major Charles Vincent Bellamy, Royal Engineers (late Major, Territorial Force Reserve).
- Temporary Captain William Wedgwood Benn. Yeomanry, (attached Royal Naval Air Service).
- 2nd Lieutenant (temporary Major and acting Lieutenant Colonel) Philip Eric Bent, Leicestershire Regiment.
- Major Robert Esme Berkeley, North Lancashire Regiment.
- Lieutenant-Colonel (temporary Brigadier-General) Ralph Abercrombie Berners, Royal Welsh Fusiliers.
- Quartermaster and Hon. Lieutenant (temporary Captain) James Betts, Army Gymnastic Staff.
- Captain (temporary Lieutenant-Colonel) Ralph Charles Bingham, Reserve of Officers, late Coldstream Guards (Machine Gun Guards).
- Major (temporary Colonel) Charles Folliott Birney, Royal Engineers.
- Captain and Brevet Major Guy Blewitt, MC, Oxfordshire and Buckinghamshire Light Infantry.
- Major George Montgomery Bond, Yorkshire Light Infantry.
- Major George Oldroyd Borwick, Yeomanry.
- Lieutenant-Colonel (temporary Colonel) Arthur Winniett Nunn-Bowen, Royal Army Medical Corps.
- Captain Harold Boyd-Rochfort, Lancers.
- Captain (temporary Lieutenant-Colonel) The Hon. John David Boyle, Rifle Brigade, and Royal Flying Corps.
- Captain John Banks Brady, King's Royal Rifle Corps, Special Reserve.
- Temporary Major John Braithwaite, Graves Registration Section.
- Major James Donaldson Dulany Brancker, Royal Garrison Artillery.
- 2nd Lieutenant (temporary Major) Walter Guy Nicholas Breton, Royal Garrison Artillery.
- Captain (temporary Major) John Henry Bridcutt, Royal Irish Rifles.
- Major and Brevet Lieutenant-Colonel (temporary Lieutenant-Colonel) Arthur Holroyd Bridges, Indian Army.
- Major Roland Harley Bridges, Royal Army Medical Corps.
- Captain (temporary Major) Ernest Briggs, Royal Engineers.
- Temporary Captain (acting Major) Robert Wilson Brims, Royal Engineers.
- Major Charles Noel Frank Broad, Royal Artillery.
- Temporary Lieutenant-Colonel George Frank Brooke, retired list, late Connaught Rangers.
- Reverend Frederick E. Brown, Temporary Chaplain to the Forces, 3rd Class, Army Chaplains' Department.
- Captain (acting Major) Louis Noel Francis Brown, Royal Garrison Artillery.
- Captain (temporary Major) William Reid Brown, Royal Garrison Artillery.
- Captain (acting Major) Cecil Alexander Little Brownlow, Royal Field Artillery.
- Major (acting Lieutenant-Colonel) Frederick Carkeet Bryant, CMG, Royal Field Artillery.
- Captain (acting Major) Ernest Frederick Budden, Royal Field Artillery.
- Captain (temporary Major) Charles Berthold Bullough, Retired pay, late Royal Garrison Artillery.
- Major Valentine Rodolphe Burkhardt, Royal Field Artillery.
- Major (temporary Lieutenant-Colonel) Norman George Burnand, Leinster Regiment.
- Temporary Major Charles Gerald Bush, Army Service Corps.
- Major Stephen Seymour Butler, South Staffordshire Regiment.
- Major John George Cadell, Indian Army.
- Major (temporary Lieutenant-Colonel) Edward Cadman Cadman, East Lancashire Regiment.
- Major James Black Cameron, Royal Garrison Artillery.
- Major Orford Somerville Cameron, Retired pay, late Royal Field Artillery.
- Temporary Lieutenant-Colonel Robert Ormus Campbell, Royal Welsh Fusiliers.
- Major and Brevet Lieutenant-Colonel (temporary Lieutenant-Colonel) Arthur Basil Carey, CMG, Royal Engineers.
- Captain and Brevet Major John Rogers Cartwright, Devonshire Regiment.
- Captain Francis Casement, MB, Royal Army Medical Corps.
- Temporary Major Clement H. Langston Cazalet, General List.
- Temporary Lieutenant-Colonel James Henry Chadwick, Manchester Regiment.
- Temporary Major Kenneth Miles Chance, Border Regiment.
- Captain and Brevet Major (temporary Lieutenant-Colonel) Richard Chester Chester-Master, Retired pay, late King's Royal Rifle Corps.
- Temporary Major Oliver Cecil Clare, MC, East Surrey Regiment.
- Captain and Brevet Major (temporary Lieutenant-Colonel) Albert Edward Stanley Clarke, MVO, Retired list, late Scots Guards.
- Captain and Brevet Major (temporary Lieutenant-Colonel) Bowcher Campbell Senhouse Clarke, Worcestershire Regiment.
- Major Charles James Clarke, Royal Engineers.
- Temporary Lieutenant (acting Major) Douglas Whyte Cleaver, Royal Garrison Artillery.
- Temporary Lieutenant-Colonel The Hon. Arthur Reginald Clegg-Hill, Cheshire Regiment.
- Major Harry Oliver Coker, Rhodesia Regiment.
- Captain (acting Major) Percy Robert Murdoch Collins, Royal Garrison Artillery.
- Lieutenant (temporary Major) Laurence Andrew Common, Royal Field Artillery.
- Major (acting Lieutenant-Colonel) Clifton Graham Astley Cooper, Royal Field Artillery.
- Major Gordon Saxton Cooper, Royal Artillery.
- Temporary Captain (temporary Lieutenant-Colonel) Lyall Newcomen Cooper, Royal Engineers.
- Lieutenant (temporary Major) Reginald Alfred Cooper, Yeomanry and Royal Flying Corps (late Captain, Dragoon Guards).
- Major (temporary Lieutenant-Colonel) Arthur Cecil Corfe, South African Defence Force (commanding Battalion, Royal West Kent Regiment).
- Captain and Brevet Major James Handyside Marshall Cornwall, MC, Royal Field Artillery.
- Captain (temporary Major) Eric Boyd Costin, West Yorkshire Regiment.
- Major (acting Lieutenant-Colonel) Thomas Scott Cotgrave, Army Service Corps.
- 2nd Lieutenant (acting Major) Herbert Cottee, Royal Field Artillery.
- Major (acting Lieutenant-Colonel) Edmond Brian Cotter, Royal Garrison Artillery.
- Captain (acting Major) Arthur Foulkes Baglietto Cottrell, Royal Field Artillery.
- Temporary Major Frank Thomas Cox, Army Service Corps.
- Lieutenant-Colonel William Thomas Cox, Royal Field Artillery.
- Captain (temporary Major) Noel Newman Lombard Craig, Army Service Corps.
- Captain (temporary Major) William Anderson Watson Crellin, Nottinghamshire and Derbyshire Regiment.
- Major Charles William Cripps, Royal Field Artillery.
- Major (temporary Lieutenant-Colonel) John Patrick Glandore Crosbie, Rifle Brigade.
- 2nd Lieutenant (acting Major) Ernest Crouch, Durham Light Infantry.
- Lieutenant-Colonel (temporary Brigadier-General) Hanway Robert Cumming, Durham Light Infantry.
- Major John Sydney Cunningham, Middlesex Regiment.
- Temporary Major (acting Lieutenant-Colonel) John William Danielsen, Royal Engineers (Captain, Royal Engineers, Territorial Force).
- Major Lionel Edward Hamilton Marmaduke Darell, Life Guards.
- Major Arthur James Darlington, Royal Engineers.
- Lieutenant-Colonel Keith Maitland Davie, Gloucestershire Regiment.
- Lieutenant-Colonel Harry Miller Davson, Royal Field Artillery.
- Captain (acting Lieutenant-Colonel) Henry King Dawson, MD, Royal Army Medical Corps.
- Temporary Major Robert William Day, General List, late Army Service Corps.
- Major (temporary Lieutenant-Colonel) Percy Christopher de la Pryme, Army Service Corps.
- Major George Arthur Delmé-Murray, Shropshire Light Infantry.
- Temporary Major Thomas Sydney Dick, Machine Gun Corps.
- Reverend Lenthall Greville Dickenson, Temporary Chaplain to the Forces, 3rd Class, Army Chaplains Department
- Captain Douglas Povah Dickinson, MC, Welsh Regiment.
- Captain Melville Dinwiddie, MC, Gordon Highlanders.
- Major Richard Conway Dobbs, Royal Irish Fusiliers.
- Captain Edward James Dolphin, London Regiment.
- Major (acting Lieutenant-Colonel) Reginald John Done, Royal Engineers.
- Captain (acting Major) Thomas Donnelly, Royal Garrison Artillery.
- Major (acting Lieutenant-Colonel) Stephen John Donovan, Army Service Corps.
- Major (temporary Lieutenant-Colonel) Leslie Claud Dorman, Worcestershire Regiment.
- Captain Stanley Douglas Douglas-Jones, MC, Royal Garrison Artillery.
- Temporary Major Joseph Aloysius Downey, Durham Light Infantry.
- Captain (acting Lieutenant-Colonel) Percy Bates Dresser, Royal Field Artillery.
- Major James Syme Drew, MC, Cameron Highlanders.
- Major (temporary Lieutenant-Colonel) Benjamin Howard Vella Dunbar, MD, Royal Army Medical Corps.
- Temporary Lieutenant-Colonel James Fergus Duncan, Royal Artillery (Captain, Territorial Force).
- Major James Colin Dundas, Royal Field Artillery.
- Temporary Lieutenant-Colonel Robert William Layard Dunlop, Royal Field Artillery (Lieutenant-Colonel and Honorary Colonel, Bombay Volunteer Rifles).
- Captain and Brevet Major John Alexander Dunnington-Jefferson. Royal Fusiliers.
- Major (temporary Lieutenant-Colonel) Osmond Charteris du Port, retired pay, late Royal Artillery.
- Major (temporary Lieutenant-Colonel) Richard Broadhurst Dutton, Royal Engineers.
- Temporary Captain James Jameson Dwyer, Royal Army Medical Corps.
- Major (temporary Lieutenant-Colonel) Louis Morgan Dyson, retired pay, late Royal Artillery.
- Major (acting Lieutenant-Colonel) Kenneth Essex Edgeworth, MC, Royal Engineers.
- Captain and Brevet Major Henry Molesworth Edwards, Royal Engineers.
- Lieutenant-Colonel (temporary Brigadier-General) Robert James Goodall Elkington, CMG, Royal Artillery.
- Major (temporary Lieutenant-Colonel) William Elliott, Army Service Corps.
- Major Sherman Gordon Venn Ellis, West India Regiment.
- Captain Gordon Daubeny Gresley Elton, MC, Royal Irish Fusiliers.
- Captain (acting Lieutenant-Colonel) Philip Gordon Moss Elvery, MC, Royal Army Medical Corps.
- Major Ernest Robert Maling English, Shropshire Light Infantry.
- Lieutenant-Colonel Edward George Evans, Army Service Corps.
- Temporary Major (acting Lieutenant-Colonel) Frank Sulis Evans, Royal Field Artillery.
- Lieutenant-Colonel Moreland Stanhope Eyre, Royal Garrison Artillery.
- Major Charles Henry Fair, Rhodesia Police.
- Captain (temporary Major) Eric Fairclough, South Lancashire Regiment.
- Major Eric Felton Falkner, Army Service Corps.
- Captain (acting Major) Octavius Edward Fane, MC, Royal Garrison Artillery.
- Captain (acting Major) Cyril Farmer, MC, Royal Field Artillery.
- Major (temporary Lieutenant-Colonel) Percy Harrison Fawcett, retired pay, Reserve of Officers, late Royal Garrison Artillery.
- Lieutenant-Colonel Harold Ben Fawcus, CMG, MB, Royal Army Medical Corps.
- Captain (temporary Lieutenant-Colonel) Rowland Charles Feilding, Coldstream Guards.
- Captain (temporary Major) Louis Frederick Rudston Fell, Royal Flying Corps.
- Major George Cecil Verner Fenton, Royal Engineers.
- Major (temporary Lieutenant-Colonel) John Hampden Fessenden, Army Service Corps.
- Major (temporary Lieutenant-Colonel) Ronald D'Arcy Fife, CMG, retired pay, late Yorkshire Regiment.
- Lieutenant-Colonel (temporary Brigadier-General) Hamilton Walter Edward Finch, Middlesex Regiment.
- Lieutenant-Colonel Robert Fitzmaurice, Royal Field Artillery.
- Major Valentine Fleming, Yeomanry.
- Captain (acting Lieutenant-Colonel) Alexander Donald Fraser, MC, MB, Royal Army Medical Corps.
- Reverend Donald Fraser, Temporary Chaplain to the Forces, 3rd Class, Army Chaplains' Department.
- Major Henry Fraser, Royal Field Artillery.
- Captain William Pooley Bickerton Frazer, Royal Inniskilling Fusiliers.
- Captain Charles William Frizell, MC, Royal Berkshire Regiment.
- Major (temporary Lieutenant-Colonel) Herbert Albrecht Fulton, Worcestershire Regiment.
- Temporary Lieutenant Commander Harry Ernest Funnell, RNVR.
- Temporary Major James Hamilton Gailey, Unattached List, East African Protectorate Forces.
- Captain James Edward Evans Galbraith, Royal Fusiliers.
- Major James Anthony Gardner, Royal Garrison Artillery.
- Major William Brooksbank Garnett, Royal Welsh Fusiliers.
- Major George Ernest Gask, FRCS, LRCP, Royal Army Medical Corps.
- Temporary Captain (acting Major) John Angel Gibbs, Welsh Regiment.
- Captain (acting Lieutenant-Colonel) George James Giffard, Royal West Surrey Regiment.
- Temporary Captain Hector Gordon Gilchrist, MC, Royal Engineers (Lieutenant, Royal Engineers, Territorial Force).
- Lieutenant-Colonel (acting Colonel) James Geoffrey Gill, Royal Army Medical Corps.
- Temporary Major John Graham Gillam, Army Service Corps.
- Temporary Major Albert Gillibrand, Army Service Corps (Captain Army Service Corps, Territorial Force).
- Reverend Frederick Stanley Pears Lynn Girdlestone, MA, Temporary Chaplain to the Forces, 3rd Class, Army Chaplains' Department.
- Lieutenant-Colonel Gerald Hamilton Goddard, Royal Army Medical Corps.
- Temporary Major (acting Lieutenant-Colonel) Walter Godfrey, Welsh Regiment.
- Major Arthur Lowthian Godman, York Regiment and Royal Flying Corps.
- Captain John Golding, Royal Army Medical Corps.
- Major Harvey Goodwin, Middlesex Regiment.
- Major and Brevet Lieutenant-Colonel (temporary Lieutenant-Colonel) William Fanshawe Loudon Gordon, Norfolk Regiment.
- Captain and Brevet Major John Standish Surtees Prendergast Vereker, Viscount Gort, MVO, MC, Grenadier Guards.
- Major (temporary Lieutenant-Colonel) Seymour Frederick Gosling, Retired List, late Royal Artillery.
- Temporary Major (temporary Lieutenant-Colonel) Edward Lake Gowlland, MB, Royal Army Medical Corps (late Major, Royal Garrison Artillery Territorial Force).
- Major Lord Douglas Malise Graham, MC, Royal Artillery.
- Captain (temporary Major) Ogilvie Blair Graham, Rifle Brigade.
- Major Reginald Guy Graham, Yorkshire Regiment.
- Captain (temporary Major) George Rochford Grange, MC, Royal Engineers.
- Major (temporary Lieutenant-Colonel) Duncan Grant-Dalton, West Yorkshire Regiment.
- Temporary Lieutenant-Colonel Richard Stirling Grant Thorold, Welsh Regiment.
- Major Charles James Salkeld Green, MC, London Regiment.
- Major and Brevet Colonel (temporary Brigadier-General) Lewis Frederic Green-Wilkinson, retired pay, late Rifle Brigade.
- Captain (temporary Lieutenant-Colonel) John Greene, Dragoon Guards.
- Temporary Major William Alfred Greenley, Army Service Corps.
- Lieutenant-Colonel Frederick Augustus Greer, Royal Irish Fusiliers.
- Captain Charles Henry Greville, Grenadier Guards.
- Lieutenant (acting Major) William Alexander Grierson, North Lancashire Regiment.
- Major Peter Gerald Griffin, Royal Field Artillery, Special Reserve.
- Captain Reginald Francis Grimwood, London Regiment.
- Lieutenant-Colonel Daniel Charles Evans Grose, Army Service Corps.
- Major (temporary Lieutenant-Colonel) Robert Ferguson Grose, South Wales Borderers.
- Temporary Colonel Alan Roderick Haig-Brown, Unattached List (commanding Battalion, Middlesex Regiment).
- Major and Brevet Lieutenant-Colonel (temporary Lieutenant-Colonel) Douglas Keith Elphinstone Hall, Retired List, late Dorsetshire Regiment, Special Reserve.
- Captain (temporary Major) Harold Flintoff Hall, Royal Field Artillery.
- 2nd Lieutenant (temporary Major) Bernard Marsham Hallward, Rifle Brigade, Special Reserve.
- Major (temporary Lieutenant-Colonel) George Theodore Hamilton, Royal Artillery.
- Major (temporary Lieutenant-Colonel) George Herbert Leonard Hammerton, Royal Army Medical Corps.
- Captain Sydney James Hardy, Dragoons.
- Captain (temporary Major) Henry Alexander Augustus Francis Harman, South Staffordshire Regiment.
- Major Edward Temple Harris, MB, Indian Medical Service.
- Temporary Major Arthur Lionel Harrison, Machine Gun Corps.
- 2nd Lieutenant (acting Major) George Alfred Hart, Royal Field Artillery.
- Captain (acting Major) Alan Fleming Hartley, Indian Army.
- Major George Ernest Hawes, MC, Royal Fusiliers.
- Captain (temporary Lieutenant-Colonel) George Lennox Hay, Advanced Ordnance Depot.
- Captain (temporary Major) William Hayes, Royal West Surrey Regiment.
- Lieutenant (temporary Major) Charles Philip Heath, Royal Garrison Artillery.
- Captain Killingworth Michael Fentham Hedges, Army Service Corps.
- Major Edward Valentine Hemelryk, Royal Field Artillery.
- Major Arthur Pelham Heneage, Royal Field Artillery.
- Lieutenant-Colonel Ralph Henvey, Royal Artillery.
- Major (temporary Lieutenant-Colonel) Ernest William Hermon, retired pay, late Hussars.
- Captain (temporary Major) Roland Hermon Hermon-Hodge, MVO, late Grenadier Guards.
- Lieutenant-Colonel (acting Colonel) Henry Herrick, Royal Army Medical Corps.
- Captain Sir Frederick Edward William Hervey-Bathurst, Bt, retired pay, late Grenadier Guards.
- Temporary Major Rupert Paton Hewitt, Army Service Corps.
- Captain (temporary Major) Hector Miles Heyland, King's Royal Rifle Corps, Special Reserve.
- 2nd Lieutenant (temporary Captain) Marcus Beresford Heywood, MB, Yeomanry.
- Temporary Captain (temporary Major) Horace Cyril Benjamin Hickling, MC, Royal Engineers.
- Lieutenant-Colonel Thomas Albert Higginbotham, Royal Field Artillery.
- Major (temporary Lieutenant-Colonel) Harold Crossley Hildreth, FRCS, Royal Army Medical Corps.
- Major Clifford Hill. East African Mounted Rifles.
- Major (temporary Colonel) David John Jackson Hill, Army Ordnance Depot.
- Lieutenant-Colonel (temporary Brigadier-General) Edward Roden Hill, Highland Light Infantry.
- Lieutenant-Colonel Ralph Hindle, North Lancashire Regiment.
- Captain Charles Hervey Hoare, Yeomanry.
- Major (temporary Lieutenant-Colonel) Philip Egerton Hodgson, Royal Engineers.
- Captain (temporary Major) Edmond Adair Hodson, Rifle Brigade.
- Major Edward Thesiger Frankland Hood, Yeomanry (temporary Major, Royal Field Artillery).
- Major (acting Lieutenant-Colonel) Lewis Egerton Hopkins, Royal Engineers.
- Major Alfred Henry Hopwood, Lincolnshire Regiment.
- Major (temporary Lieutenant-Colonel) Robert Horn, MC, Seaforth Highlanders.
- Captain and Brevet Major (temporary Brigadier-General) William Thomas Francis Horwood, retired pay, late Lancers.
- Lieutenant-Colonel Cyril Henry Howkins, Royal Army Medical Corps.
- Captain and Brevet Major (acting Major) Noel Hudson, Royal Garrison Artillery.
- Temporary Major Herbert Francis Hughes, Army Service Corps.
- Captain (temporary Major) John Elgar Hume, Connaught Rangers.
- Temporary Captain (acting Major) John Hunter, Highland Light Infantry.
- Major (temporary Lieutenant-Colonel) William Gordon Huskisson, Army Service Corps.
- Major (temporary Lieutenant-Colonel) Samuel Hutchins, Army Service Corps.
- Major (acting Lieutenant-Colonel) Frederic Arthur Iles, Royal Engineers.
- Temporary Major Philip Denis Ionides, Middlesex Regiment.
- Temporary Lieutenant-Colonel Richard Abercrombie Irvine, CMG, commanding Battalion, Lancashire Fusiliers (honorary Major, unattached list, late Mil.)
- Captain Archibald Hardie Knowles Jackson, MC, Royal Warwickshire Regiment.
- Captain (acting Major) Arnold Nugent Strode Jackson, North Lancashire Regiment.
- Major and Brevet Lieutenant-Colonel (temporary Lieutenant-Colonel) Lambert Cameron Jackson, CMG, Royal Engineers.
- Temporary Major James Theodore Janson, Yorkshire Light Infantry.
- Temporary Major (acting Lieutenant-Colonel) Talbot McLeavy Jarvis, Royal West Surrey Regiment.
- Lieutenant Nilkanth Shriram Jatar, Indian Medical Service.
- Temporary Major Charles Douglas Jay, Machine Gun Corps.
- Lieutenant-Colonel Walton Jennings, Royal Garrison Artillery.
- Captain and Brevet Major (temporary Lieutenant-Colonel) Alexander Colin Johnston, MC, Worcestershire Regiment.
- Temporary Major Harrison Johnston, Cheshire Regiment.
- Temporary Captain (acting Major) Philip Henry Johnson, Machine Gun Corps.
- Temporary Captain Bernard Mount Jones, General List.
- Reverend David Miller Kay, Temporary Chaplain to the Forces, 3rd Class, Army Chaplains' Department.
- Lieutenant-Colonel (temporary Colonel) Herbert William Graham Keddie, Army Ordnance Depot.
- Captain George Theodore Elphinstone Keith, Royal Lancaster Regiment.
- Major and Brevet Lieutenant-Colonel (acting Lieutenant-Colonel) Courtenay Russell Kelly, Royal Garrison Artillery.
- Major (temporary Lieutenant-Colonel) William Davenport Crawley Kelly, Royal Army Medical Corps.
- Reverend Ivor T. Kempster, Temporary Chaplain to the Forces, 3rd Class, Army Chaplains' Department.
- Lieutenant (acting Lieutenant-Colonel) James Kennedy, Royal Highlanders.
- Major Norman Kennedy, Royal Scots Fusiliers.
- Captain Leonard William Kentish, Royal Fusiliers, Special Reserve.
- Captain and Brevet Major (temporary Lieutenant-Colonel) Edward Thomas John Kerans, Worcestershire Regiment.
- Lieutenant-Colonel Robert Geoffrey Keyworth, Royal Horse Artillery.
- Captain Douglas Kindersley, Highland Light Infantry, Special Reserve.
- Captain (temporary Lieutenant-Colonel) Andrew de Portal Kingsmill, MC, Reserve of Officers, late Grenadier Guards.
- Major Harold Kirby, Army Veterinary Corps.
- Captain William Lewis Clark Kirby, Lancers.
- Captain Hugh Cunningham Bruce Kirkpatrick, MC, King's Own Scottish Borderers.
- Temporary Major James Ramsay Notman Kirkwood, Royal Engineers.
- Captain (temporary Lieutenant-Colonel) Charles Henry Kitching, retired pay, Worcestershire Regiment, Special Reserves.
- Reverend Simon Stock Knapp, MC, Temporary Chaplain to the Forces, 3rd Class, Army Chaplains' Department.
- Major and Brevet Lieutenant-Colonel (temporary Lieutenant-Colonel) Henry Lewkeno Knight, Royal Irish Fusiliers.
- Temporary Major Frank Berners Knyvett, Royal Field Artillery.
- Temporary Major Carl Hans Kuhne, Army Service Corps.
- Major Henry Vernon Venables Kyrke, Royal Welsh Fusiliers.
- Major Kenneth Macgregor Laird, Argyll and Sutherland Highlanders.
- Temporary Major Isaac Wannop Lamonby, Royal Engineers.
- Quartermaster and Hon. Major Arthur Landen, Northumberland Fusiliers.
- Temporary Major Cecil Westmore Landon, Army Service Corps.
- Captain (temporary Major) Joseph Herbert Arthur Landon, Essex Regiment, and Royal Flying Corps.
- Major Edward Gilliat Langford, Royal Field Artillery.
- Captain (acting Major) Arthur Winton Langley, MC, Royal Garrison Artillery.
- Temporary Captain (acting Major) John Peter Larkin, King's Own Scottish Borderers.
- Honorary Major (temporary Honorary Lieutenant-Colonel) Arthur John Last, Army Ordnance Depot.
- Major (temporary Lieutenant-Colonel) Reginald Robert Lawrenson, West India Regiment.
- Major Thomas Coulson Leah, Royal Garrison Artillery.
- Captain (acting Major) Marcus Daly Lecky, Royal Garrison Artillery.
- Temporary Captain James Lee, General List.
- Major Hugh Percival Thomson Lefroy, MC, Royal Engineers.
- Captain (temporary Major) Claud Leney, Royal Garrison Artillery.
- Captain (acting Major) Graham Sydney Leventhorpe, Royal Field Artillery.
- Captain Harold Victor Lewis, MC, Indian Army.
- Major William Alfred Lewis, Monmouthshire Regiment.
- Captain (acting Lieutenant-Colonel) William Herbert Lewis, MC, Royal Garrison Artillery.
- Lieutenant-Colonel Arthur Robert Liddell, Army Service Corps.
- Captain Hyman Lightstone, MC, Royal Army Medical Corps.
- Temporary Major Charles Lionel Lindeman, General List.
- Major George Mackintosh Lindsay, Rifle Brigade.
- Captain (acting Major) William Benjamin Little, MC, East Lancashire Regiment.
- Captain (acting Lieutenant-Colonel) Archibald Smith Littlejohns, Royal Army Medical Corps.
- Captain Glyn Lloyd, Army Veterinary Corps, Special Reserve.
- Major and Brevet Lieutenant-Colonel (temporary Brigadier-General) John Henry Lloyd, Royal Lancaster Regiment, Special Reserve, retired pay.
- Temporary Captain (temporary Major) Beresford Clayton Lockhart-Jervis, Royal Engineers.
- Temporary Lieutenant-Colonel David Dale Logan, MD, Royal Army Medical Corps.
- Temporary Captain (acting Major) Godfrey Lomer, Royal Field Artillery.
- Captain (temporary Lieutenant-Colonel) Robert Loraine, MC, Royal Flying Corps, Special Reserves.
- Lieutenant-Colonel Frank Baigrie Lord, Army Service Corps.
- Major Brian John Michael Luck, Royal Garrison Artillery.
- Major (acting Lieutenant-Colonel) Alfred Forbes Lumsden, Royal Scots.
- Captain (acting Major) Otto Marling Lund, Royal Field Artillery.
- Lieutenant (acting Major) Robert Charles Lundie, Royal Engineers, Special Reserve.
- Temporary Captain (temporary Colonel) David Lyell, Royal Engineers.
- Major Cyril Arthur Lyon, Royal Garrison Artillery.
- Major James Joseph McCarthy, MC, Rhodesia Police.
- Major (temporary Lieutenant-Colonel) Stanley Robert McClintock, Gordon Highlanders.
- Captain (acting Major) Douglas Fitzgerald McConnel, Royal Field Artillery.
- Captain and Hon. Major (temporary Major) William McGildowny, Retired List, late Royal Garrison Artillery, Special Reserves.
- Captain (acting Lieutenant-Colonel) John Bickerton McKaig, Liverpool Regiment.
- Captain Douglas William Alexander Dalziel MacKenzie, Seaforth Highlanders.
- Lieutenant-Colonel (temporary Colonel) Peter MacKessack, MB, Royal Army Medical Corps.
- Captain (acting Lieutenant-Colonel) George Mackie, Royal Army Medical Corps.
- Honorary Captain James Campbell Mackie, Army Service Corps.
- Temporary Major Norman MacLeod, Cameron Highlanders.
- Major John Arthur McQueen, MC, Royal Engineers.
- Captain (temporary Major) Norman McQueen, Argyll and Sutherland Highlanders, Special Reserve.
- Lieutenant-Colonel William Robarts Napier Madocks, CMG, Royal Field Artillery.
- Captain (acting Lieutenant-Colonel) Robert Magill, MB, Royal Army Medical Corps, Special Reserve.
- Captain (acting Major) Meyrick Myler Magrath, Royal Field Artillery.
- Captain Brian McMahon Mahon, MC, London Regiment.
- Major Roger Ferdinand Mainguy, Royal Engineers.
- Major Reginald Charles Frederick Maitland, Royal Horse Artillery.
- Captain (temporary Lieutenant-Colonel) Harry Charles Malet, Hussars, Special Reserve (Captain, retired pay).
- Temporary Lieutenant (acting Major) Robert Charles Manning, MC, Royal Engineers.
- Temporary Captain John Richardson Marrack, MC, MB, Royal Army Medical Corps.
- Lieutenant-Colonel Edwin Walter Purdy Vere Marriott, Royal Army Medical Corps.
- Lieutenant (temporary Captain) John Charles Oakes Marriott, MC, Northamptonshire Regiment.
- Lieutenant-Colonel Hopton Eliott Marsh, Royal Garrison Artillery.
- Lieutenant (temporary Major) Edward Hillis Marshall, Royal Field Artillery.
- Major (acting Lieutenant-Colonel) Cuthbert Thomas Martin, Highland Light Infantry.
- Temporary (acting Major) Captain Hugh Martin, Royal Field Artillery.
- Major Maurice Edward Mascall, Royal Garrison Artillery.
- Major Hugh Royds Stokes Massy, MC, Royal Field Artillery.
- Major George Master, Royal Engineers.
- Temporary Captain Archibald Matheson, Royal Engineers, Special Reserve.
- Major (acting Lieutenant-Colonel) Thomas Gilbert Mathias, Welsh Regiment.
- Major (temporary Lieutenant-Colonel) John Matthews, Royal Army Medical Corps.
- Major Guy Warren Meade, MC, Royal Field Artillery.
- Captain (temporary Major) Reginald William Mellard, Army Veterinary Corps.
- Major (temporary Lieutenant-Colonel) John Menzies, Highland Light Infantry.
- Temporary Lieutenant-Colonel Arthur Albert Messer, Graves Registration Section.
- Major William Henry Middleton, Hampshire Regiment.
- Captain Eric Grant Miles, MC, King's Own Scottish Borderers.
- Temporary Major Charles Frederick Miller, Duke of Cornwall's Light Infantry.
- Temporary Major (temporary Lieutenant-Colonel) George Pilkington Mills, Bedfordshire Regiment.
- Major Clement Arthur Milward, Indian Army.
- Major and Brevet Lieutenant-Colonel (temporary Lieutenant-Colonel) Alan James Gordon Moir, Royal Scots.
- Major Leonard Greenham Star Molloy, Yeomanry.
- Major (temporary Lieutenant-Colonel) Walter William Molony, Army Service Corps.
- Lieutenant-Colonel Roger Henry Monck-Mason, Royal Munster Fusiliers.
- Major The Hon. George Vere Arundell Monckton-Arundell, Life Guards.
- Reverend Charles Wilfred Gwennap Moore, MA, Temporary Chaplain, Royal Navy.
- Major Herbert Durie-Moore, Indian Army.
- Major (acting Lieutenant-Colonel) Osbert Cautley Mordaunt, Somerset Light Infantry.
- Captain (temporary Major) Percy Clifford Reynolds Moreton, Royal Monmouthshire Royal Engineers, Special Reserve.
- Major Francis Alan Stewart Morgan, Royal Garrison Artillery.
- Lieutenant-Colonel John William Moore Morgan, Army Service Corps.
- 2nd Lieutenant (acting Major) William Henry Morgan, Royal Engineers, Special Reserve.
- Temporary Lieutenant (temporary Captain) Oisin Eveleigh Moriarty, Royal Field Artillery (late Lieutenant, Royal Garrison Artillery, Special

Reserve)

- Captain (temporary Major) Alfred Morris, Royal Fusiliers.
- Captain (acting Lieutenant-Colonel) Charles Reade Monroe Morris, MB, Royal Army Medical Corps.
- Captain (temporary Major) Joseph Morris, Machine Gun Corps.
- Captain (temporary Major) John Arthur Muirhead, Indian Army.
- Captain (acting Lieutenant-Colonel) Kenneth Duncan Murchison, MB, Royal Army Medical Corps, Special Reserves.
- Lieutenant-Colonel John Alexander Shakespear Murray, Army Ordnance Corps.
- Major William Athol Murray, Royal Horse Artillery.
- Captain (temporary Lieutenant-Colonel) Richard Stephen Murray-White, Yeomanry.
- Captain (acting Major) John Oliver Naismith, Royal Field Artillery, Special Reserve.
- Captain (acting Major) Noel Warren Napier-Clavering, Royal Engineers.
- Major and Brevet Lieutenant-Colonel (temporary Colonel) John James Henry Nation, Royal Engineers.
- Captain (acting Major) Frederick Austin Neill, Royal Engineers.
- Major John Beaumont Neilson, Highland Light Infantry.
- Temporary Captain Charles Joseph Newbold, Royal Engineers.
- Lieutenant (temporary Major) Henry Leigh Newton, Royal Field Artillery.
- Temporary Captain (acting Major) George Gordon Nicol, Royal Engineers.
- Major (temporary Lieutenant-Colonel) Compton Cardew Norman, Royal Welsh Fusiliers.
- Major Henry Marshal Nornabell, Royal Field Artillery.
- Temporary Lieutenant (temporary Major) Cyril Burton North, MC, Royal Engineers.
- Captain (acting Lieutenant-Colonel) Arthur Drought O'Carroll, MB, Royal Army Medical Corps.
- Major (temporary Lieutenant-Colonel) Edmund Chaloner Ogle, West India Regiment.
- Lieutenant-Colonel (temporary Lieutenant-Colonel) Standish de Courcy O'Grady, MB, Royal Army Medical Corps.
- Major Frederick Hugh Langton Oldham, Royal Artillery.
- Lieutenant-Colonel (temporary Brigadier-General) Cranley Charlton Onslow, CMG, Bedfordshire Regiment.
- Major Charles Alexander Organ, Army Service Corps.
- Temporary Captain (acting Major) Ernest William Ormston, Royal Engineers.
- Major John Palgrave Heathcote Ouchterlony, Royal Engineers.
- Major Douglas Charles Owen, Middlesex Regiment.
- Lieutenant (acting Major) Gordon Whistler Arnaud Painter, Royal Garrison Artillery.
- Major (temporary Colonel) William Alfred Pallin, FRCVS, Army Veterinary Corps.
- Major Albert John Palmer, Yeomanry.
- Captain Alexander Edward Guy Palmer, MC, Yorkshire Regiment.
- Lieutenant-Colonel (temporary Brigadier-General) Alphonse Eugene Panet, CMG, Royal Engineers.
- Major Keith Parbury, Royal Field Artillery.
- Major William Forster Parsons, Royal Field Artillery.
- Major (acting Lieutenant-Colonel) William Frederick Parsons, Retired List, late Royal Field Artillery.
- Major James Sydney Pascoe, Royal Army Medical Corps.
- Major and Honorary Lieutenant-Colonel George Frederick Paske, Oxfordshire and Buckinghamshire Light Infantry, Special Reserve.
- Temporary Major (local Lieutenant-Colonel) John Hicks Paull, General List.
- Temporary Major Frank Gervas Payne, Machine Gun Corps.
- Major and Brevet Lieutenant-Colonel (temporary Lieutenant-Colonel) Charles William Pearless, South Wales Borderers.
- Captain (temporary Major) Harold Leslie Pearson, Royal Field Artillery.
- Captain (temporary Major) Herbert Walter Peebles, Retired List, late Army Service Corps.
- Lieutenant-Colonel The Hon. Sidney Cornwallis Peel, Yeomanry.
- Temporary Major William Ralph Peel, Yorkshire Regiment.
- Captain (acting Major) Christopher Peter Westby Perceval, Royal Field Artillery.
- Captain (temporary Major) Lord William Richard Percy, Grenadier Guards.
- Major Frank Roff Phillips, Royal Artillery.
- Captain (acting Lieutenant-Colonel) Noel Clive Phillips, MC, North Lancashire Regiment, Special Reserve.
- Captain (temporary Major) John Leslie Portal, Oxfordshire and Buckinghamshire Light Infantry.
- Captain (acting Major) William Guthrie Porter, Royal Field Artillery.
- Captain (temporary Major) Edward Helme Pott, Indian Army.
- Major (temporary Lieutenant-Colonel) John Edward Powell, Royal Army Medical Corps.
- Lieutenant-Colonel (temporary Brigadier-General) Cyril Prescott-Decie, Royal Artillery.
- Major The Hon. Richard Martin Peter Preston, Honourable Artillery Company.
- Temporary Major (acting Lieutenant-Colonel) Robert Preston Preston-Whyte, Somerset Light Infantry.
- Major Owen Lloyd Price, Royal Garrison Artillery.
- Captain Joseph Hubert Priestley, Unattached List.
- Lieutenant-Colonel Bernard Henry Leathes Prior, Norfolk Regiment.
- Temporary Captain (acting Major) Caryl ap Rhys Pryce, Royal Field Artillery.
- Major and Brevet Lieutenant-Colonel (temporary Lieutenant-Colonel) Henry Edward ap Rhys Pryce, CMG, Indian Army.
- Major (temporary Lieutenant-Colonel) Henry Morris Pryce-Jones, MC, Coldstream Guards.
- Captain Alfred Amos Pryer, Army Veterinary Corps.
- Major (temporary Lieutenant-Colonel) Thomas Phare Puddicombe, MB, Royal Army Medical Corps.
- Lieutenant-Colonel David Charles Pugh, Royal Artillery.
- Temporary Captain Arnold Pumphrey, Durham Light Infantry.
- Reverend Thomas Wentworth Pym, Temporary Chaplain to the Forces, 3rd Class, Army Chaplains' Department.
- Temporary Captain Geoffrey Lee Pyman, Yorkshire Light Infantry.
- Captain (acting Major) Frederick Sparke Pyne, Royal Field Artillery.
- Temporary Major Gordon Openshaw Ramsbottom, Manchester Regiment.
- Major Harold Eugene Ford Rathbone, Royal Engineers.
- Lieutenant-Colonel (temporary Colonel) Malcolm MacGregor Rattray, MB, Royal Army Medical Corps.
- Temporary Major Tom Reay, Northumberland Fusiliers.
- Temporary Major Alexander Daniel Reid (Lieutenant, retd, Indian Army), attached Royal Inniskilling Fusiliers.
- Lieutenant-Colonel and Brevet Colonel Francis Maude Reid, Retired Pay, late Highland Light Infantry (commanding battalion, Royal Fusiliers).
- Major and Brevet Lieutenant-Colonel (temporary Lieutenant-Colonel) Hector Gowans Reid, Army Service Corps.
- Lieutenant-Colonel James Philip Reynolds, Royal Field Artillery.
- Major Wilfrid Francis Ricardo, Yeomanry.
- Major (temporary Lieutenant-Colonel) Cecil Edward Rice, Yeomanry (commanding Battalion, Royal Fusiliers).
- Captain (acting Major) Francis Howe Richards, Royal Field Artillery.
- Major John Duncan Richmond, MB, Royal Army Medical Corps.
- Captain (temporary Major) John George Edmund Rideal, York and Lancaster Regiment.
- Temporary Captain Henry Constable Roberts, Intelligence Corps.
- Captain (acting Lieutenant-Colonel) Francis Robinson, Royal Inniskilling Fusiliers.
- Temporary Captain (acting Major) Hugh Thomas Kay Robinson, Royal Sussex Regiment.
- Major John Poole Bowring Robinson, Royal Dublin Fusiliers.
- Major (temporary Lieutenant-Colonel) Henry Rogers, MB, Royal Army Medical Corps.
- Captain (acting Major) Wilfrid Frank Rogers, Royal Field Artillery.
- Major (temporary Lieutenant-Colonel) David Rorie, MD, Royal Army Medical Corps.
- Captain Gawaine Basil Rowan-Hamilton, MC, Royal Highlanders.
- Lieutenant-Colonel Henry William Rushton. Royal Engineers.
- Lieutenant (acting Major) Ambrose William Ryan, Royal Garrison Artillery.
- Temporary Major Albert Sadler, Army Service Corps.
- Major Henry Knight Sadler, MC, Royal Field Artillery.
- Major Harold Richard Sandilands, Northumberland Fusiliers.
- Major (temporary Lieutenant-Colonel) James Sargent, Lancashire Fusiliers.
- Lieutenant Geoffry Allen Percival Scoones, MC, Indian Army.
- Lieutenant-Colonel Edward McMahon Seddon, Royal Garrison Artillery.
- Major Charles Westrope Selby, MC, Royal Field Artillery.
- Temporary Captain (acting Lieutenant-Colonel) Lawrence Drew Shaw, Royal Army Medical Corps.
- Major George Faber Sheehan, Royal Army Medical Corps.
- Lieutenant (temporary Captain) Clifford Dommet Sheldon, Royal Engineers, Special Reserve.
- Captain and Brevet Major (temporary Brigadier-General) Gordon Strachey Shephard, MC, Royal Fusiliers (attached Royal Flying Corps).
- Captain Gilbert John Victor Shepherd, Royal Engineers.
- Major William Kidd Ogilvie Shepherd, Royal Field Artillery.
- Temporary Major Eustace Graham Sheppard, MVO, Royal Engineers (Captain, Royal Engineers, Territorial Force).
- Major (temporary Lieutenant-Colonel) Robert Osborne Sheppard, Advanced Ordnance Depot.
- Major (acting Lieutenant-Colonel) Nevile Hugh Cairns Sherbrooke, Royal Horse Artillery.
- Major David John Christopher Eustace Sherlock, Royal Field Artillery.
- Temporary Major Edwin Collingwood Sherman, Army Service Corps.
- Major and Brevet Lieutenant-Colonel (temporary Lieutenant-Colonel) Oliver Caton Sherwood, retired pay, late Advanced Ordnance Depot.
- Major (temporary Lieutenant-Colonel) Ion Richard Staveley Shinkwin, Army Service Corps.
- Major Henry Sidney, Yeomanry.
- Lieutenant-Colonel and Brevet Colonel Charles Napier Simpson, retired pay, Royal Field Artillery.
- Temporary Major Lightly Stapleton Simpson, Royal Engineers.
- Major (temporary Lieutenant-Colonel) Randal Charles Edward Skeffington-Smyth, retired pay, late Coldstream Guards.
- Temporary Major Arthur George Walker Skirrow, General List.
- Temporary Captain (acting Major) Allen Thomson Sloan, Royal Field Artillery.
- Reverend Charles William Smith, Chaplain to the Forces, 1st Class, Army Chaplains' Department.
- Captain (temporary Major) Douglas Kirke Smith, Royal Field Artillery.
- Temporary Lieutenant-Colonel Frederick William Smith, commanding Battalion, Welsh Regiment. (Honorary Lieutenant, Yeomanry).
- Major Herbert Charles Hyde Smith, Scottish Rifles.
- Major Samuel Boylan Smith, MD, Royal Army Medical Corps.
- Lieutenant (acting Lieutenant-Colonel) Tristram Oswald Smith, North Lancashire Regiment.
- Lieutenant-Colonel William MacKenzie Smith, Yeomanry.
- Captain (temporary Major) Humphrey Etwall Smyth, Royal Artillery.
- Major Robert Riversdale Smyth, Leinster Regiment.
- Temporary Captain (acting Major) William Johnston Somerville, Royal Engineers.
- Temporary Major (acting Lieutenant-Colonel) Wyndham Lucas Sorel, Army Service Corps.
- Lieutenant-Colonel Lionel Arthur Clement Southam, Royal Field Artillery.
- Captain (acting Major) Richard Augustus Spencer, Royal Field Artillery.
- Temporary Major John Charles Spencer-Phillips, Army Service Corps (Captain, Army Service Corps, Territorial Force).
- Major Gerald Montagu Spencer-Smith, Royal Field Artillery.
- Temporary Major George Herbert Spittle, Royal Engineers (late Royal Marines).
- Captain (temporary Major) Andrew Spruell, Army Veterinary Corps.
- Major James Richard, Earl Stanhope, MC, Royal West Surrey Regiment (late Captain, Grenadier Guards.).
- Major (acting Lieutenant-Colonel) Frederick Stanley, Royal Field Artillery.
- Captain (acting Major) Derek Charles Stephenson, MC, Royal Field Artillery.
- Temporary Lieutenant-Colonel Robert Stephenson, South Staffordshire Regiment (formerly Northumberland Fusiliers).
- Captain (acting Lieutenant-Colonel) Gerald Hoey Stevenson, MB, Royal Army Medical Corps.
- Major (temporary Lieutenant-Colonel) Hugh Stewart, MC, MB, Royal Army Medical Corps.
- Captain (temporary Lieutenant-Colonel) William Norman Stewart, Yeomanry.
- Temporary Major Ralph Shelton Griffin Stokes, MC, Royal Engineers.
- Temporary Captain Granville Edward Stewart Streatfeild, Royal Engineers.
- Captain (temporary Major) Henry Sidney John Streatfeild, London Regiment (late Lieutenant, Grenadier Guards.).
- Lieutenant-Colonel (temporary Colonel) Oscar Striedinger, Army Service Corps.
- Lieutenant-Colonel Clement Arthur Sykes, Royal Field Artillery.
- Temporary Captain (temporary Major) Gilbert Andrew Syme, MC, Royal Engineers.
- Temporary Lieutenant-Colonel Guy Symonds, Royal Field Artillery.
- Major Wilfrid Thomas Synnott, retired pay, late Royal Garrison Artillery, attached Royal Field Artillery.
- Captain (temporary Major) James Tait, Royal Scots.
- Major (temporary Lieutenant-Colonel) George James Francis Talbot, retired pay, late Royal Field Artillery.
- Captain (temporary Major) Hugh Tallents, Yeomanry.
- Major and Brevet Lieutenant-Colonel (temporary Lieutenant-Colonel) Ernest Napper Tandy, Royal Artillery.
- Reverend Thomas Newell Tattersall, Temporary Chaplain to the Forces, 2nd Class, Army Chaplains' Department.
- Temporary Major Henry Pascoe Blair Tayler, General List (late Army Service Corps).
- Captain (acting Lieutenant-Colonel) Murray Ross Taylor, MD, Royal Army Medical Corps, Special Reserve.
- Captain (temporary Major) Richard Stopford Taylor, MB, FRCS, Royal Army Medical Corps.
- Major (temporary Lieutenant-Colonel) Charles Russell Terrot, Dragoons.
- Major Frank Eric Tetley, Lincolnshire Regiment.
- Major (temporary Lieutenant-Colonel) Horace Audley Thewles, East Kent Regiment.
- Captain (acting Major) Francis William Thicknesse, Royal Garrison Artillery.
- Captain Arnold Newall Thomas, MB, Indian Medical Service.
- Quartermaster and Honorary Major Gwynne Cecil Thomas, South Wales Borderers.
- Lieutenant-Colonel Hubert St. George Thomas, Indian Army.
- Major Aubrey Julian Thompson, Royal Garrison Artillery.
- Lieutenant-Colonel William George Thompson, Royal Field Artillery.
- Lieutenant-Colonel Alexander Henry Gouger Thomson, Indian Army.
- Lieutenant-Colonel Robert Henry Tilney, Yeomanry.
- Reverend Francis Charles Timins, Temporary Chaplain to the Forces, 3rd Class, Army Chaplains' Department.
- Major (temporary Lieutenant-Colonel) Henry Archdale Tomkinson, Dragoons.
- Major Derrick le Poer Trench, MC, Royal Artillery.
- Major (temporary Lieutenant-Colonel) Edward Fynmore Trew, Royal Marines.
- Captain (temporary Major) William Henry Lainson Tripp, Royal Marine Artillery.
- Reverend Lenthall Greville Trotman-Dickenson, Army Chaplains' Department.
- Temporary Captain (temporary Major) Ewan Tulloch, MC, Royal Engineers.
- Temporary Captain (temporary Major) David Oliver Turnbull, Army Veterinary Corps.
- Major John Archbold Turnbull, Royal Army Medical Corps.
- Lieutenant-Colonel Arthur Malcolm Tyler, Royal Garrison Artillery.
- Major Roper Maxwell Tyler, Durham Light Infantry.
- Captain (temporary Major) William Grant Tyrrell, Royal Engineers.
- Captain (temporary Major) James Valentine, Royal Flying Corps, Special Reserve.
- Major Alexander William Van Straubenzee, Royal Field Artillery.
- Lieutenant-Colonel Edward Vaughan, Manchester Regiment.
- Major and Brevet Lieutenant-Colonel (temporary Lieutenant-Colonel) Ivo Lucius Beresford Vesey, Royal West Surrey Regiment.
- Temporary Major William Henry Vickress, Army Service Corps.
- Lieutenant-Colonel Charles Ernest Walker, Royal Field Artillery.
- Temporary Captain Robert Bruce Wallace, MB, Royal Army Medical Corps.
- Lieutenant-Colonel Arthur Ward, Indian Army.
- Captain (temporary Lieutenant-Colonel) William St. Andrew Warde-Aldam, Coldstream Guards.
- Lieutenant-Colonel Anthony Henry Waring, Royal Army Medical Corps.
- Captain Edward Courtenay Thomas Warner, MC, Scots Guards.
- Major Philip Seymour Watkins, Royal Engineers.
- Major Charles Henry Watson, Indian Medical Service.
- Captain (acting Major) George Edmund Borlase Watson, MC, Royal Field Artillery.
- Captain Gerald Oscar Way, North Staffordshire Regiment, Special Reserve.
- Major (acting Lieutenant-Colonel) William Ince Webb-Bowen, Middlesex Regiment.
- Captain (acting Lieutenant-Colonel) Alan Geoffry Wells, Royal Army Medical Corps.
- Major (temporary Lieutenant-Colonel) Richard Melbourne West, MD, Royal Army Medical Corps.
- Major Walter John Weston, Royal Army Medical Corps.
- Major (temporary Lieutenant-Colonel) Stuart Lumley Whatford, Yorkshire Regiment.
- Lieutenant-Colonel (temporary Brigadier-General) Philip Wheatley, Royal Artillery.
- Captain Maurice FitzGibbon Grove White, Royal Engineers.
- Major and Brevet Lieutenant-Colonel (temporary Lieutenant-Colonel) James Ross White, Royal Engineers.
- Temporary Major (acting Lieutenant-Colonel) John James Whitehead, Manchester Regiment.
- Temporary Captain (acting Major) Percival Frederick Whittall, Royal Engineers (Captain, Reserve of Officers, late Lincolnshire Regiment).
- Lieutenant (temporary Lieutenant-Colonel) Charles Herbert Whittingham, retired pay, late Durham Light Infantry.
- Captain (temporary Major) Noel Irwine Whitty, Royal West Kent Regiment.
- Temporary Major William Humphrey Meyrick Wienholt, North Lancashire Regiment.
- Major Leonard Clay Wilde, Manchester Regiment.
- Major (temporary Lieutenant-Colonel) Henry John Williams, Dragoon Guards.
- Temporary Captain (acting Major) Stanley Horatio Williams, Royal Field Artillery.
- Major (acting Lieutenant-Colonel) Sherlock George Ramsay Willis, Royal Field Artillery.
- Temporary Major Sir John Christopher Willoughby, Bt, Army Service Corps (late Major, Royal Horse Guards).
- Major D'Arcy Willoughby-Osborne, Royal Field Artillery.
- Captain (temporary Major) Edward Neynoe Willyams, Duke of Cornwall's Light Infantry.
- Quartermaster and Honorary Major George Wilson, Royal Lancaster Regiment.
- Captain (temporary Lieutenant-Colonel) Percival Kinnear Wise, Royal Warwickshire Regiment and Royal Flying Corps.
- Major and Brevet Lieutenant-Colonel Charles Michell Aloysius Wood, Northumberland Fusiliers.
- Lieutenant-Colonel Ernest Wood, Army Service Corps.
- Temporary Major (acting Lieutenant-Colonel) Hugh Reginald Wood, Welsh Regiment.
- Lieutenant (acting Major) Louis Wood, Royal Field Artillery.
- Captain and Brevet Major (temporary Lieutenant-Colonel) Frank Pickford Worsley, retired pay, late West Yorkshire Regiment.
- Temporary Lieutenant-Colonel Herbert Edward Wootten, Border Regiment.
- Lieutenant-Colonel Edwin Arnold Wraith, Royal Army Medical Corps.
- Major Henry Cecil Wray, Royal Field Artillery.
- Captain (acting Lieutenant-Colonel) Harold Lee Wright, Royal Engineers.
- Captain (acting Lieutenant-Colonel) Nicholas Irwin Wright, Northumberland Fusiliers.
- Major (acting Lieutenant-Colonel) Thomas James Wright, Royal Army Medical Corps.
- Major (temporary Lieutenant-Colonel) Philip George, Lord Wynford, Royal Field Artillery.
- Lieutenant-Colonel (temporary Colonel) Julian Mayne Young, CMG, Army Service Corps.
- Reverend Stanislaus Dominic Young, Temporary Chaplain to the Forces, 3rd Class, Army Chaplains' Department.
- Temporary Captain Harry Hogg Yuill, MC, Royal Engineers.

Australian Forces

- Major William Affleck Adams, Pioneer Battalion.
- Lieutenant-Colonel William Gillian Allsop, Artillery.
- Major Thomas Faulkiner Borwick. Australian Imperial Forces.
- Major (temporary Lieutenant-Colonel) Charles Philip Butler, Australian Imperial Forces.
- Lieutenant-Colonel Harry Nairn Butler, Australian Army Medical Corps.
- Major George Gumming Byrne, Australian Army Medical Corps.
- Lieutenant-Colonel Hector Osman Caddy, Artillery.
- Major George Edwards Cole, Australian Army Medical Corps.
- Lieutenant-Colonel Charles Herbert Davis, Australian Imperial Forces.
- Lieutenant-Colonel (temporary Colonel) Constantine Trent Champion de Crespigny, Australian Army Medical Corps.
- Lieutenant-Colonel Howard Kynaston Denham, Australian Imperial Force.
- Major George Frederick Dickinson, Australian Imperial Force.
- Captain (temporary Major) Oliver Francis Dixon, Artillery.
- Major John Francis Donnelly, Infantry.
- Major John Milton Edgley, Australian Imperial Force.
- Captain (temporary Major) Rupert Edward Fanning, Artillery.
- Major John Edward Fraser, Engineers.
- Major William Angus Fraser, Australian Army Medical Corps.
- Major Felix Gordon Giles, Australian Imperial Force.
- Major Charles James Goddard, commanding Supply Company.
- Major Harold Greenway, Engineers.
- Lieutenant-Colonel (temporary Colonel) William Weston Hearne, Australian Army Medical Corps.
- Major (temporary Lieutenant-Colonel) Rupert Reginald Hockley, Australian Imperial Force.
- Lieutenant-Colonel (temporary Colonel) Robert Beveridge Huxtable, Australian Army Medical Corps.
- Major Alexander Peter Imlay, Australian Imperial Force.
- Major Charles Melbourne Johnston, Australian Imperial Force.
- Captain James Carstairs Kininmonth, Ordnance Corps.
- Colonel John Edward Cecil Lord, Australian Imperial Force.
- Major Noel Medway Loutit, Australian Imperial Force.
- Major Cyril Leslie Stewart Macintosh, Australian Army Medical Corps.
- Lieutenant-Colonel Thomas Matson, Army Veterinary Corps.
- Quartermaster and Honorary Major (temporary Major) George Maxted, General List, Australian Imperial Forces.
- Lieutenant-Colonel Leslie Cecil Maygar, VC, Light Horse Regiment.
- Captain (temporary Major) Ross Cairns McCay, Field Battery.
- Lieutenant-Colonel Terence Patrick McSharry, MC, Australian Imperial Force.
- Major Roy Morrell, Machine Gun Corps.
- Major Richard Victor Morse, Mining Section.
- Lieutenant-Colonel Leslie James Morshead, Australian Imperial Forces.
- Lieutenant-Colonel Leslie Miltiades Mullen, Australian Imperial Force.
- Major Edward Joy Munro, Army Service Corps.
- Lieutenant-Colonel George Francis Murphy, Australian Imperial Force.
- Major John William Parsons, Light Horse Regiment.
- Captain (temporary Major) John Keating Paul, Australian Artillery.
- Lieutenant-Colonel John Henry Peck, Australian Imperial Force.
- Captain (temporary Major) Thomas Alfred Jack Playfair, Australian Artillery.
- Captain Arthur Hunter Powell, Australian Army Medical Corps.
- Major Rupert Anstice Rafferty, Australian Imperial Force.
- Captain Horace Clement Hugh Robertson, Light Horse Regiment.
- Colonel (temporary Brigadier-General) James Campbell Robertson, CMG, commanding Australian Infantry Brigade.
- Lieutenant-Colonel Alfred George Salisbury, Australian Imperial Forces.
- Lieutenant-Colonel Bertie Vandeleur Stacy, Australian Imperial Forces.
- Lieutenant-Colonel Arthur Hamilton Tebbutt, Australian Army Medical Corps.
- Lieutenant-Colonel William Charles Nightingale Waite, MC, Australian Artillery.
- Major Roy William Whiston Walsh, Australian Army Medical Corps.
- Lieutenant-Colonel John Walstab, Australian Imperial Force.
- Major Herbert Locksley St. Vincent Welch, Australian Army Medical Corps.
- Major George Frederick Gardells Wieck, Light Horse Regiment.
- Major Thomas Isaac Cornwall Williams, Australian Artillery.
- Major Thomas Rhys Williams, Australian Engineers.
- Quartermaster and Honorary Major William James Willis, Infantry Battalion.
- Major George Frederick Wootten.

Canadian Forces

- Lieutenant-Colonel Samuel Boyd Anderson, Canadian Field Artillery.
- Major Edmund Graves Meredith Cape, Canadian Artillery.
- Lieutenant-Colonel John Arthur Clark, Canadian Infantry.
- Major Henry Duncan Graham Crerar, Canadian Field Artillery.
- Major James Albert Cross, Infantry.
- Lieutenant-Colonel Herbert John Dawson, Infantry.
- Major (acting Lieutenant-Colonel) William Barnard Evans, Infantry.
- Captain (acting Major) William Joseph Forbes-Mitchell, Infantry.
- Major Frederick Gilman, Dragoons.
- Major Raymond Meyers Gorssline, Canadian Army Medical Corps.
- Lieutenant-Colonel William Grassie, Infantry.
- Lieutenant-Colonel William Belfry Hendry, Canadian Army Medical Corps.
- Lieutenant-Colonel George Cuthbert Hodson.
- Infantry Lieutenant-Colonel Donald Hogarth, Canadian Army Service Corps.
- Lieutenant-Colonel William Josiah Hartley Holmes, Pioneer Battalion.
- Major John Stephen Jenkins, Canadian Army Medical Corps.
- Major Leo Richer Lafleche, Infantry.
- Major William Smith Latta, Infantry.
- Major (temporary Lieutenant-Colonel) Alfred Tully le Fevre, Railway Construction Corps.
- Major Charles Bethune Lindsey, Infantry.
- Captain (acting Major) Hilliard Lyle, Infantry.
- Major Robert Alexander MacFarlane, Infantry.
- Major Daniel Albert MacKinnon, Infantry.
- Lieutenant-Colonel Albert Edward Massie, Canadian Army Service Corps.
- Major (acting Lieutenant-Colonel) Gault McCombe, Infantry.
- Major George Whitlock McFarlane, Infantry.
- Lieutenant-Colonel Chester Fish McGuffen, Canadian Army Medical Corps.
- Lieutenant-Colonel John Douglas McQueen, Canadian Army Medical Corps.
- Captain (temporary Major) Kenric Rud Marshall, Infantry.
- Lieutenant-Colonel (temporary Brigadier-General) James Henry Mitchell, Canadian Field Artillery.
- Major James Vincent Patrick O'Donahoe, Infantry.
- Lieutenant-Colonel Daniel Mawat Ormond, Infantry.
- Major (temporary Lieutenant-Colonel) Stratton Harry Osier, Royal Canadian Engineers.
- Lieutenant-Colonel Cyrus Wesley Peck, Infantry.
- Captain (acting Major) Cecil George Porter, Infantry.
- Major Albert Genelle Poupore, Infantry.
- Major Waldron Brewer Prowse, Artillery.
- Lieutenant-Colonel George Harrah Ralston, Field Artillery.
- Captain (acting Major) James Ross, Infantry.
- Lieutenant-Colonel Herbert C. Sparling, Infantry.
- Major Francis Macdonald Steel, Infantry.
- Major Arthur Christopher Sutton, Pioneer Battalion.
- Lieutenant-Colonel Charles Perry Templeton, Canadian Army Medical Corps.
- Major Clifford Thackwell Trotter, Canadian Engineers.
- Captain (acting Major) John William Henry Gerit Hopman Van Den Berg, Infantry.
- Major Charles Herman Vandersluys, Infantry.
- Major Cuthbert Cole Wansbrough, Infantry.
- Captain (acting Major) Stancliffe Wallace Watson, Infantry.
- Major William Percy Wilgar, Canadian Engineers.
- Lieutenant-Colonel Edward Johnston Williams, Canadian Army Medical Corps.

New Zealand Force

- Major Percy Morland Acton-Adams, Mounted Rifles.
- Major Peter Henry Buck, Pioneer Battalion.
- Lieutenant-Colonel Charles Frederick Denman Cook, Infantry Regiment.
- Major Henry James Daltry, Field Artillery.
- Major John Evelyn Duigan, Staff Corps.
- Lieutenant-Colonel Murray Menzies Gardner, Field Artillery.
- Lieutenant-Colonel Alfred Henry Herbert, Army Ordnance Corps.
- Temporary Lieutenant-Colonel Joseph Garrett Roache, Rifle Brigade.
- Major John Llewellyn Saunders.
- Lieutenant-Colonel Hugh Stewart, MC.
- Major Thomas Duncan MacGregor Stout, Medical Corps.
- Lieutenant-Colonel Frank Symon, CMG, Artillery.

South African Contingent

- Temporary Major Frederick Leslie Brown, South African Service Corps.
- Major Colin Clarke, South African Engineers.
- Lieutenant-Colonel Robert Laurie Girdwood, South African Medical Corps.
- Major Charles Norman Hoy.
- Major Carl Johannes Kreft, South African Infantry.
- Major Joachim Frederick Reinhold Lauth, South African Infantry.
- Lieutenant-Colonel George Abbott Morris.
- Temporary Captain (acting Major) Arthur Gilbert Mullins, South African Artillery.
- Major George Parson.
- Major (acting Lieutenant-Colonel) Robert Norman Pringle, South African Medical Corps.
- Temporary Major Frederick Spence Tatham, General List (Lieutenant-Colonel, Reserve of Officers, South African Defence Force).
- Temporary Major Ralph Beresford Turner, South African Forces.
- Lieutenant-Colonel Herbert Wynne Vaughan-Williams, South African Medical Corps.

=== Distinguished Service Cross (DSC) ===
- Assistant Paymaster Lawrence William Williams, Royal Naval Reserve.

=== Royal Red Cross (RRC) ===
First Class

- Superintending Sister Flora Tindal Greig.
- Miss Gertrude Mary Allen, Acting Matron, Queen Alexandra's Imperial Military Nursing Service.
- Miss Hilda Davidge, Assistant Matron, Territorial Force Nursing Service.
- Miss Eva Cicely Fox, ARRC, Acting Matron, Queen Alexandra's Imperial Military Nursing Service.
- Miss Anne Mclnnis Forrest, Nursing Sister, Canadian Army Medical Corps.
- Miss Elizabeth Clement Humphreys, Matron, Queen Alexandra's Imperial Military Nursing Service.
- Miss Frances Rosa Holmes, Acting Matron, Queen Alexandra's Imperial Military Nursing Service.
- Miss Mollie Jones, Sister (acting Matron), Territorial Force Nursing Service.
- Miss Edith Mary Lyde, ARRC, Acting Matron, Queen Alexandra's Imperial Military Nursing Service.
- Miss Rose Emmeline Lumsden, Sister (acting Matron), Queen Alexandra's Imperial Military Nursing Service Reserve.
- Miss Ethel Jane Minns, ARRC, Acting Matron, Queen Alexandra's Imperial Military Nursing Service.
- Miss Annie Cecilia Mowat, ARRC, Acting Matron, Queen Alexandra's Imperial Military Nursing Service.
- Miss Maude Leslie Martin, Matron, Territorial Force Nursing Service.
- Miss Jean Matheson, Nursing Sister (acting Assistant Matron), Canadian Army Nursing Service.
- Miss Laura Niven, Matron, South African Military Nursing Services Hospital Ship.
- Miss Patricia A. O'Curran, Sister (acting Matron), Queen Alexandra's Imperial Military Nursing Service Reserve.
- Mrs Edith Helen Phillips, ARRC, Nursing Service.
- Miss Frances Maude Rice, ARRC, Sister, Territorial Force Nursing Service.
- Miss Jessie Smales, Sister (acting Assistant Matron), Territorial Force Nursing Service.
- Miss Marion Smith, ARRC, Acting Matron, Queen Alexandra's Imperial Military Nursing Service.
- Miss Ada Taylor, Assistant Matron, Territorial Force Nursing Service.
- Miss Lorna Beatrice Wood, Montaza Palace Hospital.

Second Class

- Miss Mary Ashlin-Thomas, Matron, British Red Cross Society.
- Miss Mary Macdonald Aitkin, Acting Sister, Queen Alexandra's Imperial Military Nursing Service Reserve.
- Miss Gertrude Jean Arthur, Staff Nurse, Territorial Force Nursing Service.
- Miss Frances Mary Louisa Allen, Sister, Territorial Force Nursing Service.
- Miss Helen Aukett, Nursing Service.
- Miss Elsie Blackburn, Staff Nurse, Territorial Force Nursing Service.
- Miss Jennie Wilhelmina Blyth, Acting Sister, Civil Hospital Reserve (Glasgow Royal).
- Miss Louise Brock, Nursing Sister, Canadian Army Nursing Service.
- Miss Jean Binnie Buckham, Sister, Queen Alexandra's Imperial Military Nursing Service Reserve, Australia.
- Miss Edith Barker, Sister, South African Military Nursing Services.
- Miss Ellen Elizabeth Baldrey, Sister, Queen Alexandra's Imperial Military Nursing Service Reserve.
- Miss Edith Frances Coombe, Sister, British Red Cross Society.
- Miss Gertrude Emily Custance, Acting Sister, Queen Alexandra's Imperial Military Nursing Service Reserve.
- Miss Mary Coupar, Sister, Territorial Force Nursing Service.
- Miss Jean Elizabeth Carter, Staff Nurse, Queen Alexandra's Imperial Military Nursing Service Reserve, 15th British Hospital.
- Miss Effie Sloan Clark, Sister, Territorial Force Nursing Service.
- Miss Annie Eleanor Casserley, Acting Sister, Civil Hospital Reserve (Liverpool Southern).
- Miss Annie Harriet Esden, Acting Matron, Queen Alexandra's Imperial Military Nursing Service.
- Miss Winifred Ayre Evers, Acting Sister, Civil Hospital Reserve (Edinburgh Royal Infirmary).
- Miss Mary Amilia Early, Staff Nurse, New Zealand Army Nursing Service.
- Miss Mary Gladys Foley, Acting Sister Queen Alexandra's Imperial Military Nursing Service.
- Miss Alice Louisa Florence FitzGerald, Acting Sister, Queen Alexandra's Imperial Military Nursing Service Reserve.
- Miss Kathleen Fisher, Voluntary Aid Detachment.
- Miss Margaret Grieg, Acting Sister, Civil Hospital Reserve (Great Northern Central).
- Miss Harriet Graham, Nursing Sister, Canadian Army Medical Corps.
- Miss Sybil Senior Gardiner, Sister, Queen Alexandra's Imperial Military Nursing Service Reserve.
- Miss Phoebe Margaret Griffith, Sister, Queen Alexandra's Imperial Military Nursing Service Reserve.
- Miss Laura Adelaide Gamble, Nursing Sister, Canadian Army Nursing Service.
- Miss Dorothea Elizabeth Grant, Staff Nurse, Queen Alexandra's Imperial Military Nursing Service Reserve.
- Miss Gladys Augusta Howe, Assistant Matron, Queen Alexandra's Imperial Military Nursing Service.
- Miss Harriet Florence Heinrich, Sister, Territorial Force Nursing Service.
- Miss Margaret Brown Heggie, Acting Sister Civil Hospital Reserve (Glasgow Royal).
- Miss Constance Winifred Jones, Acting Sister, Queen Alexandra's Imperial Military Nursing Service.
- Miss Mabelle Clara Jamieson, Nursing Sister, Canadian Army Medical Corps.
- Miss Letitia Gasse Kelly, Sister, American Nursing Service.
- Miss Edith Maud Lyle, Assistant Matron, Territorial Force Nursing Service.
- Miss Winifred Linton, Sister, Queen Alexandra's Imperial Military Nursing Service Reserve.
- MissGeorgina Ellen Litton, Sister, Territorial Force Nursing Service.
- Miss Mary McLean Loughron, Acting Sister, Queen Alexandra's Imperial Military Nursing Service (Australia).
- Miss Kathleen Little, Nursing Sister, Canadian Army Medical Corps.
- Miss Mary McBeth, Sister, New Zealand Army Nursing Service.
- Miss Lizzie McEachern, Sister, Canadian Army Nursing Service.
- Miss Elizabeth Martin, Sister, Territorial Force Nursing Service.
- Miss Georgianna Beach McCullough, Nursing Sister, Canadian Army Nursing Service.
- Miss Gladys Miller, Staff Nurse, Territorial Force Nursing Service.
- Miss Jessie Marjorie Morris, Sister, Queen Alexandra's Imperial Military Nursing Service Reserve.
- Miss Mary Ethel Morrison, Nursing Sister, Canadian Army Nursing Service.
- Miss Jean McGeorge, Staff Nurse, Queen Alexandra's Imperial Military Nursing Service Reserve, British Stationary Hospital.
- Mrs Margaret Mackenzie, Nursing Service.
- Miss Janet S. H. Niccol, Staff Nurse, Territorial Force Nursing Service.
- Miss Annie Newcome, Senior Nursing Sister, East African Nursing Service.
- Miss Mary Cecil Elizabeth Newman, Sister, Queen Alexandra's Imperial Military Nursing Service.
- Mrs Morris Nicoll, Nursing Service.
- Miss Ida O'Dwyer, Sister, Army Nursing Service.
- Miss Margaret O'Brien, Acting Sister, Civil Hospital Reserve (Dr. Stevens Hospital, Dublin).
- Miss Agatha Mary Phillips, Acting Matron, Queen Alexandra's Imperial Military Nursing Service.
- Miss Clara May Robinson, Sister, Queen Alexandra's Imperial Military Nursing Service Reserve.
- Miss Florence Harriet Rapson, Sister, Queen Alexandra's Imperial Military Nursing Service Reserve.
- Miss Helen Ryder, Sister, Territorial Force Nursing Service.
- Miss Jessie Spittall, Sister, Territorial Force Nursing Service.
- Miss Marie Phoebe Storey, Sister, Queen Alexandra's Imperial Military Nursing Service Reserve.
- Miss Mary Smith, Sister, Territorial Force Nursing Service.
- Miss Constance Evelyn Strange, Acting Sister, Civil Hospital Reserve (Guy's).
- Mrs Nina Stapledon, Voluntary Aid Detachment.
- Mrs Florence Spratt, Nursing Service.
- Miss Helen Elizabeth Tait, Head Sister, Army Nursing Service.
- Miss Ella Jane Tucker, Sister, Army Nursing Service.
- Miss Agnes Martha Brownlie Taylor, Acting Sister, Civil Hospital Reserve (St. Bartholomew's).
- Miss Rubie White, Sister, Queen Alexandra's Imperial Military Nursing Service Reserve.
- Miss Catherine Wilkie Wilson, Sister, Territorial Force Nursing Service.
- Miss Dorothy Wilson, Acting Sister, Civil Hospital Reserve (Guy's).
- Miss Minnie Wood, Acting Sister Queen Alexandra's Imperial Military Nursing Service.
- Miss Elizabeth Susanna Wessels, Nursing Sister, South African Military Nursing Service.
- Miss Agnes Wyllie, Sister, Queen Alexandra's Imperial Military Nursing Service Australia.

=== Imperial Service Order (ISO) ===
Home Civil Service

- Arthur Edward Adeney, Vice-Controller of the London Postal Service.
- Alexander Richard Barlas, Secretary to the Local Government Board, Ireland.
- Henry Fathers, Deputy Superintendent of Ordnance Stores, Admiralty.
- Jeremiah Fishwick, Sub-Inspector of Schools, Board of Education.
- Robert Henderson Gray, Secretary to the Registrar-General for Scotland.
- Thomas Bartholomew Hildesley, Chief Clerk, Reformatory and Industrial Schools Department.
- Daniel Arthur Leak, Staff Clerk, Foreign Office.
- Richard Edward Martyr, First Class Clerk, Board of Agriculture and Fisheries.
- Samuel Alexander Sketchley, Principal Clerk, Royal Arsenal.

Indian Civil Service

- Arthur John Pattle, Senior Clerk, Accountant-General's Department.
- Felix Ambrose LeMeur, Deputy Registrar, Chief Court, Punjab.
- M.R.Ry. Diwan Bahadur Lewis Dominic Swamikannu Pillai Avargal, MA, BL, LLB, Provincial Service, Registrar, Cooperative Credit Societies, Madras.
- Charles Henderson Jeffery-Orchard, Senior Assistant Commissioner, Northern India Salt Revenue Department, Sambhar Lake Division, Rajputana.
- Rao Bahadur Davabhai Surajlal Thathi, Chief Accountant, Office of Superintendent of Customs, Salt and Opium, Bombay.
- Charles O'Hagan Teeling, Superintendent in the Foreign and Political Department, Government of India.
- Raj Bahadur Priya Nath Mukharji, Provincial Executive Service, Inspector-General of Registration, Bengal, and an Additional Member of the Council of the Governor for making Laws and Regulations.
- Lieutenant John Arthur Hamilton, Royal Engineers, Indo-European Telegraph Department, in charge of the Telegraph Office, Basrah, Persian Gulf.
- Raj Bahadur Lala Ganga Sahai, MA, Provincial Service, Punjab, Dewan and Chief Secretary to His Highness the Raja of Faridkot, Punjab.
- Captain Douglas William Mew Gumbley, Royal Engineers, Indo-European Telegraph Department, assistant director of Telegraphs, Persian Gulf.
- Khan Bahadur Qazi Aziz-ud-Din Ahmad, Provincial Service, United Provinces, Judicial Secretary to His Highness the Maharaja of Dholpur, Rajputana.

Colonial Civil Service

- Alfred Karslake Bovill, Principal Forest Officer, Cyprus.
- Louis Ogilvy Chitty, Treasurer, Collector of Customs and Manager of Saving Bank, Colony of Seychelles.
- Pierre Martial Côté, KC, Chief, Remission Branch, Department of Justice, Dominion of Canada.
- Edmond Power Dowley, Third Metropolitan Stipendiary Magistrate, State of Western Australia.
- Acheson Arundel Cameron Finlay, Senior Assistant Colonial Secretary, Gold Coast Colony.
- Joseph Hughes, Commissioner of Income Tax, State of Queensland.
- Lieutenant-Colonel Thomas George Johnston Loggie, Deputy Minister of Lands and Mines, Province of New Brunswick.
- William Russell Morris, Secretary, Post and Telegraph Department, Dominion of New Zealand.
- Henry Benjamin Shawe, Under Secretary, Department of the Interior, Union of South Africa.

=== Military Cross (MC) ===
Awarded a Bar to the Military Cross

- Captain Patrick Campbell Anderson, MC, Seaforth Highlanders.
- Captain Robert Cecil Hardingham, MC, Middlesex Regiment.
- Lieutenant (Temporary Captain) Percy Clerk Sherren, MC, Canadian Local Forces and Royal Flying Corps.
- 2nd Lieutenant John Vicary, MC, Gloucestershire Regiment.

Awarded the Military Cross

- Quartermaster and Honorary Lieutenant William Edward Acraman, Grenadier Guards.
- Temporary Lieutenant Walwyn Trerice Adams, East Yorkshire Regiment.
- Temporary Captain James Carlton Addy, East Yorkshire Regiment.
- Reverend John Orfeur Aglionby, MA, Temporary Chaplain to the Forces, 4th Class, Army Chaplains' Department.
- 2nd Lieutenant (temporary Captain) Geoffrey Dawson Ainger, Yorkshire Light Infantry.
- Captain Rowland Montagu Airey, Army Service Corps.
- 2nd Lieutenant (temporary Captain) Robert Scott Aiton, Royal Field Artillery.
- Temporary Lieutenant Thomas Frederick William Stead Alban, Royal Engineers.
- Captain Christopher Alexander, Indian Army.
- Captain Martin Alexander, Rifle Brigade.
- Temporary Captain George Oliver Fairtlough Alley, MB, Royal Army Medical Corps.
- Lieutenant (temporary Captain) Stephen Alley, Yeomanry.
- Captain William Hamilton Stirling Alston, Rifle Brigade.
- 17061 Company Sergeant Major William John Ambrose, Machine Gun Corps.
- Lieutenant (temporary Captain) Stephen Lewis Amos, Royal Dublin Fusiliers.
- Captain Gordon Henry Anderson, Hussars, Special Reserve.
- Captain Horace Anderson, Royal Irish Regiment.
- Temporary Lieutenant John Edward Anderson, Royal Engineers.
- Temporary Captain Leslie Ernest Andrews, Royal West Surrey Regiment.
- 2nd Lieutenant (temporary Lieutenant) Allen Algernon Lord Apsley, Yeomanry.
- Lieutenant Maurice Armitage Arbuthnot, Lancers, Special Reserve.
- Captain Henry William Richard Armstrong, East Surrey Regiment.
- 17781 Company Sergeant Major Wybugh Thompson Armstrong, Liverpool Regiment.
- Temporary Lieutenant William Noel Arnold, Royal Field Artillery.
- Temporary 2nd Lieutenant Edward Alban Atkins, Royal Garrison Artillery.
- 2nd Lieutenant William Thomas Styan Atkinson, Royal Field Artillery, Special Reserve.
- Temporary Lieutenant (acting Captain) Guy Auten, Durham Light Infantry.
- Captain Leonard Barren Baird, Royal Army Medical Corps.
- 2nd Lieutenant (temporary Captain) George Brindley Aufrere Baker, Royal Berkshire Regiment and Royal Flying Corps.
- Lieutenant John Balfour, Scots Guards, Special Reserve.
- Lieutenant (acting Captain) John Melville Balfour, Royal Field Artillery.
- 2nd Lieutenant (temporary Lieutenant) Harry Theodore Bamberger, Middlesex Regiment, Special Reserve.
- Temporary Lieutenant George Adolphus Bambridge, Royal Engineers.
- Temporary Lieutenant Alec Joscelyne Bamford, Motor Machine Gun Corps.
- Temporary Captain Philip Stanley Barber, Dorsetshire Regiment.
- Captain Alfred Raymond Bare, North Lancashire Regiment.
- Temporary Captain Edward Arthur Barker, Royal Engineers (Quartermaster and Hon. Lieutenant, York and Lancaster Regiment).
- Captain Evelyn Hugh Barker, King's Royal Rifle Corps.
- Temporary 2nd Lieutenant John William Barker, Manchester Regiment.
- Lieutenant James Hugh Barnes, Intelligence Corps.
- Temporary Quartermaster and Honorary Lieutenant Benjamin Bartholomew, North Lancashire Regiment.
- 2nd Lieutenant (temporary Captain) Edward George Bartlett, Yorkshire Light Infantry.
- Lieutenant Basil Kelsey Barton, Royal Field Artillery.
- Captain Robert Bath, Royal Horse Artillery.
- Lieutenant (acting Captain) Richard Tennant Baxter, Royal Field Artillery.
- Captain Joseph Herbert Bayley, Royal Army Medical Corps, Special Reserve.
- 2nd Lieutenant Denham Lambert Henry Baynes, Royal Garrison Artillery, Special Reserve.
- 2nd Lieutenant (temporary Captain) Ralph Arthur Beckett, Yeomanry.
- Captain Merton Beckwith Beckwith-Smith, DSO, Coldstream Guards.
- Temporary 2nd Lieutenant Alexander James Bartlet Begg, Northumberland Fusiliers.
- Quartermaster and Honorary Lieutenant George Bennett, East Lancashire Regiment.
- Temporary Captain John Bennett, Royal Field Artillery.
- Temporary 2nd Lieutenant Fred Roland Berridge, Northamptonshire Regiment.
- Captain John Arrowsmith Best, Army Service Corps.
- Temporary Captain Antony Patrick Laurence Bethell, Gordon Highlanders.
- Captain John Henry Bevan, Hertfordshire Regiment.
- Captain Frederick William Bewsher, London Regiment.
- Captain Frederic William Lyon Bissett, Duke of Cornwall's Light Infantry.
- Lieutenant (temporary Captain) Archibald William Blair, Highland Light Infantry.
- Temporary Lieutenant Claud Leslie Blair, Royal Engineers.
- Captain Patrick Alexander Blair, Royal Scots.
- Captain Thomas Blatherwick, Manchester Regiment.
- Lieutenant (temporary Captain) William Blezard, Royal Field Artillery.
- 2nd Lieutenant (temporary Captain) Theodore Stephen Bliss, Royal Engineers.
- 2nd Lieutenant (acting Captain) Reginald Masters Blofeld, London Regiment.
- 2nd Lieutenant (now temporary Major) Archie Vyvyan Board, Essex Regiment, Special Reserve.
- 2nd Lieutenant (temporary Lieutenant) James Main Linton Bogle, Royal Engineers.
- 14396 Company Sergeant Major Albert Bonser, Shropshire Light Infantry.
- 2nd Lieutenant Arnold John Booth, Royal Garrison Artillery.
- 2nd Lieutenant (temporary Captain) Henry Booth, Hussars, Special Reserve.
- Temporary Lieutenant Frederick Charles Boulter, Royal Field Artillery.
- 2nd Lieutenant (temporary Captain) Frederick Henry Bousfield, Durham Light Infantry.
- Temporary Lieutenant William Henry Bowsher, Manchester Regiment.
- Temporary Captain Clive Frederick Bowman, Army Service Corps.
- Temporary Captain John Howard Box, MB, Royal Army Medical Corps.
- Quartermaster and Honorary Captain John Boyd, Coldstream Guards.
- Reverend Robert McNeil Boyd, Temporary Chaplain to the Forces, 4th Class, Army Chaplains' Department.
- Lieutenant (temporary Captain) George Lawden Boys-Stones, Indian Army.
- Temporary Captain John Edward Warner Boyes, Royal Engineers.
- 2nd Lieutenant (temporary Captain) Philip Brachi, Royal Garrison Artillery.
- Captain Edward de Winton Herbert Bradley, Yorkshire Light Infantry.
- Temporary Captain Vernon Albert Bradshaw, Graves Registration Section.
- Temporary Captain Francis Jonathan Brazier, Worcestershire Regiment.
- Captain George Vernon Breffit, Shropshire Light Infantry.
- Lieutenant (temporary Captain) Lawrence Borie Brierley, Royal Engineers.
- Quartermaster and Honorary Lieutenant Alick Briggs, Royal Inniskilling Fusiliers.
- Temporary Captain William Harley Brindley, Royal Warwickshire Regiment.
- Temporary Captain Philip Mainwaring Broadmead, King's Royal Rifle Corps.
- Temporary Lieutenant (temporary Captain) Charles Gerald Brocklebank, Royal Engineers, Special Reserve.
- Captain Ralph Alexander Broderick, Royal Army Medical Corps.
- Temporary Captain Douglas Cecil Jack Brooks, Royal Welsh Fusiliers.
- Captain James Hardie Brown, Argyll and Sutherland Highlanders.
- Temporary Captain John Vassie Brown, MB, Royal Army Medical Corps.
- Temporary Captain Leonard Graham Brown, Royal Army Medical Corps.
- Reverend Francis Mary Browne, Temporary Chaplain to the Forces, 4th Class, Army Chaplains' Department.
- Temporary Lieutenant Hugh Alexander Edgar Browne, Royal Engineers.
- 2nd Lieutenant Herbert Osborn Browning, West Riding Regiment.
- Temporary Captain George J. Bruce, General List.
- Temporary Captain William Frederick Beadon Bryant, Royal Engineers.
- Captain Arthur Lonsdale Bryham, Manchester Regiment.
- 2nd Lieutenant Reginald Eric Buckingham, Royal Flying Corps, Special Reserve.
- Temporary Captain Felix George Buckley, Northumberland Fusiliers.
- Temporary Lieutenant Francis George Bull, Royal Fusiliers.
- Lieutenant Leslie Colyn Bull, South Staffordshire Regiment.
- Captain Arthur Edwin Bullock, MB, Royal Army Medical Corps.
- Temporary Captain Leslie Dyne Burchell, Army Service Corps.
- Temporary Captain James Charles Burdett, Leicestershire Regiment.
- Lieutenant (temporary Captain) Launcelot Henry Beaumont Burlton, Army Service Corps.
- Temporary Captain William Alexander Burn, South Wales Borderers.
- Temporary Lieutenant (acting Captain) Douglas Easton Burnett, Gordon Highlanders.
- 2nd Lieutenant (temporary Lieutenant) Charles Hearn Oscar Dudley Burrell, Leicestershire Regiment.
- Temporary Lieutenant Ralph Darker Butterell, Machine Gun Corps.
- Temporary 2nd Lieutenant Joseph Gerald Butterfield, Royal Field Artillery.
- Temporary Lieutenant (temporary Captain) Edward Eric Calvert, East Yorkshire Regiment.
- 2nd Lieutenant Alexander Cameron, Royal Engineers.
- Temporary Lieutenant (temporary Captain) David Campbell, Royal Irish Rifles.
- Lieutenant John MacKnight Campbell, Royal Scots.
- Temporary Lieutenant Eric Thomas Caparn, Royal Engineers.
- Temporary 2nd Lieutenant George Edward Cardwell, South Wales Borderers.
- Temporary Captain William Warren Carey-Thomas, General List and Royal Flying Corps.
- Honorary Lieutenant Edmund Laurence Carlisle, Intelligence Corps.
- Temporary Lieutenant William Alexander Carruthers, Northumberland Fusiliers.
- Temporary Captain Leonard Castle, General List (2nd Lieutenant, Reserve of Officers).
- Captain Christopher Arthur Mohun Cator, Scots Guards, Special Reserve.
- 2nd Lieutenant (temporary Lieutenant) Francis Oswin Cave, Rifle Brigade and Royal Flying Corps.
- Temporary Lieutenant (temporary Captain) James Francis Chadwick, Royal Engineers.
- Captain John Chamberlain, South Wales Borderers, Special Reserve.
- Captain Henry Champion de Crespigny, Indian Army.
- Temporary Inspector of Ordnance Machinery 2nd Class and Temporary Honorary Captain John Gardiner Chapple, Advanced Ordnance Depot.
- Temporary Lieutenant (temporary Captain) Noel Hughes Havelock Charles, General List.
- 2nd Lieutenant (temporary Captain) Arthur Nesbit Charlton, Norfolk Regiment.
- Temporary Lieutenant Herbert Reginald Charter, General List.
- Temporary Lieutenant Alfred Saward Chenevix-Trench, Royal Engineers.
- 2nd Lieutenant (temporary Lieutenant) Ronald Christie, Army Service Corps.
- Captain Arthur Vesey Meade, Earl of Clanwilliam, Reserve of Officers.
- Temporary 2nd Lieutenant Frederick Horace Clapham, Royal Irish Rifles.
- Captain Albert Nettleton Clark, London Regiment.
- Lieutenant (temporary Captain) John George Walters Clark, Lancers.
- Temporary Captain (now acting Major) Percy William Clark, Royal Engineers.
- Temporary 2nd Lieutenant (acting Captain) Amos Clarkson, General List (formerly West Yorkshire Regiment).
- Temporary 2nd Lieutenant Robert Hugh Clay, Lincolnshire Regiment.
- Temporary Captain Julian Clement, Hampshire Regiment.
- Temporary Lieutenant Ralph Egerton Clilverd, Royal Field Artillery.
- Temporary Captain John Clisdal, General List and Royal Flying Corps.
- Lieutenant (now acting Major) Maurice Clowes, Royal Horse Artillery.
- Captain Walter John Jackson Coats, Highland Light Infantry.
- Temporary Captain Aubrey du Plat Thorold Cole, General List (late Captain, Dragoon Guards.).
- Lieutenant (acting Captain) Thomas Stephenson Cole, Royal Engineers, Special Reserve.
- 2nd Lieutenant Frederick George Coles, Royal Field Artillery.
- Temporary Lieutenant (temporary Captain) Francis Jervoise Collas, Royal Field Artillery.
- Temporary Lieutenant Charles John Comins, Royal Field Artillery.
- 2nd Lieutenant Frank William Edwin Cook, Royal Field Artillery.
- Temporary Captain Edward Robert Cecil Cooke, Royal Army Medical Corps.
- Quartermaster and Honorary Lieutenant Arthur Coombs, Rifle Brigade.
- Lieutenant Arthur Cooper, Royal Scots Fusiliers.
- Captain George Chamberlain Cooper, Indian Army.
- Honorary Lieutenant Percival Harold Cooper, Intelligence Corps.
- Captain William Rowland Frederic Cooper, Dragoon Guards.
- Lieutenant (acting Captain) Felix Alexander Vincent Copland-Griffiths, Welsh Guards.
- Company Sergeant Major (acting Regimental Sergeant Major) James Corrigan, Royal Lancaster Regiment.
- Captain Joseph Mary Aloysius Costello, MB, Royal Army Medical Corps.
- Temporary Lieutenant Peter James Cottle, Royal Engineers (2nd Lieutenant, Royal Engineers, Territorial Force).
- Captain William Ernest Leslie Cotton, Worcestershire Regiment.
- Captain Alexander Comrie Cowan, Royal Scots, Special Reserve.
- Temporary Lieutenant (acting Captain) Wellwood Cowan, Royal Engineers.
- Temporary Captain Henry Jessop Coxhead, Royal Sussex Regiment.
- 2nd Lieutenant Hubert Crampton, Manchester Regiment.
- Temporary Lieutenant George Leonard Crandon, Suffolk Regiment.
- Temporary Lieutenant John Stanhope Crawhall, Royal Engineers.
- Temporary Lieutenant William Arthur Crebbin, Rifle Brigade.
- Temporary Lieutenant (acting Captain) George William Creeth, Royal Engineers.
- Temporary Lieutenant (now acting Major) Eric Crewdson, Royal Engineers.
- 2nd Lieutenant Bernard Patrick Cromie, Royal Field Artillery.
- Lieutenant Charles Ralli Cross, Royal Garrison Artillery.
- Quartermaster and Honorary Captain Frederick Clements Cross, Royal Fusiliers.
- Temporary Captain John Frederick Cubbon, Royal Engineers.
- Temporary Lieutenant Harold John Cunningham, Bedfordshire Regiment.
- 2nd Lieutenant St. Clair Usher Cunningham, Royal Field Artillery.
- Captain Henry Osborne Curtis, King's Royal Rifle Corps.
- Captain George Dalziel, MB, Royal Army Medical Corps, Special Reserve.
- Lieutenant (temporary Captain) Hugh Nares Davenport, Oxfordshire and Buckinghamshire Light Infantry.
- Temporary Captain Alexander Davidson, Army Service Corps.
- Temporary Lieutenant Leslie Frederic St. John Davies, Machine Gun Corps, late Norfolk Regiment.
- 2nd Lieutenant (acting Captain) Frank Chaplin Davis, Gloucestershire Regiment, Special Reserve.
- 2nd Lieutenant Frederick Clifton Dawkins, Royal Field Artillery, Special Reserve.
- Captain Gerald Anthony Debenham, Rhodesia Police.
- Captain Vivian Leslie de Cordova, Royal Lancaster Regiment.
- 16397 Regimental Sergeant Major James Christopher de Lacy, Royal Irish Rifles.
- Temporary Lieutenant (temporary Captain) Gerald Hugh de La Pasture, King's African Rifles.
- Temporary 2nd Lieutenant Montague Roger Dell, East Surrey Regiment.
- Captain Reginald Iveson Denham, Royal Engineers, attached Signal Company.
- Temporary Lieutenant Wilfred Dennes, Royal Field Artillery.
- Captain Arthur Dent, Army Service Corps.
- Temporary Captain Waldemar Max de Paula, Gloucestershire Regiment.
- Captain Francis Mackenzie Dick, Nottinghamshire and Derbyshire Regiment.
- Temporary Lieutenant Watson Tulloch Dick, South Wales Borderers.
- Lieutenant John Dickinson, Royal Field Artillery.
- Temporary Captain John Robert Dickinson, Royal Lancaster Regiment.
- 2nd Lieutenant (temporary Lieutenant) Stanley Longstaffe Dickinson, Royal Field Artillery.
- 2nd Lieutenant (temporary Lieutenant) Utrick William Dickinson, Royal Field Artillery.
- Captain William Vicris Digby Dickinson, South Wales Borderers.
- Captain Arthur Norman Dickson, MD, India Medical Service.
- Lieutenant John Joseph Dillon, Connaught Rangers, Special Reserve.
- Temporary Captain Charles Jecks Dixon, South Lancashire Regiment.
- Temporary 2nd Lieutenant David Sydney Doig, Royal Field Artillery.
- Lieutenant Hugh Brandon Dooner, Intelligence Corps.
- 56 Company Sergeant Major Percy Sholto Douglas, Durham Light Infantry.
- Temporary 2nd Lieutenant Eric Downes, Royal Engineers.
- 2nd Lieutenant Arthur James Draper, South Lancashire Regiment.
- Temporary Lieutenant John Douglas Drayson, Royal Field Artillery.
- Quartermaster and Honorary Lieutenant (temporary Captain) William Drummond, Gordon Highlanders.
- 2nd Lieutenant (acting Captain) William Miller Drummond, Cameron Highlanders.
- Temporary Captain John Terence Duffin, General List.
- Temporary Lieutenant William James Duffy, Royal Highlanders.
- Captain William George Dunlop, Royal Horse Artillery.
- Temporary Lieutenant (acting Captain) Frank Rogers Durham, Royal Engineers.
- Reverend Alfred George Duthie, Temporary Chaplain to the Forces, 4th Class, Army Chaplains' Department.
- Quartermaster and Honorary Lieutenant (temporary Captain) Ernest Dwyer, Army Service Corps.
- Temporary Captain James Percy Earp, Advanced Ordnance Depot.
- Lieutenant Herbert (temporary Captain) John Eastwood, Rifle Brigade.
- Temporary 2nd Lieutenant (temporary Lieutenant) Robert Anthony Eden, King's Royal Rifle Corps.
- Temporary Lieutenant (acting Captain) Terence Eden, Motor Machine Gun Corps.
- Temporary Captain Cyril Ernest Edwards, Royal Fusiliers.
- 2nd Lieutenant Walter Bernard Edwards, Worcestershire Regiment, Special Reserve.
- Temporary 2nd Lieutenant Reginald Donald Ellis, Durham Light Infantry.
- Lieutenant Robert Ellis, MB, Royal Army Medical Corps, Special Reserve.
- 2nd Lieutenant (temporary Captain) Wilfrid Spencer Ellis, Royal Lancaster Regiment.
- Lieutenant Cuthbert Ernest M. Ellison, Grenadier Guards.
- 2nd Lieutenant Albert Alfred Emmett, Royal Field Artillery, Special Reserve.
- Lieutenant (temporary Captain) William Edward Euler, Royal Engineers.
- Captain Arthur Kelly Evans, Royal Marine Light Infantry.
- Reverend Geoffrey Maynard Evans, Temporary Chaplain to the Forces, 4th Class, Army Chaplains' Department.
- Lieutenant (acting Captain) John Michael Evans-Lombe, Royal Field Artillery.
- Temporary Captain John St. Foyne Fair, Graves Registration Section.
- 2nd Lieutenant Donald Charles Fairbairn, Royal Garrison Artillery, Special Reserve.
- 2nd Lieutenant Edmund William Fane-de-Salis, King's Royal Rifle Corps.
- Lieutenant (acting Captain) Frederick Herbert Fardell, Royal Field Artillery.
- Lieutenant Thomas Gordon Fawcett, Royal Engineers.
- 2nd Lieutenant (temporary Captain) Walter Lindley Fawcett, West Yorkshire Regiment.
- Temporary 2nd Lieutenant Thomas Featherstone, Worcestershire Regiment.
- Lieutenant (acting Captain) William Charles Fenton, West Riding Regiment.
- Temporary Lieutenant Cecil Leonard Ferard, Royal Field Artillery.
- Lieutenant (temporary Captain) Stanley Howse Fisher, Royal Engineers.
- 2nd Lieutenant (temporary Captain) William Edward Fisher, Gloucestershire Regiment.
- Lieutenant (temporary Captain) Leopold George Fisher-Rowe, Grenadier Guards, Special Reserve.
- Temporary (temporary Captain) 2nd Lieutenant Edward Walter Robert FitzGerald, General List.
- Temporary Captain Edward William FitzGerald, Army Service Corps.
- Captain Sir John Peter Gerald Maurice Fitzgerald, Bt, Royal Horse Guards.
- Temporary Lieutenant Robert Brinsley FitzGerald, General List.
- Captain Arnold Vesey FitzHerbert, Irish Horse.
- Lieutenant (temporary Captain) John William Fitzherbert-Brockholes, Yeomanry.
- Lieutenant Wilfred George Flack, Royal Fusiliers.
- Temporary 2nd Lieutenant Frederick Dicker Fletcher, Kings Royal Rifle Corps.
- Captain Stephen Flowers, Royal Engineers.
- 2nd Lieutenant (acting Captain) Sidney Frank Fooks, London Regiment.
- Captain William Edward Footner, Army Veterinary Corps, Special Reserve.
- 2nd Lieutenant (temporary Lieutenant) Robert Forbes, Royal Highlanders.
- Temporary Captain Gordon Miller Forde, Royal Inniskilling Fusiliers.
- 2nd Lieutenant (acting Lieutenant) Charles Ernest Philip Foreshew, Oxfordshire and Buckinghamshire Light Infantry, Special Reserves.
- 2nd Lieutenant Thomas Henry Fox, Royal Garrison Artillery.
- Lieutenant (temporary Captain) Robert Charles Frain, Royal Artillery.
- Temporary Lieutenant Hugh Gordon Francis, Royal Engineers.
- 2nd Lieutenant William Glover Frend, Royal Field Artillery.
- Temporary Captain William Edington Furneaux, Seaforth Highlanders.
- Captain George Burford Fyldes, Nottinghamshire and Derbyshire Regiment.
- 2nd Lieutenant (temporary Captain) William George Gabain, Unattached List.
- Temporary Lieutenant James Francis Gadd, South Staffordshire Regiment.
- Temporary Captain Herbert John Sherwood Gaine, General List.
- Captain Thomas Julian Edward Gaisford-St. Lawrence, Seaforth Highlanders, Special Reserve.
- 9617 Acting Regimental Sergeant Major Patrick Wilfred Gallagher, Royal Garrison Artillery.
- 2nd Lieutenant William Charles Vernon Galwey, Royal Irish Regiment.
- Temporary Lieutenant Albert Osborne Gammon, Hampshire Regiment.
- Captain William Tyler Gardiner, MB, FRCS, Royal Army Medical Corps.
- Temporary 2nd Lieutenant Frederick Basil Garner, Royal Field Artillery.
- Lieutenant (temporary Captain) Maurice Houghton Garrard, Yorkshire Light Infantry.
- 2nd Lieutenant Oliver Douglas Garrett, London Regiment.
- Temporary Captain Alen Garthwaite, Wiltshire Regiment.
- Temporary Captain Noel John Hay Gavin, MB, Royal Army Medical Corps.
- Lieutenant Stephen Humphrey Geldard, South Wales Borderers, Special Reserve.
- Captain William George, MB, Royal Army Medical Corps.
- Temporary Lieutenant Ivor Hector German, Hampshire Regiment.
- Lieutenant (temporary Captain) Douglas Stuart Gibbon, Royal Welsh Fusiliers, Special Reserve.
- 2nd Lieutenant (temporary Lieutenant) George Herbert Gibbs, Royal Engineers.
- Temporary 2nd Lieutenant William James Gibbs, East Surrey Regiment.
- Temporary Sub-Lieutenant William Reginald Gibson, RNVR.
- Temporary 2nd Lieutenant Wesley Milum Gibson, Northumberland Fusiliers.
- Temporary Lieutenant (acting Captain) George Henry Gilmore, Royal Sussex Regiment.
- Captain James Donie Glegg, Royal Dublin Fusiliers.
- Temporary Captain (now acting Major) William Henry George Goater, Yorkshire Regiment.
- Captain Ambrose William Goddard, Royal Fusiliers, Special Reserve.
- Temporary Lieutenant Hugh Andrew Gold, East Kent Regiment.
- Temporary Captain John Wilgress Goldson, Northamptonshire Regiment.
- Temporary Captain George Stuart Goldsworthy, King's African Rifles.
- Temporary Captain Edward Maurice Gonner, King's Royal Rifle Corps.
- 2nd Lieutenant Patrick John Goodman, South Lancashire Regiment.
- Temporary Lieutenant Victor Frederick Gordon, General List, formerly Yorkshire Light Infantry.
- Captain Alexander Penrose Gordon-Cumming, Cameron Highlanders.
- Captain Christopher Hugh Gotto, Devonshire Regiment.
- Temporary 2nd Lieutenant John Miller Gow, Royal Field Artillery.
- 2nd Lieutenant William Frank Gower, Royal Field Artillery.
- Lieutenant Thomas Leslie Graham, Seaforth Highlanders, Special Reserve.
- Captain (now temporary Major) John Peter Grant, Cameron Highlanders.
- Deputy Commissioner of Ordnance and Honorary Captain Alexander Gray, Advanced Ordnance Depot.
- Temporary 2nd Lieutenant Mitchell Gray, Royal Engineers.
- Temporary Captain Frederick Russ Graystone, Royal Field Artillery.
- Temporary Captain Bernard Blackwell Green, York and Lancaster Regiment.
- 2nd Lieutenant Herbert Green, Durham Light Infantry.
- 3/10056 Sergeant Major James Green, Norfolk Regiment.
- Temporary 2nd Lieutenant Robert Donald Green, Durham Light Infantry.
- Temporary Captain Wilfred Charles Green, Royal Fusiliers.
- Temporary Captain Leonard Montague Greenwood, Durham Light Infantry.
- Captain Albert David Greig, Royal Garrison Artillery.
- Lieutenant (temporary Captain) William Ernest Gretton, Royal Field Artillery.
- 2nd Lieutenant Albert Thomas Griffiths, Wiltshire Regiment.
- Temporary Captain Joseph Groombridge, King's Royal Rifle Corps.
- Captain Cecil Bernard Gunston, Coldstream Guards, Special Reserves.
- Temporary Lieutenant Nigel Esme Haig, Royal Field Artillery.
- Temporary Lieutenant John Henry Haigh, Royal Irish Rifles.
- Reverend Francis Johnston Halahan, Temporary Chaplain to the Forces, 4th Class, Army Chaplains' Department.
- 2nd Lieutenant (temporary Captain) Francis Edward Hale, Army Service Corps.
- Temporary Captain John Hathorn Hall, Royal Munster Fusiliers.
- Captain (now acting Major) Philip de Havilland Hall, Royal Engineers.
- Captain John Gregson Halsted, North Lancashire Regiment.
- 2nd Lieutenant William Halton, North Lancashire Regiment (now Machine Gun Corps).
- Captain Archibald Francis Hamilton, Indian Army.
- Temporary Lieutenant Charles Keith Johnstone Hamilton, Royal Field Artillery.
- Temporary Captain Douglas Christopher Hamilton, General List.
- Captain Gavin George Lord Hamilton of Dalzell, KT, CVO, Reserve of Officers, Scots Guards.
- Temporary Lieutenant (temporary Captain) Charles Godfrey Handcock, General List.
- Lieutenant (temporary Captain) Stephen Gordon Harbord, Royal Field Artillery.
- 2nd Lieutenant Guy Baldwin Harden, Royal Engineers.
- Temporary Captain David Hardie, MB, Royal Army Medical Corps.
- Lieutenant Arthur Edward Campbell Harris, Indian Army.
- Captain the Hon. George St. Vincent Harris, Yeomanry.
- Temporary Captain Frank Harrison, General List.
- Lieutenant (temporary Captain) William Harriss, Royal Lancaster Regiment.
- Temporary Lieutenant Samuel Hart, Egyptian Army.
- Captain Dermot McKnight Hartigan, Royal Inniskilling Fusiliers.
- Captain Percival Hartley, Royal Army Medical Corps.
- Temporary Lieutenant Herbert Harvey, Machine Gun Corps.
- 2nd Lieutenant (temporary Captain) Alexander Burton Hassall, Cheshire Regiment.
- Temporary Captain (now temporary Major) George White Hawkes, Royal Irish Regiment.
- 2nd Lieutenant Archibald Ashworth Bailie Hay, Royal Field Artillery, Special Reserve.
- 2nd Lieutenant (temporary Captain) James Hay, Lovat's Scouts, attached Royal Engineers.
- Temporary Lieutenant William Hendrie Hay, Royal Field Artillery.
- Lieutenant (temporary Captain) Frank Hayes, Manchester Regiment.
- Lieutenant George Frederick Hayhurst Hayhurst-France, King's Royal Rifle Corps.
- Lieutenant (acting Captain) Alfred Ernest Haynes, Royal Field Artillery.
- 2nd Lieutenant (temporary Captain) Reginald Frederick Johnson Hayward, Wiltshire Regiment.
- Lieutenant Joseph Hazlewood, South Staffordshire Regiment.
- Reverend Frederick Waldegrave Head, Temporary Chaplain to the Forces, 4th Class, Army Chaplains' Department.
- Captain Arthur Stanley Heale, Royal Army Medical Corps.
- 2nd Lieutenant (acting Captain) John Alfred Healing, Royal Warwickshire Regiment, Special Reserve.
- 2nd Lieutenant (temporary Lieutenant) Thomas William Heather, Middlesex Regiment, Special Reserve.
- 2nd Lieutenant (acting Captain) Herbert Edward Heffer, Middlesex Regiment.
- Temporary Captain James Gerald Patrick Heffernan, Royal Dublin Fusiliers.
- Reverend Simon Hegarty, Temporary Chaplain to the Forces, 4th Class, Army Chaplains' Department.
- Lieutenant Maurice Robert Hely-Hutchinson, Irish Guards, Special Reserve.
- 2nd Lieutenant (temporary Captain) Eric Joseph Henderson, Royal Flying Corps, Special Reserve.
- 2nd Lieutenant (temporary Lieutenant) James Thomas Fleming Henderson, Royal Engineers.
- Captain (now temporary Major) Kenneth Douglas Murray Henderson, Indian Army.
- Temporary 2nd Lieutenant Norman Henry, Liverpool Regiment.
- Temporary 2nd Lieutenant Roger Paul Hepburn, Royal Engineers.
- Temporary Lieutenant Philip Hume Herbert, Royal Field Artillery.
- Lieutenant John James Heron, Royal Engineers, Special Reserve.
- Temporary Captain George Christopher Heslop, Durham Light Infantry.
- Lieutenant (temporary Captain) Francis Bland Hewson, York and Lancaster Regiment.
- Temporary Captain (now Acting Major) Donald Hey (Captain, Royal Engineers, Territorial Force).
- Temporary Lieutenant Vyvian Rex Lynn Heywood, Royal Engineers.
- Captain George Hicks, Royal Garrison Artillery.
- Temporary 2nd Lieutenant Henry Ellis Hill, Royal Engineers.
- Lieutenant (temporary Captain) John Sturges Burrow Hill, Buckinghamshire Battalion, attached Oxfordshire and Buckinghamshire Light Infantry.
- Temporary Captain Reginald Playfair Hills, General List, formerly, King's Own Scottish Borderers.
- Temporary Lieutenant Philip Hinckley, Leicestershire Regiment.
- Temporary Captain William Henry Warder Hine, Nottinghamshire and Derbyshire Regiment.
- Temporary Lieutenant Wilfrid Sydney Holbrook, Northumberland Fusiliers.
- 2nd Lieutenant (temporary Lieutenant) Athole Frederick Holden, Yeomanry.
- Lieutenant (temporary Captain) Charles Holland, Royal Flying Corps, Special Reserve.
- 2nd Lieutenant Victor John Holland, Royal Field Artillery.
- Temporary 2nd Lieutenant Percy Collis Hollingsworth, General List and Royal Flying Corps.
- Lieutenant (acting Captain) James Bell Hollwey, Royal Field Artillery.
- Captain Noel Galway Holmes, Royal Irish Regiment.
- 2nd Lieutenant (acting Captain) Geoffrey Wilson Holt, Royal Field Artillery.
- Temporary Captain William Whyte Home, General List.
- Staff Sergeant Major (acting 1st Class Staff Sergeant Major) Henry Smith Hooper, Army Service Corps.
- Captain James Nockells Horlick, Coldstream Guards.
- 2nd Lieutenant Harold Valentine Hosack, Royal Field Artillery, Special Reserve.
- Lieutenant (temporary Captain) Herbert Ronald Hoskins, Royal Warwickshire Regiment.
- Temporary Lieutenant Hugh Lloyd Howard, Royal Engineers.
- Temporary Lieutenant George Eric Howorth, Royal Engineers.
- Temporary Lieutenant William Norman Hoyte, Nottinghamshire and Derbyshire Regiment.
- Temporary Captain (now Acting Major) Percy Richard Hubbard, Royal Field Artillery.
- Temporary Captain William Rawson Hughes, Army Service Corps.
- 2nd Lieutenant (temporary Lieutenant) Sydney Francis Morten Humbert, Royal Engineers.
- 2nd Lieutenant (acting Captain) Alexander Hunter, Royal Highlanders.
- Temporary Captain John Thomas Hurst, MB, Royal Army Medical Corps.
- Temporary Lieutenant Cecil Newman Hutchons, Royal Engineers.
- 2nd Lieutenant (temporary Captain) Thomas Leonard Ibbs, Monmouthshire Regiment.
- Temporary Captain (now Acting Major) Howard Seymour Illingworth, Army Service Corps.
- 2nd Lieutenant (acting Captain) Herbert John Impson, Norfolk Regiment.
- Lieutenant (acting Captain) Ernest Allison Iredale, Border Regiment.
- Captain Laurence Heber Warneford Iredale, MB, Royal Army Medical Corps, Special Reserve.
- Temporary Sub-Lieutenant Michael Isaacs, RNVR.
- Captain Colin de Stuteville Isaacson, East Africa Protectorate Forces.
- 2nd Lieutenant (temporary Lieutenant) Cyril Bramwell Armytage Jackson, Yeomanry.
- Captain Robert Rames Jackson, Royal Field Artillery, Special Reserve.
- Temporary Capt Peter Ratcliffe Jacobs, Northumberland Fusiliers.
- Captain Christopher Russell James, Bedfordshire Regiment.
- Company Sergeant Major William Jamieson, Machine Gun Corps.
- Temporary Captain Darsie Napier Japp, Royal Field Artillery.
- Lieutenant Maurice Malcolm Jeakes, Royal Engineers.
- Bimbashi (Major) Wilfred Edgar Jennings Bramly, Egyptian Coastguard Administration.
- 2nd Lieutenant (acting Captain) Norman Lees Jennison, General List (formerly Manchester Regiment).
- Temporary Lieutenant (temporary Captain) Harold Drewett Jensen, General List and Royal Flying Corps.
- Captain James Arthur Jervois. Yorkshire Light Infantry.
- Temporary Captain Charles Edgar Jewels, Lancashire Fusiliers.
- Temporary 2nd Lieutenant Alfred Johnson, North Staffordshire Regiment.
- 2nd Lieutenant (acting Captain) Oscar Johnson, Cheshire Regiment.
- Temporary 2nd Lieutenant David Percy Hope Johnstone, General List.
- Temporary 2nd Lieutenant (acting Captain) Percy Jolliffe, Royal Irish Fusiliers.
- Temporary Captain Albert Jones, MD, Royal Army Medical Corps.
- Lieutenant Herbert Oliver Jones, East African Pioneer Company.
- Captain Hugh Gerald Jones, Rhodesian Police.
- Reverend John Cethin Jones, Temporary Chaplain to the Forces, 4th Class, Army Chaplains' Department.
- 2nd Lieutenant (temporary Captain) Richard Jones, Manchester Regiment.
- Lieutenant Arthur Wellesley Julian, Royal Dublin Fusiliers, Special Reserve.
- 31743 Sergeant Major Arnold Kaufman, Royal Army Medical Corps.
- Temporary Lieutenant (acting Captain) Philip Henry Keeling, Royal Engineers (2nd Lieutenant, Royal Engineers, Territorial Force), attached Signal Company.
- Captain Hugo Nicholson James Keene, Royal Garrison Artillery.
- Temporary Captain Daniel Kelly, Royal Army Medical Corps.
- Temporary Lieutenant David Victor Kelly, Leicestershire Regiment.
- 2nd Lieutenant Richard Barrett Talbot Kelly, Royal Field Artillery.
- 2nd Lieutenant Ernest George Kemp. Rifle Brigade.
- Temporary Lieutenant Alexander Melville Kennedy, Royal Scots Fusiliers.
- Temporary Captain Harry Brew Kennedy, Army Service Corps.
- 3578 Company Sergeant Major Michael Kennedy, Irish Guards.
- Lieutenant (temporary Captain) Sydney Vincent Kennedy, Hussars.
- 2nd Lieutenant Harold Frederick Kent, Honourable Artillery Company.
- Captain Harold Edward Kentish, Royal Engineers.
- Captain Charles Kerr, Reserve of Officers, late Royal Horse Guards.
- 2nd Lieutenant Frederick Kerr, Argyll and Sutherland Highlanders.
- Temporary Lieutenant (acting Captain) Cleveland Keyes, Royal Field Artillery.
- Captain William Elworthy Kidner, Royal Engineers.
- Captain Douglas Reid King, MB, Royal Army Medical Corps, Special Reserve.
- 2nd Lieutenant Ebenezer King, King's Own Scottish Borderers, Special Reserve, attached Royal Flying Corps.
- Captain Francis Lambourne King, Liverpool Regiment, Special Reserve.
- Temporary 2nd Lieutenant Humphrey Stuart King, Northumberland Fusiliers.
- Reverend Michael King, Temporary Chaplain to the Forces, 4th Class, Army Chaplains' Department.
- Quartermaster and Hon. Captain David Kinlay, Scots Guards.
- Reverend James Kirk, Temporary Chaplain to the Forces, 4th Class, Army Chaplains' Department.
- 2nd Lieutenant (acting Captain) Aidan Kirkley, Durham Light Infantry.
- Temporary Captain Ronald Claude Yvonne Kirkpatrick, Royal Engineers.
- 2nd Lieutenant Cecil Orrin Kitchener, Royal Field Artillery, Special Reserve.
- Captain the Hon. Ronald Dudley Kitson, West Yorkshire Regiment.
- Temporary Lieutenant (acting Captain) Arnold Stuart Lambert, Royal Engineers.
- Lieutenant (temporary Captain) Eric Noel Lambert, Yorkshire Regiment, Special Reserve.
- 2nd Lieutenant (temporary Captain) Philip Aislabie Landon, Essex Regiment.
- Captain Roger Palmer Landon, Royal Garrison Artillery.
- 2nd Lieutenant (temporary Captain) Arthur Henry Jackson Lane, Welsh Regiment.
- Temporary Lieutenant William Aubrey Lane, Army Service Corps.
- Captain Algernon Philip York Langhorne, DSO, Royal Garrison Artillery.
- Quartermaster and Hon. Lieutenant Walter Langrish, Scottish Rifles.
- 2nd Lieutenant (acting Lieutenant) Leonard Erskine Lanham. Royal Field Artillery, Special Reserve.
- Temporary Lieutenant Arthur Whitley Lavarack, Royal Fusiliers.
- Lieutenant (acting Captain) Hugh Francis d'Assisi Stuart Law, Irish Guards.
- 2nd Lieutenant George Marcus Lawrence, Yeomanry.
- Temporary 2nd Lieutenant John Davies Lawrence, Machine Gun Corps.
- Temporary Lieutenant Harry Lawson-Jones, Welsh Regiment.
- Temporary Lieutenant Claude Guy Leatham, King's Royal Rifle Corps.
- Temporary 2nd Lieutenant (temporary Captain) Albert George Lee, Royal Engineers.
- Temporary Lieutenant Anthony Langlois Bruce Lefroy, Army Service Corps.
- Temporary Captain Henry Verdon Leonard, Cheshire Regiment (attached), formerly East Lancashire Regiment.
- Temporary Captain Herbert Christie Lepper, Army Service Corps.
- Temporary Lieutenant Henry Norman Letherby, Royal Engineers.
- Captain Reginald Letters, Cameron Highlanders.
- Captain Hugh Liddell, Northumberland Fusiliers.
- Temporary Captain Samuel Frederick Lilley, Nottinghamshire and Derbyshire Regiment.
- Quartermaster and Hon. Lieutenant William Thomas Lindop, London Regiment.
- Temporary Captain Albert Edward Lindsay, Army Service Corps.
- 2nd Lieutenant Alfred Stewart Lindsay, Royal Highlanders.
- Captain Henry Linton, MVO, Shropshire Light Infantry, Special Reserve.
- Temporary Lieutenant (acting Captain) Archibald MacDonald Livingstone, Royal Field Artillery.
- 2nd Lieutenant (temporary Lieutenant) Conrad Bertie Lochner, South Wales Borderers.
- Quartermaster and Honorary Lieutenant Alfred Herbert John Lock, Royal Welsh Fusiliers (Temporary Captain, Bedfordshire Regiment).
- Temporary 2nd Lieutenant John Hastie Logan, Royal Scots.
- Temporary Captain Frederick Edward Long, Liverpool Regiment.
- Temporary Captain George Norman Lorimer, MB, Royal Army Medical Corps.
- Temporary Captain Sydney Henry Lowry, Hertfordshire Regiment.
- Temporary Captain John Bell Lowthian, Border Regiment.
- Temporary 2nd Lieutenant Humphrey William Herbert Lucas, General List, attached Middlesex Regiment.
- Lieutenant (acting Captain) Harry Basil Lumsden, Royal Scots, Special Reserve.
- Temporary Captain Robert Lumsden, Gordon Highlanders.
- Lieutenant (temporary Captain) Arthur Michael Lupton, Royal Field Artillery.
- Temporary Captain David Collier Lyell, Border Regiment.
- Lieutenant Alan David Macdonald, Lancashire Fusiliers.
- Temporary Lieutenant (acting Captain) Edgar Macdonald, Royal Field Artillery.
- Captain Harry Erskine Macfarlane, Hussars.
- Captain Angus Alexander Macfarlane-Grieve, Highland Light Infantry, Special Reserve.
- 2nd Lieutenant John Murray Mackay, Royal Garrison Artillery.
- Lieutenant (acting Captain) James Oliphant Mackellar, Argyll and Sutherland Highlanders.
- Lieutenant (temporary Captain) William Macken, Royal Field Artillery.
- Lieutenant David Mackenzie, Gordon Highlanders.
- Temporary Captain John Tolmie MacKenzie, Royal Army Medical Corps.
- 2nd Lieutenant (temporary Captain) Kenneth Norman Mackenzie, Yeomanry.
- Temporary Lieutenant (acting Captain) Robert Wallace Mackinlay (Lieutenant, Royal Engineers, Territorial Force), attached Signal Company.
- 2nd Lieutenant James McLellan, Royal Engineers.
- Lieutenant (acting Captain) Norman Donald MacLeod, Royal Highlanders.
- Temporary 2nd Lieutenant (temporary Lieutenant) Robert Macleod, General List, formerly Seaforth Highlanders.
- Captain Roderick Macleod, Royal Artillery.
- 2nd Lieutenant Alan James Macnab, Argyll and Sutherland Highlanders, Special Reserve.
- Quartermaster and Honorary Lieutenant Robert Cumming Thomson Mair, Seaforth Highlanders.
- Captain Charles Harwood Manger, South Staffordshire Regiment.
- Temporary Lieutenant Arthur Rivington Mangnall, Royal Engineers.
- Captain (Local) Arthur Pitcher Manning, Independent Telegraph Company.
- 2nd Lieutenant (temporary Captain) Edward John Stanley Maples, Lincolnshire Regiment.
- 13786 Company Sergeant Major Arthur Marcer, Yorkshire Light Infantry.
- 2nd Lieutenant Maximilian John Jules Gabriel Mare-Montembault, Yeomanry and Royal Flying Corps.
- 12393 Company Sergeant Major Thomas Markey, South Lancashire Regiment.
- Temporary 2nd Lieutenant Horace Frost Marris, Royal Engineers.
- Temporary Captain Charles Bennett Marshall, Royal Field Artillery.
- Lieutenant (acting Captain) Ernest William Marshall, Somerset Light Infantry, Special Reserve.
- Temporary Captain John Scott Marshall, Royal Engineers, formerly Royal Marines.
- Lieutenant (temporary Captain) Kenneth Marshall, East Surrey Regiment, Special Reserve.
- Temporary 2nd Lieutenant (acting Captain) Leslie William Martinnant, Rifle Brigade.
- 2nd Lieutenant Henry Claude Mason, East Surrey Regiment, Special Reserve.
- Temporary Lieutenant (acting Captain) Kenneth Sydney Mason, Machine Gun Corps.
- 2nd Lieutenant (temporary Captain) Herbert Martin Massey, Nottinghamshire and Derbyshire Regiment and Royal Flying Corps.
- Captain Alexander Charles Masters, South Wales Borderers.
- Captain Stanley Mathews, Duke of Cornwall's Light Infantry.
- Lieutenant Colin Matson, Royal Dublin Fusiliers.
- Temporary Captain Horace Lionel Matthews, Royal Dublin Fusiliers.
- 2nd Lieutenant (acting Lieutenant) James Maxwell, Royal Irish Rifles.
- Temporary Lieutenant George Maycock, Royal Sussex Regiment.
- Quartermaster and Honorary Captain George Henry Mayhew. Honourable Artillery Company.
- Temporary Lieutenant Jasper Frederick Mayne, Royal Field Artillery.
- Temporary Lieutenant Angus McCallum, East Kent Regiment, formerly Army Service Corps.
- 2nd Lieutenant Adam Edward Cliff McCulloch, South Lancashire Regiment.
- 2nd Lieutenant Albert Victor McDonald, Royal West Kent Regiment.
- Lieutenant (temporary Captain) Cecil Thomas Jeffries McDowell, Royal Field Artillery.
- Temporary Captain Henry McLaren, Royal Engineers (Lieutenant, Northern Signal Company, Royal Engineers).
- Lieutenant Seymour Bruce McMaster, Royal Irish Fusiliers, Special Reserve.
- Temporary Captain Henry Meintjes, General List and Royal Flying Corps.
- Temporary Captain James Gerald Guy Mellor, Special List.
- Lieutenant (temporary Captain) John Leslie Mellor, Royal Warwickshire Regiment.
- Temporary 2nd Lieutenant (temporary Captain) David Leslie Melville, General List.
- Captain George David Melville, Welsh Regiment.
- Captain John Clifford Metcalfe, MB, Royal Army Medical Corps.
- 2nd Lieutenant Richard Douglas Miles, Royal Irish Fusiliers, Special Reserve.
- 2nd Lieutenant (temporary Captain) Audley Charles Hyde Millar, Yorkshire Regiment, Special Reserve.
- Lieutenant (now Acting Major) John Leonard Miller, Royal Engineers.
- Temporary Lieutenant William Miles Miller, Royal Engineers (Captain, Canadian Infantry).
- Temporary Captain Henry Joseph Milligan, MD, Royal Army Medical Corps.
- Temporary Lieutenant (temporary Captain) Alfred Frank Mills, General List, formerly Devonshire Regiment.
- Temporary Quartermaster and Honorary Lieutenant William Smith Minchin, Royal Fusiliers.
- Captain James Robertson Mitchell, MB, Royal Army Medical Corps.
- Temporary 2nd Lieutenant William Eric Marcus Mitchell, Royal Irish Rifles.
- Captain William McGregor Mitchell, Army Veterinary Corps.
- Captain William Nassan Molesworth, Manchester Regiment.
- Lieutenant (temporary Captain) Henry Tobin Moll, Leinster Regiment, Special Reserve.
- 2nd Lieutenant Andrew Mitchell Montgomery, Yeomanry.
- Temporary Lieutenant (acting Captain) Frederick William Moore, Royal Engineers.
- Temporary Captain Francis William Moore, Devonshire Regiment.
- Temporary Captain Henry Moore, Royal Army Medical Corps.
- Temporary Lieutenant (temporary Captain) Kenneth Montgomery Moore. General List.
- Temporary 2nd Lieutenant (acting Captain) Robert Frank Moore, Nottinghamshire and Derbyshire Regiment.
- 2nd Lieutenant (acting Captain) Edgar Moreton, Royal Field Artillery, Special Reserve.
- 2nd Lieutenant David Phillips Morgan, Royal Field Artillery.
- Temporary Lieutenant (acting Captain) William Forsyth Morgan, Royal Garrison Artillery.
- Sub-Conductor (acting Conductor) Frederick George Morley, Advanced Ordnance Depot.
- 2nd Lieutenant (temporary Captain) Herbert Harold Morrell, York and Lancaster Regiment.
- Temporary 2nd Lieutenant (acting Captain) John Rowland Morris, General List.
- Lieutenant Robert Parry Morris, Royal Garrison Artillery.
- Lieutenant Martin James Morrison, Durham Light Infantry.
- Captain Reginald Seymour Moss-Blundell, Indian Army.
- 2nd Lieutenant (now Acting Major) George Moulder, Gloucestershire Regiment.
- 200067 Company Sergeant Major Wilfred Lawrence Moule, Worcestershire Regiment.
- Temporary Captain Morris Carswell Muir, Cameron Highlanders.
- Temporary 2nd Lieutenant Harry Salmon Muir, Royal Highlanders.
- 2nd Lieutenant (temporary Lieutenant) Anthony John Muirhead, Yeomanry.
- 2nd Lieutenant (temporary Lieutenant) Cecil Francis Mullin, Royal Artillery.
- Reverend Donald Wynch Murray, Temporary Chaplain to the Forces, 4th Class, Army Chaplains' Department.
- Captain Louis Gerald Murray, Gordon Highlanders.
- Temporary 2nd Lieutenant (temporary Captain) Patrick Sampson Murray, General List.
- Lieutenant Duncan Innes Murray-Menzies, Royal Highlanders.
- Lieutenant Ernest Myatt, Royal Lancaster Regiment.
- 5375 Regimental Sergeant Major William Myers, Northumberland Fusiliers.
- 2nd Lieutenant Edward George Paul Nathan, Royal Field Artillery.
- 2nd Lieutenant (temporary Lieutenant) Frank Charles Gordon Naumann, Royal Horse Artillery.
- Temporary Lieutenant Cyril Francis Naylor, Army Service Corps.
- Temporary Lieutenant (temporary Captain) Maurice Richard Neale, Advanced Ordnance Depot.
- Lieutenant (acting Captain) William Warwick Slade Crampton Neville, Grenadier Guards, Special Reserve.
- Lieutenant (acting Captain) Thomas Grindall Newbury, Lincolnshire Regiment.
- Captain Richard Ernest Upton Newman, MB, Royal Army Medical Corps.
- Lieutenant Robert Saunders Newton, Lancashire Fusiliers.
- Temporary Lieutenant Tressilian Charles Nicholas, General List.
- Temporary Captain Sidney Kenneth Nichols, General List, late Yorkshire Regiment.
- Temporary Lieutenant Bertie Halcro Nicholson, RNVR.
- Temporary 2nd Lieutenant (temporary Captain) Ernest Beck Nicholson, Royal Scots.
- Temporary Lieutenant Edward Chambers Nicholson, Royal Berkshire Regiment.
- Captain Geoffrey Nicholson, Hampshire Regiment.
- 2nd Lieutenant (temporary Captain) Randolph Nicholson, Royal Artillery.
- Temporary Captain Douglas John Nicol, Highland Light Infantry.
- Temporary Lieutenant (temporary Captain) Percy Gordon Norman, Royal Engineers.
- Temporary Captain Frank Kendall Norman, Army Service Corps.
- Lieutenant Percy Gordon Norman, Royal Engineers.
- 2nd Lieutenant (acting Captain) Godfrey Oswald Norton, Liverpool Regiment.
- Temporary Lieutenant (temporary Captain) Leslie Alan Notcutt, Royal Garrison Artillery.
- Temporary Lieutenant Gordon Wright Nowell-Usticke, Royal Field Artillery.
- Temporary Lieutenant (acting Captain) Robert Edwin Oakley, Bedfordshire Regiment.
- Lieutenant (temporary Captain) Henry William O'Brien, Honourable Artillery Company.
- Reverend Peter O'Farrell, Temporary Chaplain to the Forces, 4th Class, Army Chaplains' Department.
- Temporary Captain Edgar Francis Orford, South Wales Borderers.
- 2nd Lieutenant (temporary Captain) William Ormrod, Lancashire Fusiliers.
- Temporary Lieutenant Gordon Biddulph Orr, Royal Garrison Artillery.
- 2nd Lieutenant (acting Captain) James Orrell, Royal Field Artillery.
- Temporary Captain George Owen, Army Service Corps.
- Temporary Captain John Corbett Owen, South Wales Borderers.
- Temporary Captain Cecil Grantham Page, Border Regiment.
- Temporary Captain Edmund Page, King's Royal Rifle Corps.
- Temporary 2nd Lieutenant James Chrichton Pain, Devonshire Regiment.
- Temporary Captain Sydney Arthur Palk, Lancashire Fusiliers.
- Captain Herbert Estill Eyre Pankhurst, Dragoon Guards.
- Captain Archibald Charles Melvill Paris, Oxfordshire and Buckinghamshire Light Infantry.
- Temporary Captain Reginald Frank Parker, Manchester Regiment.
- 2nd Lieutenant (temporary Captain) Theodore Henry George Parker, Royal Engineers, Special Reserve.
- Temporary Lieutenant Hugh Parkes, Royal Engineers.
- 2nd Lieutenant Thomas Gerrard Parkes, Worcestershire Regiment.
- Reverend Ellis Foster Edge Partington, Temporary Chaplain to the Forces, 4th Class, Army Chaplains' Department.
- Temporary 2nd Lieutenant Paul Mervyn Pascall, Middlesex Regiment.
- 2nd Lieutenant (temporary Lieutenant) Basil Conquest Pascoe, Rifle Brigade.
- Captain Matthew Wallace Paterson, Royal Army Medical Corps, Special Reserve.
- Reverend James Gilbert Paton, Temporary Chaplain to the Forces, 4th Class, Army Chaplains' Department.
- 2nd Lieutenant (temporary Captain) Egerton Payne, Liverpool Regiment.
- 2nd Lieutenant Walter Josiah Pearse, Royal Horse Artillery.
- 2nd Lieutenant (temporary Lieutenant) Noel Murray Pearson, Yeomanry.
- Temporary Captain Geoffrey Peirson, General List.
- Temporary Lieutenant Guy Edward Pelham-Clinton, Royal Engineers.
- 2nd Lieutenant (temporary Captain) Christopher Pepys, Devonshire Regiment.
- Captain Geoffrey James Francis Percival, Royal Welsh Fusiliers.
- Lieutenant (temporary Captain) Aeneas Francis Quinton Perkins, Royal Engineers.
- Temporary Lieutenant Cecil Ernest Philcox, South Staffordshire Regiment.
- Temporary 2ud Lieutenant Clarence Arnold Phillips, Royal Field Artillery.
- Temporary Captain Leonard Norman Phillips, West Riding Regiment.
- Captain (now acting Major) Charles Constantine Phipps, Royal Engineers.
- Captain Harold Ernest Pickering, West Yorkshire Regiment.
- 2nd Lieutenant (now acting Major) Patrick John Tottenham Pickthall, Royal Artillery.
- Temporary Lieutenant Julian Ito Piggott, General List.
- Lieutenant Thomas Beattie Carline Piggott, Lancashire Fusiliers, Special Reserve.
- Temporary 2nd Lieutenant James Norris Herbert Pimm, Royal Field Artillery.
- Temporary Captain Joseph Pitts, Special List.
- Temporary Lieutenant Leonard Arthur Walter Pitts, Army Service Corps.
- Temporary Captain Arthur Starkie Plant, Royal Army Medical Corps.
- Temporary Captain Matthew George Platts (Lieutenant, Royal Engineers, Special Reserve).
- Captain John Chicheley Plowden, Shropshire Light Infantry.
- Captain Harold Pochin, South Staffordshire Regiment.
- Lieutenant (temporary Captain) Hassard Hume Pollock, Royal Field Artillery.
- Lieutenant (acting Captain) Decimus Pope, Hussars, attached Royal Engineers Signal Service.
- Temporary Captain Richard Ewhurst Porter, Army Service Corps.
- 2nd Lieutenant (acting Captain) Charles Powell, AMIEE, Royal Engineers.
- Lieutenant Frank Hugh Swanwick Pownall, Royal Artillery.
- Temporary 2nd Lieutenant Robert William Preston, Gordon Highlanders.
- Quartermaster and Honorary Captain Frederick Thomas Prichard, Coldstream Guards.
- 2nd Lieutenant (acting Captain) Harry Pride, Middlesex Regiment.
- Temporary Captain Ralph Broomfield Pritchard, Northumberland Fusiliers.
- Temporary Captain Robert Arthur Welsford Proctor, Royal Army Medical Corps.
- 5379 Sergeant Major Arthur Pugh, Royal Scots.
- Temporary Captain Alec Walter Puttick, Royal West Kent Regiment.
- Temporary Lieutenant Winthrop Pyemont, Royal Engineers, Special Reserve.
- Temporary Captain Herbert Alfred Braine Quare, General List.
- Captain Joseph Patrick Quinn, MB, Royal Army Medical Corps, Special Reserve.
- 2nd Lieutenant (acting Captain) John Cairns Rae, Royal Field Artillery.
- Temporary 2nd Lieutenant (acting Lieutenant) John Arthur Raine, Royal Field Artillery.
- 2nd Lieutenant (temporary Lieutenant) Robert Rainie, Royal Scots Fusiliers.
- Lieutenant (acting Captain) Henry Montgomerie Ramsay Fairfax-Lucy, Rifle Brigade.
- Lieutenant (acting Captain) Martin Ravenscroft, Royal Field Artillery.
- Temporary 2nd Lieutenant (acting Captain) Stanley Read, Middlesex Regiment.
- 2nd Lieutenant (temporary Lieutenant) Herbert Redden, East Lancashire Regiment.
- Temporary Captain Arthur Edward Redfern, General List.
- Reverend Timothy Rees, Temporary Chaplain to the Forces, 4th Class, Army Chaplains' Department.
- Temporary Lieutenant (acting Captain) William Hayden Rees, Royal Engineers.
- Temporary 2nd Lieutenant Harry Conway Redgrave, Royal Engineers.
- Temporary Captain Ernest William Reeve, East Yorkshire Regiment.
- Temporary 2nd Lieutenant Robert Alexander Rendall, Duke of Cornwall's Light Infantry.
- Temporary Lieutenant William Herbert Reynolds, General List.
- Temporary Captain William Kenneth Armstrong Richards, Royal Army Medical Corps.
- Temporary Captain Adolphus Noah Richardson, Machine Gun Corps.
- 2nd Lieutenant (acting Captain) Percy Harold Richardson, Royal Field Artillery, Special Reserve.
- Temporary Captain George Lawton Ridout, Royal Engineers.
- Temporary Lieutenant (acting Captain) George William Frederick Ridout-Evans, Royal Engineers.
- Temporary Lieutenant Charles Gordon Ritchie, Highland Light Infantry.
- 2nd Lieutenant John Roake, Lancashire Fusiliers.
- Temporary 2nd Lieutenant William Reginald Roberson, Army Service Corps.
- 2nd Lieutenant Vivian Godwin Robert, Indian Army Reserve of Officers.
- Temporary Captain Donald Edward Roberts, Yorkshire Light Infantry.
- 2nd Lieutenant (temporary Lieutenant) Enos Herbert Glynne Roberts, Liverpool Regiment.
- Quartermaster and Honorary Lieutenant Frank Maurice Roberts, Oxfordshire and Buckinghamshire Light Infantry.
- 2nd Lieutenant (temporary Lieutenant) George Goodden Roberts, Royal Engineers.
- 2nd Lieutenant (acting Captain) Harry Roberts, Royal Sussex Regiment.
- Temporary Captain Harold Charles Went Roberts, Middlesex Regiment.
- Captain Horace George Victor Roberts, Middlesex Regiment.
- Temporary Lieutenant (temporary Captain) Colin John Trevelyan Robertson, Advanced Ordnance Depot.
- Temporary Captain Duncan Robertson, Lancashire Fusiliers.
- Temporary 2nd Lieutenant Frank Leslie Robertson, General List.
- Temporary Captain (now Temporary Major) Malcolm Robertson, General List, formerly West Riding Regiment.
- Quartermaster and Hon. Captain Albert Robinson, King's Royal Rifle Corps.
- Captain Alfred Conrad Robinson, South Lancashire Regiment.
- Temporary 2nd Lieutenant John Scott Robinson, East Lancashire Regiment.
- Temporary 2nd Lieutenant Norman Vaughan Robinson, East Surrey Regiment.
- Bde. Captain Alexander James Rodger, Royal Scots Fusiliers.
- 2nd Lieutenant (acting Captain) Ernest Arthur Wingrove Rogers, Royal Horse Artillery, Special Reserve.
- Quartermaster and Hon. Lieutenant Thomas Ross, Scots Guards.
- Temporary Captain George Francis Rothschild, Royal Sussex Regiment.
- Temporary 2nd Lieutenant William George Round, Worcestershire Regiment.
- 2nd Lieutenant (temporary Captain) Brian Walton Rowe, Cambridgeshire Regiment.
- 2nd Lieutenant John Wilkinson Foster Rowe, Royal West Kent Regiment, Special Reserve.
- Temporary Lieutenant Stafford Basil Ritchie Rudkin, Royal Field Artillery.
- Lieutenant (acting Captain) Gerald Cyril Russell, Royal Field Artillery, Special Reserve.
- Quartermaster and Honorary Lieutenant John Hayne Russell, Welsh Regiment.
- Reverend Ernest Perkins St. John, Temporary Chaplain to the Forces, 4th Class, Army Chaplains' Department.
- Temporary Captain Geoffrey Robert St. John, Royal Fusiliers.
- Temporary Captain Ian Cuthbertson Sanderson, Royal Highlanders.
- Temporary Captain Harry Sargent, Lincolnshire Regiment.
- Temporary Captain Basil Ashby Saunders, West Yorkshire Regiment.
- Captain Cornelius James Saunders, London Regiment.
- Temporary Lieutenant Franklin Geoffrey Saunders, General List and Royal Flying Corps.
- 2nd Lieutenant (temporary Lieutenant) Louis Christian Schiller, Lincolnshire Regiment.
- Temporary 2nd Lieutenant (acting Captain) Hubert Scholes, Royal Engineers.
- Captain David Jobson Scott, Royal Army Medical Corps.
- Temporary Captain Austin Edward Scott-Murray, General List.
- Temporary Captain Alec Graham Scougal, Royal Scots.
- Temporary Lieutenant (temporary Captain) Guy Walsh Blackburn Scratton, Indian Army.
- Captain Charles Frederick Searle, MB, Royal Army Medical Corps.
- Temporary Quartermaster and Honorary Lieutenant George Searle, Royal Inniskilling Fusiliers.
- Temporary Captain William Sebag-Montefiore, General List.
- Captain Henry Norton Seed, East Yorkshire Regiment.
- Temporary Lieutenant Eric Francis Sellars, Cheshire Regiment.
- 2nd Lieutenant Frederick Hatherley Bruce Selous, Royal West Surrey Regiment and Royal Flying Corps.
- Temporary Lieutenant Donald Farquharson Seth-Smith, King's African Rifles.
- Temporary Captain Albert Davis Sharp, MD, Royal Army Medical Corps.
- Temporary Lieutenant Alfred Shaw, Middlesex Regiment.
- Quartermaster and Honorary Lieutenant John Shaw, East Lancashire Regiment.
- Temporary Captain James Dykes Shearer, Royal Lancaster Regiment.
- 2nd Lieutenant John James Sheppard, London Regiment.
- Lieutenant Harry Purvis Sherwood, Royal Warwickshire Regiment.
- 2nd Lieutenant Eric Ashley Shipton, Royal Field Artillery.
- Temporary Lieutenant (acting Captain) Stanley Howard Shoveller, Rifle Brigade.
- Temporary Lieutenant Charles Hope Sleigh, Special List.
- 2nd Lieutenant (temporary Captain) Henry Slingsby, Yeomanry.
- Lieutenant Henry Laurence Slingsby, Yorkshire Light Infantry.
- Temporary Lieutenant George Somerville Smail, Seaforth Highlanders.
- Lieutenant (temporary Captain) Arthur Russell Smith, Army Service Corps.
- Lieutenant (temporary Captain) Alfred Travers Fairtlough Smith, Army Service Corps.
- Temporary 2nd Lieutenant John Adams Smith, Northumberland Fusiliers.
- 2nd Lieutenant (temporary Lieutenant) Leonard John Smith, Royal Engineers.
- Temporary Lieutenant (acting Captain) William Smyth, Royal Engineers.
- Temporary Lieutenant Sydney Snell, Royal Engineers.
- 2nd Lieutenant Robert Thomas Stuart Sneyd, Indian Army. Reserve of Officers.
- Temporary Captain Ronald Augustin Sommerville, Somerset Light Infantry.
- 1106 Company Sergeant Major (acting Regimental Sergeant Major) Thomas Sordy, Durham Light Infantry.
- Lieutenant (acting Captain) Sebastian Sorrell, Manchester Regiment, Special Reserve.
- Temporary Captain Archibald Graham Spark, Yorkshire Light Infantry.
- Temporary 2nd Lieutenant Samuel Sparrow, Territorial Reserve, attached Manchester Regiment.
- 300 Company Sergeant Major Frank Speller, Machine Gun Guards.
- 2nd Lieutenant Leslie John Spencer, Royal Engineers.
- Lieutenant (now Temporary Major) Claude Meyer Spielman, Royal Engineers, Special Reserve.
- Lieutenant (acting Captain) Miles Staveley, Royal Horse Artillery.
- Temporary Captain Edward John Stead, Royal Engineers.
- Temporary 2nd Lieutenant (temporary Captain) Geoffrey Henry Stead, General List.
- 2nd Lieutenant (temporary Captain) Eric Steele, Manchester Regiment.
- Temporary Captain Frederick William Stephen, Royal Engineers.
- Lieutenant Charles Robert Stephens, Royal Engineers.
- 2nd Lieutenant (acting Lieutenant) Frank Percival Stephens, South Staffordshire Regiment, Special Reserve.
- 2nd Lieutenant (acting Captain) Christopher Stephenson, Northumberland Fusiliers.
- Captain Harold Stephenson, Army Veterinary Corps.
- Captain Alexander John Stephenson-Fetherstonhaugh, Worcestershire Regiment.
- Lieutenant Herbert Frank Stevens, East Kent Regiment.
- Temporary Inspector of Ordnance Machinery, 2nd Class and Temporary Honorary Captain Robert Stevenson, Army Ordnance Department.
- Temporary Captain Charles Edward Stewart, Durham Light Infantry.
- Captain Robert Montagu Stewart-Richardson, Hussars.
- Temporary Lieutenant (temporary Captain) Eustace Dupuis Henchman Stocker, Liverpool Regiment.
- Lieutenant (acting Captain) Vere Gordon Stokes, Royal Berkshire Regiment.
- Captain Montagu George North Stopford, Rifle Brigade.
- 2nd Lieutenant (temporary Lieutenant) John Stratton Storrar, Royal Field Artillery.
- Surgeon Captain Eric Gleason Storrs, Rhodesian Medical Service.
- Temporary Lieutenant (temporary Captain) Leonard Arthur Watson Stower, Army Ordnance Department.
- Temporary Lieutenant Reginald Edward Stradling, Royal Engineers.
- 938 Sergeant Major Albert Strickland, Royal Fusiliers.
- Reverend John L. Stuart, DD, Temporary Chaplain to the Forces, 4th Class, Army Chaplains' Department.
- Temporary Captain Harold Saunderson Sugars, MB, Royal Army Medical Corps.
- Temporary 2nd Lieutenant Douglas Victor Sutherst, Royal West Kent Regiment.
- Temporary Captain Eric Montagu Tabor, Royal Engineers.
- Captain Douglas Hervey Talbot, Lancers.
- 2nd Lieutenant (acting Captain) Leonard Lane Talbot, Royal Field Artillery, Special Reserve.
- 2nd Lieutenant Guy Richard Tamplin, Royal Garrison Artillery.
- Quartermaster and Honorary Lieutenant Alfred William Taylor, West Yorkshire Regiment.
- Temporary Lieutenant Godfrey Midgley Chassereau Taylor, Royal Engineers (late Royal Marine Light Infantry).
- Temporary Captain James Harry Taylor, FRCVS, Army Veterinary Corps.
- 2nd Lieutenant (temporary Lieutenant) John Henry Taylor, Army Service Corps.
- Lieutenant (temporary Captain) John Teague, Royal Warwickshire Regiment.
- Quartermaster and Honorary Lieutenant Jabez Teece, Grenadier Guards.
- Captain Oskar Teichmann, Royal Army Medical Corps.
- 2nd Lieutenant James Tennant, Cameron Highlanders.
- 2nd Lieutenant (temporary Captain) Eric William Tetley, South Lancashire Regiment.
- Temporary Captain John Walter Francis Thelwall, General List.
- 2nd Lieutenant Robert Alexander Hastings Thomas, Army Service Corps.
- Lieutenant (temporary Captain) Arnold John Thompson, Scots Guards, Special Reserve.
- Temporary Lieutenant (acting Captain) Geoffrey Barry Poole Thompson, Royal Engineers.
- Captain Arthur Yalden Graham Thomson, Cameron Highlanders.
- Temporary Lieutenant (temporary Captain) Spencer Thomson, Royal Fusiliers.
- Temporary Captain Walter Edward Thornhill, Royal Engineers.
- Temporary Captain Thomas Percy Thyne, Hampshire Regiment.
- Captain Wilberforce Onslow Times, Hertfordshire Regiment.
- 2nd Lieutenant William Tolchard, Royal Garrison Artillery.
- Lieutenant (temporary Captain) William Tong, North Lancashire Regiment.
- 2nd Lieutenant (temporary Captain) Thomas Harry Tooze, Worcestershire Regiment.
- Lieutenant (acting Captain) John Colin Pell Tosh, Royal Engineers.
- Captain Lionel Henry Torin, Shropshire Light Infantry.
- Captain Clarence Henry Southgate Townsend, Army Veterinary Corps.
- Reverend Horace Crawford Townsend, Temporary Chaplain to the Forces, 4th Class, Army Chaplains' Department.
- Temporary 2nd Lieutenant Alfred Tozer, Royal Engineers.
- Temporary Captain John Francis Fellowes Trelawny, Special List.
- Temporary 2nd Lieutenant (temporary Lieutenant) John Daniel Tremlett, Royal Field Artillery.
- Temporary Captain William Langton Trench, West Yorkshire Regiment.
- Temporary 2nd Lieutenant Harris Stephens Triscott, Royal Engineers.
- 2nd Lieutenant John George Troup, Gordon Highlanders.
- Temporary Lieutenant (acting Captain) Henry Charles Tuckfield, General Last.
- Temporary Captain John Taylor Tulloch, Highland Light Infantry.
- Temporary Captain Francis Gordon Turner, General List.
- Captain John Walter Turner, Nottinghamshire and Derbyshire Regiment.
- Temporary Quartermaster and Honorary Lieutenant John Tutt, Royal Engineers.
- Temporary Lieutenant Frank Tanfield Vachell, Royal Field Artillery.
- Captain Ralph Peter Varwell, Royal Irish Rifles.
- Temporary Lieutenant (temporary Captain) John Henry Vernall, Army Ordnance Department.
- Lieutenant Anthony John Vernon, Royal Irish Fusiliers.
- Captain Naunton George Vertue, East Kent Regiment.
- 2nd Lieutenant (acting Captain) John Edgar Villa, Royal Engineers.
- Temporary Captain Alec Waley, Royal Engineers.
- Lieutenant Bertram William George Walker, Indian Army.
- 2798 Company Sergeant Major (acting Regimental Sergeant Major) Frederick Walker, Royal Engineers.
- 2nd Lieutenant (temporary Lieutenant) Gavin Knox Walker, Royal Engineers.
- Temporary Captain Gilbert Kingsley Walker, Royal Engineers.
- Captain Howard Napier Walker, Welsh Regiment.
- Captain Charles Talbot Joseph Gerard Walmsley, Yeomanry.
- Temporary 2nd Lieutenant Leslie Arthur Walton, Welsh Regiment.
- Temporary Captain William Bunting Wamsley, MB, Royal Army Medical Corps.
- 7263 Company Sergeant Major (acting Regimental Quartermaster Sergeant) Francis Wannop, Scottish Rifles.
- 2nd Lieutenant (temporary Captain) Douglas John Ward, Royal Berkshire Regiment.
- Temporary Captain Charles Henry Warner, General List.
- Temporary Quartermaster and Honorary Lieutenant Richard Waterhouse, Manchester Regiment.
- Lieutenant (temporary Captain) Walter Archibald Parker Watson, Royal Warwickshire Regiment.
- Lieutenant (temporary Captain) William Donald Paul Watson, Reserve of Officers, late 2nd Dragoons.
- 265039 (formerly 611) Company Sergeant Major Harry Watts, Oxfordshire and Buckinghamshire Light Infantry.
- Temporary 2nd Lieutenant Fawcitt Wayman, Durham Light Infantry.
- Temporary Lieutenant Alfred Owen Tudor Webb, Royal Engineers.
- Temporary Captain Charles William Vincent Webb, Shropshire Light Infantry.
- Temporary 2nd Lieutenant Robert Weir, Royal Engineers.
- Captain (now Temporary Major) Bertram de Weltden Weldon (retired), General List.
- Temporary Lieutenant Herbert John Wellingham, Royal Field Artillery.
- Temporary 2nd Lieutenant Andrew Wemyss, Royal Scots.
- 2nd Lieutenant (temporary Lieutenant) Jesse West, South Staffordshire Regiment, Special Reserve.
- 6524 Sergeant Major Wilfred Charles Weston, Royal Berkshire Regiment.
- Temporary Lieutenant Alfred Burden Wharton, Royal West Surrey Regiment.
- Temporary Lieutenant Henry Harold Wheatley, Royal Engineers.
- 2nd Lieutenant (acting Captain) James Edgar Walsh Wheatley, Royal Garrison Artillery (Special Reserve).
- Captain Lawder Thomas Whelan, Royal Army Medical Corps.
- Captain Frank Whitaker, East Kent Regiment.
- 2nd Lieutenant (temporary Captain) George White, Northumberland Fusiliers.
- Captain James Lumsden Colvin White, Royal Field Artillery.
- Temporary Lieutenant Robert Whymper, General List.
- 2nd Lieutenant Jocelyn James Wilcox. Somerset Light Infantry.
- 2nd Lieutenant Norman Wild, Royal Garrison Artillery, Special Reserve.
- 2nd Lieutenant Sydney Herbert Wilkes, Worcestershire Regiment.
- Temporary 2nd Lieutenant (temporary Lieutenant) acting Flight Commander Eric Russell Wilkinson, General List, and Royal Flying Corps.
- Temporary Lieutenant (acting Captain) Maurice Hewson Wilkinson, Royal Engineers.
- Quartermaster and Honorary Lieutenant Benjamin Williams, Yorkshire Regiment.
- 2nd Lieutenant George Charles Sandford Williams, Royal Engineers.
- Lieutenant Herbrand Alfred Collman Williams, King's Royal Rifle Corps.
- Temporary 2nd Lieutenant (temporary Lieutenant) Dan Hugh Willis, Royal Warwickshire.
- Regiment Captain Graham Horace Wilmer, Essex Regiment.
- 2nd Lieutenant Ernest George Willmore, Royal Garrison Artillery, Special Reserve.
- Captain (now Temporary Major) Thomas Ernest Wills, Army Service Corps.
- Temporary Lieutenant Alexander Wilson, East Yorkshire Regiment.
- Captain Cyril Spencer Wilson, Royal Engineers.
- Captain Edward Rickard Carew Wilson, Royal Artillery.
- 2nd Lieutenant Henry Arthur Wilson, Royal Field Artillery.
- Captain John St. George Wilson, Royal Army Medical Corps.
- Captain Percival Alexander Wilson, Reserve of Officers, late Royal West Kent Regiment.
- 2nd Lieutenant (temporary Captain) Samuel Brammer Wilton, North Staffordshire Regiment.
- Temporary Captain Charles William Wingrove, Royal Lancaster Regiment.
- 2nd Lieutenant (temporary Lieutenant) Norman Winter, Royal Sussex Regiment.
- Temporary Lieutenant (acting Captain) Thomas Ralph Okeden Winwood, Royal Field Artillery.
- Temporary Lieutenant Evelyn Victor Wood, Machine Gun Corps.
- 2nd Lieutenant (temporary Captain) Harry Alison Wood, Royal Flying Corps, Special Reserve.
- 2nd Lieutenant John Dane Woodall, Royal Garrison Artillery.
- Temporary Captain Coventry William Woodhouse, Intelligence Corps.
- Lieutenant (acting Captain) Laurence Archibald Woodley, Royal Inniskilling Fusiliers, Special Reserve.
- Temporary Captain Arthur Graham Woods, Machine Gun Corps.
- 2nd Lieutenant Ernest Benjamin Woollan, Honourable Artillery Company.
- Lieutenant (temporary Captain) Frederick George Worlock, London Regiment.
- Lieutenant (temporary Captain) Percy Charles Wort, East Kent Regiment.
- 2nd Lieutenant (acting Captain) Arthur James Wright, Northamptonshire Regiment.
- 2nd Lieutenant (temporary Lieutenant) Geoffrey Lowndes Wright, Royal Field Artillery.
- Captain William Girvan Wright, Argyll and Sutherland Highlanders.
- Lieutenant Robert Charles Wynter, Worcestershire Regiment.
- Temporary Lieutenant (temporary Captain) Robert Yates, Royal Engineers.
- Temporary Captain Harold Elvery Yeo, Yorkshire Light Infantry.
- Lieutenant Bernard Keith Young, Royal Engineers.
- Temporary Lieutenant John Allan Young, Royal Field Artillery.
- 2nd Lieutenant (acting Captain) Henry Shedden Baring Young, Royal Garrison Artillery, Special Reserve.

Australian Imperial Force

- Lieutenant Edward Adams, Infantry.
- Captain Hector Ernest Bastin, Infantry.
- Quartermaster and Honorary Lieutenant David Baxter, Infantry.
- Lieutenant Samuel Beddie, Infantry.
- Lieutenant Leslie Coates Bell, Camel Corps, formerly Light Horse Regiment.
- 2nd Lieutenant Thomas Hewitt Boyd, Infantry.
- Lieutenant Roy Brown, Infantry.
- Lieutenant Norman John Browne, Infantry.
- Lieutenant William Buchan, Infantry.
- Lieutenant James Hattill Cartwright, Engineers.
- Lieutenant (temporary Captain) Percy James Cloke, Infantry.
- Lieutenant Andrew Twynam Cunningham, Machine Gun Squadron.
- Captain William Robert Davidson, Infantry.
- 2359 Company Sergeant Major Francis James Doherty, Infantry.
- Captain Geoffrey Drake-Brockman, Engineers.
- Reverend Francis Henry Durnford, Chaplain to the Forces, 4th Class, Army Chaplains' Department.
- Lieutenant Walter Henry East, Artillery.
- Lieutenant Frederic Garnett Farlow, Light Horse Regiment.
- Captain Timothy Bernard Farrell, Infantry.
- Lieutenant (temporary Captain) William Ellis Freeman, Infantry.
- Captain Leslie George Fussell, Infantry.
- Captain Maxwell Gore, Infantry.
- 470 Regimental Sergeant Major George Guthrie, Infantry.
- Captain Thomas Hastie, Infantry.
- Captain Philip Llewellyn Howell-Price, DSO, Infantry.
- Captain Wilfrid Selwyn Kent Hughes, Light Horse Regiment.
- Captain Sydney Arthur Hunn, Infantry.
- Captain Harold Woodford Johnson, Infantry.
- Captain George Edward Knox, Infantry.
- Captain Thomas Stene Louch, Infantry.
- Lieutenant Arthur Henry Lyddall, Pioneer Battalion.
- Captain Walter Paton McCallum, Infantry.
- Captain Frank McLean, Infantry.
- Lieutenant Ernest Henry Whitford Mills, Camel Battalion.
- Captain Albert Mitchell, Machine Gun Corps.
- Captain Hugh William Fancourt Mitchell, Army Medical Corps.
- Lieutenant Henry Herbert Morrell, Infantry.
- Captain Kenneth Basil Muirson, Machine Gun Corps.
- Temporary Captain Roy Dadson Mulvey, Trench Mortar Battery.
- Captain Tom Oswald Nicholls, Machine Gun Corps.
- Captain Reginald Havill Norman, Infantry.
- Captain John Edward Orr, Pioneer Battalion.
- Lieutenant Frank Page, Infantry.
- Captain Percy George Rupert Parkes, Infantry.
- Captain George James Richards, Infantry.
- Captain George Seabourne Robinson, Army Medical Corps.
- Captain William Ross, Cyclist Battalion.
- Lieutenant Leslie Charles Burnett Smith, Infantry.
- Captain Percival Lascelles Smith, Infantry.
- Captain Vernon Earle Smythe, Infantry.
- Captain Henry Morton Tatham, Army Service Corps.
- Lieutenant Robert Harold Thomson, Artillery.
- Captain Joseph Hilton Tuckett, Army Ordnance Corps.
- Captain Charles Trevor Turner, Army Medical Corps.
- Captain Eric Lacey Vowles, Artillery.
- Captain Frederick Lawrence Wall, Army Medical Corps.
- Captain Robert Jonathan Wallis, Infantry.
- Captain Clement Robert Walsh, Army Service Corps.
- Lieutenant Richard Charles Webb, Machine Gun Corps.
- Captain Robert Joseph Webster, Army Service Corps.
- Captain Charles Morrice Williams, Infantry.
- Captain Charles Robert Victor Wright, Camel Battalion.

Canadian Forces

- Captain Allan Anderson Aitken, Infantry.
- Lieutenant Andrew Lusk Anderson, Field Artillery.
- Lieutenant Ronald Arthurs, Infantry.
- Lieutenant (temporary Captain) Harold Othneil Bennett, Artillery.
- Captain David Christie Black, Infantry.
- Captain Frank Morgan Bressey, Infantry.
- Captain Beverly W. Browne, Infantry.
- Captain Harry Tredennick Cock, Royal Canadian Regiment.
- Captain Howard Alfred Lome Conn.
- Lieutenant Roger Christopher Croly, Engineers.
- Captain Alexander Topp Davidson, Field Artillery.
- Lieutenant Henry Thomas Deane, Infantry.
- Lieutenant Henry George Dimsdale, Infantry.
- Lieutenant Harry Dudley-Waters, Engineers.
- Lieutenant Leo Manners Duval, Engineers.
- Lieutenant Edward Phillips Fetherstonhaugh, Engineers.
- Captain William Burton Forster, Infantry.
- Lieutenant Charles Hieland Barnett Garland, Artillery.
- Captain William Stephenson Goodeve, Army Service Corps.
- Lieutenant (acting Captain) John Logan Gray, Mounted Rifles.
- Captain Richard Henry Moore Hardisty, Army Medical Corps.
- Lieutenant Frederick Robert Henshaw, Engineers.
- Honorary Captain Channel Galbraith Hepburn, Canadian Chaplain Service.
- Temporary Captain Ernest Hudson Holland, Motor Machine Gun Brigade.
- Captain Charles Burton Hornby, Infantry.
- Lieutenant William Jesse Edward Howard, Infantry.
- Captain Ashley Cooper Cornell Johnston, Army Medical Corps.
- Lieutenant Frederick Graham Johnston, Artillery.
- Captain James Colin Kemp, Infantry.
- Captain David Kyle, Army Service Corps.
- Captain Arthur Gorham Lawson, Divisional Signal Company.
- Lieutenant (acting Captain) John Wentworth Lewis, Mounted Rifles.
- Captain James McKerras MacDonnell, Field Artillery.
- Lieutenant Athol Herridge MacFarlane, Mounted Rifles.
- Lieutenant Douglas Neil McCallum, Field Artillery.
- Lieutenant Frederick Stanley McPherson, Engineers.
- Captain Arthur Leonard Mieville, Engineers.
- Captain Percival Molson.
- Lieutenant Frederick Garth Morse, Field Artillery.
- Lieutenant Dean Newton, Infantry.
- Lieutenant (acting Captain) Frederick James O'Leary.
- Lieutenant James Collins Farish Owen, Canadian Local Forces, and Royal Flying Corps.
- Lieutenant Leslie Frank Pearce, Infantry.
- Lieutenant Thomas Escott Ryder, Artillery.
- Lieutenant Allan Nye Scott, Engineers.
- Lieutenant Mathew Henry Scott, Field Artillery.
- Lieutenant William Arthur Steel, Engineers.
- Captain Albert Newton Stirrett, Army Service Corps.
- Lieutenant (temporary Captain) Charles Goldie Sutherland, Army Medical Corps.
- Lieutenant Andrew Cecil Meredith Thomson, Infantry.
- Captain William George Turner, Army Medical Corps.
- Captain Hugh MacDonell Wallis, Infantry.
- Lieutenant Karl Weatherbe, Engineers.
- Lieutenant Alfred Cyril White.
- Lieutenant James Alexander Gordon White, Cavalry.
- 54340 Regimental Sergeant Major William John White, Infantry.
- Lieutenant Charles Kenneth Whittaker, Field Artillery.

Egyptian Army

- El Mulazim Tani Ahmed Effendi Abd El Wahab Beheiri, Egyptian Army.
- El Mulazim Awal Mahfuz Effendi Nada, Artillery, Egyptian Army.
- Yuzbashi Wadia Effendi Tanuis Ghusn, Medical Corps, Egyptian Army.

New Zealand Forces

- Captain Harold Eric Barrowclough.
- 2nd Lieutenant Charles Wynne Chilcott, N.Z. Engineers.
- 4/1121 Lieutenant Guy Shackburgh Collyns, N.Z. Engineers.
- Lieutenant George Dittmer, N.Z. Force.
- Lieutenant (temporary Captain) Robert Paul Harper.
- Captain Dudley Kettle, N.Z. Force.
- 2nd Lieutenant Stuart Gordon McDonald, N.Z. Force.
- 2nd Lieutenant John Alexander McQueen, N.Z. Force.
- Captain Frederick Hector Edward Morgan.
- 13/528 Squadron Sergeant Major William Palmer, Mounted Rifles.
- Lieutenant Harry Archer Potvine, N.Z. Army Service Corps.
- Captain Robert Gleadow Purdy, N.Z. Staff Corps.
- Captain Aubrey Vincent Short, N.Z. Medical Corps.
- Lieutenant Herbert Simmonds, N.Z. Force.
- 2nd Lieutenant Wilfred Fosbery Stilwell, N.Z. Divisional Signal Company.
- Lieutenant Mervyn Roy Walker, N.Z. Force.
- Captain Herbert Henry Whyte, N.Z. Field Artillery.
- 2nd Lieutenant Edward Gordon Williams, Mounted Rifles.
- Captain Richard William Wrightson, N.Z. Force.

South African Forces

- Captain Fritz Baumann Adler, South African Field Artillery.
- Captain Rudolph John Bell, South African Service Corps.
- Captain Edgar Frederick Bradstock.
- Captain Ferdinand Lindley Augustus Buchanan, South African Infantry.
- 2nd Lieutenant Frederick William Severine Burton, South African Infantry.
- Lieutenant Dennis St. John Clowes, South African Field Artillery.
- Captain William Charles Cock, South African Forces.
- Temporary Captain Stephanus Nicolaus Cronje, 1st South African Rifles.
- Temporary Captain Joseph Atkinson Dingwall, Royal Engineers.
- Captain Dudley Fenn. South African Service Corps.
- Temporary Lieutenant David Joshua Hamer.
- Captain Edgar Henry Malachi Hardiman, South African Infantry.
- Captain Leonard Norman Hay, South African Infantry.
- Captain Andrew George Hendri, British South African Police.
- Captain Frederick Ernest Jackson, South African Signal Company.
- Captain Stanley Conway John, South African Rifles.
- Lieutenant (temporary Captain) Hugh Marston Ladell, South African Service Corps.
- Captain Robert Patrick McNeill, South African Medical Corps.
- 2nd Lieutenant Neville William Methven, South African Sharpshooters.
- Captain George James Moore, South African Engineering Corps.
- Lieutenant (now Temporary Major) Montague Headland Pike, South African Mounted Regiment.
- Temporary Captain George Herbert Bonsier Raymond, South African Forces.
- Captain Adrian Murray Robertson, South African Service Corps.
- Lieutenant (temporary Captain) James Robertson, South African Infantry.
- Captain Charles Duncan Cogwell Smuts, South African Service Corps.
- Temporary Captain Leslie Francis Sprenger, South African Infantry.
- Captain Francis Trant Stevens, British South African Police.
- Lieutenant Harold Swifte, South African Mounted Rifles.
- Captain Reginald Tomlinson, South African Infantry.
- Captain Daniel Peter Wessel Van Zyl, South African Engineering Corps.
- Captain (now Temporary Major) Chaplain William Hall Watson, South African Chaplain's Department.
- Captain Percival Frederick Foylan White, South African Infantry.
- Lieutenant Thomas H. Wilson, South African Engineering Corps.

=== Distinguished Conduct Medal (DCM) ===
- 1867 Acting Regimental Sergeant Major J. Adams, King's Royal Rifle Corps, attached London Regiment.
- 200024 Sergeant R. Adamson, Royal Lancaster Regiment, attached Trench Mortar Battery.
- 139244 Sergeant W. Aitken, Royal Engineers.
- 75733 Sapper F. Alcock, Royal Engineers.
- 60741 Battery Sergeant Major F. Allen, Royal Field Artillery.
- 10054 Lance Corporal P. Allford, Royal Inniskilling Fusiliers.
- 3813 Staff Sergeant Major C. C. Ambrose, Lancers.
- 16/416 Company Quartermaster Sergeant H. S. Armstrong, Northumberland Fusiliers.
- 63893 Driver (acting Bombardier) F. Arnold, Royal Field Artillery.
- 66940 Sergeant C. Baldwin, Royal Engineers.
- 10616 Company Sergeant Major J. Banbridge, Middlesex Regiment.
- 51037 Corporal R. Barham, Royal Garrison Artillery.
- 67224 Gunner A. Barlow, Royal Garrison Artillery.
- 10145 Company Sergeant Major F. Barnard, Royal Sussex Regiment.
- 23307 Sergeant W. J. Barnes, Royal Engineers.
- 13/26 Company Sergeant Major R. Barr, Royal Irish Rifles.
- 18830 Sergeant F. Bell, Royal Army Medical Corps.
- 19693 Corporal W. Bell, Northumberland Fusiliers.
- 2112 Private H. Bill, Leinster Regiment.
- 8066 Company Sergeant Major H. Bingham, Manchester Regiment.
- 28523 Battery Sergeant Major J. Bissett, Royal Garrison Artillery.
- 3273 Sergeant H. W. Botting, Royal Garrison Artillery.
- 10601 Private E. Brady, Royal Irish Fusiliers.
- 15895 Private E. Brewer, Duke of Cornwall's Light Infantry.
- 55789 Bombardier P. Brick, Royal Garrison Artillery.
- 6776 Quartermaster Sergeant F. Brown, York and Lancaster Regiment.
- 52261 Sergeant-Major G. W. Brown, Royal Engineers.
- 8754 Sergeant-Major H. Brown, Lancashire Fusiliers Battery.
- 8726 Battery Sergeant Major (acting Regimental Sergeant Major) W. E. Brown, Royal Garrison Artillery.
- 106218 Battery Sergeant Major Edwin George Curry Bryant, Royal Field Artillery.
- A/773 Company Sergeant Major A. G. Bull, King's Royal Rifle Corps.
- 3322 Sergeant J. H. Bullock, Royal Field Artillery.
- 5502 Quartermaster Sergeant H. Burfeind, Essex Regiment.
- 13340 Company Sergeant Major J. Burns, Royal Scots Fusiliers.
- S/2946 Company Sergeant Major R Burns, Seaforth Highlanders.
- 200008 Acting Regimental Sergeant Major W. Burt, Middlesex Regiment (formerly 207).
- 8634 Sergeant W. Burtoft, Yorkshire Light Infantry.
- 2275 Acting Company Sergeant Major G. Brown, Royal Highlanders.
- 645183 Corporal D. Campbell, Royal Field Artillery.
- 1039 Sergeant A. Clark, Motor Machine Gun Corps.
- S/3799 Sergeant W. Clark, Royal Highlanders.
- 782 Company Sergeant Major A. Clarke, Manchester Regiment.
- 21879 Battery Quartermaster Sergeant F. Clarke, Royal Field Artillery.
- 55606 Bombardier (acting Corporal) G. Clarke, Royal Garrison Artillery.
- 27415 Wheelwright Corporal W. Clarke, Royal Field Artillery.
- 18107 Private W. Clarke, Royal Berkshire Regiment.
- 94403 Sergeant T. E. Clavey. Royal Field Artillery.
- 66739 Sergeant W. Clow, Royal Garrison Artillery.
- 101154 2nd Corporal (acting Corporal) T. Colclough, Royal Engineers.
- 241643 Sergeant H. Coleman, Gloucestershire Regiment (formerly 4754).
- 9636 Sergeant H. Coles, Gloucestershire Regiment.
- 39434 Driver J. N. Collard, Royal Field Artillery.
- 9629 Corporal B. Colley, Royal West Surrey Regiment.
- 8511 Sergeant J. Collins, Royal Berkshire Regiment.
- S13778 Private J. Cook, Rifle Brigade.
- 1852 Battery Sergeant Major A. G. Cooper. Royal Garrison Artillery.
- 99823 Battery Sergeant Major J. H. Cooper, Royal Garrison Artillery.
- S/43205 Private G. Cormack. Gordon Highlanders.
- 15015 Acting Sergeant H. Cornwell. Somerset Light Infantry.
- 200552 Sergeant W. G. Cox, London Regiment (formerly 2235).
- L/10522 Sergeant B. Crossby, Royal Fusiliers.
- 35426 Acting Battery Sergeant Major J. Cumming, Royal Field Artillery.
- 240854 Sergeant P. B. Cummings, Gloucestershire Regiment (formerly 2921).
- 3678 Sergeant H. D. H. Cummins, Rifle Brigade.
- 450 Company Sergeant Major Instructor J. Curley, Army Gymnastic Staff.
- 2372 Sergeant J. T. Curley, Lancashire Fusiliers.
- 17937 Private F. Darby, Worcestershire Regiment.
- R/5633 Sergeant Major A. Davies, King's Royal Rifle Corps.
- RMA/9996 Acting Battery Sergeant-Major W. Davis, attached South African Heavy Artillery.
- 9288 Sergeant (acting Company Sergeant Major) S. Dawkins, Royal Engineers.
- 46358 Corporal A. C. Dean, Manchester Regiment.
- G/19394 Sergeant E. Dean, Middlesex Regiment.
- 22185 Private F. L. Dickinson, Durham Light Infantry.
- 6642 Sergeant H. Disney, Machine Gun Corps.
- 14/1048 Sergeant-Major G. F. Downes, Royal Warwickshire Regiment.
- 8221 Sergeant-Major J. Duke, Border Regiment.
- 230854 Company Sergeant Major A. E. Easthope, London Regiment (formerly 2868).
- 20/1563 Corporal T. Easton, Northumberland Fusiliers.
- 62074 Driver C. Edmonds, Royal Field Artillery.
- 52905 Company Sergeant Major J. Edwards, Royal Engineers.
- 53465 Sergeant P. Edwards, Royal Field Artillery.
- 18447 Acting Sergeant T. Edwards, Royal Welsh Fusiliers.
- 14581 Corporal W. Edwards, Royal Field Artillery.
- 51070 Sergeant-Major J. W. Embleton, Royal Field Artillery.
- 203128 Sergeant J. Eunson, West Yorkshire Regiment (formerly 6494).
- 7656 Sergeant J. C. Farmer, Lincolnshire Regiment.
- 32727 Sapper H. W. Fiddy, Royal Engineers.
- 8261 Sergeant (acting Company Sergeant Major) W. C. Field, South Lancashire Regiment.
- 13339 Sergeant E. S. Fitch, Lincolnshire Regiment.
- 848 Company Sergeant Major (acting Regimental Sergeant Major) G. H. Floater, King's Royal Rifle Corps.
- 18/215 Sergeant J. Forsyth, Northumberland Fusiliers.
- 4/8307 Corporal (acting Sergeant) G. Galloway, West Yorkshire Regiment.
- S/18846 Private D. Gait, Cameron Highlanders.
- 12970 Private J. G. Gardner, Durham Light Infantry.
- 29970 Sergeant J. P. Garvey, Royal Engineers.
- 41095 Sergeant Sydney Walter Johnson Geard, Machine Gun Corps.
- 9322 Sergeant E. Gent, Dorsetshire Regiment.
- 240428 Sergeant T. G. Goodchild, Lincolnshire Regiment (formerly 2304).
- 12337 Sergeant C. B. Green, Manchester Regiment.
- 1660 Flight Sergeant G. Greenfield, Royal Flying Corps.
- 59596 Company Sergeant Major D. Greenstock, Royal Engineers.
- 11982 Corporal F. Greenway, Worcestershire Regiment.
- 5404 Sergeant-Major P. Grieve, East Yorkshire Regiment.
- 18/407 Signal Sergeant G. W. Halstead, West Yorkshire Regiment.
- 12833 Sergeant-Major J. E. Hanney, Royal Field Artillery.
- 6887 Company Sergeant Major H. F. Hammersley, Nottinghamshire and Derbyshire Regiment.
- 37686 Lance Corporal (acting Sergeant) H. Harmer, Royal Engineers.
- 15149 Sergeant H. Hartley, Royal Welsh Fusiliers.
- 27528 Sergeant H. S. Harvey, Royal Garrison Artillery.
- 8/13320 Corporal J. C. Harvey, South Staffordshire Regiment.
- 11842 Sergeant-Major S. Harvey, Cheshire Regiment.
- 30603 Battery Sergeant Major Alfred Charles Hayhoe, Royal Garrison Artillery.
- 51657 Corporal E. W. Haynes, Royal Horse Artillery.
- 305010 Company Sergeant Major E. Haywood, Nottinghamshire and Derbyshire Regiment (formerly No. 517).
- 59914 Sergeant L. Hefford, Royal Field Artillery.
- 127360 Gunner E. Hemingway, Royal Field Artillery.
- 1393 Company Quartermaster Sergeant T. Henderson, Gordon Highlanders.
- 2984 Company Quartermaster Sergeant A. Herbertson, South Staffordshire Regiment.
- 89597 Sapper (acting Corporal) J. Hill, Royal Engineers.
- 240013 Company Sergeant Major J. R. Hill, Leicestershire Regiment (formerly 534).
- T/14874 (acting Staff Sergeant Major) Staff Sergeant Major F. Hoad, Army Service Corps.
- 11468 Sergeant D. Hoare, Northumberland Fusiliers.
- 240041 Company Sergeant Major H. Holland, Nottinghamshire and Derbyshire Regiment (formerly no. 456).
- 310471 Corporal W. Hopkins, Royal Garrison Artillery.
- 58230 Bombardier W. Horner, Royal Garrison Artillery.
- M2/033691 Private (acting Sergeant) Frank Vautier Houchen, Army Service Corps.
- 10016 Sergeant A. E. Howard, Bedfordshire Regiment.
- 6166 Sergeant B. Hubbard, West Yorkshire Regiment.
- 20270 Company Sergeant Major J. Hudson, Liverpool Regiment.
- 22126 Company Sergeant Major G. H. Hunter. Liverpool Regiment.
- 32495 Company Sergeant Major W. J. Incledon, Royal Lancaster Regiment.
- 10091 Lance Corporal J. A. Ironside, Royal Scots Fusiliers.
- 8040 Sergeant A. E. Janaway, Dorsetshire Regiment.
- 21835 Company Quartermaster Sergeant P. Jarvis, Machine Gun Corps.
- 41179 Bombardier A. Jones, Royal Field Artillery.
- 8510 Lance Sergeant E. Jones, Royal Welsh Fusiliers.
- 63550 Sergeant F. Jordan, Royal Field Artillery.
- S/681 Private G. H. Keeling, Rifle Brigade.
- 1366 Corporal (acting Sergeant) C. S. Kenward, Royal Sussex Regiment.
- 13028 Lance Sergeant J. W. Kimberley, Nottinghamshire and Derbyshire Regiment.
- 279 Flight Sergeant (acting Sergeant Major) C. E. King, Royal Flying Corps.
- 230745 Quartermaster Sergeant J. E. Lagden, London Regiment (formerly No. 2656).
- 20384 Corporal W. Lamond, Machine Gun Corps.
- 1657 Lance Corporal C. Lane, Lancers.
- 1908 Corporal E. Langridge, Royal Flying Corps.
- 700295 Company Sergeant Major F. A. Langton, London Regiment (formerly No. 1968).
- 8953 Company Sergeant Major E. Latham, North Staffordshire Regiment.
- 8563 Sergeant E. Lea, Royal West Surrey Regiment.
- 21522 Sergeant G. Lee, Machine Gun Corps.
- 23884 Acting Regimental Sergeant Major C. Lewis, Welsh Regiment.
- 1583 Gunner (acting Bombardier) H. E. Lewis, Royal Field Artillery.
- 110751 Bombardier S. Linton, Royal Field Artillery.
- 14763 Corporal J. Locker, West Yorkshire Regiment.
- 22187 Sergeant-Major C. W. Macey, Suffolk Regiment.
- 390569 Company Sergeant Major E. T. Mackenna, London Regiment (formerly No. 2740).
- 250089 Sergeant S. Maddison, Durham Light Infantry (formerly No. 1757).
- 9577 Company Sergeant Major J. Magee, Royal Irish Rifles.
- 10588 Sergeant T. Mallett, Nottinghamshire and Derbyshire Regiment.
- 100566 Lance Corporal (acting Sergeant) F. Marsh, Royal Engineers.
- 20092 Sergeant G. Martin, Northumberland Fusiliers.
- 9578 Corporal (acting Sergeant) A. Mason, Bedfordshire Regiment.
- 85209 Lance Corporal (acting 2nd Corporal) E. Mason, Royal Engineers.
- M2/130588 Private T. C. Mason, Army Service Corps.
- 200411 Company Sergeant Major C. H. Masters, Lincolnshire Regiment (formerly No. 2322).
- 19936 Sergeant F. McGann, Yorkshire Regiment.
- 89747 Bombardier J. McNicol, Royal Field Artillery.
- 8943 Lance Sergeant H. Melham, South Wales Borderers.
- 6450 Sapper (acting Farrier Sergeant) A. R. Mills, Royal Engineers.
- 14790 Sergeant W. E. Mortlock, Middlesex Regiment.
- 147 Sergeant T. J. Mountford, Royal Flying Corps.
- 15051 Sergeant P. Moyles, Yorkshire Light Infantry.
- L/5079 Company Sergeant Major R. Mullett, Royal Sussex Regiment.
- 831483 Corporal D. Munday, Royal Field Artillery (formerly 3807).
- 3/3731 Quartermaster Sergeant J. Munro, Royal Highlanders.
- 352 Acting Sergeant D. Murphy, Royal Fusiliers.
- 240094 Sergeant B. Nellist, Yorkshire Regiment (formerly 1199).
- 50798 Corporal P. S. D. O'Keefe, Machine Gun Corps.
- 200064 Company Sergeant Major (acting Regimental Sergeant Major) C. H. Parrott, London Regiment (formerly No. 995).
- 9245 Sergeant E. Parry, North Lancashire Regiment.
- 20989 Acting Company Sergeant Major J. A. Peate, King's Own Scottish Borderers.
- 200064 Company Sergeant Major (acting Regimental Sergeant Major) J. Pennyfather, Northamptonshire Regiment.
- 6642 Corporal J. W. Perry, Royal Surrey Regiment.
- 13456 Sergeant S. Phillips, Gloucestershire Regiment.
- Spts./269 Company Sergeant Major F. Pilkington, Royal Fusiliers.
- 42757 Gunner D. Pipe, Royal Garrison Artillery.
- 289 Company Sergeant Major C. E. Pittaway, East Yorkshire Regiment.
- 26257 Private A. E. Pizey, Welsh Regiment.
- 49628 Sergeant R. Y. Plane, Royal Engineers.
- 7963 Company Sergeant Major E. Potter, Royal Munster Fusiliers.
- 18623 Sergeant J. Price, Durham Light Infantry.
- 45402 Bombardier H. P. Prince, Royal Field Artillery.
- 14128 Lance Corporal W. Prior, Middlesex Regiment.
- 18295 Battery Quartermaster Sergeant B. S. Redfern, Royal Garrison Artillery.
- 72923 Sergeant C. Rendle, Machine Gun Corps.
- 32723 Acting 2nd Corporal R. Rennie, Royal Engineers.
- 5156 Company Sergeant Major B. Reynolds, Royal Fusiliers.
- 7345 Sergeant (acting Company Sergeant Major) H. W. Richardson, Royal Engineers.
- 49644 Corporal (acting Sergeant) J. Rigby, Royal Army Medical Corps.
- 22729 Private C. W Riley, South Wales Borderers.
- 24/1148 Sergeant H. T. Robson, Northumberland Fusiliers.
- 81542 Sergeant A. C. Rogers, Royal Engineers.
- 6729 1st Class Air Mechanic E. Rogers, Royal Flying Corps.
- 265490 Company Sergeant Major J. H. Rolfe, Oxfordshire and Buckinghamshire Light Infantry (formerly No. 2056).
- 35313 Acting Bombardier A. Rosher, Royal Garrison Artillery.
- 24889 Sergeant J. Roskell, Royal Field Artillery.
- 636 Private J. Ruddick, Machine Gun Guards.
- 44626 Sergeant J. Ruddick, Royal Engineers.
- 49447 Corporal S. J. Sargent, Royal Engineers.
- 46082 Sergeant R. H. Sayer, Royal Horse Artillery.
- 658 Corporal (acting Sergeant Major) A. M. Scott, Military Mounted Police.
- Ply./13790 Sergeant (acting Colour Sergeant) W. G. Scott, Royal Marine Light Infantry.
- 15848 Corporal (Lance Sergeant) J.Scriven, Shropshire Light Infantry.
- 3200 Sergeant-Major E. Seymour, East Surrey Regiment.
- 350431 Lance Sergeant A. G. Shadwell, London Regiment (formerly No. 1987).
- 48455 Acting Corporal W. Shannon, Royal Engineers.
- S/9571 Private T. Sharp, Seaforth Highlanders.
- R/1286 Private W. H. Shaw, Kings Royal Rifle Corps.
- T/2/10560 Driver J. C. V. Shipp, Army Service Corps.
- 156028 Acting Lance Corporal J. Simm, Royal Engineers.
- 14655 2nd Corporal (acting Sergeant) E. Simms, Royal Engineers.
- 37111 Sergeant E. Single, Royal Garrison Artillery.
- 200876 Private J. A. Skeen, Yorkshire Regiment (formerly 3233).
- 19014 Private R. Skull, Wiltshire Regiment.
- 13821 Company Sergeant Major T. J. Sloley, Machine Gun Corps.
- S/7940 Sergeant A. J. Smart, Rifle Brigade.
- 308658 Sergeant J. H. Smith, Royal Garrison Artillery (formerly 1402).
- 2831 Battery Sergeant Major T R. Smith, Royal Garrison Artillery.
- 9634 Company Sergeant Major A. Smedley, Welsh Regiment.
- S4/055789 Sergeant (acting Squadron Quartermaster Sergeant) G. Sneddon, Army Service Corps.
- C/9809 Sergeant C. E. Starkey, King's Royal Rifle Corps.
- L/21189 Corporal John Alfred William Stratton, Royal Field Artillery.
- M2/050087 Sergeant F. Taylor, Army Service Corps.
- 9946 Corporal (acting Sergeant) W. Taylor, Gloucestershire Regiment.
- 32176 Sergeant A. Thomas, Royal Garrison Artillery.
- 50711 Corporal J. Thomas, Royal Field Artillery.
- 15754 Acting Sergeant C. H. Thompson, Royal Engineers.
- 74959 Sergeant W. E. Thompson, Royal Engineers.
- 10300 Corporal (Lance Sergeant) W. H. A. Trew, Duke of Cornwall's Light Infantry.
- 45758 Private J. Trodden, Royal Welsh Fusiliers.
- 33904 Sergeant M. Troth, Royal Field Artillery.
- 34069 Pioneer (acting Corporal) J. Trillian, Royal Engineers.
- 23830 Corporal (acting Sergeant) W. H. Tyler, Royal Engineers.
- 8809 Private E. Upperton, Oxfordshire and Buckinghamshire Light Infantry.
- 42003 Sergeant J. Vincent, Royal Field Artillery.
- 87408 Corporal G. A. Walker, Royal Engineers.
- 12185 Sergeant J. W. Walker, Royal Horse Artillery.
- L/9905 Company Sergeant Major W. J. Walls, Royal Sussex Regiment.
- 49872 Sergeant T. Walmsley, Royal Field Artillery.
- 5454 Lance Corporal (acting Quartermaster Sergeant) R. Wanless, Dragoon Guards.
- 240419 Lance Sergeant H. Watts, North Staffordshire Regiment (formerly No. 2416).
- 47678 Corporal W. Waugh, Royal Field Artillery.
- 67599 Sergeant E. H. Weaver, Royal Field Artillery.
- 6690 Quartermaster Sergeant G. Webb, Lancashire Fusiliers.
- S/26420 Lance Corporal H. H. Webster, Rifle Brigade.
- Stk/867 Corporal (Lance Sergeant) S. Welcome, Royal Fusiliers.
- 9552 Sergeant-Major J. Weldon, Northumberland Fusiliers.
- 6726 Company Sergeant Major (acting Regimental Sergeant Major) A. A. West, Royal Scots.
- S/4228 Company Quartermaster Sergeant J. T. Whitelaw, Seaforth Highlanders.
- 10099 Sergeant W. Whitney, Shropshire Light Infantry.
- 265011 Company Quartermaster Sergeant F. Wilkinson, West Yorkshire Regiment (formerly No. 433).
- 104372 2nd Corporal F. W. Wilkinson, Royal Engineers.
- 4947 Sergeant G. T. Willett, Northamptonshire Regiment.
- 460 Staff Sergeant H. Williams, Royal Marine Artillery.
- 1397 Private (acting Corporal) W. H. Williams, Lincolnshire Regiment.
- 833 Sergeant W. Wilson, Durham Light Infantry.
- 24372 Sapper W. Winzer, Royal Engineers.
- 11712 Company Sergeant Major D. Wood, Highland Light Infantry.
- 14767 Company Sergeant Major G. T. Wood, South Lancashire Regiment.
- 9952 Lance Corporal C. G. Woodward, Manchester Regiment.
- 6392 Company Sergeant Major G. Wooley, Leicestershire Regiment.
- 2443 Sergeant (acting Company Sergeant Major) T. Woolnough, Royal Engineers.
- 19151 Sergeant C. W. Wright, York and Lancaster Regiment.
- 51121 Quartermaster Sergeant W. H. Yarroll, Royal Field Artillery.
- 960275 Sergeant (acting Sergeant Major) J. H. Young, Royal Field Artillery.
- 53688 Corporal P. Young, Royal Engineers.

Australian Imperial Force

- 2139 Lance Corporal N. Barclay, Infantry.
- 29 Sergeant C. H. Batchelor, Engineers.
- 199 Acting Bombardier W. Carlin, Artillery.
- 502 Corporal B. A. Collins, Infantry.
- 5154 2nd Corporal S. Collyer, Engineers.
- 5702 Lance Corporal (now 2nd Lieutenant) A. Cronin, Engineers.
- 1369 Corporal T. R. Evans, Machine Gun Corps.
- 2142 Sergeant R. T. R. Foster, Infantry.
- 110 Sergeant H. Fraser, Engineers.
- 2648 Private A. G. Gaukrodger, Infantry.
- 4500 Sergeant W. Gidlow, Pioneer Battalion (formerly No. 8).
- 7955 Staff Sergeant A. J. McG. Higgs, Army Service Corps.
- 5256 Corporal N. A. Holmes, Field Artillery.
- 946 Sergeant W. Hurley, Infantry.
- 602 Corporal F. Jackson, Engineers.
- 1796 Armament Artificer N. Miller, Army Ordnance Corps, attached Field Artillery.
- 379 Sergeant W. Owens, Field Artillery.
- 672 Staff Sergeant P. C. Piper, Engineers.
- 3599 Private P. G. Reid, Infantry.
- 536 Sergeant T. W. Rourke, Infantry.
- 1326 Sergeant T. D. Tierney, Infantry.
- 4377 Sergeant W. T. Watson, Artillery.
- 550 Lance Sergeant W. S. Weeks, Infantry.
- 2490 Private J. Wood, Infantry.

Canadian Contingent

- 27439 Sergeant D. G. Bell, Infantry.
- 18155 Company Sergeant Major G. P. Blanchard, Infantry.
- 24118 Sergeant W. A. Cooper, Infantry.
- 390397 Corporal W. Danby, Canadian Artillery.
- 79390 Private A. B. Davies, Infantry.
- 448088 Lance Corporal J. Evans, Machine Gun Service.
- 11569 Sergeant C. N. Foster, Machine Gun Service.
- 420053 Lance Corporal J. Giles, Infantry.
- 529566 Corporal T. H. Goodeve, Army Medical Corps.
- 142 Company Sergeant Major P. V. Harcourt, Engineers.
- 13649 Corporal (acting Sergeant) L. B. Hughes, Infantry.
- 166574 Corporal A. J. Langford, Pioneer Battalion.
- 167058 Sergeant L. M. Larsen, Pioneer Battalion.
- 21279 Sergeant P. B. Legg, Infantry.
- 401059 Corporal N. V. Levy, Infantry.
- 69522 Company Sergeant Major R. B. Lloyd, Infantry.
- 418001 Battery Sergeant-Major P. W. Macfarlane, Infantry.
- 92891 Bombardier P. W. MacNevin, Artillery.
- 423673 Sergeant-Major P. J. Marshall, Infantry.
- 4/26830 Sergeant D. McAndie, Infantry.
- 7570 Company Sergeant Major E. Nicholls, Infantry.
- 23217 Company Sergeant Major (acting Regimental Sergeant Major) J. Patterson, Infantry.
- 43167 Sergeant J. Paul, Artillery.
- 2182 Corporal P. Quinn, Cyclists Company.
- 85664 Sergeant G. W. Sinnis, Artillery.
- 55941 Sergeant (acting Company Sergeant Major) W. J. Squibb, Infantry.
- 426943 Private G. Tomlinson, Infantry Battery.
- 40903 Battery Sergeant-Major F. M. Vagg, Artillery Battery.
- 25547 Battery Sergeant-Major W. Wallis, Infantry.
- 66068 Private J. Wilson, Infantry.

New Zealand Force

- 25/708 Sergeant H. Anderson, Rifle Brigade.
- 26/1161 Private W. T. Douglas, Rifle Brigade.
- 25/864 Private J. Hansen, Rifle Brigade.
- 7/2219 Sergeant V. G. Hunter.
- 12/3795 Sergeant S. Robinson.
- 23/923 Lance Sergeant H. Struthers, Rifle Brigade.
- 2/1469 Sergeant J. H. Taplin, Artillery.
- 23/1213 Sergeant J. A. Taylor.

South African Force

- S/6 Lance Corporal F. C. Horne.
- 1607 Private G. G. Tanner, Infantry.
- 50 Battery Sergeant-Major H. G. Warman, Artillery.

=== Meritorious Service Medal (MSM) ===
Awarded for valuable services rendered with the Armies in the Field

- S/4/232724 Private W. A. Abel, Army Service Corps.
- 200917 Sergeant-Major A. J. Abrahams, Worcestershire Regiment.
- 14774 Company Sergeant Major (acting Sergeant Major) W. Adams, Royal Artillery.
- S/31496 Private (acting Squadron Quartermaster Sergeant) T. H. Airey, Army Service Corps.
- 16796 Flight Sergeant W. Anderson, Royal Flying Corps.
- 9992 Company Sergeant Major (acting Regimental Sergeant Major) W. Anderson, Scots Guards.
- 15830 Company Quartermaster Sergeant T. Anglesea, Royal Lancaster Regiment.
- 266 Flight Sergeant (acting Sergeant Major) J. A. Aspinall, Royal Flying Corps.
- 17833 Corporal (acting Sergeant) W. O. Aston, Royal Engineers.
- 12302 Sergeant E. W. Astrand, Norfolk Regiment.
- S/13214 1st Class Staff Sergeant Major W. G. Bailey, Army Service Corps.
- Ms/1752 Mechanic Staff Sergeant A. G. Baldwin, Army Service Corps.
- S/17389 Staff Sergeant Major W. Barnes, Army Service Corps.
- 4036 Sergeant R. W. Bate, Royal Field Artillery.
- 6682 Corporal T. A. Bates, Royal Flying Corps.
- 13776 Corporal (acting Quartermaster Sergeant) C. F. Bawtree, Middlesex Regiment.
- 720096 Quartermaster Sergeant A. J. Beer, London Regiment.
- 20476 Sergeant (Engineer Clerk) S. P. Bethell, Royal Engineers.
- 76265 Company Quartermaster Sergeant A. Blackstock, Royal Engineers.
- 4372 Quartermaster Sergeant (acting Squadron Sergeant Major) F. H. Bonner, Lincolnshire Regiment.
- S/27183 Private (acting Sergeant) J. Brett, Army Service Corps.
- 46196 (acting Bombardier) Gunner S. H. Brian, Royal Guard Artillery.
- 1087 Flight Sergeant (acting Sergeant Major) C. W. Brown.
- 27485 Company Sergeant Major (acting Quartermaster Sergeant) H. J. Brown, Royal Engineers.
- 471276 Corporal W. Brown, London Regiment.
- 65090 Company Sergeant Major G. H. Buck, Royal Engineers.
- S/16328 Staff Sergeant (acting Squadron Quartermaster Sergeant) J. Buckley, Army Service Corps.
- S/17201 Corporal (acting Squadron Quartermaster Sergeant) G. Bullard, Army Service Corps.
- 950 Acting Sergeant Major C. E. H. Bunting, Royal Flying Corps.
- 620 Quartermaster Sergeant (acting Superintending Clerk) H. D. Burrage, Royal Engineers.
- 70013 Sergeant F. W. Burton, Royal Engineers.
- 7430 Private (acting Staff Sergeant) W. Butterfield, Army Ordnance Corps.
- 88563 Battery Sergeant Major C. Byart, Royal Field Artillery.
- 2688 Armament Staff Sergeant L. O. Carr, Army Ordnance Corps.
- 12817 Company Quartermaster Sergeant A. E. Cawsey, Royal Engineers.
- 56134 Sergeant A. S. Chamberlain, Royal Engineers.
- S/16235 Staff Sergeant Major (acting 1st Class Staff Sergeant Major) A. E. Chambers, Army Service Corps.
- S4/248427 Sergeant (acting Staff Sergeant) F. Charnock, Army Service Corps.
- 54641 Private (acting Sub-Conductor) P. W. Chitty, Army Ordnance Corps.
- 291 Sergeant (acting Sergeant Major) J. F. Clarke, Royal Flying Corps.
- 240525 Acting Corporal S. D. Clarke, Cheshire Regiment.
- 94744 Acting Sergeant A. B. Clifford, Royal Engineers.
- S/26897 Corporal (acting Lance Sergeant) E. W. Collins. Army Service Corps.
- 24760 Sergeant J. J. Collins, Postal Service, Royal Engineers.
- 83767 Sergeant-Major T. W. Comfort, Royal Army Medical Corps.
- M/36389 Private (acting Company Sergeant Major) J. Concannon, Army Service Corps.
- 79030 Battery Sergeant-Major T. Condon, Royal Field Artillery.
- W/1794 Staff Sergeant (acting Sergeant Major) A. Conn, Military Provost Staff Corps.
- 9440 Quartermaster Sergeant (now temporary Quartermaster and Honorary Lieutenant) F. J. Cooper, Oxfordshire and Buckinghamshire Light Infantry.
- 2131 Flight Sergeant H. Cooper, Royal Flying Corps.
- S4/244622 Private (acting Staff Sergeant) F. E. Copland, Army Service Corps.
- 24152 Acting Corporal T. G. Copsey, Royal Engineers.
- T/12887 Company Quartermaster Sergeant (acting Staff Sergeant Major) J. J. A. Corrington, Army Service Corps.
- 830277 Corporal T. E. Cotterell, Royal Field Artillery.
- 1722 Armourer Staff Sergeant C. F. Cox, Army Ordnance Corps.
- S/16635 Sergeant (acting Squadron Quartermaster Sergeant) T. A. Davis, Army Service Corps.
- 2815 Battery Sergeant Major (acting Regimental Sergeant Major) E. Dawson, Royal Field Artillery.
- T/1/SR/957 Staff Sergeant Major J. T. Dear, Army Service Corps.
- S/21901 Sergeant (acting Staff Sergeant) W. Douglas, Army Service Corps.
- 10156 Corporal (acting Quartermaster Sergeant) C. Downton, Dorsetshire Regiment.
- 109637 Sergeant D. Dean, Royal Engineers.
- S/19487 Sergeant (acting Staff Sergeant) W. Devlin, Army Service Corps.
- 473235 Staff Sergeant F. Edmonds, Royal Army Medical Corps.
- T4/173375 Driver J. B. Edwards, Army Service Corps.
- 17612 Sergeant W. Evans, Royal Irish Rifles.
- T/14101 Company Sergeant Major (acting Squadron Sergeant Major) J. J. Eycott, Army Service Corps.
- 2715 Sergeant (acting Company Quartermaster Sergeant) C. Eyre, Royal Engineers.
- 194271 Acting Sergeant R. E. Farra, Royal Engineers.
- T/4/042576 Sergeant E. Faulkener, Army Service Corps.
- 325828 Sergeant R. J. Fenton, Cambridgeshire Regiment.
- 22994 Sergeant (Engineer Clerk) W. H. Finch, Royal Engineers.
- 87978 Battery Sergeant Major (acting Regimental Sergeant Major) E. Flint, Royal Garrison Artillery.
- S/26755 Corporal (acting Staff Sergeant) R. H. Floyd, Army Service Corps.
- S/2/SR/04371 Private (acting Sergeant) C. W. Foster, Army Service Corps.
- 24141 Company Sergeant Major E. R. Fraser, Machine Gun Corps.
- T4/045285 Staff Sergeant Major A. Froggatt, Army Service Corps.
- 51626 Battery Sergeant Major A. W. Galley, Royal Field Artillery.
- SS/3914 Corporal (acting Squadron Sergeant Major) G. E. Gatling, Army Service Corps.
- 6864 Corporal (acting Company Sergeant Major) L. George, West Riding Regiment.
- 106232 Acting Sergeant G. A. German, Royal Engineers.
- 75001 Sergeant W. J. Gibson, Machine Gun Corps.
- 14/44 Sergeant T. L. Gledhill, York and Lancaster Regiment.
- 8679 Quartermaster Sergeant (acting Sergeant Major) J. Golden, Royal Artillery.
- M2/045742 Mechanic Sergeant M. A. H. Gooch, Army Service Corps.
- M/26283 Corporal (acting Company Sergeant Major) F. J. Gray, Army Service Corps.
- T/13291 Corporal (acting Company Sergeant Major) G. Grayburn, Army Service Corps.
- 19844 Corporal (acting Quartermaster Sergeant) J. Green, Royal Army Medical Corps.
- 10953 Sergeant W. Green, Middlesex Regiment.
- 200788 Sergeant (acting Quartermaster Sergeant) W. J. Greenwald, Middlesex Regiment (formerly 3108).
- 27614 Sergeant (acting Company Sergeant Major) A. E. Gregory, Royal Engineers.
- 11123 Sergeant S. P. Griffin, Royal Engineers.
- 111323 Company Quartermaster Sergeant W. C. Griffiths, Royal Engineers.
- 559 Quartermaster Sergeant (acting Superintending Clerk) J. Gunn, Seaforth Highlanders.
- SS/3903 Staff Sergeant J.S. Hack, Army Service Corps.
- 1576 Sergeant G. H. Hall, Royal Flying Corps.
- SS/5251 Staff Sergeant J. W. Hall, Army Service Corps.
- 31310 Farrier Sergeant C. Hampton, Royal Field Artillery.
- 43810 Sergeant J. L. Hanks, Royal Engineers.
- 12253 Corporal H. Harrington, Essex Regiment.
- 39825 Sergeant (acting Sergeant Major) R. W. Harrison, Royal Flying Corps.
- 71524 Corporal A. Hart, Machine Gun Corps.
- MS/4087 Company Sergeant Major P. J. Harwood, Army Service Corps.
- 7073 Quartermaster Sergeant E. F. Hayball, Highland Light Infantry.
- 546006 Sergeant T. W. Hayday, Royal Engineers.
- 76 Battery Sergeant-Major D. W. Herd, Motor Machine Gun Corps.
- 3327 Quartermaster Sergeant (acting Sub-Conductor) A. S. Hicks, Army Ordnance Corps.
- 89812 Fitter Staff Sergeant J. Hilton, Royal Field Artillery.
- S./27209 Corporal (acting Staff Sergeant) J. N. Hingle, Army Service Corps.
- 27533 Sergeant (acting Company Sergeant Major) C. D. Hinman, Royal Engineers.
- 14567 Sergeant (acting Company Quartermaster Sergeant) H. O. Hogben, Royal Engineers.
- S/19908 Staff Sergeant (acting Squadron Sergeant Major) W. E. Hopkins, Army Service Corps.
- 58074 Farrier Staff Sergeant J. E. Hughes, Royal Garrison Artillery.
- C./535 Company Sergeant Major T. J. Humphreys, Army Service Corps.
- 276862 Engineer Clerk Quartermaster Sergeant B. J. Hunston, Royal Engineers.
- 27821 Company Quartermaster Sergeant W. G. Hunting, Royal Engineers.
- 784 Armament Staff Sergeant J. W. Hurley, Army Ordnance Corps.
- 6589 Private T. E. Hutchison, East Kent Regiment.
- 1374 Flight Sergeant G. Jappe, Royal Flying Corps.
- 51397 Sergeant C. H. Jefferson, Royal Engineers.
- 16740 Sapper (Temporary Staff Sergeant) H. Jelley, Royal Engineers.
- 74327 Lance Corporal (Engineer Clerk) W. E. A. Job, Royal Engineers.
- 320012 Company Quartermaster Sergeant A. W. Johnson, London Regiment.
- S2/10698 Staff Sergeant F. T. Johnson, Army Service Corps.
- S/5067 Sergeant-Major W. Johnstone, Seaforth Highlanders.
- 240015 Sergeant (acting Regimental Sergeant Major) A. Jones, Cheshire Regiment.
- 78 Company Sergeant Major (acting Sergeant Major) A. J. Jones, Royal Garrison Artillery.
- 7131 Acting Regimental Sergeant Major R. J. Jones, Liverpool Regiment.
- 7201 Company Quartermaster Sergeant (acting Regimental Sergeant Major) S. G. Jones, Royal Engineers.
- 5712 Sergeant (acting Sub-Conductor) C. G. Journeaux, Army Ordnance Corps.
- 13396 Sergeant (acting Company Sergeant Major) J. Keir, Royal Engineers.
- S/18038 Staff Sergeant Major (acting 1st Class Staff Sergeant Major) P.E. Keller, Army Service Corps.
- 4254 Flight Sergeant J. W. Kellett, Royal Flying Corps.
- 11714 Sergeant (Engineer Clerk Draughtsman) G.A.V. Kilby, Royal Engineers.
- Fitter Staff Sergeant B. Kilner, Royal Field Artillery.
- Sergeant M. L. Kimbell, Army Service Corps.
- 14858 Colour Sergeant (Orderly Room Sergeant) J. W. Kippen, King's Own Scottish Borderers.
- 49481 Farrier Quartermaster Sergeant J. Knight, Royal Field Artillery.
- /3959 Sergeant T. H. Ladd, Rifle Brigade.
- 28772 Private (acting Company Sergeant Major) I. O. La Hive, Cavalry, Army Gymnastic Staff.
- 925219 Battery Sergeant-Major W. J. Lancaster, Royal Field Artillery.
- 10942 Flight Sergeant E. A. Lane, Royal Flying Corps.
- S/32188 Private (acting Squadron Quartermaster Sergeant) H. V. Lane, Army Service Corps.
- 7699 Private (Lance Corporal) H. Lawton, Lincolnshire Regiment.
- 5826 Sergeant A. E. le Gresly, Royal Engineers.
- M2/022285 Sergeant E. A. Leigh, Army Service Corps.
- 305219 Sergeant (acting Regimental Quartermaster Sergeant) H. W. Lewis, Warwickshire Regiment.
- 412012 Corporal (acting Sergeant) J. Lindsay, Royal Engineers.
- S/13377 Staff Sergeant Major (acting 1st Class Staff Sergeant Major) W. Locke, Army Service Corps.
- 118 Corporal G. H. Long, Army Service Corps.
- 70091 Quartermaster Sergeant W. Long, Royal Sussex Regiment.
- Acting Company Quartermaster Sergeant W. Long, Royal Engineers.
- 59 Flight Sergeant J. Longhurst, Royal Flying Corps.
- S4/240517 Corporal J. R. Male, Army Service Corps.
- 88643 Sergeant (acting Regimental Sergeant Major) C. T. F. Maber, Royal Horse Artillery.
- 7176 Sergeant (acting Squadron Quartermaster Sergeant) J. Mackenzie, Seaforth Highlanders.
- 11453 Quartermaster Sergeant J. Maguire, Manchester Regiment.
- 16072 Sergeant Instructor (acting Company Sergeant Major) P. R. Making, Royal Garrison Artillery.
- 240400 Sergeant A. E. Marks, Middlesex Regiment (formerly 2641).
- M2/019318 Private (acting Company Sergeant Major) H. Marsden, Army Service Corps.
- 12806 Battery Quartermaster Sergeant W. J. McCormack, Royal Field Artillery.
- 13217 Sergeant (acting Company Sergeant Major) W. E. A. McGowran, Royal Fusiliers Royal Garrison Artillery.
- RGA/15053 Quartermaster Sergeant (acting Sergeant Major) J. T. Mclntosh, Royal Artillery.
- 202469 Private G. S. McLeod, Scottish Rifles.
- 55038 Corporal J. McNaught, Royal Engineers.
- 35072 Sergeant-Major W. Mellor, Royal Army Medical Corps.
- S/1799 Quartermaster Sergeant R. Milne, Gordon Highlanders.
- 2815 Company Sergeant Major (acting Company Quartermaster Sergeant) W. W. Milne, Scots Guards, attached Royal Highlanders.
- S/8131 Sergeant (acting Quartermaster Sergeant) A. Mitchell, Rifle Brigade.
- 165194 Private F. A. Moore, Yeomanry (formerly 737).
- 315016 Sergeant J. S. Moore, Yeomanry (formerly 1557).
- 16262 Corporal T. H. Moore, Royal Flying Corps.
- 18/1012 Sergeant J. D. Moscrop, Durham Light Infantry.
- 300467 Sergeant H. W. Mundy, London Regiment.
- P/5143 Lance Corporal (acting Sergeant) W. L. Naylor, Military Foot Police.
- T/4/173253 Staff Sergeant Major G. Newbury, Army Service Corps.
- P/50 Lance Corporal (acting Sergeant) F. Noakes, Military Mounted Police.
- 1085 Flight Sergeant (acting Sergeant Major) M. O'Connor, Royal Flying Corps.
- 13297 Private W. Owens, Royal Inniskilling Fusiliers.
- 35098 Corporal (acting Sergeant) H. J. Parker, Royal Engineers.
- 1471 Staff Sergeant (acting Sergeant Major) J. W. Parkinson, Military Provost Staff Corps.
- 2435 Sergeant (Engineer Clerk) Acting Supervising Clerk F. A. Payne, Royal Engineers.
- S4/060101 Staff Quartermaster Sergeant T. M. Payne, Army Service Corps.
- 3458 Sergeant (acting Company Sergeant Major) J. W. Pearcey, Royal Engineers.
- 9040 Colour Sergeant (acting Company Sergeant Major) H. Pearson, Rifle Brigade.
- 4234 Flight Sergeant H. Peters, Royal Flying Corps.
- T/23056 Sergeant (acting Company Sergeant Major) N. Pike, Army Service Corps.
- S/18630 Staff Quartermaster Sergeant (acting Squadron Sergeant Major) T. Pollock, Army Service Corps.
- 29513 Corporal W. L. L. Powell, Royal Horse Artillery.
- 11527 Quartermaster Sergeant (acting Sergeant Major) T. C. Prewett, Royal Army Medical Corps.
- P/15 Corporal (acting Sergeant) F. Purchase, Military Mounted Police.
- 5345 Quartermaster Sergeant H. Quantrill, Norfolk Regiment.
- S/19371 Staff Sergeant (acting Squadron Sergeant Major) J. Quinn, Army Service Corps.
- 1005 Company Quartermaster Sergeant G. Ray, Royal Engineers.
- 3/7211 Sergeant (acting Quartermaster Sergeant) H. W. Reading, Devonshire Regiment.
- 88585 Mechanist Sergeant M. R. Redwood, Royal Engineers.
- 4625 Quartermaster Sergeant S. L. Richardson, Rifle Brigade.
- 950196 Battery Quartermaster Sergeant W. J. Richardson, Royal Field Artillery.
- 649 Sergeant (acting Regimental Quartermaster Sergeant) W. H. Riches, East Surrey Regiment.
- 4471 Colour Sergeant (acting Regimental Sergeant Major) F. Richings, Gloucestershire Regiment.
- 2/19771 Sergeant (acting Company Sergeant Major) A. Ridgeon, Army Service Corps.
- 26950 Sergeant H. H. Ridley, Royal Flying Corps.
- T/14913 Staff Sergeant Major (Acting 1st Class Staff Sergeant Major) F.J. Roberts, Army Service Corps.
- 16177 Sergeant Major A. F. Robinson, Royal Army Medical Corps.
- 9264 Sergeant E. N. Roots, Royal West Kent Regiment.
- 7202 Lance Corporal (Acting Sub-Commander) C. Rose, Army Ordnance Corps.
- 7078 Company Quartermaster Sergeant W. Round, Worcestershire Regiment.
- P/5543 Private (Acting Lance Corporal) W. Sandy, Military Mounted Police.
- L/24790 Acting Bombardier W. I. Scott, Royal Field Artillery.
- 13171 Company Sergeant Major W. Sharpe, Leicestershire Regiment.
- 3173 Quartermaster Sergeant (acting Superintending Clerk) H. G. Shaw, Scots Guards.
- 20011 Company Sergeant Major G. Silver, Machine Gun Corps.
- 70120 Corporal A. W. Skey, Royal Garrison Artillery.
- 142251 Sapper R. S. Smart, Royal Engineers.
- 28835 Lance Corporal H. Smith, Royal Engineers.
- M/22955 Company Sergeant Major J. Smith, Army Service Corps Ports.
- Ports./149629 Chief Petty Officer F. R. Smith, RNVR.
- RA/14171 Quartermaster Sergeant (acting Sergeant Major) W. F. J. Smith, Royal Artillery.
- 7721 Private (acting Sergeant) A. B. Spark, Gordon Highlanders.
- S/21660 Sergeant (acting Staff Sergeant) J. R. Spencer, Army Service Corps.
- 56810 Company Sergeant Major P. B. W. Stanley, Royal Engineers.
- 4250 Sapper J. Stansfield, Royal Engineers.
- 5196 Company Sergeant Major W. Statham, Machine Gun Corps.
- 98964 Battery Sergeant Major F. Stear, Royal Field Artillery.
- 5396 Company Sergeant Major Drill Sergeant (acting Regimental Sergeant Major) F. A. Stevens, Coldstream Guards.
- SS/5409 Staff Sergeant J. T. Stevens, Army Service Corps.
- 1198 Trooper W. Stevenson, North Irish Horse.
- S4/198989 Corporal J. R. Stewart, Army Service Corps.
- 230117 Company Sergeant Major L. F. Stone, London Regiment.
- Company Sergeant Major (acting Regimental Sergeant Major) R. Suckling, Royal Engineers.
- 21805 Sergeant A. F. Sutton, Royal Engineers.
- 825002 Battery Quartermaster Sergeant W. Swain, Royal Field Artillery.
- 22784 Corporal (Engineer Clerk) L. F. Taylor, Royal Engineers.
- 70422 Lance Corporal (Acting Corporal) J. O. Teare, Royal Engineers.
- 5444 Flight Sergeant W. Thomason, Royal Flying Corps.
- 51380 Sergeant Major C. J. Thompson, Royal Field Artillery.
- 8901 Acting Quartermaster Sergeant S. Thompson, Dorsetshire Regiment.
- 102359 Corporal (acting Sergeant) M. Thornton, Royal Engineers.
- 25709 Acting Regimental Sergeant Major O. Toal, Royal Field Artillery.
- CH/10268 Colour Sergeant B. G. Tomkins, Royal Marine Light Infantry.
- P/1170 Lance Corporal (acting Sergeant) A. Towers, Military Mounted Police.
- 12497 Sergeant (acting Superintending Clerk) W. B. Townend, Royal Engineers.
- 2507 Flight Sergeant C. Trevett, Royal Flying Corps.
- 22383 Acting Regimental Sergeant Major S. Tucker, Royal Welsh Fusiliers.
- 20300 Company Quartermaster Sergeant H. G. Tull, Machine Gun Corps.
- S/25152 Lance Corporal (acting Staff Sergeant) C. F. Turk, Army Service Corps.
- 14642 Lance Sergeant C. Turner, Royal Scots.
- T/18494 Sergeant (acting Squadron Sergeant Major) P. C. Turner, Army Service Corps.
- 230036 Sergeant F. A. Tyler, London Regiment.
- 9253 Acting Corporal A. Vickers, Yorkshire Light Infantry.
- 540586 Corporal (acting Sergeant) F. J. Wallis, Royal Engineers.
- 88382 Battery Sergeant Major J. P. Ward, Royal Field Artillery.
- SS/6545 Staff Sergeant Major W. Ward, Army Service Corps.
- T/18913 Sergeant (acting Company Sergeant Major) F. Warren, Army Service Corps.
- 428 Armament Staff Sergeant (acting Armament Sergeant Major) H. S. Watts, Army Ordnance Corps.
- Sub-Conductor A. Webb, Indian Ordnance Department.
- 70454 Company Quartermaster Sergeant R. J. C. Wheeler, Royal Engineers.
- 33299 Private J. R. Whisker, Royal Army Medical Corps.
- 21770 Sapper (Acting Corporal) H. Wilkinson, Royal Engineers.
- 1051 Armament Staff Sergeant A. Willetts, Army Ordnance Corps.
- 9949 Sergeant E. W. Wilson, Northamptonshire Regiment.
- S/19752 Staff Sergeant W. Woodason, Army Service Corps.
- 60121 Acting Bombardier J. A. Woodbridge, Royal Garrison Artillery.
- T/9223 Staff Sergeant Major (Acting 1st Class Staff Sergeant Major) A. J. Yates, Army Service Corps.
- S3/025613 Staff Sergeant S. J. Youngman, Army Service Corps.

Australian Imperial Force

- 988 Quartermaster Sergeant S. Bates, Infantry.
- 1618 Sergeant-Major H. G. Brain, Infantry.
- 2468 Staff Quartermaster Sergeant A. J. L. Daunt, H.Q., Australian Division.
- 6245 Acting Bombardier A. J. Grimshaw, Artillery.
- 961 Company Sergeant Major J. Harkness, Infantry.
- 80 Corporal J. H. Kortwright, Anzac Provost Corps.
- 1592 Company Sergeant Major E. J. Martin, Army Service Corps.
- 1039 Lance Sergeant F. R. Philpot, Infantry.
- 1146 Sergeant-Major (now 2nd Lieutenant) F. McK. Robertson, Engineers.
- 705 Sergeant H. C. Somerset, Engineers.
- 2910 Staff Sergeant S. A. Stanley, Army Medical Corps.
- 35 Sergeant-Major H. E. B. Thomas, Field Artillery.
- 452 Staff Sergeant L. Tweedie, H.Q, Infantry.
- 2367 Sergeant C. C. Walker, Boring and Mining Company.
- 5680 Sergeant H. H. Wilton, Army Service Corps.

Canadian Force

- 74164 Sergeant C. F. Airey, Infantry.
- 114286 Driver C. S. Althouse, Army Service Corps.
- 511483 Driver (acting Squadron Sergeant Major) A. Blatchford, Army Service Corps.
- 34713 Staff Sergeant G. L. Brodie, Army Service Corps.
- 30356 Company Sergeant Major J. J. Coull, Army Service Corps.
- 1664 Armourer Sergeant M. W. Davidson, Ordnance Corps.
- 67723 Sergeant J. A. Hunting, Infantry.
- 430179 Sergeant E. S. Keeling, Pioneer Battalion.
- 43145 Staff Sergeant Filter J. Lamb, Artillery.
- 77291 Sergeant S. McL. Norton, Infantry.
- 132137 Sergeant A. G. Ovenden, Infantry.
- 510216 Corporal J. J. Quittenton, Army Service Corps.
- 106559 Sergeant J. Smallman, Mounted Rifles.
- 219301 Sergeant R. Snelson, Infantry, attached Light Trench Mortar Battery.
- 1796 Company Sergeant Major O. O. Wilson, Army Service Corps.
- 73122 Private S. C. Wise, Infantry.

New Zealand Forces

- 9/667 Lance Corporal A. Briscoe, Pioneer Battalion.
- 10/1427 Staff Sergeant C. B. Burdekin.
- 8/595 Staff Sergeant Major G. B. Menzies.
- 4/1470 Sapper G. Seymour, Engineers.

=== Indian Order of Merit (IOM) ===
First Class

- Jemadar Ayub Khan, IOM, Bacluchis.

Second Class

- 3483 Acting Lance Daffadar Mahomad Hayat, Lancers, attached Machine Gun Squadron.
- 3600 Sowar Alia Ditta, Lancers, attached Machine Gun Squadron.
- 3107 Sowar Chandan Singh, Cavalry.
- 1041 Naik Natha Singh, Mountain Battery.
- 4469 Lance Naik Guljam Khan, Infantry.
- 4565 Sepoy Abdullah Khan, Infantry.
- Subadar Sarbuland, Infantry.
- Subadar Abdulla Khan, Infantry.
- 66 Havildar Jabar Khan, Infantry.
- Captain Naimat Ali Khan, Infantry.
- 2343 Naik Kehar Singh, Infantry
- 8963 Mangaringa, Indian Medical Service, Army Bearer Corps.
- 8595 Bam Din, Indian Medical Service, Army Bearer Corps.
- 1359 Sub-Assistant Surgeon 1st Class, Tanjore Ramasami Govindasami Pillai, Indian Subordinate Medical Department.
- 594 Sub-Assistant Surgeon 2nd Class, Arjandas Gosain, Indian Subordinate Medical Department, attached Pathans.

=== Indian Distinguished Service Medal (IDSM) ===
- 2318 Sowar Aesa Singh, Indian Cavalry.
- 1950 Acting Lance Dafadar Goordham, Indian Cavalry.
- 1863 Acting Lance Dafadar Karam Chand, Indian Cavalry.
- 1916 Sowar Yakub Khan, Cavalry.
- 2475 Dafadar Jot Ram, Cavalry, Indian Army.
- 2480 Sowar Channan Singh, Cavalry.
- 2135 Lance Dafadar Baz Khan, Cavalry.
- 2788 Dafadar Sham Singh, Cavalry.
- 3576 Lance Dafadar Bhagat Singh, Cavalry, attached Machine Gun Squadron.
- 13 Farrier Major Tika Ram, Cavalry.
- 441 Dafadar Mirza Muhammad Ali Beg, Cavalry.
- 3080 Dafadar Santokh Singh, Cavalry.
- 2207 Lance Dafadar Joth Ram, Cavalry.
- Risaldar Kabul Singh, Cavalry.
- 3079 Dafadar Sher Baz Khan, Cavalry.
- Risaldar Sattar Shah, Cavalry.
- 2146 Salutri Major Abdullah Khan, Cavalry.
- Jemadar Maqbul Shah, Cavalry.
- Jemadar Bahadur Singh, Cavalry.
- 2486 Lance Dafadar Nur Mohamed Khan, Cavalry.
- 2896 Lance Dafadar Hastam Khan, Cavalry.
- Jemadar Juma Khan, Cavalry.
- 874 Naik Narain Singh, Mountain Battery, Indian Army.
- 702 Havildar Shah Nawaz, Mountain Battery, Indian Army.
- 2352 Naik Shiugulam Singh, Sappers and Miners, Indian Army.
- Jemadar Kailas Singh, Sappers and Miners, Indian Army.
- 2636 Sepoy (Acting Naik) Ishmail Khan, Infantry.
- Jemadar Yakub Ali Khan, Infantry, Indian Army.
- Subadar Ali Bahadur Khan, Infantry, Indian Army.
- 1710 Havildar Niaz Muhammad Khan, Infantry, Indian Army.
- 1751 Sepoy (Acting Naik) Murad Ali Khan, Infantry, Indian Army.
- 3145 Sepoy Amanat Khan, Infantry, Indian Army.
- 1016 Lance Naik Alam Khan, Infantry.
- 1570 Lance Naik Gul Haidar, Infantry.
- Jemadar Hira Singh, Infantry.
- 2069 Havildar Bhagwan Singh, Infantry.
- 2073 Havildar Jagannathan, Infantry.
- 3009 Colour Havildar Saiyid Ahmed, Infantry.
- 398 Naik Haji Khan, Infantry.
- 453 Naik Sahib Jan, Infantry.
- 78 Kot Dafadar Firman Ali, Mule Corps.
- Captain Thakur Balu Singh, Camel Corps.
- 478 Dafadar Gajendra Singh, Cavalry.
- 569 Dafadar Major Syed Abdul Aziz, Infantry.
- 1140 Naik Hasan Hussain, Infantry.
- 1517 Sepoy Ganga Ram, Infantry.
- 762 Havildar Harman Singh, Infantry.
- 500 Naik Sawan Singh, Infantry.
- 1492 Sepoy Khiwan Singh, Infantry.
- Subadar Gurdit Singh. Infantry.
- Sub-Inspector Nadu Khan, Royal Engineers.
- Mohamed Bin Bakari, Overseer of Native Labour, Marine Transport Department.
