= Robert Anstruther =

Robert Anstruther may refer to:

- Robert Anstruther (soldier) (died 1583), Scottish soldier in the service of Mary, Queen of Scots
- Robert Anstruther (diplomat) (died 1645), Courtier and ambassador
- Sir Robert Anstruther, 1st Baronet (1658–1737), (additionally of Balcaskie, Fife and Braemore, Caithness in 1698) MP for Fife 1710
- Robert Anstruther (British Army colonel), of the 58th (Rutlandshire) Regiment of Foot (renumbered in 1757 from 60th Regiment of Foot) 1755–68
- Sir Robert Anstruther, 3rd Baronet (1733–1818), of the Anstruther baronets
- Robert Anstruther (MP) (1757–1832), MP for Anstruther Burghs 1793 to 1794
- Robert Anstruther (British Army officer) (1768–1809), Scottish general
- Sir Robert Anstruther, 5th Baronet (1834–1886), MP for Fife 1864–1880 and St. Andrews 1885–1886, Lord Lieutenant of Fife 1864–1886
- Robert Hamilton Anstruther (1862–1938), Royal Navy officer
- Robert Anstruther (cricketer) (1879–1945), Scottish first-class cricketer and soldier
