= John Anstruther =

John Anstruther may refer to:

- Sir John Anstruther, 1st Baronet (c. 1678–1753), Member of Parliament (MP) for Anstruther Easter Burghs 1708–1712 and 1713–1715 and Fife 1715–1741
- Sir John Anstruther, 2nd Baronet (1718–1799), MP for Anstruther Easter Burghs 1766–1780 and 1790–1793
- John Anstruther (British Army officer) (1736–1815), Scottish lieutenant-colonel
- Sir John Anstruther, 4th Baronet and 1st Baronet (1753–1811), MP for Anstruther Burghs 1783–1790, 1796–1797 and 1806–1811, for Cockermouth 1790–1796

== See also ==
- John Anstruther-Thomson (1776–1833), Scottish colonel
- Sir John Carmichael-Anstruther, 5th Baronet (1785–1818), known as John Anstruther until 1817, MP for Anstruther Easter Burghs 1811–1818
- John Anstruther-Thomson of Charleton and Carntyne (1818–1904), Scottish colonel
