= Windham Carmichael-Anstruther =

Windham Carmichael-Anstruther may refer to:

- Sir Windham Carmichael-Anstruther, 8th Baronet
- Sir Windham Carmichael-Anstruther, 9th Baronet of the Anstruther baronets
- Sir Windham Carmichael-Anstruther, 10th Baronet of the Anstruther baronets
- Sir Windham Carmichael-Anstruther, 11th Baronet of the Anstruther baronets
