= Ralph Anstruther (disambiguation) =

Ralph Anstruther (1921–2002) was a Scottish courtier.

Ralph Anstruther may also refer to:

- Sir Ralph Anstruther, 4th Baronet of the Anstruther baronets
- Sir Ralph Anstruther, 6th Baronet Lord Lieutenant of Fife
