= John Carmichael-Anstruther =

John Carmichael-Anstruther may refer to:

- Sir John Carmichael-Anstruther, 5th Baronet (1785–1818), known as John Anstruther until 1817, MP for Anstruther Easter Burghs 1811–1818
- Sir John Carmichael-Anstruther, 6th Baronet (1818–1831), shot dead at Eton College
