= Ian Anstruther =

English peer and history writer (1922–2007)

Sir Ian Fife Campbell Anstruther FSA
- Sir Ian Anstruther
- Born: May 11, 1922; Buckinghamshire, England
- Died: July 29, 2007 (aged 85); Barlavington, West Sussex, England
- Other names: 8th Baronet of Balcaskie; 13th Baronet of Anstruther
- Education: Eton College; New College, Oxford (Natural Sciences)
- Occupations: Writer; historian; landowner
- Known for: Hereditary Carver to the Sovereign in Scotland; Historian of 19th-century social and literary history; Benefactor of the London Library
- Spouses: Geraldine Horner (m. 1951; div. 1963) Susan Walker (m. 1963) Pornpan "Goy" Pinthwong (m. 1992)
- Children: 6, including Sebastian Anstruther
- Relatives: Douglas Tollemache Anstruther (father); Enid Campbell (mother); Jan Struther (aunt); Harry Anstruther (grandfather); George Douglas Campbell, 8th Duke of Argyll (maternal great-grandfather)
- Military career
- Allegiance: United Kingdom
- Branch: British Army
- Service years: 1939–1945
- Rank: Captain
- Units: Argyll and Sutherland Highlanders; Royal Corps of Signals
- Conflicts: Second World War

Sir Ian Fife Campbell Anstruther, of that Ilk, 8th Baronet of Balcaskie and 13th Baronet of Anstruther, Hereditary Carver of the Sovereign, Hereditary Master of the Royal Household in Scotland, Chief of the Name and Arms of Anstruther FSA (11 May 1922 – 29 July 2007) was a baronet twice over. He inherited substantial property interests in South Kensington and wrote several books on specialised areas of 19th-century social and literary history.

== Early life ==
Ian Anstruther was born in Buckinghamshire the younger son of Douglas Tollemache Anstruther and his first wife, Enid (née Campbell). His father was the son of Harry Anstruther, an MP, himself a younger son of another MP, Lieutenant Colonel Sir Robert Anstruther, 5th Baronet. His maternal grandfather was Lord George Campbell, younger son of the 8th Duke of Argyll.

His father served in the Army and then worked for the London and South Western Railway. His parents spent 14 years in divorce and then custody proceedings from 1924, and so he spent much of his youth with his mother's sister, Joan Campbell, at Strachur House in Argyllshire and her London house in Bryanston Square in London. His father's sister, aunt Joyce, better known as Jan Struther, created Mrs. Miniver.

== Education and military career ==
He was educated at Eton, and joined the Argyll and Sutherland Highlanders in 1939 when the Second World War broke out. An amateur radio ham, he was quickly transferred to the Royal Corps of Signals, and was commissioned, ending up as a captain. He read Natural Sciences at New College, Oxford, from 1940 to 1942, before returning to Catterick to train for the invasion of France. He landed with his brigade in Normandy three weeks after D-Day, and took charge of a team of signallers.

After the war, he chanced to meet Sir Archibald Clerk Kerr, a family friend, on a bus in London. Kerr (later 1st Baron Inverchapel) had been ambassador in Moscow during the war, and had just been appointed British ambassador to the United States; he asked Anstruther to become his private secretary. Anstruther readily agreed, and spent four years in America in the Diplomatic Service. He moved to Paris in 1951, to advance his ambition to become a writer.

Sir Ian was surprised to inherit an estate in South Kensington (including Thurloe Square and Alexander Square) from his aunt Joan in 1960, making him wealthy. He had bought a country estate at Barlavington, on the north of the South Downs near Petworth in West Sussex, in 1956, including 3,000 acres (12 km^{2}) of woodland, farmland and downland. He also bought a house near St. Tropez in 1973.

== Writing career ==
He wrote eight books, including I Presume (1956), a biography of the journalist H. M. Stanley; an account of the Eglinton tournament entitled The Knight and the Umbrella (1963); The Scandal of the Andover Workhouse (1973), exploring the iniquities of the workhouse system; a biography of Oscar Browning (1983), Coventry Patmore's Angel (1992), on Coventry Patmore and his wife Emily Augusta Patmore, the inspiration for the poem The Angel in the House; and a book about Sir Richard Broun, The Baronets' Champion (2006). He also wrote about Frederic William Farrar and his novel Eric, or, Little by Little.

Anstruther undertook much of his research in the London Library in St James's Square. He donated funding in 1992 to enable it to build a new wing, which was named the Anstruther Wing. He was a Fellow of the Society of Antiquaries, and a member of the Royal Company of Archers.

== Personal life ==
He met Geraldine Horner, elder daughter of Captain Gerald Stuart Blake, and they were married on 7 March 1951. They had one daughter Emily who later married Simon Crosby. The baronet was divorced in 1963, and he married the architect Susan Margaret Walker daughter of Colonel St John Bradling Paten on 15 November 1963. They had two sons and three daughters. The eldest Sir Sebastian inherited the title and estates in 2007. In 1992 he married a Thai woman, Pornpan Pinthwong known as Goy. Their first child, Maximillian was born in 1995. They still live on the Barlavington estate.

He enjoyed cars, owning an Aston Martin DB6, a Maserati, and several Porsches, but disliked excessive speed, and was occasionally stopped by the police for driving too slowly. He later traded down to a smart car.

He succeeded his cousin Sir Ralph Anstruther, 7th Baronet, in 2002, inheriting two Anstruther Baronetcies – of Nova Scotia, of Balcaskie (1694) and of Anstruther (1700). His cousin had been hereditary Carver to the Sovereign in Scotland, but the office passed instead to his second son, Toby. He also believed (almost certainly incorrectly) that he held the British baronetcy of Anstruther (1798), but its remainder (to "heirs-male of the body legitimately begotten" of the grantee) would have made it extinct on the death of Sir Windham Carmichael-Anstruther, 11th Baronet, in 1980, as most reference books, such as Burke and Debrett, have noted.

As an adult, he adhered to a fixed routine. He habitually wore a bow tie in the day, and a cravat in the evening. He walked each day in the South Downs, lunching at one of five village pubs during the week, always drinking ginger beer. He took tea at 5pm, and ate supper 8.30pm. He always dressed for dinner in a velvet suit and silk cravat, before his two Martinis. His family knew that matters were serious when he failed to dress for dinner a few weeks before his death.

== Death ==
Anstruther died at Barlavington. He was survived by his daughter from his first marriage, and two sons and three daughters from his second marriage. Due to differences between English law and Scottish law, one son, Sebastian (born prior to his parents' marriage), inherited the Scottish title, becoming 9th Baronet of Balcaskie and 11th Baronet of Anstruther (both being Nova Scotia or Scottish Baronetages). Obituaries to Sir Ian noted, erroneously, that the Great Britain Baronetcy of Anstruther (1798) had passed to his other son Toby (born after Sir Ian's second marriage). He left an estate valued in excess of £35,000,000.

== See also ==
- List of Fellows of the Society of Antiquaries of London

== Ancestry ==
Ancestors of Ian Anstruther

16. Sir Ralph Anstruther, 4th Baronet
8. Lt-Col. Sir Robert Anstruther, 5th Baronet
17. Mary Jane Torrens
4. Henry Torrens Anstruther
18.
9. Louisa Maria Chowne Marshall
19.
2. Sir Douglas Tollemache Anstruther
20. Thomas Hanbury-Tracy, 2nd Baron Sudeley
10. Charles Hanbury-Tracy, 4th Baron Sudeley
21. Emma Elizabeth Alicia Dawkins-Pennant
5. Hon. Eva Isabella Henrietta Hanbury-Tracy
22. Hon. Frederick James Tollemache
11. Ada Maria Katherine Tollemache
23. Isabella Anne Forbes
1. Sir Ian Fife Campbell Anstruther, 8th Bt
24. John Campbell, 7th Duke of Argyll
12. George Douglas Campbell, 8th Duke of Argyll
25. Joan Glassel
6. Lord George Granville Campbell
26. George Sutherland-Leveson-Gower, 2nd Duke of Sutherland
13. Lady Elizabeth Leveson-Gower
27. Hon. Harriet Howard
3. Enid Campbell
28.
14. James Brace Alexander
29.
7. Sybil Lascelles Alexander
30.
15.
31.

Baronetage of Nova Scotia
Preceded by Ralph Anstruther	Baronet (of Wrae, Linlithgowshire, Balcaskie, Fife & Braemore, Caithness); 2002–2007	Succeeded by Sebastian Paten; Campbell Anstruther
Preceded by Ralph Anstruther	Baronet (of Anstruther, Lanarkshire); 2002–2007	Succeeded by Sebastian Paten; Campbell Anstruther
