= Battle of Carrickfergus =

Battle of Carrickfergus may refer to:

- Battle of Carrickfergus (1597) during Tyrone's Rebellion
- Battle of Carrickfergus (1760) during the Seven Years' War
