= Clan Strange =

Lowland Scottish clan

- Motto: Dexter Dulce Quod Utile - 'That Which Is Useful Is Sweet

Chief
- Major Timothy Strange of Balcaskie
- Baron of Balcaskie

Clan Strange, also known as Clan Strang, is a Lowland Scottish clan.

== History ==
=== Origins of the clan ===
The surname Strange is more often found as Strang. It is probably derived from the Norman or French word etrange, which means foreign. The Strang rendering is believed to derive from the Scots dialect for the word strong.

In around 1255 Home le Estraunge was in the service of the Scottish king. In around 1340 Thomas de Strang held land around Aberdeen. In about 1362 John Strang married Cecilia, sister of Richard Anstruther of that Ilk and as part of the marriage settlement, Strang received some of the lands of Balcaskie.

=== 15th and 16th centuries ===
William Strang of Balcaskie is mentioned in around 1466 in deeds. In 1482 John Strang of Balcaskie received a charter of confirmation for the lands of Ewingston.

John Strang of Balcaskie was killed at the Battle of Pinkie Cleugh in 1547.

=== 17th and 18th centuries ===
In 1615 John Strang of Balcaskie sold the estate and became a colonel in Cochrane's Scots Regiment. Sir Robert Strange was descended from a younger son of the house of Balcaskie whose family had settled in Orkney at the time of the Scottish Reformation. Strange was intended for a career in the law, but instead took ship on a man-of-war heading for the Mediterranean. When he returned he took up the art of engraving.

==== Jacobite risings ====
The same Sir Robert Strange was appointed to Charles Edward Stuart's Life Guard when Stuart's army entered Edinburgh in 1745. Strange served in the Life Guard during the Jacobite rising of 1745 until after the defeat at the Battle of Culloden in 1746. After which he managed to escape for several months remaining as a fugitive in the Scottish Highlands. He later returned to Edinburgh in obscurity. He moved to London in 1751 where he began to receive critical acclaim for engraving several important historical prints. He left to tour Italy in 1760 and died in 1792, being considered the father of the art of engraving historical prints.

== Clan Strange Today ==
In February 1995 Major Timothy Strange of Balcaskie, Baron of Balcaskie was confirmed by Lord Lyon as Chief of the Clan Strange.

== Castles ==
Balcaskie in Fife was seat of John Strang who died at the Battle of Pinkie Cleugh in 1547, the property then passed to the Moncreiffs in 1615, then to Sir William Bruce in 1665 and then to the Anstruthers in 1698. Much of Strang's original interior of the building survives but it has since been altered and extended.

== Clan Profile ==
- Arms: Argent, a chevron between three lozenges Sable.
- Crest: Dexter, on a Wreath Argent and Sable a cluster of grapes Proper; sinister, on a Wreath Argent and Sable a castle Proper, masoned Sable
- Mottos: Dexter, Dulce quod utile (That which is useful is sweet); sinister, Stet fortuna domus (The good fortune of the house stands)
- Supporters: Dexter, an ancient Caledonian warrior; sinister, an ancient Danish warrior (a detailed description of the warriors is given in the Lyon Register)
- Standard: The arms in the hoist and of two tracts Argent and Sable with the Crest depicted thrice, and on two transverse bands Gules the Motto 'Dulce quod utile' in letters Or
- Pinsel: Argent, on a Wreath of the Liveries a cluster of grapes Proper within a strap Sable and buckle embellished Or and inscribed with the Motto 'Dulce quod utile' in letters of the field and all within a circlet Or fimbriated Gules bearing the title 'Strange of Balcaskie' in letters Sable, and in the fly on an Escrol Gules surmounting a cluster of grapes Proper the slogan 'A balcaskie' in letters of the Field.

== See also ==
- Scottish clan
