= Leonard Smelt =

Leonard Smelt may refer to:

- Leonard Smelt (politician) (c. 1683–1740), English politician
- Leonard Smelt (British Army officer) (c. 1719–1800)

== See also ==
- Smelt family
