= Alexander Campbell (British Army officer, died 1832) =

English politician (died 1832)

General Alexander Campbell (c. 1750 – 24 February 1832) of Monzie Castle, Perth was a British Army general and Member of Parliament.

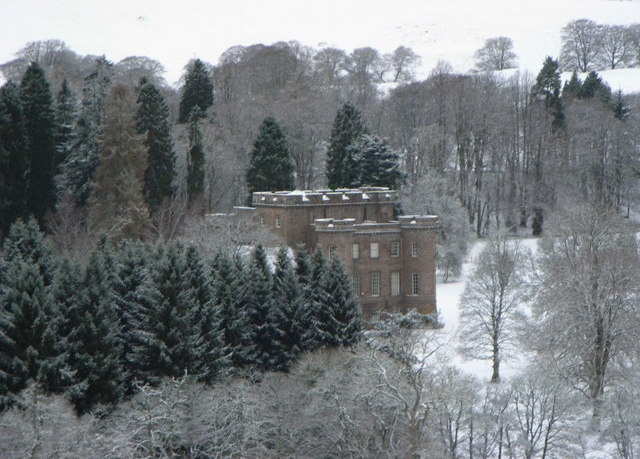
Monzie Castle, Perthshire

He was born the only son of Robert Campbell of Finab and Monzie, and Inverawe, Argyll, who was the MP for Argyll. He succeeded his father in 1790.

He joined the British Army in 1769 as an ensign in the 42nd Foot. He transferred as a lieutenant to the 2nd Royals in 1770 and as a captain to the 50th Foot and then the 62nd Foot in 1772. After serving as a major in the 74th Foot (1777) he was promoted lieutenant-colonel of the 62nd Foot in 1782 and the 3rd Foot Guards in 1789. He was made a colonel in the 116th Foot in 1794, and promoted major-general in 1795. He was colonel of the 7th West India regiment in 1796 and raised to lieutenant-general in 1802.

He was Colonel of the 13th Foot from 1804 to 1813, promoted full general in 1812 and transferred to be Colonel of the 32nd Foot from 1813 to his death. He served in the American War of Independence, as well as in Scotland, Ireland and Flanders, and in the West Indies in 1796.

In 1797 he was on the Army staff at Newcastle when he was returned to Parliament as the member for Anstruther Burghs. In 1807 he was elected to represent Stirling Burghs, sitting until 1818.

He died in 1832. He had married Christina Menzies and had one son: Alexander Campbell Cameron.

Military offices
Preceded by James Ogilvie	Colonel of the 32nd (Cornwall) Regiment of Foot; 1813–1832	Succeeded by Sir Samuel Venables Hinde
Preceded by George Ainslie	Colonel of the 13th (1st Somersetshire) Regiment of Foot; 1804–1813	Succeeded by Edward Morrison
Parliament of the United Kingdom
Preceded by Sir John Henderson, 5th Baronet	Member of Parliament for Stirling Burghs; 1807–1818	Succeeded by John Campbell
Preceded by Parliament of Great Britain	Member of Parliament for Anstruther Burghs; 1800–1806	Succeeded by Sir John Anstruther, 4th Baronet
Parliament of Great Britain
Preceded by Sir John Anstruther, 4th Baronet	Member of Parliament for Anstruther Burghs; 1797–1800	Succeeded by Parliament of the United Kingdom
