= 1892 Lanarkshire County Council election =

The second elections to Lanarkshire County Council were held on 6 December 1892 as part of the wider 1892 local elections.

There were only contests in 19 of the councils 66 divisions, with 47 members being returned unopposed. In two of the 19 divisions (Bishopbriggs and Overton) candidates (Sir William Hozier and David McLardy respectively) had been nominated without their consent, and withdrew their names. Hozier had prior to the election served as the councils Chairman.

== Council results ==
1892 Lanarkshire County Council election
Party	Seats	Gains	Losses	Net gain/loss	Seats %	Votes %	Votes	+/−
Independent	61							

== Electoral division results ==
=== Abington ===
Abington
Party	Candidate	Votes	%	±%
Independent	John Morton (farmer)	199		
Independent	Robert Paterson	150		
Independent hold		Swing		

=== Avondale ===
Avondale
Party	Candidate	Votes	%	±%
Independent	James Martin* (manufacturer)	461		
Independent	James Clark (banker)	308		
Independent hold		Swing		

=== Bellshill ===
Bellshill
Party	Candidate	Votes	%	±%
Independent	William Nelson* (banker)	unopposed		
Independent hold		Swing		

=== Biggar ===
Biggar
Party	Candidate	Votes	%	±%
Independent	James Dennistoun Mitchell*	unopposed		
Independent hold		Swing		

=== Biggar (Burgh) ===
Biggar (Burgh)
Party	Candidate	Votes	%	±%
Independent	Andrew Mitchell* (advocate)	unopposed		
Independent hold		Swing		

=== Bishopbriggs ===
Bishopbriggs
Party	Candidate	Votes	%	±%
Independent	Robert Turnbull* (architect)	124		
Independent	David McLardy (freeland)	64		
Independent hold		Swing		

=== Blackwood ===
Blackwood
Party	Candidate	Votes	%	±%
Independent	James Charles Hope*	unopposed		
Independent hold		Swing		

=== High Blantyre ===
High Blantyre
Party	Candidate	Votes	%	±%
Independent	John Craig*	unopposed		
Independent hold		Swing		

=== Bothwell ===
Bothwell
Party	Candidate	Votes	%	±%
Independent	John M. MacGregor (warehouseman)	420		
Independent	Francis Smith (cabinetmaker)	226		
Independent hold		Swing		

=== Cambuslang North ===
Cambuslang North
Party	Candidate	Votes	%	±%
Progressive	Dr Mungo Brown Turnbull* (M.D.)	unopposed		
Progressive hold		Swing		

=== Cambuslang South ===
Cambuslang South
Party	Candidate	Votes	%	±%
Independent	Alan Graham*	unopposed		
Independent hold		Swing		

=== Carluke East ===
Carluke East
Party	Candidate	Votes	%	±%
Independent	Alex Pillans* (draper)	unopposed		
Independent hold		Swing		

=== Carluke West ===
Carluke West
Party	Candidate	Votes	%	±%
Progressive	Dr Robert Stewart*	335		
Independent	William Cassels (farmer)	329		
Progressive hold		Swing		

=== Carnwath ===
Carnwath
Party	Candidate	Votes	%	±%
Independent	John Allison* (farmer)	unopposed		
Independent hold		Swing		

=== Dalzell ===
Dalzell
Party	Candidate	Votes	%	±%
Independent	Lord Hamilton*	Unopposed	N/A	N/A
Independent hold				

=== Douglas ===
Douglas
Party	Candidate	Votes	%	±%
Independent	John Pringle* (factor)	unopposed		
Independent hold		Swing		

=== East Kilbride ===
East Kilbride
Party	Candidate	Votes	%	±%
Independent	Robert Edward Stuart Harrington-Stuart*	unopposed		
Independent hold		Swing		

=== Forth ===
Forth
Party	Candidate	Votes	%	±%
Independent	Alexander Stewart* (farmer)	unopposed		
Independent hold		Swing		

=== Govan Bellahouston ===
Govan Bellahouston
Party	Candidate	Votes	%	±%
Independent	James Houston* (soapmaker)	unopposed		
Independent hold		Swing		

=== Govan Cessnock ===
Govan Cessnock
Party	Candidate	Votes	%	±%
Independent	William Hood (sailmaker)	unopposed		
Independent hold		Swing		

=== Govan Craigton ===
Govan Craigton
Party	Candidate	Votes	%	±%
Independent	James Purdie (joiner)	278		
Independent	Alex Sibhald	278		
Independent gain from Independent		Swing		

=== Govan Cross ===
Govan Cross
Party	Candidate	Votes	%	±%
Independent	Thomas Dykes (writer)	unopposed		
Independent hold		Swing		

=== Govan Fairfield ===
Govan Fairfield
Party	Candidate	Votes	%	±%
Independent	John Smeaton	219		
Independent	Thomas Daily (painter)	198		
Independent gain from Independent		Swing		

=== Govan Plantation North ===
Govan Plantation North
Party	Candidate	Votes	%	±%
Independent	James Stewart* (writer)	unopposed		
Independent hold		Swing		

=== Govan Broomloan ===
Govan Broomloan
Party	Candidate	Votes	%	±%
Progressive	John Milligan Fraser (wool manufacturer)	344		
Independent	Thomas Rowley (silk finisher)	271		
Progressive gain from Independent		Swing		

=== Govan South ===
Govan South
Party	Candidate	Votes	%	±%
Progressive	John Thomas Costigane* (warehouseman)	120		
Independent	William Brechin Faulds	118		
Progressive hold		Swing		

=== Govan Whitefield ===
Govan Whitefield
Party	Candidate	Votes	%	±%
Independent	Robert Falconer	unopposed		
Independent hold		Swing		

=== Hamilton ===
Hamilton
Party	Candidate	Votes	%	±%
Independent	Colin Dunlop* (ironmaster)	unopposed		
Independent hold		Swing		

=== Holytown ===
Holytown
Party	Candidate	Votes	%	±%
Independent	George Muirhead Russell* (grocer)	unopposed		
Independent hold		Swing		

=== Kinning Park First ===
Kinning Park, First
Party	Candidate	Votes	%	±%
Independent	William Fraser* (chainmaker)	unopposed		
Independent hold		Swing		

=== Kinning Park Second ===
Kinning Park, Second
Party	Candidate	Votes	%	±%
Independent	James Stewart*	unopposed		
Independent hold		Swing		

=== Kinning Park Third ===
Kinning Park, Third
Party	Candidate	Votes	%	±%
Independent	Robert Thomson* (dentist)	111		
Independent	William Burns (sack merchant)	82		
Independent hold		Swing		

=== Kinning Park Fourth ===
Kinning Park, Fourth
Party	Candidate	Votes	%	±%
Progressive	David Dreghorn* (draper)	unopposed		
Progressive hold		Swing		

=== Kirkfieldbank ===
Kirkfieldbank
Party	Candidate	Votes	%	±%
Independent	Thomas Watson	unopposed		
Independent gain from Independent		Swing		

=== Lesmahagow ===
Lesmahagow
Party	Candidate	Votes	%	±%
Independent	John Dick Scott*	unopposed		
Independent hold		Swing		

=== Lanark ===
Lanark
Party	Candidate	Votes	%	±%
Independent Liberal	Sir Windham Anstruther*	Unopposed	N/A	N/A
Independent Liberal hold				

=== Larkhall ===
Larkhall
Party	Candidate	Votes	%	±%
Independent	Robert Lambie* (draper)	unopposed		
Independent hold		Swing		

=== Motherwell Central ===
Motherwell Central
Party	Candidate	Votes	%	±%
Independent	John Grieve (engineer)	592		
Independent	John Wetherspoon Jnr. (accountant)	370		
Independent hold		Swing		

=== Motherwell North ===
Motherwell North
Party	Candidate	Votes	%	±%
Independent	Alex Findlay Jnr.	369		
Independent	William Buchanan (spirit dealer)	197		
Independent hold		Swing		

=== Newmains ===
Newmains
Party	Candidate	Votes	%	±%
Independent	James Houldsworth* (landowner)	unopposed		
Independent hold		Swing		

=== Partick South ===
Partick South
Party	Candidate	Votes	%	±%
Independent	George Green	452		
Independent	Peter Hutchson	389		
Independent gain from Independent		Swing		

=== Shettleston North ===
Shettleston North
Party	Candidate	Votes	%	±%
Independent	Thomas Begg (house factor)	293		
Independent	George John Miller	286		
Independent gain from Independent		Swing		

=== Shettleston South ===
Shettleston South
Party	Candidate	Votes	%	±%
Independent	John Wilson (merchant)	290		
Independent	John Laird (auctioneer)	233		
Independent gain from Independent		Swing		

=== Stonefield ===
Stonefield
Party	Candidate	Votes	%	±%
Independent	George Whyte* (merchant)	unopposed		
Independent hold		Swing		

=== Overton ===
Overton
Party	Candidate	Votes	%	±%
Independent	David Frew (grocer)	172	93.99	
Independent	Sir William Hozier*	11	6.01	
Majority		161	87.98	N/A
Turnout		183		
Independent gain from Independent		Swing		

=== Stonehouse & Glassford ===
Stonehouse & Glassford
Party	Candidate	Votes	%	±%
Independent	William Sum (coal master)	349		
Independent	Robert Natsmith (merchant)	290		
Independent hold		Swing		

=== Uddingston ===
Uddingston
Party	Candidate	Votes	%	±%
Independent	William Barr*	unopposed		
Independent hold		Swing		

=== Wishaw East ===
Wishaw East
Party	Candidate	Votes	%	±%
Independent	Walter James Houldsworth (ironmaster)*	505		
Independent	John Keir	267		
Independent hold		Swing		

=== Wishaw West ===
Wishaw West
Party	Candidate	Votes	%	±%
Independent	Thomas Bell	443		
Independent	William Thomson (accountant)	303		
Independent hold		Swing		
