= John Anstruther (British Army officer) =

Colonel John Anstruther (13 May 1736 – 10 February 1815) was a Scottish military officer.

He was the son of Sir Philip Anstruther, 2nd Baronet of Balcaskie and Catherine Hay.

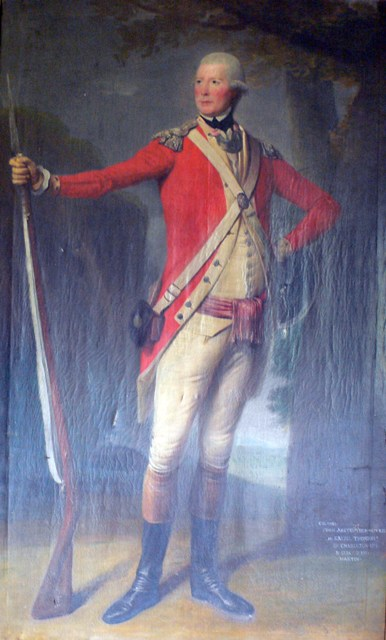
Lieutenant-Colonel John Anstruther, by David Martin

In 1776 he took over as Colonel in Chief of the 62nd Regiment of Foot following the death of Lt Gen William Strode. He then went with the regiment to Canada as part of the ongoing campaign there.

He married Grizel Maria Thomson of Charleton, Fife, daughter of John Thomson of Charleton and Margaret Paterson, in December 1774.

== Children ==
- John Anstruther-Thomson (15 April 1776 – 10 April 1833)
- He also had two daughters and three younger sons, who all died without children.
