= William Smelt =

William Smelt may refer to:

- William Smelt (politician) (1690–1755), English politician, MP for Northallerton
- William Smelt (British Army officer) (1788–1858)
