= William Strode (British Army officer) =

British Army officer (1698–1776)

William Strode (1698 – 14 January 1776) was a British Army officer. He was colonel-in-chief of the 62nd Regiment of Foot from 1758 until his death in 1776.

== Life ==
He joined the British Army in 1716.

Upon the creation of the 62nd Regiment of Foot in 1758, he was appointed its first Colonel-in-chief.

In 1760, alongside Lieutenant-colonel John Jennings, he was responsible for the defence of Carrickfergus Castle, which was attacked on 23 February by a French force of 600 men. In 1763, he was posted with his regiment to the West Indies before joining William Howe in Canada.

In 1770, he paid for the erection of a monument to the Duke of Cumberland in Cavendish Square. The statue was removed from its pedestal during the Second World War, and has since been lost.

In 1772, he was based with his regiment in Oughterard in western Ireland. In July 1773, he moved to Dublin, and in August 1774 to Cork. In July 1775, he briefly moved to Ballyshannon before being posted in Ballinroabe. In October 1775, he returned to Ballyshannon, where he was joined by Lt Col John Anstruther.

In 1772, he was court-martialled for failing to adequately clothe his regiment. He was acquitted but asked to reimburse any soldiers who had paid for their own uniforms.

On 31 December 1775, he was posted to Galway, where he died on 14 January 1776. His body was returned to England, and he was buried in the nave of Westminster Abbey the supreme accolade. His tomb was designed by Richard Hayward.

Valentine Jones became Colonel-in-Chief following Strode's death, and the regiment was subsequently reposted to North America to fight in the American Revolutionary War.
