= Alexander Anstruther =

Alexander Anstruther may refer to:

- Alexander Anstruther (cricketer) (1846–1902), Indian-born Scottish cricketer
- Alexander Anstruther (judge) (1769–1819), Scottish judge in India
