= Philip Anstruther =

Philip Anstruther may refer to:

- Philip Anstruther (British Army officer) (died 1760), MP for Anstruther Burghs 1715–1741, and 1747–1754
- Sir Philip Anstruther, 2nd Baronet (died 1765)
- Sir Philip Anstruther-Paterson, 3rd Baronet (1752–1808), known until 1782 as Philip Anstruther, MP for Anstruther Burghs from 1774 to 1777
- Philip Anstruther (colonial secretary) (1802–1863), Colonial Secretary of Ceylon from 1833 to 1845
