= James Fergusson (British Army officer) =

British Army officer and Governor of Gibraltar

General Sir James Fergusson GCB
- Born: 17 March 1787; Cork, Ireland
- Died: 4 September 1865 (aged 78); Bath, Somerset
- Military career
- Allegiance: United Kingdom
- Branch: British Army
- Rank: General
- Conflicts: Crimean War
- Awards: Knight Grand Cross of the Order of the Bath

General Sir James Fergusson, GCB (17 March 1787 – 4 September 1865) was a British Army officer during the Napoleonic Wars and the Governor of Gibraltar from 1855 to 1859.

== Military career ==
Born on 17 March 1787 to Charles and Ann Fergusson, Fergusson was commissioned as ensign in 1801, in the 18th (Royal Irish) Regiment of Foot, before transferring to the 43rd (Monmouthshire) Regiment of Foot, training as light infantry under Sir John Moore at Shorncliffe. Promoted lieutenant in 1804, and captain in 1806, he served in the Light Division throughout the Peninsular War. Fergusson was present at the battles of Roliça, Vimeiro, (where he sustained wounds), and Corunna, where his regiment formed part of the reserve. Fergusson accompanied the 43rd on the 1809 Walcheren Expedition before returning to the Peninsula, experiencing action at River Côa, Bussaco, Sabugal, Fuentes de Onoro, as well as Ciudad Rodrigo and Badajoz, where he formed part of the 43rd's storming parties, receiving wounds both times. He received a gold medal for his action at Badajoz. Following fine action at Salamanca in 1812 he was promoted to Major without purchase, taking a post in the 79th Foot. He exchanged into the 85th Foot, seeing action at Bidassoa, Nivelle, Nive and Bayonne.

On 16 May 1814 Fergusson was again promoted without purchase, becoming lieutenant-colonel of the 3rd (Buffs) Regiment's 2nd battalion. Following the Buffs' reduction in 1816, Fergusson studied at the Royal Military College, before taking an appointment as lieutenant-colonel of the 88th Regiment of Foot. In 1825, Fergusson exchanged into the 52nd (Oxfordshire) Regiment of Foot, commanding it in England, Ireland, Nova Scotia, Gibraltar, and the West Indies, until 1839, receiving his promotion to full colonel in 1830. In 1841, Fergusson was made major-general, and served as colonel of the 62nd Regiment of Foot (March 1850), of his old regiment the 43rd Foot (1850–1853); then made lieutenant-general, he commanded the troops at Malta, and in 1855 the governor and commander-in-chief at Gibraltar. He resigned from the post in 1859, retiring to Bath. He was promoted to full general on 21 February 1860.

Fergusson was invested as a Companion of the Order of the Bath in 1831, Knight Commander in 1855 and Knight Grand Cross in 1860. He was also awarded the Military General Service Medal with eight clasps.

Fergusson died in 1865.

== Notes ==
Government offices
Preceded by Sir Robert Gardner	Governor of Gibraltar; 1855–1859	Succeeded by Sir William Codrington
Military offices
Preceded by Hercules Robert Pakenham	Colonel of the 43rd (Monmouthshire) Regiment of Foot; 1850–1865	Succeeded by Sir Frederick Love
Preceded by John Forster FitzGerald	Colonel of the 62nd (Wiltshire) Regiment of Foot; 1850	Succeeded by William Smelt
