= Robert Anstruther (cricketer) =

Scottish cricketer and soldier (1879–1945)

Personal information
- Full name: Robert Abercrombie Anstruther
- Born: 3 August 1879; Armagh, Ireland
- Died: 27 August 1945 (aged 66); Carnbee, Fife, Scotland
- Relatives: Alexander Anstruther (uncle)

Domestic team information
- Years: Team
- 1910/11: Europeans

Career statistics
Competition	First-class
Matches	1
Runs scored	11
Batting average	5.50
100s/50s	0/0
Top score	7
Balls bowled	96
Wickets	2
Bowling average	36.50
5 wickets in innings	0
10 wickets in match	0
Best bowling	2/73
Catches/stumpings	0/–
- Source: Cricinfo, 13 May 2023

Robert Abercrombie Anstruther DSO (3 August 1879 — 27 August 1945) was an Irish-born Scottish first-class cricketer and British Army officer.

The son of the Scottish soldier Philip Robert Anstruther, he was born in Ireland at Armagh in August 1879. He was commissioned into the British Army from the Royal Military Academy as a second lieutenant in June 1898. He served with the Royal Field Artillery during the Second Boer War, being promoted to lieutenant during the conflict in February 1901. He was later promoted to captain in November 1905. Whilst serving in British India, Anstruther made a single appearance in first-class cricket for the Europeans cricket team against the Parsees at Deccan in the 1910–11 Bombay Presidency Match. Batting twice in the match, he was dismissed for 4 runs opening the batting by Jehangir Warden, whilst following-on in their second innings he was dismissed for 7 runs by M. B. Vatcha. With the ball, he took the wickets of D. D. Driver and Rustomji Meherhomji in the Parsees first innings, for the cost of 73 runs from 16 overs.

In the military, Anstruther served in the First World War with the 40th Brigade Royal Field Artillery, being mentioned in dispatches in October 1914. In the same month as his dispatches mention, he was promoted to major. Whilst part of the British Salonika Army opposing Bulgarian advances on the Macedonian front, Anstruther was again mentioned in dispatches, and was later made a Companion of the Distinguished Service Order in the 1917 Birthday Honours. Following the war, he was placed on the half-pay list on account of ill health in August 1920 and retired in August 1921. Anstruther died at his home in Carnbee in Scotland on 27 August 1945. His uncle, Alexander Anstruther, was also a first-class cricket. He was also a cousin to Sir Ralph Anstruther, the 6th Baronet of the Anstruther baronets.
