= Clan Anstruther =

Scottish clan

- Crest: Two arms in armour holding a pole-axe with both hands gauntleted Proper
- Motto: Periissem ni periissem (I would have perished had I not persisted)

Profile
- Region: Lowlands
- District: Fife

Chief
- Tobias Alexander Anstruther of that Ilk
- Chief of the Name and Arms of Anstruther
- Seat: Balcaskie House.

Clan Anstruther is a Scottish clan.

== History ==
=== Origin of name ===
The clan originated from the town of Anstruther, which was adopted as a familial name. The name is Gaelic in origin: "an" (the) + "sruthair" (little stream).

=== Origins of the clan ===
Alexander I of Scotland granted the lands of Anstruther to William de Candela in the early 12th century. There are a number of suggested origins for William but research points to the Normans in Italy. It is known that William I of England sought assistance from William, Count of Candela, who sent his son. It is likely that this son was William de Candela, who received the grant of land from Alexander.

William de Candela's son, also William, was a benefactor to the monks of Balmerino Abbey. The site now occupied by the Scottish Fisheries Museum in Anstruther was a gift from William. The next generation of the family, Henry, no longer styled himself, de Candela, being described as 'Henricus de Aynstrother dominus ejusdem' in a charter confirming grants of land to Balmerino Abbey.

Henry Anstruther accompanied Louis IX of France to the crusades and swore fealty to King Edward I of England in 1292 and again in 1296.

=== 15th and 16th centuries ===
In 1483, Andrew Anstruther of Anstruther confirmed the right to a barony and fought against the English at the Battle of Flodden in 1513 during the Anglo-Scottish Wars. Andrew Anstruther married Christina Sandilands who was descended from Princess Jean or Joanna, daughter of Robert II of Scotland. His second son, David, fought at the Battle of Pavia in 1520 in the service of Francis I of France in the French Scots Regiment. This line ended with the death of the last Baron d'Anstrude in 1928.

Andrew's great-great-grandson, Sir James Anstruther was chosen as a companion to the young James VI of Scotland, who appointed him Hereditary Grand Carver, a title still held by the head of the family today. In 1595 he became Master of the Household.

=== 17th century and the Civil War ===
William, the elder son of Sir James Anstruther, accompanied Sir James to London following the Union of the Crowns in 1603 where he was made a Knight of the Order of the Bath. Sir James's second son, Sir Robert, served as a diplomat for both James I and Charles I.

Sir Phillip Anstruther, the second son of Sir Robert fought as a royalist during the civil war, and received Charles II at Dreel Castle after his coronation at Scone in 1651. Phillip Anstruther was later taken prisoner after the Battle of Worcester in 1651. He was excluded from Cromwell's Act of Grace and his estates were confiscated. They were restored to him after the restoration of the monarchy by Charles II. Phillip's brother Sir Alexander Anstruther married the Hon. Jean Leslie, daughter of the General David Leslie, Lord Newark.

== Clan chief ==
The Chief of Clan Anstruther is Tobias Alexander Campbell Anstruther of that Ilk and of Balcaskie, younger son of Sir Ian Anstruther.

== Clan castles ==
The clan chief's seat remains at Balcaskie in Fife which was probably built in around 1670 by Sir William Bruce. Airdrie House and Newark Castle in Fife also belong to the Anstruthers.

== Clan profile ==
- Arms: Argent, three piles issuing from the chief sable
- Crest: Two arms in armour holding a pole-axe with both hands gauntleted Proper
- Motto: Periissem ni periissem (I would have perished had I not persisted)

== See also ==
- Anstruther baronets
