= Sir Robert Anstruther, 3rd Baronet =

Scottish advocate and landowner

Sir Robert Anstruther, 3rd Baronet of Balcaskie, Fife (April 1733 – 2 August 1818) was a Scottish advocate and landowner.

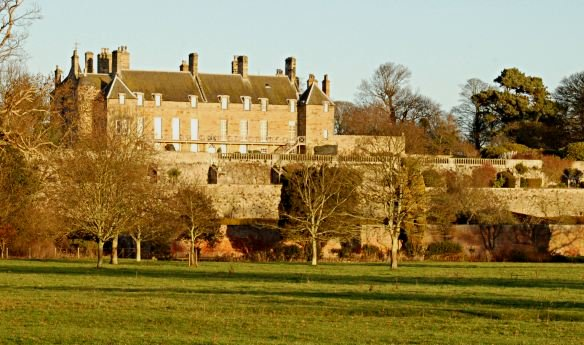
Balcaskie, Fife

He was the eldest son of the advocate Sir Philip Anstruther, 2nd Baronet of Balcaskie, whom he succeeded in 1763. He was an advocate and a principal Clerk to the Bills.

He was married to Lady Janet, the daughter of Alexander Erskine, 5th Earl of Kellie.

They are buried in Abercrombie Old Chapelyard in Fife with many other family members.

Their eldest son, Brigadier-General Robert Anstruther, died in the Peninsular War and the baronetcy and Balcaskie passed down to Roberts's son, Sir Ralph Abercromby Anstruther, 4th Baronet.

Baronetage of Nova Scotia
Preceded by Philip Anstruther	Baronet (of Wrae, Balcaskie, Fife and Braemore); 1763–1818	Succeeded by Ralph Anstruther
