= Williams baronets of Bodelwyddan (1798) =

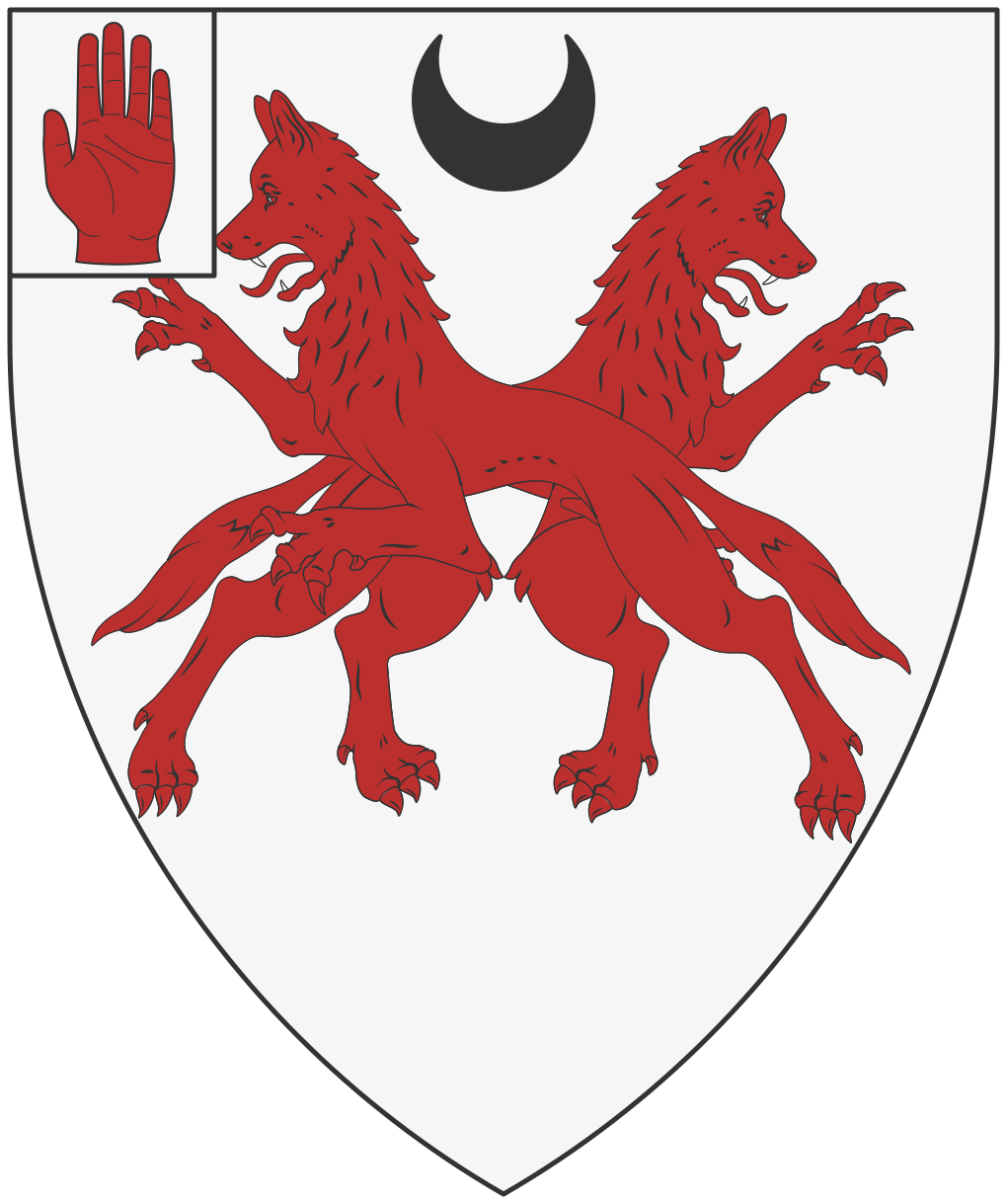
Escutcheon of the Williams baronts of Bodelwyddan

The Williams baronetcy, of Bodelwyddan in the County of Flint, was created in the Baronetage of Great Britain on 24 July 1798 for John Williams. He had previously served as High Sheriff of Flintshire. He was the son of Bennet(t) Williams of Bridge House, Chester, related to Kyffin Williams of Bodelwyddan, Member of Parliament for Flint Boroughs, who married Sarah Hesketh, daughter of Roger Hesketh and the heiress Margaret Fleetwood; Bennet Williams was son of John Williams, second son of Sir William Williams, 1st Baronet of the Williams-Wynn Baronets, landowners in North Wales.

The 2nd Baronet assumed in 1842 the additional surname of Hay but died without male issue; he was succeeded by his brother Hugh. The title became extinct on the death of the 9th Baronet in 2018.

== Williams baronets, of Bodelwyddan (1798) ==
- Sir John Williams, 1st Baronet (1761–1830)
- Sir John Hay-Williams, 2nd Baronet (1794–1859)
- Sir Hugh Williams, 3rd Baronet (1802–1876)
- Sir William Grenville Williams, 4th Baronet (1844–1904)
- Sir William Willoughby Williams, 5th Baronet (1888–1932)
- Sir Hugh Grenville Williams, 6th Baronet (1889–1961)
- Sir Reginald Lawrence William Williams, 7th Baronet (1900–1971)
- Sir Francis John Watkin Williams, 8th Baronet (1905–1995)
- Sir Lawrence Hugh Williams, 9th Baronet (1929–2018), who left no male heir.

== Notes ==
Baronetage of Great Britain
Preceded by Anstruther baronets	Williams baronets of Bodelwyddan; 24 July 1798	Succeeded by Dallas baronets
