= Ralph Anstruther =

Scottish British Army officer and courtier

Sir Ralph Anstruther, Bt
- Born: 13 June 1921
- Died: 19 May 2002 (aged 80)
- Military career
- Allegiance: United Kingdom
- Branch: British Army
- Service years: 1941–1950
- Rank: Major
- Service number: 219057
- Unit: Coldstream Guards
- Conflicts: Second World War
- Awards: Knight Grand Cross of the Royal Victorian Order; Military Cross; Mentioned in Dispatches

Major Sir Ralph (Hugo) Anstruther, 7th Baronet GCVO MC DL (13 June 1921 – 19 May 2002) was a Scottish British Army officer and courtier.

== Early life ==
The only son of Captain Robert Edward Anstruther MC of the Black Watch, only son of Sir Ralph William Anstruther, 6th Baronet, and Marguerite Blanche Lily de Burgh, he was educated at Eton and at Magdalene College, Cambridge.

== Career ==
He commissioned into the Coldstream Guards on 29 November 1941, and was awarded the Military Cross in 1943. He later served in Malaya in 1950, and was mentioned in despatches. He was Equerry to Queen Elizabeth the Queen Mother from 1959 to 1998, and Treasurer from 1961 to 1998. He was made a Commander of the Royal Victorian Order in 1967, and promoted to KCVO in 1976 and GCVO in 1992.

He was also a Member of the Royal Company of Archers and Deputy Lieutenant of Fife from 1960 to 1997 and of Caithness from 1965.

== Titles ==
He succeeded his grandfather in 1934 to the baronetcy of Anstruther of Balcaskie, and in 1980 succeeded his cousin, Sir Windham Eric Francis Carmichael-Anstruther, 8th Baronet, to the baronetcy of Anstruther of Anstruther. With the latter he also became Hereditary Carver to the Queen. He was succeeded to the baronetcies by his cousin Ian Anstruther.

== Ancestry ==
Ancestors of Ralph Anstruther

16. Ralph Abercrombie Anstruther
8. Col. Sir Robert Anstruther of Balcaskie, 5th Bt
17. Lucy C Hamilton
4. Sir Ralph William Anstruther of Balcaskie 6th Bt
18. Rev. William Knox Marshall
9. Louisa Maria Chowne Marshall
19. Louisa Marsh
2. Robert Edward Anstruther
20.
10. Edward Hussey
21.
5. Mildred Harriet Hussey
22. Hon. Robert Henry Clive
11. Henrietta Sarah Windsor-Clive
23. Harriet, Windsor, Baroness Windsor
1. Maj. Sir Ralph Hugo Anstruther of Balcaskie 7th Bt
24. Thomas John Burgh
12. Thomas de Burgh
25. Anna Louisa Hely-Hutchinson
6. Hugo de Burgh
26. Maj. Thomas Campbell-Graham
13. Jane Campbell-Graham
27.
3. Marguerite de Burgh
28.
14. James Beaumont
29.
7. Mabel Patty Beaumont
30.
15.
31.

Baronetage of Nova Scotia
Preceded by Ralph Anstruther	Baronet (of Wrae, Linlithgowshire and Balcaskie, Fife and Braemore, Caithness); 1934–2002	Succeeded by Ian Anstruther
Preceded by Windham Carmichael-Anstruther	Baronet (of Anstruther, Carmichael and Westeraw, Lanarkshire); 1980–2002	Succeeded by Ian Anstruther
