= William Smelt (British Army officer) =

British Army officer (c. 1788–1858)

Lieutenant-General William Smelt CB

18th General Officer Commanding, Ceylon
- In office 28 January 1847 – 1852
- Preceded by: Colin Campbell
- Succeeded by: P. Bainbrigge

Personal details
- Born: Gedling, Nottinghamshire

Military service
- Allegiance: United Kingdom
- Branch/service: British Army
- Rank: Lieutenant-General
- Commands: General Officer Commanding, Ceylon

Lieutenant-General William Smelt, CB (c. 1788 – 10 January 1858) was the 18th General Officer Commanding, Ceylon. He was a member of the Smelt family.

He joined the British Army as a Cornet in 1798. In 1814, as a Major of the 103rd Foot, he participated in the battles of Plattsburg, Oswego and Lundy's Lane in North America and was badly wounded at the Siege of Fort Erie.

He was awarded CB in 1826, when a Lieutenant-Colonel of the 41st Foot. He was appointed General Officer Commanding, Ceylon on 28 January 1847 and succeeded by P. Bainbrigge in 1852. He was awarded the Army of India Medal.

In 1850 he was given the colonelcy of the 62nd (Wiltshire) Regiment of Foot but transferred in 1851 to the 37th Foot, a position he held until his death. He was promoted Lieutenant-General on 11 November 1851.

Military offices
Preceded by Colin Campbell	General Officer Commanding, Ceylon; 1847–1852	Succeeded by P. Bainbrigge
Preceded by Sir Alexander Duff	37th (North Hampshire) Regiment of Foot; 1851–1858	Succeeded by John Fraser
Preceded by Sir James Fergusson	62nd (Wiltshire) Regiment of Foot; 1850–1851	Succeeded by Thomas Lightfoot
