= Battle of Carrickfergus (1760) =

1760 battle of the Seven Years' War

- Part of the Seven Years' War
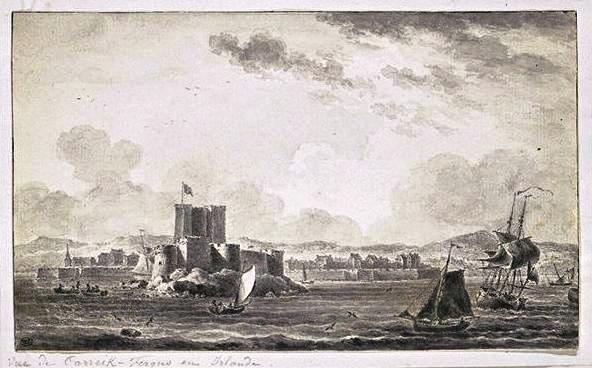
- 18th-century illustration of Carrickfergus Castle
Date	21–26 February 1760
Location	Carrickfergus, County Antrim 54.71345°N 5.80629°W
Result	French victory

Belligerents
France	Great Britain

Commanders and leaders
François Thurot	John Jennings

Strength
600	200

Casualties and losses
36-60 killed	3-4 killed

The Battle of Carrickfergus took place in February 1760 in Carrickfergus, County Antrim during the Seven Years' War. A force of 600 Frenchmen led by François Thurot landed near the town, overwhelmed its small garrison of 200 soldiers of the 62nd Regiment of Foot under Lieutenant-colonel John Jennings, and captured Carrickfergus Castle.

When word of the capture reached Dublin, a small force of dragoons was despatched by the Lord Lieutenant John Russell, 4th Duke of Bedford who feared, incorrectly, that it was a feint to draw British forces to the north while a main French force was to attack Cork or Dublin. Therefore, the bulk of the Irish Army remained where it was rather than marching to the assistance of Ulster.

Thurot held the town for five days, menacing nearby Belfast and demanding supplies and a ransom. In the face of the mobilisation of large numbers of local militia under General William Strode, and the appearance of a Royal Navy squadron off the coast, Thurot re-embarked his force and departed the town.

Thurot was subsequently killed during the Battle of Bishops Court, but his feat in landing on enemy soil was widely hailed in France and he became a national hero, partly because his perceived daring was in sharp contrast to the incompetence shown by French naval officers at the recent Battle of Quiberon Bay.

== See also ==
- Great Britain in the Seven Years War
- France in the Seven Years War
