= Dallas baronets =

The Dallas baronetcy, of Upper Harley Street in the County of Middlesex, was a title in the Baronetage of Great Britain. It was created on 31 July 1798 for George Dallas, who had earlier been in the service of the East India Company. The title was granted for his work as a pamphleteer, defending the Pitt administration's Irish policy. He was the son of the London insurance broker Robert Dallas (died 1796). In 1800 he was elected Member of Parliament for Newport (Isle of Wight).

The title became extinct on the death of the 3rd Baronet in 1918.

== Dallas baronets, of Harley Street (1798) ==
- Sir George Dallas, 1st Baronet (1758–1833)
- Sir Robert Charles Dallas, 2nd Baronet (1804–1874), educated Oriel College, Oxford, and Lincoln's Inn, President of the Oxford Union in 1824, and became a barrister.
- Sir George Edward Dallas, 3rd Baronet (1842–1918), Chief Clerk of the Foreign Office, left no heir. He was survived by his widow Felicia Mary née Welby, died 1940.

== Extended family ==
Sir Robert Dallas, Chief Justice of the Common Pleas, was the elder brother of the 1st Baronet.

== Arms ==
Coat of arms of Dallas baronets
Crest A crescent quarterly Or and Gules Escutcheon Argent a bend Azure between three mullets Sable. Motto Lux Venit Ab Alto (Light Comes From On High)

Baronetage of Great Britain
Preceded by Williams baronets	Dallas baronets of Harley Street; 31 July 1798	Succeeded by Callander baronets
