= Sir Windham Carmichael-Anstruther, 8th Baronet =

Scottish baronet and politician

Sir Windham Charles James Carmichael-Anstruther, 8th Baronet and 4th Baronet DL (1825 – 26 January 1898) was a Liberal Party politician and Scottish baronet.

Born in Lincoln's Inn Fields, he was the son of Sir John Anstruther, 4th Baronet and his wife, daughter of Edward Brice. In 1831, he succeeded his nephew Windham in two baronetcies. Carmichael-Anstruther was appointed a deputy lieutenant of Lanarkshire in 1846 and became major of the Lanarkshire County Militia. He served as Member of Parliament (MP) for Southern Lanarkshire from 1874 until his defeat at the 1880 general election.

In 1824, he married firstly the second daughter of Charles Wetherell. She died in 1841 and Carmichael-Anstruther married secondly the youngest daughter of Allan Williamson Grey later in that year.

Parliament of the United Kingdom
Preceded by John Glencairn Carter Hamilton	Member of Parliament for Southern Lanarkshire; 1874 – 1880	Succeeded by John Glencairn Carter Hamilton
Baronetage of Nova Scotia
Preceded by Windham Carmichael-Anstruther	Baronet (of Anstruther); 1869–1898	Succeeded by Windham Carmichael-Anstruther
Baronetage of Great Britain
Preceded by Windham Carmichael-Anstruther	Baronet (of Fort William); 1869–1898	Probably extinct
