= Sir Philip Anstruther, 2nd Baronet =

Scottish advocate and landowner

Sir Philip Anstruther, 2nd Baronet of Balcaskie, Fife (1688 – 27 May 1763) was a Scottish advocate and landowner.

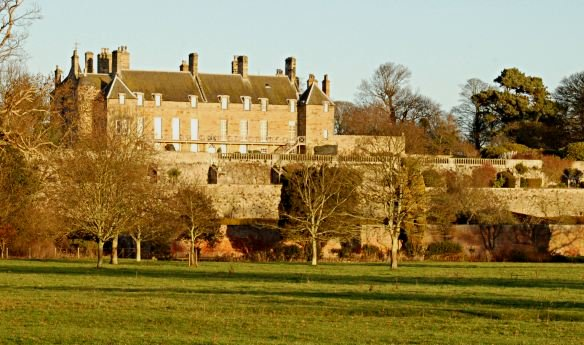
Balcaskie, Fife

He was the eldest son of Sir Robert Anstruther, 1st Baronet, a member of the parliaments of both Scotland and Great Britain. He succeeded his father to the baronetcy and Balcaskie in 1737.

He studied law, was admitted to the Faculty of Advocates in 1711 and was appointed a principal Clerk to the Bills.

He married Catherine, the daughter of Lord Alexander Hay of Spott, Haddingtonshire, with whom he had 7 sons. She died at Balcaskie, 11 February 1759.

He died 27 May 1763 and is memorialized in Abercrombie Old Chapelyard, Fife, Scotland with many other family members He was succeeded by his eldest son Sir Robert Anstruther, 3rd Baronet.

== Sources ==
- Cockayne, G.E. Complete Baronetage. Vol. 4. p. 366.

Baronetage of Nova Scotia
Preceded by Robert Anstruther	Baronet (of Wrae, Balcaskie, Fife and Braemore); 1737–1763	Succeeded by Robert Anstruther
