= 62nd (Wiltshire) Regiment of Foot =

- Active: 10 December 1756–1 July 1881
- Country: Kingdom of Great Britain (1756–1800); United Kingdom (1801–1881)
- Branch: British Army
- Type: Line Infantry
- Role: Line Infantry (at times Light Infantry)
- Size: One battalion (two battalions 1808–1816)
- Garrison/HQ: Le Marchant Barracks, Devizes
- Nickname: "The Moonrakers" "The Splashers"
- Motto: Honi Soit Qui Mal y Pense
- March: "The Vly be on Turmit" (quick) "May Blossoms" (slow)
- Anniversaries: 21 December (Ferozeshah)
- Engagements: Seven Years' War; American Revolutionary War; French Revolutionary Wars; Napoleonic Wars; First Anglo-Sikh War; Crimean War

The 62nd (Wiltshire) Regiment of Foot was an infantry regiment of the British Army, which was raised in 1756 and saw service through the eighteenth and nineteenth centuries. Under the Childers Reforms it amalgamated with the 99th (Lanarkshire) Regiment of Foot to form the Wiltshire Regiment in 1881.

== History ==
=== Formation, Louisbourg and Carrickfergus ===
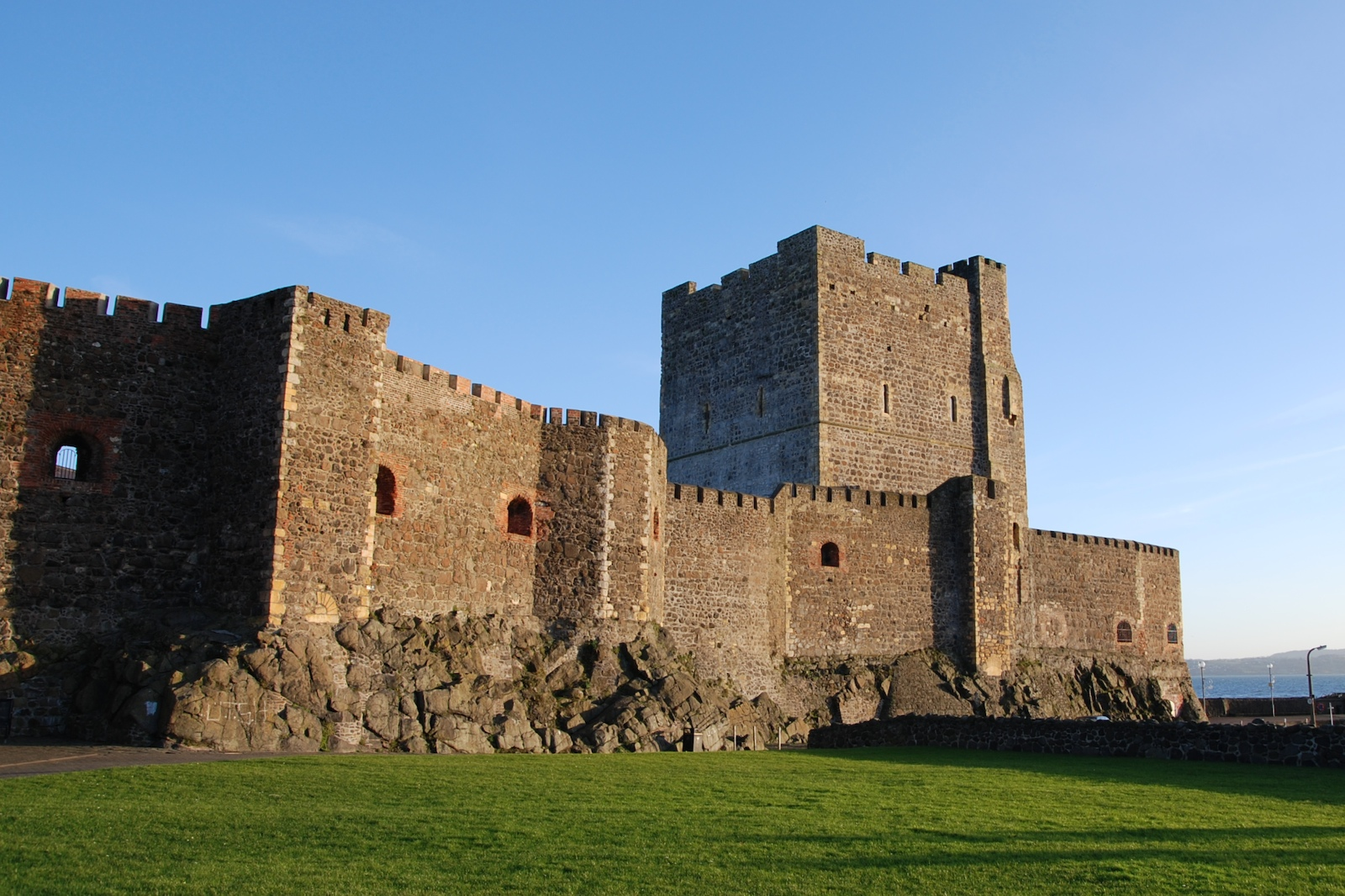
Carrickfergus Castle

The formation of the regiment was prompted by the expansion of the army as a result of the commencement of the Seven Years' War. On 25 August 1756 it was ordered that a number of existing regiments should raise a second battalion; among those chosen was the 4th Regiment of Foot. The 2nd Battalion of the 4th Regiment of Foot was formed on 10 December 1756 and renumbered as the 62nd Regiment of Foot on 21 April 1758. Because of a lack of available marine units, four companies of the regiment were assigned to Admiral Edward Boscawen's fleet as marines. In this capacity, they took part in the Siege of Louisbourg in June 1758. Following the capture of Louisbourg, the regiment participated in General James Wolfe's campaign to capture attack on Quebec. The regiment made a diversionary landing at Beauport to confuse the French.

Although the siege of Louisbourg was the regiment's first battle, it was more than a century before the War Office recognized the part they played. For decades, commanders of the regiment petitioned the War Office for the Louisbourg honour, which had been granted to the other eleven regiments present during the siege. However, the War Office continually refused, stating that there was no record of the regiment being present. This was true because the records which showed they were present were not held in the War Office. By acting as marines, they had been on the Royal Navy's books and thus the records verifying their part in the battle were held by the Admiralty. The regiment finally received the Louisbourg honour in 1910.

The rest of the regiment was assigned to Ireland and eventually assigned as the garrison for Carrickfergus Castle in Carrickfergus, County Antrim. On 23 February 1760, a French force of approximately 600 men conducted an amphibious assault and laid siege to the castle. The castle's defences were in a state of disrepair with a 50-foot breach in the wall.

Under the command of Lieutenant-Colonel John Jennings, the four under-strength companies, approximately 200 men in all, withstood three assaults on the castle. In addition to being outnumbered, the garrison was short of ammunition, having to melt down their buttons to make bullets. By the time the French made their third attack, the defenders had expended all their ammunition and were left with rocks and bayonets. After the third attempt was beaten back, Colonel Jennings was forced to seek terms. After meeting with the French commander, Jennings and his men were allowed to surrender the castle, give their parole, retaining their arms and colours. The French, in return, promised not to plunder the town of Carrickfergus. Although the regiment surrendered the castle, the French squadron which had landed the force was destroyed by the Royal Navy in an action near the Mull of Galloway. An investigation of the defence of Carrickfergus proclaimed that the men "behav'd like Lyons". The Irish Parliament voted a thanks to the Regiment and Carrickfergus presented the officers with silver cups.

In 1761, part of the regiment was sent to Germany to join the British forces serving on the continent. In 1763, the regiment was reunited and deployed to the West Indies where it remained until it was sent to Canada join General William Howe's forces.

The first Colonel-in-Chief was Lieutenant General William Strode, who died on duty in Ireland in 1776.

=== American War of Independence ===
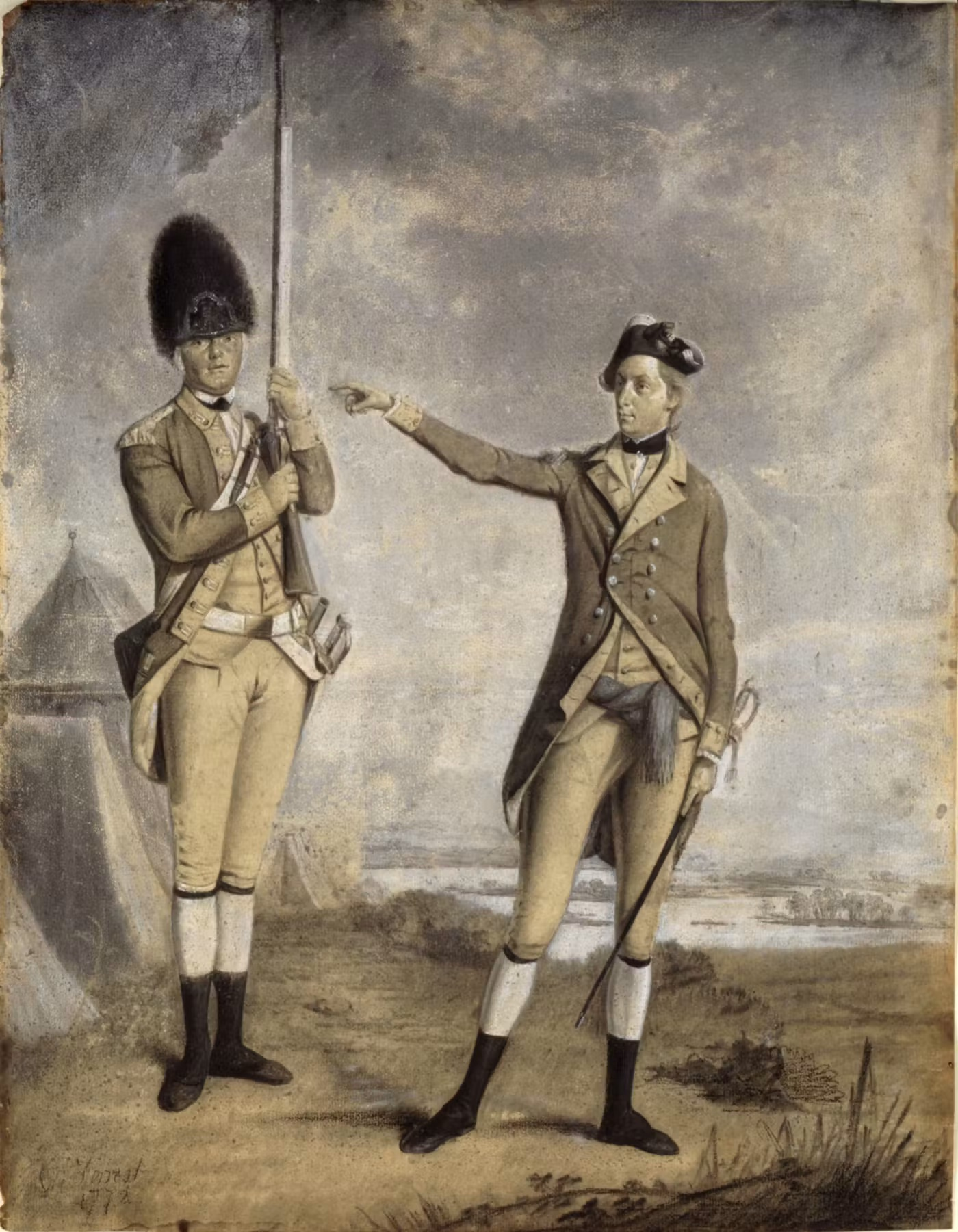
1772 illustration of a regimental corporal and officer

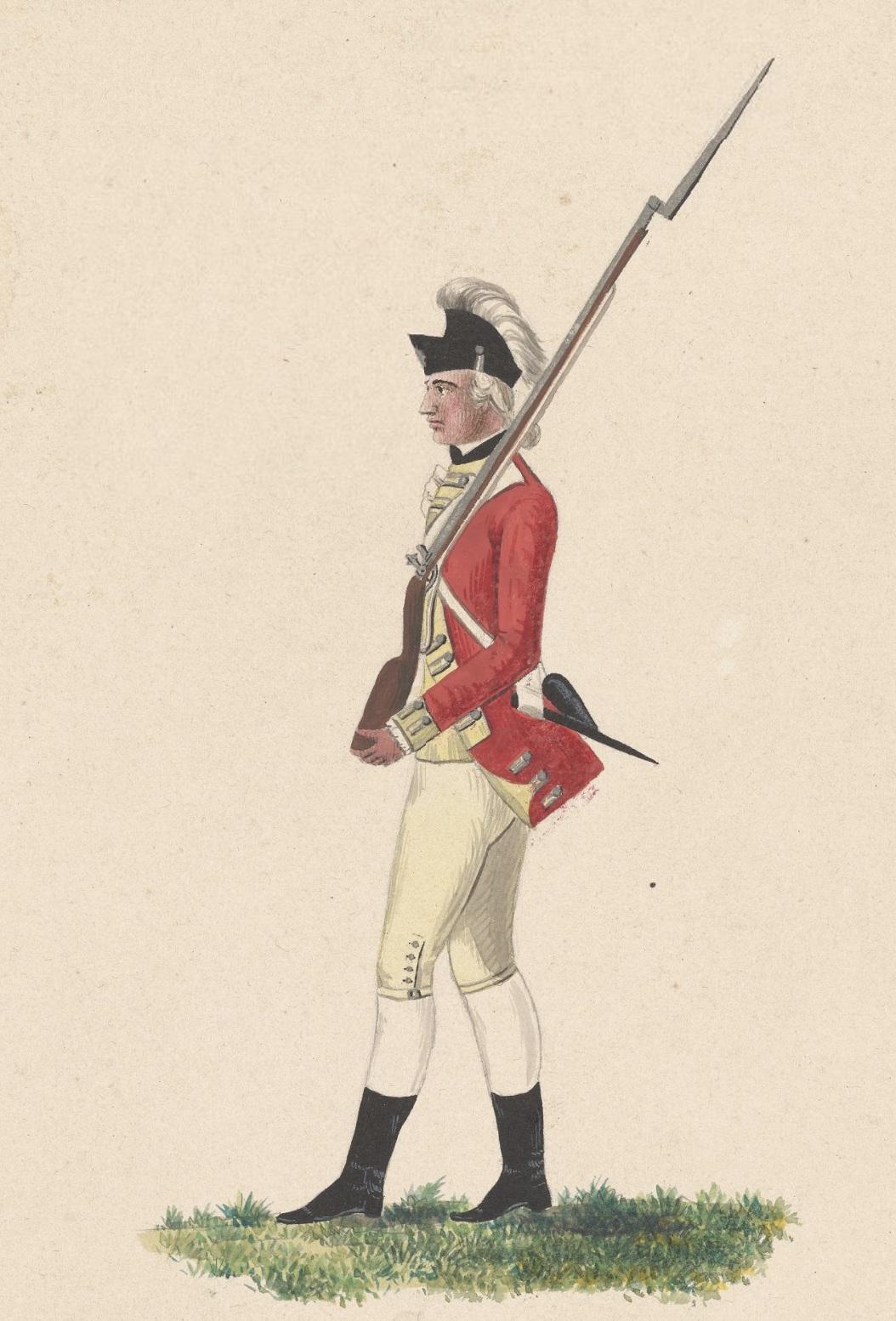
A regimental private in 1778

The regiment returned to North America in 1776, under the command of Lieutenant-colonel John Anstruther. Anstruther would command the regiment from 1773 until retirement in 1782. Initially dispatched to Canada, the regiment took part repelling the Continental Army's invasion of Quebec as part of the American War of Independence. The regiment's flank companies would be detached and take part in the Battle of Trois-Rivières in June 1776. The regiment's companies were reunited to support the British drive to clear the Americans from the rest of Canada, including the Battle of Valcour Island in October 1776.

Following the end of the American invasion in October 1776, the regiment was assigned to serve as part of Major-general John Burgoyne's forces. The regiment served under Burgoyne at the Battle of Saratoga in September 1777. The regiment was brigaded with the 9th, 20th, and 21st Regiments of Foot under the command of Major-general James Inglis Hamilton. The regiment surrendered along with the rest of the force and most of the regiment remained imprisoned until 1781 when they were repatriated to England. In 1782, now under the command of Lieutenant-colonel Alexander Campbell, the regiment was given, for the first time, the county title "Wiltshire".

=== Napoleonic Wars ===
In 1791, at the start of the French Revolution, the regiment was sent to the West Indies. In 1795, the regiment transferred to Jamaica. The regiment spent most of 1796 fighting in a British invasion of Saint-Domingue (now Haiti). As with the rest of that British expedition, the regiment suffered heavily from yellow fever. After transferring men to other units, the cadre returned by ship to England in 1797.

In 1799, the regiment was expanded into a two battalion regiment. However, with the Treaty of Amiens in 1802, the 2nd battalion was disbanded. When hostilities resumed, a second battalion was once again raised in 1804. Initially, the second battalion was raised for limited service; however the rank and file volunteered for additional services. In 1808, the 2nd battalion was assigned to garrison Jersey, the 1st battalion having been dispatched to Sicily in 1809.

The 1st battalion participated in a raid under General John Stuart resulting in the destruction of the magazines at Ischia and Procida. In 1811, elements of the 1st battalion participated in another raid on the Italian mainland. Three companies were landed at Palinuro. For three days, they engaged a French force of approximately 1,000, and in the process destroyed three batteries and captured a French convoy. Detachments of the 1st battalion were used on gunboat duty operating out of Messina. These army crewed gunboats managed to capturing a French privateer and retaking two of her prizes. In 1812, the 1st battalion was transferred to eastern Spain to support Wellington's forces on the Peninsula.

The 2nd battalion, along with the 2nd battalion of the 47th Regiment of Foot and the 2nd battalion of the 84th Regiment of Foot, was attached to Major-General Lord Aylmer's independent brigade during Wellington's offensive across the Pyrenees beginning in 1813. The 2nd battalion then moved on in preparation for the Battle of Bayonne when the war ended. The 2nd battalion was then sent to Ireland after a brief period of occupation duties in France.

In 1814, after spending time in Spain, 1st battalion was assigned again to an expedition to Italy. The battalion landed at Livorno before marching on Genoa. Like many other units of the British Army, upon Napoleon's abdication, the 1st battalion was ordered to British North America to fight against the United States in the American War of 1812. A detachment of 12 men were deployed to the Gulf Coast. Five companies of the 1st Battalion were stationed from July, 1815, to 1819 at St. George's, Bermuda, British North America (the Bermuda Garrison being part of the Nova Scotia Command until Bermuda was left out of the 1867 Confederation of Canada), an Imperial fortress colony brought to prominence by the American War of 1812. The Commanding Officer, Lieutenant-Colonel David Ximenes, married Eliza Mary Evans, the daughter of Royal Navy Captain Fitzherbert Evans of the Bermuda Naval Yard (which alternated seasonally with the Halifax Naval Yard as main base for the North America Station), at St. George's on the 5 August 1816. Neither of the battalions of the regiment were present at the Battle of Waterloo. The 1st battalion was sent to the West Indies, while the 2nd battalion was sent to France for occupation duties after the conclusion of the Hundred Days. In 1816 the 2nd battalion was disbanded and its officers put on half-pay.

Following the Napoleonic Wars, the regiment returned to Halifax, Nova Scotia. It remained there until 1823 when it was rotated to Ireland. The regiment remained in Ireland until 1830.

=== Victorian era ===
In 1830, the regiment was deployed to India. Arriving in September 1830, the regiment was initially garrisoned at Bangalore. After two relatively quiet years in India, the regiment participated in putting down the abortive Bangalore Mutiny. The next twelve years passed relatively quietly for the regiment. At the end of 1844, the regiment was ordered to Ferozepore. There they joined the British East India Company forces gathering there.

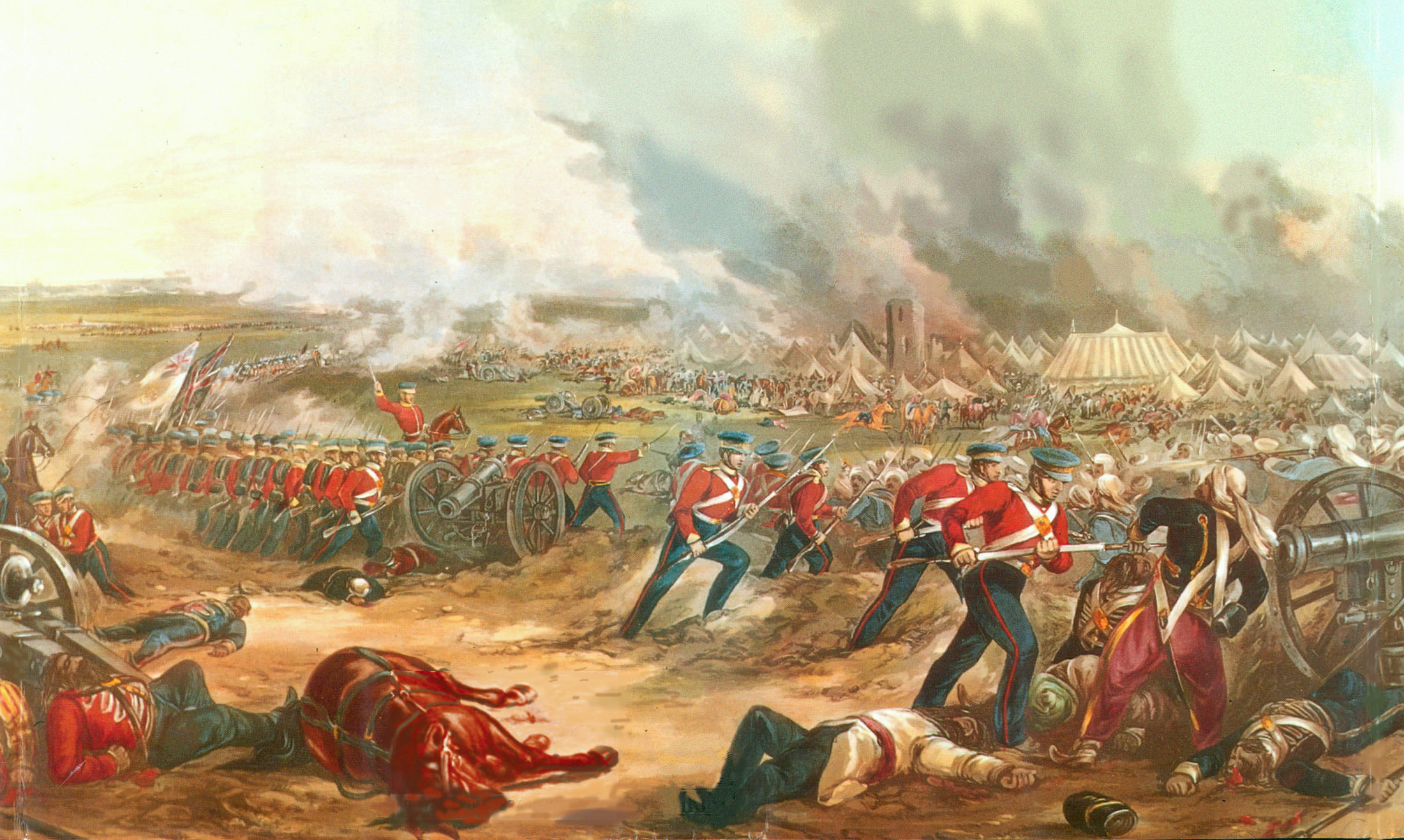
The regiment at the Battle of Ferozeshah

From March until December 1845, the regiment garrisoned the area as tensions between British-controlled India and Sikhs escalated. In December 1845, hostilities began in the First Anglo-Sikh War. On 21–22 December 1845, the regiment fought in the Battle of Ferozeshah. There the British-Company forces, under the command of General Hugh Gough, were successful in a hard-fought battle where the regiment suffered heavy casualties, including 18 out of 23 officers and 281 out of 580 other ranks. The regiment had been part of an attack on the strongest part of the Sikh lines. However, they were unable to carry the position at bayonet point and were forced to retreat with the rest of their division. By the end of the first day of battle, no officers were left to take charge of the regiment. Command of the regiment devolved to its sergeants and non-commissioned officers. In honor of their leadership, 21 December became a regimental anniversary.

Although the honor for Ferozeshah would be considered one of the regiment's crowning moments, it did not come without controversy. In his report of the battle, the divisional commander reported that the regiment was "panic-struck" during the fighting and that was the cause of its losses. This was contradicted by General Gough's report. In the end, Gough's version was supported by Parliament, the Duke of Wellington, and the army staff at Horse Guards.

Although diminished by its losses at Ferozeshah, the regiment also fought at the Battle of Sobraon in February 1846. There they served in General Robert Dick's Division, participating in the main bayonet assault against the Sikh defences once Gough's forces ran out of artillery ammunition.

Despite the regiment's exploits at Ferozeshah and Sobaron being among the regiment's proudest honours, the tour in India was also the sight of one its greatest embarrassments. On two separate occasions, the regiment lost its colors. At first, they were lost when the boat carrying them sank in the Ganges in 1842. The second time, after they were recovered, they burned when the same boat caught fire in 1847. The regiment remained in India for another two years. In that time, the regiment was garrisoned at various stations in India, in addition to performing ceremonial duties for visiting dignitaries. The regiment returned to England in 1847 before being sent to Ireland in 1854.

=== Crimean War ===
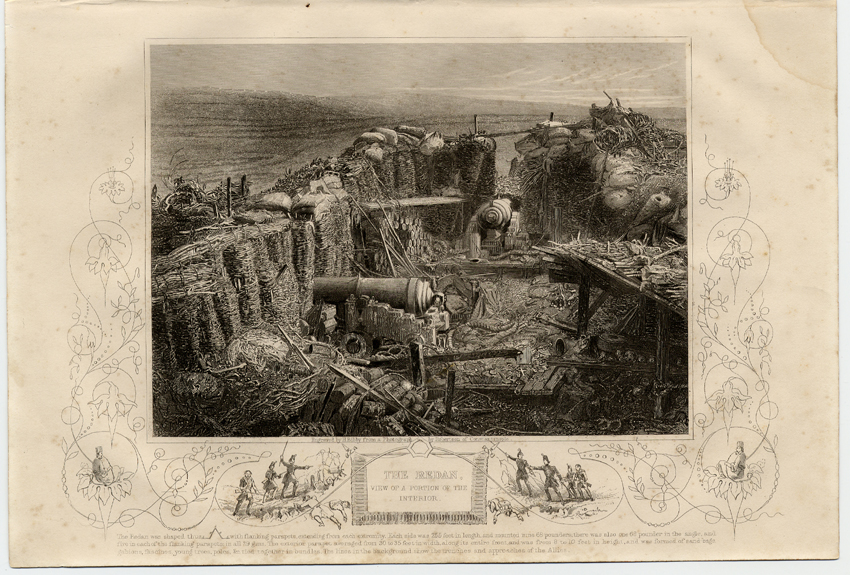
Photograph of the interior of the Great Redan after the fall of Sevastopol.

For the next few years the regiment served in Ireland, assigned to the garrison at Fermoy. In January 1854, with war brewing in the Black Sea, the regiment was put on notice for service in Crimea. The regiment saw action in the Crimean War as part of the Second Division. The regiment participated in the Siege of Sevastopol in winter 1854. On 8 September 1855, the regiment was among the battalions which took part in the failed assault of the Redan bastion. Once again, the regiment suffered heavy casualties, including half of its officers and senior non-commissioned officers.

=== Canada, Ireland, India, Aden and Amalgamation ===
The regiment returned to Canada in 1857 and remained there until 1864 when it came home. A year later, the regiment returned to Ireland and engaged the Fenians in an action at Kilmallock while defending some police barracks in March 1867. Two years later, the regiment returned to India and traveled through the Punjab in July 1879. The regiment then transferred to Aden in 1880.

As part of the Cardwell Reforms of the 1870s, where single-battalion regiments were linked together to share a single depot and recruiting district in the United Kingdom, the 62nd was linked with the 99th (Lanarkshire) Regiment of Foot, and assigned to district no. 38 at Le Marchant Barracks in Devizes. On 1 July 1881 the Childers Reforms came into effect and the regiment amalgamated with the 99th (Lanarkshire) Regiment of Foot to form the Wiltshire Regiment.

== Battle honours ==
Battle hours won by the regiment were:

- Peninsular War: Nive, Peninsula
- Anglo-Sikh War: Ferozeshah, Sobraon
- Crimean War: Sevastopol

== Colonels of the Regiment ==
Colonels of the Regiment were:

- 1742–1748: Col. John Batereau
- Regiment disbanded 1748

=== 62nd Regiment of Foot - (1758) ===
- 1758–1776: Lt-Gen. William Strode
- 1776–1779: Maj-Gen. Valentine Jones
- 1779–1805: Gen. Edward Mathew

=== 62nd (the Wiltshire) Regiment of Foot - (1782) ===
- 1805–1806: F.M. Sir George Nugent, 1st Baronet, GCB
- 1806–1810: Gen. Sir Eyre Coote, GCB, KC
- 1810–1837: F.M. Sir Samuel Hulse, GCH
- 1837–1840: Gen. Sir Frederick Augustus Wetherall, GCH
- 1840–1843: Lt-Gen. Sir Archibald Campbell, 1st Baronet, GCB (of Ava)
- 1843–1850: F.M. Sir John Forster Fitzgerald, GCB
- 1850: Gen. Sir James Fergusson, GCB
- 1850–1851: Lt-Gen. William Smelt, CB
- 1851–1858: Lt-Gen. Thomas Lightfoot, CB
- 1858–1881: Gen. Sir William Thomas Knollys, KCB

== Sources ==
- Bartlett, Thomas (1997). A Military History of Ireland. New York: Cambridge University Press. ISBN 978-0521415996.
- Chant, Christopher (1988). The Handbook of British Regiments. London, IMP Publishing Services.
- Jones, Charles Henry (1882). History of The Campaign For The Conquest of Canada in 1776. Philadelphia: Porter & Coates.
- Nafziger, George F.; Gioannini, Marco (2002). The defense of the Napoleonic kingdom of Northern Italy, 1813-1814. Westport, Conn.: Praeger. ISBN 978-0-313-07531-5.
- Rudolf, R. de M. (1906). Short Histories of the Territorial Regiments of the British Army. London: His Majesty's Stationery Office.
- Rutt, Graham (2014). Cycling Britain's Cathedrals. Vol. 1. Lulu. ISBN 978-1326056049.
- The Old Springers: A Historical Sketch of The 62nd Regiment in United Services Magazine no. 496. London: A. Schulze. 1870.
