= Alexander Square =

Garden square in Chelsea district, London

Coordinates: 51°29′43″N 0°10′10″W

Alexander Square is a garden square in London's Chelsea district, SW3. The communal garden at the centre of the development is 0.1226 hectares (0.303 acres) in size.

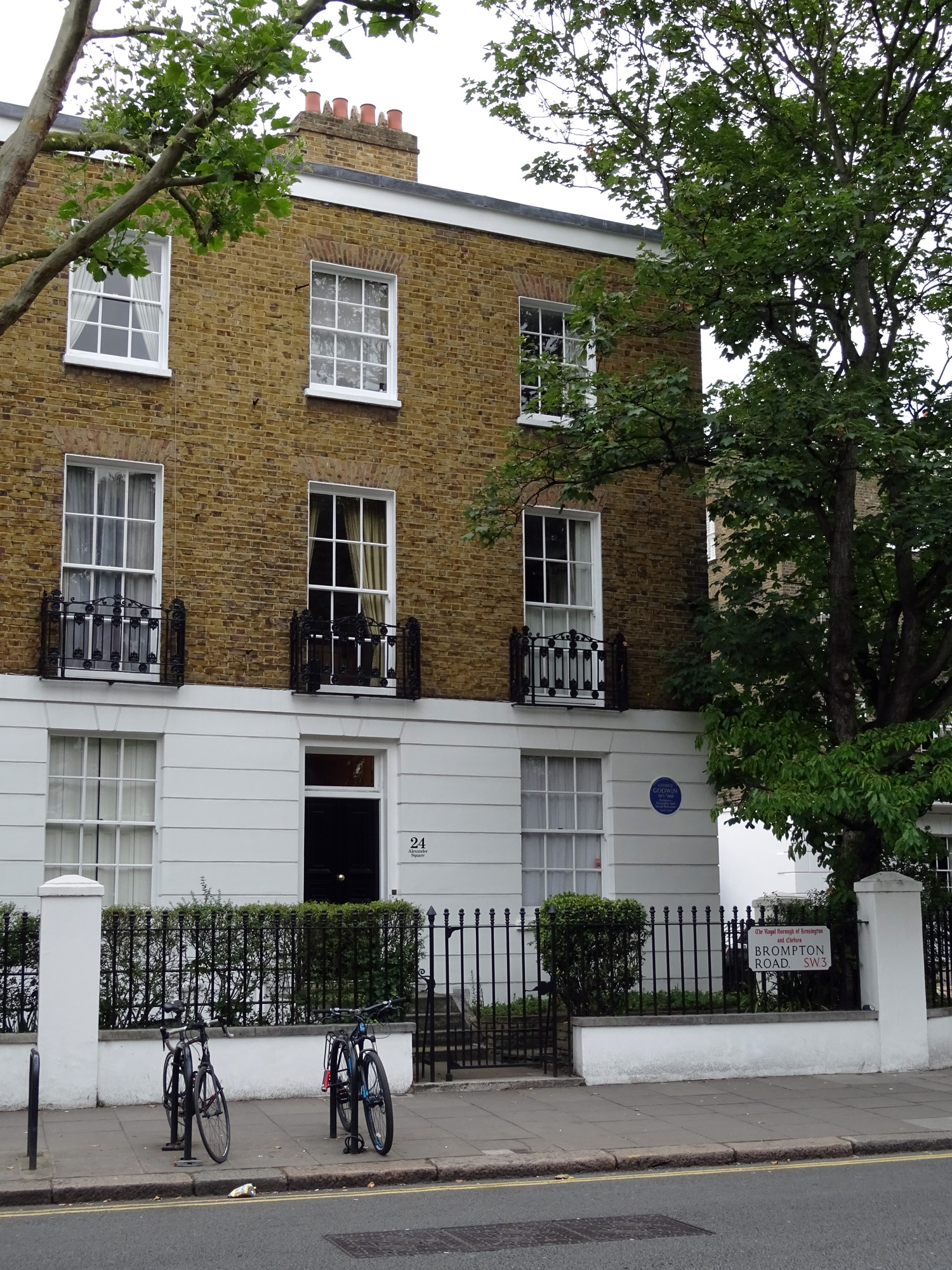
The English Heritage blue plaque commemorating George Goodwin at 24 Alexander Square

In 1826 John Alexander, the inheritor of the Thurlow Estate as a descendant of the first husband of Anna Maria Browne, drew up plans to for a speculative development with the builder James Bonnin. Alexander Square and South Street, Alfred Place, North Terrace, Alexander Place and York Cottages were subsequently built. George Basevi became the architect of the scheme when under construction in 1829.

The average price of a property in Alexander Square was £7.3 million in 2019.

5–12, 13–20, and 21–24 Alexander Square are listed Grade II on the National Heritage List for England.

== Notable residents ==
- No. 24 was the residence of the architect and journalist George Godwin. His residence is marked by a Greater London Council blue plaque placed in 1969.
