= Master Carver =

The Master Carver or Hereditary Carver is a member of the Royal household of Scotland. A Crown Charter of 1704 ratified by Parliament in 1705, erected Sir William Anstruther's land into the Barony of Anstruther and conferred upon him the heritable offices of Master Carver and one of the Masters of the Household. It is not clear why the office was created, except that the family appears to have held similar offices from 1585 onwards. The current holder of the office is Sir Sebastian Anstruther of Balcluskie.

== See also ==
- Clan Anstruther
