= Sir Robert Anstruther, 1st Baronet =

Scottish politician

Sir Robert Anstruther, 1st Baronet (1658 – March 1737), of Wrae, Linlithgow, and Balcaskie, Fife, was a Scottish politician who sat in the Parliament of Scotland between 1681 and 1707 and in the British House of Commons from 1709 to 1710.

== Early life ==
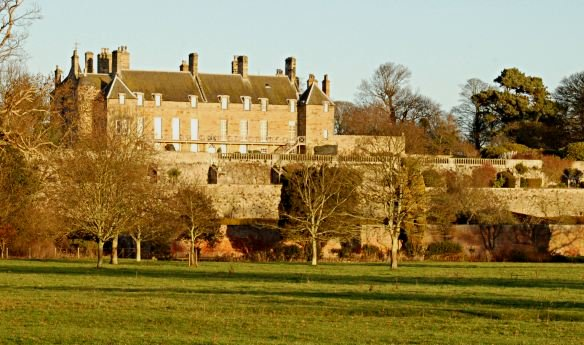
Balcaskie, Fife

Anstruther was baptized on 24 September 1658, the third son of Sir Philip Anstruther of Anstruther, Fife, a member of the Scottish Parliament, and his wife Christian Lumsden, daughter of Sir James Lumsden of Innergellie, Fife.

== Career ==
Anstruther had an early spell in the Parliament of Scotland as a Burgh Commissioner for Anstruther Easter from 1681 to 1682. He married Sophia Kinnear, the daughter and coheiress of David Kinnear, and adopted the additional name of Kinnear on the death of his father-in law in 1684. Sophia died in 1686 and he married as his second wife Jean Monteith, the daughter and heiress of William Monteith of Wrae, on 12 March 1687. From 1689 to 1690, unlike his brother, he served the regime of King William on various local commissions. He was caught up in a double returned for Anstruther Easter, and the result was decided against him. He was given a place as one of the general receivers of supply in 1691. He was created a baronet of Wrae, Linlithgowshire and Balcaskie, Fife and Braemore, Caithness on 28 November 1694. In 1696 he was appointed joint farmer of excise, and in 1697 was appointed clerk and keeper of cocquet seal, Firth of Forth west of Queensferry. He lost at least £500 in the Darien scheme and lost money in the farm of the Scottish excise, but had married two heiresses. He was able to purchase in 1698 an estate at Balcaskie, on the Fife coast where he went on to build a house. He also served as a commissioner to the convention of royal burghs for the neighbouring burgh of Anstruther Easter. He married as his third wife, his cousin Marian Preston, the daughter of Sir William Preston, 2nd Baronet of Valleyfield, Fife.

In 1702 Anstruther became Burgh Commissioner for Anstruther Wester. He opposed the Union and took part in the protests in 1705 against the treaty act. In Parliament he was frequently absent in the divisions on the Union and five of his only six votes were on the opposition side. He probably acted according to the influence of the Court Tory Lord Leven. He lost his seat and his government posts in 1707.

After the union of Scotland with England, Anstruther was returned to the new Parliament of Great Britain as Member of Parliament for Fife at a by-election on 24 March 1709. There was little time for him to make any impression and he did not stand at the 1710 British general election.

== Death and legacy ==
Anstruther died in March 1737. He had had five sons and two daughters by his second wife and one son and two daughters by his third wife. One of his sons was killed at the Battle of Preston in 1715 and another rose to the rank of general in the service of the Hanoverians. He was succeeded by his eldest son Philip Anstruther.

Parliament of Great Britain
Preceded by Patrick Moncreiff	Member of Parliament for Fife; 1709–1710	Succeeded by Sir Alexander Areskine
Baronetage of Nova Scotia
New creation	Baronet (of Wrae, Linlithgowshire and Balcaskie, Fife and Braemore, Caithness); 1694–1737	Succeeded by Philip Anstruther
