= Battle of Carrickfergus (1597) =

Battle during the Nine Years War

Coordinates: 54.713°N 5.806°W

- Part of the Nine Years' War
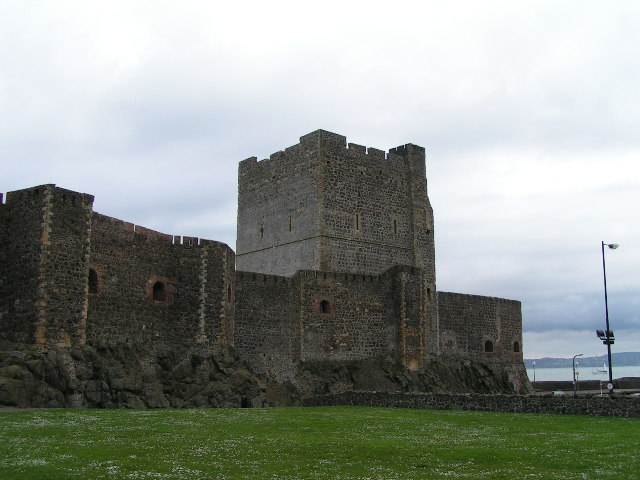
Date	4 November 1597
Location	near Carrickfergus, northeastern Ireland
Result	MacDonnell victory

Belligerents
Clan MacDonnell of Antrim and allies	England

Commanders and leaders
James MacSorley MacDonnell	John Chichester †

Strength
1,500	?

Casualties and losses
low	180 killed, 30–40 wounded

The Battle of Carrickfergus took place in November 1597, in the province of Ulster in what is now County Antrim, Northern Ireland, during the Nine Years War. It was fought between the crown forces of Queen Elizabeth I and the Gaelic clan of MacDonnell, with military support from Hugh O'Neill, Earl of Tyrone, and resulted in a defeat for the English.

== Background ==
The north-east of Ulster was much fought over during the 16th century. Carrickfergus itself had been the base for a failed English attempt to colonise that corner of the province in the 1570s, but in the following decades the English influence gave way to the MacDonnells under the leadership of Sorley Boy.

In 1595 the Irish lords in Ulster rose out in rebellion under Hugh O'Neill, and the crown's only foothold in County Antrim was at Carrickfergus, and a small garrison in Belfast Castle. The MacDonnells adopted a wait-and-see policy, without committing themselves fully to the crown in its campaign to break the rebellion, though they facilitated Tyrone's arms shipments out of Scotland, primarily Glasgow.

In 1597, the recently appointed English governor of Carrickfergus Castle, John Chichester, had enjoyed successes against the strongholds of the Clandeboye O'Neills, and was negotiating with Sorley Boy's nephew, James MacSorley MacDonnell, over a series of raids and counter-raids in the locality. The Scots were aggrieved over certain cavalry operations that had lately been carried out in the governor's absence, and a parley was arranged for 4 November 1597 to hear their demand for reparations. Unknown to Chichester, James MacSorley had met with Tyrone on 1 November, where the earl offered his daughter's hand in marriage, and more importantly reinforced the Scots with 500 Irish shot armed with calivers.

== The battle ==
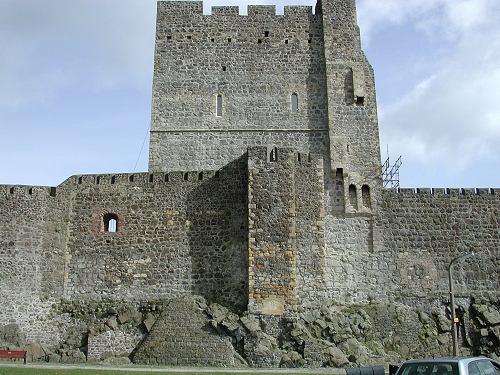
East wall and keep of Carrickfergus Castle

On the appointed day MacDonnell was sighted by the English on his approach to Carrickfergus Castle at the head of 700 troops. Not wishing to be outdone, the governor came out with the bulk of his men, just five companies of foot - who were wearied from a recent expedition - and one of horse. He led them out four miles, until the Scots were encountered, and then halted to allow his troops to close up on the advanced guard. In the interval the officers debated, one veteran urging the governor to proceed with the parley. But when his troops drew up, the governor turned to his commander, Captain Merriman (correctly Marmion), and said, "Now, Captain, yonder be your old friends. What say you? Shall we charge them?" Merriman (Marmion) assented, and was supported by the commander of the horse, Moses Hill.

The order to charge was given, and the Scots fell back over the hilly terrain. But the English riders were not sure of their lead, and the governor was quickly isolated with a small party, which had managed to keep pace with him. Moreover, MacDonnell had drawn the English into a trap. MacDonnell had hidden 800 troops to his rear, which included Scots bowmen, swordsmen and Irish pike but more significantly 500 Irish shot. Without warning, volleys of shot poured into the English ranks from Tyrone's shot hidden on rough ground. On a counter-charge, the Scots and Irish surged around and broke the formation of the crown troops. The governor was wounded in the leg but tried to rally his men by remounting and charging down the slope. He was shot through the head and killed outright. Another officer was hit in the head and captured, another had his horse shot out from under him, and another was shot through the shoulder.

The crown forces were dismayed, and although reinforcements - including the sick, so depleted was the garrison - sallied out from the castle and prevented a massacre, the death toll on the English side reached 180, with 30-40 wounded. Some managed to survive by swimming away in Larne Lough, with or without their horses, and fetched up on the shore of the peninsula of Island Magee. After the battle James MacSorley had Chichester's head cut off, packed in a barrel and sent to the earl of Tyrone in Dungannon.

== Aftermath ==
The English defeat was partly put down to a lack of gunpowder, but there was no attempt to excuse the crassness and ineptitude of the governor's conduct. Despite the size of the force he had chosen to bring to a mere parley, MacDonnell had little difficulty in justifying his own conduct. There was some irony in the Scots' victory, because MacDonnell's father, Sorley Boy, had sacked the town over twenty years before in revenge for the English massacre of clan dependents on Rathlin Island.

== Bibliography ==
- James O'Neill, The Nine Years War, 1593-1603: O'Neill, Mountjoy and the Military Revolution (Dublin, 2017).
- Richard Bagwell, Ireland under the Tudors 3 vols. (London, 1885–1890).
- Hiram Morgan Tyrone's Rebellion (1993). ISBN 0-86193-224-2.
- Cyril Falls Elizabeth's Irish Wars (1950; reprint London, 1996). ISBN 0-09-477220-7.
- Gerard Anthony Hayes McCoy Irish Battles (Belfast, 1989). ISBN 0-86281-212-7.
- Marmion, Chev. William, 'The Marmion Family of Carlingford to 1660', Journal of the
- County Louth Arch. & Historical Society, 2000.
