= Alexander Anstruther (cricketer) =

Indian-born Scottish cricketer

Personal information
- Full name: Alexander William Anstruther
- Born: 3 October 1846; Rajahmundry, Madras, British India
- Died: 18 October 1902 (aged 56); Wormit, Fife, Scotland
- Batting: Right-handed

Domestic team information
- Years: Team
- 1873–1887: MCC
- 1875–1878: Sussex
- FC debut: 31 July 1873 MCC v Surrey Club
- Last FC: 16 May 1887 MCC v Kent

Career statistics
Competition	First-class
Matches	14
Runs scored	281
Batting average	11.70
100s/50s	0/0
Top score	43
Balls bowled	40
Wickets	0
Bowling average	–
5 wickets in innings	–
10 wickets in match	–
Best bowling	–
Catches/stumpings	4/–
- Source: CricketArchive, 20 August 2008

Alexander William Anstruther (3 October 1846 – 18 October 1902) was an Indian-born Scottish first-class cricketer. He was a right-handed batsman who played first-class cricket for Marylebone Cricket Club (MCC) and Sussex.

Anstruther made his debut in the 1873 season, playing for the MCC, though it wasn't until almost exactly a year later he made his next first-class appearance. Anstruther made six appearances for the MCC in total, before moving to play with Sussex.

Anstruther made his first appearance for Sussex in 1878, playing as captain and making the highest score of his debut Sussex innings. However, his team lost the match by an innings margin. He played four further games for the team that season, though his Sussex team failed to win a single one.

Following this, Anstruther played in just two first-class matches, both for the MCC, the first in 1880, and the final one seven years later.

Anstruther's nephew, Robert Anstruther, played one first-class match in the 1910–11 season.
