= Sir John Anstruther, 4th Baronet =

British politician

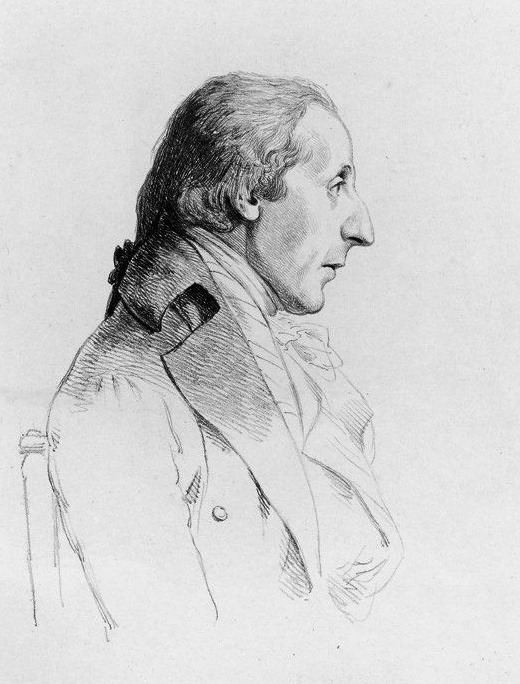
Sir John Anstruther, c. 1809

Sir John Anstruther, 4th Baronet and 1st Baronet PC (27 March 1753 – 26 January 1811) was a Scottish politician.

The second son of Sir John Anstruther, 2nd Baronet, he was knighted in 1797, raised to the Baronetage of Great Britain in 1798, and also succeeded as 4th Baronet in the Baronetage of Nova Scotia on the death of his elder brother, Philip, in 1808.

He served as Member of Parliament for Anstruther Burghs, in Fife, from 1783 to 1790, 1796–1797 and 1806–1811, and for Cockermouth, in Cumberland, from 1790 to 1796. He was appointed a Privy Counsellor in 1806.

== Life ==
He was born on 27 March 1753, the second son of Sir John Anstruther of Elie House, Fife. He was educated at Glasgow University under John Millar, and called to the bar at Lincoln's Inn in 1779. He practised chiefly before the House of Lords in Scotch appeals and was M.P. for Cockermouth, 1790–96.

He was an active supporter of Charles James Fox, and one of the managers appointed to conduct the Impeachment of Warren Hastings, his duty being to sum up the evidence on the charge relating to Benares, and to open the charge relating to presents. He had legal connections with Samuel Romilly and shared with Jeremy Bentham an interest in Enlightenment ideas. In 1797 he was appointed Chief Justice of Bengal and created a baronet in 1798. From 1799 to 1807 he was President of the Asiatic Society of Bengal. In 1806 he returned to Britain, was sworn on the privy council and re-entered parliament the same year as member for the Anstruther district of burghs.

In 1808 he succeeded to his father's baronetcy in addition to his own. He died in London 26 January 1811 and was succeeded by his son Sir John Carmichael-Anstruther, 5th Baronet, who also took his place as MP for Anstruther Burghs.

== Family ==
His daughter Marion Anstruther (1797–1859) married his nephew Robert Anstruther WS (1803–1867) and is buried with him in Dean Cemetery.

Parliament of Great Britain
Preceded by Sir John Anstruther, Bt	Member of Parliament for Anstruther Burghs; 1783–1790	Succeeded by Sir John Carmichael-Anstruther
Preceded by Humphrey Senhouse; James Clarke Satterthwaite	Member of Parliament for Cockermouth; 1790–1796; With: John Baynes Garforth	Succeeded by Edward Burrow; John Baynes Garforth
Preceded by William Dundas	Member of Parliament for Anstruther Burghs; 1796–1797	Succeeded by Alexander Campbell
Parliament of the United Kingdom
Preceded by Alexander Campbell	Member of Parliament for Anstruther Burghs; 1806–1811	Succeeded by Sir John Carmichael-Anstruther
Baronetage of Great Britain
New creation	Baronet (of Anstruther); 1798 creation 1798–1811	Succeeded by John Carmichael-Anstruther
Preceded by Anderson baronets	Anstruther baronets of Anstruther; 18 May 1798	Succeeded by Williams baronets
Baronetage of Nova Scotia
Preceded by Philip Anstruther-Paterson	Baronet (of Anstruther); 1700 creation 1808–1811	Succeeded by John Carmichael-Anstruther
