= Smelt family =

Family from Yorkshire (fl. 1650s)

The Smelt family was a family from Yorkshire. It owned many of the burgages in Northallerton and was prominent in the town from the mid 17th century onwards.

== Members ==
- Leonard Smelt; married Grace Frankland, by whom he had issue:
  - Leonard Smelt (1683-1740), English MP; married Elizabeth Whitaker
  - William Smelt (1690-1755), English MP; married Dorothy Cayley, by whom he had issue:
    - Leonard Smelt (1719-1800), Royal Engineers officer, sub-governor to the sons of George III
    - Cornelius Smelt
      - Cornelius Smelt (1748–1832), Lieutenant Governor of the Isle of Mann
- William Smelt (1788-1858), British Army officer

== Sources ==
- http://www.historyofparliamentonline.org/volume/1690-1715/member/smelt-leonard-1683-1740
- http://www.historyofparliamentonline.org/volume/1715-1754/member/smelt-william-1690-1755
