= Philip Bainbrigge =

British Army general

General Sir Philip Bainbrigge KCB
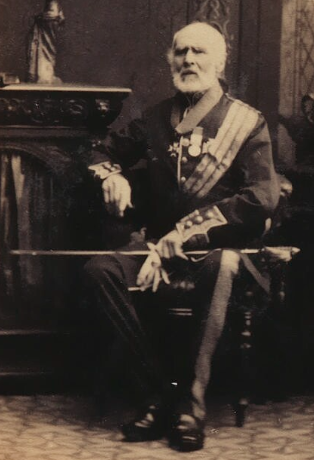
- Photograph by Camille Silvy, 1862
- Born: 4 February 1786; London
- Died: 20 December 1862 (aged 76); Titchfield
- Burial place: St Peter's Churchyard, Titchfield
- Education: Royal Military College, High Wycombe
- Military career
- Allegiance: United Kingdom
- Branch: British Army
- Service years: 1800–1862
- Rank: General
- Commands: General Officer Commanding, Ceylon
- Conflicts: French Revolutionary Wars; Napoleonic Wars; Peninsular War; Siege of Ciudad Rodrigo; Siege of Badajoz; Siege of the Salamanca forts; Battle of Salamanca; Siege of Burgos; Battle of Tordesillas; Battle of Vitoria; Siege of San Sebastián; Battle of the Pyrenees; Battle of the Nive; Battle of Garris; Action at Tarbes; Battle of Toulouse; Hundred Days
- Awards: Military General Service Medal

General Sir Philip Bainbrigge KCB (4 February 1786 – 20 December 1862) was a British Army officer. He was present at the sieges and storming of Ciudad Rodrigo and Badajoz, and later the advance to Madrid. He later joined the British army in its advance to Paris, and held positions in Belfast and Ceylon. He was appointed Knight Commander of the Order of the Bath and died at St. Margaret's in 1862.

== Biography ==
=== Family and early life ===
Bainbrigge was descended from an ancient family long resident in the counties of Leicester and Derby. He was the eldest son of Lieutenant-colonel Philip Bainbrigge, of Ashbourne, Derbyshire, and Rachel, daughter of Peter Dobrée, Esq., of Beauregard, Guernsey, and was born in London in 1786. He entered the navy as a midshipman in the Caesar, under Admiral Sir James Saumarez, in 1799, but left it from ill-health. His father, who served under the Duke of York in the expedition to Holland, was killed in the attack on Egmond aan Zee on 6 October 1799, and the next year the duke appointed young Bainbrigge to an ensigncy in the 20th regiment.

=== Military career ===
In 1800 he became a lieutenant, but being fourteen years of age, he obtained a year's leave, which he spent at Green's military academy at Deptford, and joined his regiment at Malta in 1801. At the peace of Amiens his regiment was reduced and he was placed on half-pay, but was brought on full pay into the 7th fusiliers. Returning to England in 1803, he was employed in obtaining volunteers from the militia to form the 2nd battalion of the 7th, which when completed was removed to Colchester. Here the troops were reviewed by the Duke of York, and Lieutenant Bainbrigge, who by his zeal and diligence had given much satisfaction, was gazetted, on 17 Oct. 1805, to a company in the 18th Royal Irish, and joined the 1st battalion of the regiment in the West Indies.

After the taking of Curaçao from the Dutch in 1807, he was appointed inspector of fortifications on that island, where he made plans of the forts and defences which subsequently recommended him to the authorities at the Royal Horse Guards. He exchanged into the 93rd, and, returning to England, laid his plans and surveys before the Duke of York, who advised him to qualify himself for the staff by studying at the Senior Division of the new Royal Military College at High Wycombe. He entered the college in 1809, and studied so diligently that in a year and a half he passed his examination with distinction. While at the college, he invented the protracting pocket sextant, which was favourably noticed by the board of examiners, and enabled him to do surveys with remarkable accuracy and rapidity. On leaving the college Captain Bainbrigge was appointed deputy assistant quartermaster-general in the British army in Portugal. On arriving at Lord Wellington's headquarters he was posted to the fourth division, commanded by Major-general Cole, and stationed near Torres Vedras, and was at once sent to examine the island of Lyceria, a tract of flat alluvial land in the Tagus, to ascertain whether troops could cross it. He was then brought to headquarters, where for some time he was employed in sketching ground and reporting on positions in various directions, which exposed him to the risk of capture by the enemy who occupied the country. His ability was acknowledged, for in a letter to Marshal Beresford, dated Cartaxo, 4 Jan. 1811, Lord Wellington said he was appointed to the staff of the army on account of the ability he showed at High Wycombe.

=== Prominent battles ===
He was present at the sieges and storming of Ciudad Rodrigo and Badajoz. As soon as Badajoz was taken he was ordered to join the sixth division, under Sir H. Clinton, at Albuera, and take charge of the quartermaster-general's department. On the advance of the army into Spain in 1812, Captain Bainbrigge, who had examined the country which was to become the scene of operations, was brought to headquarters. He was present at the siege of the forts of Salamanca, at the affairs of Costillegos and Costrejon, and at the crossing of the Guarena, his duties being to carry orders and make sketches of the country and positions. On one occasion, being with Lord Wellington on high ground on the right bank of the Tormes watching the enemy crossing the river at Huerta, his lordship suddenly told him to ride in the direction which he pointed out on the other side of the Tormes, to examine the ground and make a sketch of it. He accordingly rode down to the ford of Santa Marta, and crossing Over to the ground between the ford and the two Arapile hills, a distance of about three miles, made his sketch while the enemy's skirmishers were in immediate proximity, and brought back a plan in about two hours and a half. It was on part of this ground that the battle of Salamanca was afterwards fought. On another occasion he was ordered to conduct a column of the army then at Pareda, three leagues off, through a difficult country and in face of the enemy to Vallesa. He did so successfully, and brought the column in the midst of the night safely to its destination. On the day of the battle of Salamanca he was constantly with Lord Wellington, and at a critical moment he carried the order for the advance of General Leith's division.

After this decisive victory he accompanied the army in the advance to Madrid, and from thence to Valladolid and Burgos. He was present at part of the siege of Burgos, and soon after was appointed permanent assistant quartermaster-general with the rank of major. In the retreat from Burgos he rendered very important services through his knowledge of the country, which was considered of so much value that Sir H. Clinton asked for his return to the sixth division, but it was decided that he should remain at headquarters. Major Bainbrigge continued to hold the same position till the end of the war in 1814, and surveyed and sketched the country through which the army passed till it entered France. He was present at the battles of Vittoria and Pyrenees, at the last siege of San Sebastian, and at the battles of Nive and Toulouse. Rewards and distinctions were not lavishly bestowed in those days, and, as Major Bainbrigge had not been in action as the head of his department with a division, but under his seniors at headquarters, he did not receive the gold medal, and could not become a companion of the Bath. Through some strange omission he was not recommended for brevet rank, but on 21 Jan. 1817 this was rectified, when he was promoted to the brevet rank of lieutenant-colonel.

In 1815 he applied for employment abroad, and joined the British army in its advance to Paris. When he returned home after the peace, he continued to hold the appointment of permanent assistant quartermaster-general until 1841, when he was made deputy quartermaster-general in Dublin. Having attained the rank of major-general, 9 Nov. 1846, he was appointed by the Duke of Wellington to the command of the Belfast district. In 1852 the duke selected him to command the forces in the island of Ceylon. During his stay in Ceylon his unremitting exertions for the welfare of the troops under his command made him beloved and respected by all classes, and his departure, when promoted to the rank of lieutenant-general on 20 June 1854, was much regretted.

=== Late life ===
In 1838 he was made a companion of the Bath, and subsequently received the 'grant for distinguished service.' On 31 March 1854 he was appointed colonel of the 26th (Cameronian) regiment. For his services in the Peninsula he received the war medal with seven clasps, and on 31 March 1854 he was appointed Knight Commander of the Order of the Bath. He died at St. Margaret's, near Titchfield, Hants, on 20 Dec. 1862, at the age of 76.
