= Carrickfergus Castle =

Norman Castle in Northern Ireland

- Carrickfergus
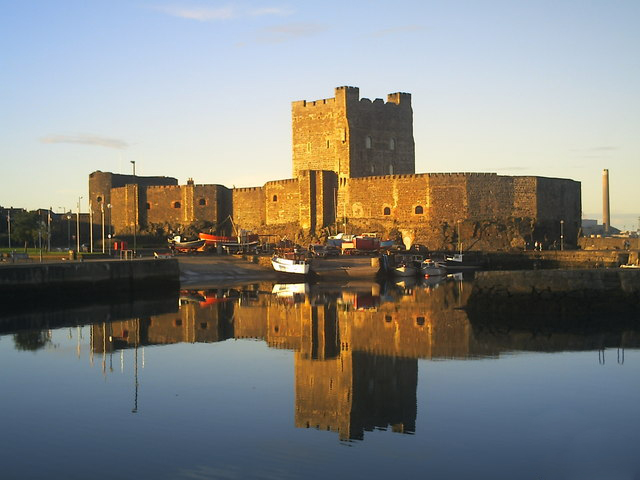
- The castle seen across the harbour

Site information
- Type: castle
- Owner: Department for Communities
- Open to the public: yes

Location
- Location within Northern Ireland
- Coordinates: 54.7133°N 5.8063°W
- Grid reference: J4143 8725

Site history
- Built: 1177
- Built by: John de Courcy
- In use: 1177-1928
- Materials: stone
- Battles/wars: Battle of Carrickfergus (1597), Siege of Carrickfergus (1689), Battle of Carrickfergus (1760), North Channel naval duel, First World War

Garrison information
- Designations: NISMR ANT 052:059

Carrickfergus Castle (from the Irish Carraig Ḟergus or "cairn of Fergus", the name "Fergus" meaning "strong man") is a Norman castle in Northern Ireland, situated in the town of Carrickfergus in County Antrim, on the northern shore of Belfast Lough. Besieged in turn by the Scottish, rebel Irish, English, and French, the castle played an important military role until 1928 and remains one of the best preserved medieval structures in Northern Ireland. It was strategically useful, with three-quarters of the castle perimeter surrounded by water (although in modern times only a third of it is surrounded by water due to land reclamation). Today it is maintained by the Department for Communities as a historic monument in state care.

== Origins ==
Carrickfergus was built by John de Courcy in 1177 as his headquarters, after he conquered eastern Ulster and ruled as a petty king until 1204, when he was ousted by another Norman adventurer, Hugh de Lacy, who was created Earl of Ulster. Initially de Courcy built the inner ward, a small bailey at the end of the promontory with a high polygonal curtain wall and east gate. It had several buildings, including the great hall. From its strategic position on a rocky promontory, originally almost surrounded by sea, the castle commanded Carrickfergus Bay (later known as Belfast Lough), and the land approaches into the walled town that developed beneath its shadow.

== English control ==
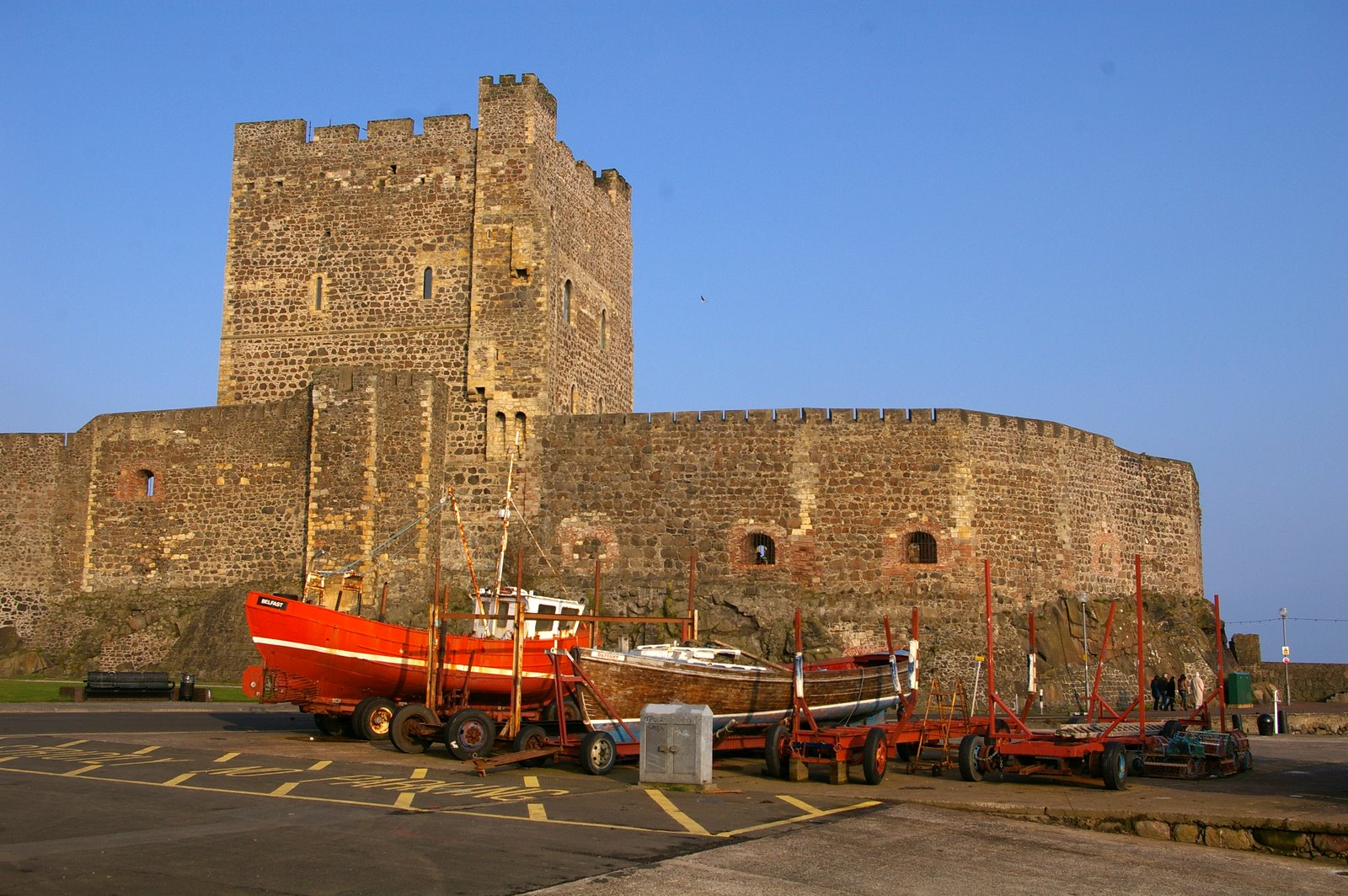
East wall and keep

Lord Edmund Savage of the Ards was Seneschal of Ulster and Constable of Carrickfergus Castle in the late 14th century under Richard II. The castle also appears in the official English records in 1210 when King John laid siege to it and took control of what was then Ulster's premier strategic garrison. Following its capture, constables were appointed to command the castle and the surrounding area. In 1217 the new constable, De Serlane, was assigned one hundred pounds to build a new curtain wall so that the approach along the rock could be protected, as well as the eastern approaches over the sand exposed at low tide. The middle-ward curtain wall was later reduced to ground level in the eighteenth century, save along the seaward side, where it survives with a postern gate and the east tower, notable for a fine array of cross-bow loops at basement level.

A chamber on the first floor of the east tower is believed to have been the castle's chapel on account of its fine Romanesque-style double window surround, though the original chapel must have been in the inner ward. The ribbed vault over the entrance passage, the murder hole and the massive portcullis at either end of the gatehouse are later insertions started by Hugh de Lacey who died in 1248 and did not live to see its completion in around 1250. It was finished by King Henry III.

After the collapse of the Earldom of Ulster in 1333, the castle remained the Crown's principal residential and administrative centre in the north of Ireland. During the early stages of the Nine Years War (1595–1603), when English influence in the north became tenuous, crown forces were supplied and maintained through the town's port. And in 1597, the surrounding country was the scene for the Battle of Carrickfergus.

During the sixteenth and seventeenth centuries improvements were made to accommodate artillery, including externally splayed gunports and embrasures for cannon, though these improvements did not prevent the castle from being attacked and captured on many occasions during this time. Marshal Schomberg besieged and took the castle in the week-long Siege of Carrickfergus in 1689. This is also the place where Schomberg's leader, King William III first set foot in Ireland on 14 June 1690.

In 1760, after fierce fighting in the town, it was surrendered to French invaders under the command of Francois Thurot. They looted the castle and town and then left, only to be caught by the Royal Navy.

== Later use ==
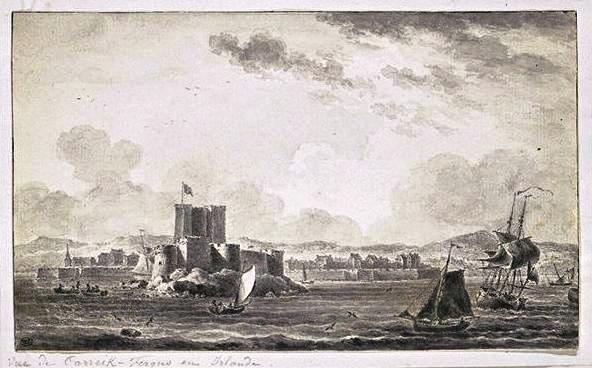
18th century depiction of the castle

In 1778, a small but significant event in the American War of Independence began at Carrickfergus, when John Paul Jones, in the face of reluctance by his crew to approach too close to the Castle, lured a Royal Navy vessel from its moorings into the North Channel, and won an hour-long battle. In 1797 the Castle, which had on various occasions been used to house prisoners of war, became a prison and it was heavily defended during the Napoleonic Wars; six guns on the east battery remain of the twenty-two that were used in 1811.

For a century it remained a magazine and armoury. During the First World War it was used as a garrison and ordnance store and during the Second World War as an air raid shelter.

It was garrisoned continuously for about 750 years until 1928, when its ownership was transferred from the British Army to the new Government of Northern Ireland for preservation as an ancient monument. Many of its post-Norman and Victorian additions were then removed to restore the castle's original Norman appearance. It remains open to the public. The banqueting hall has been fully restored and there are many exhibits to show what life was like in medieval times. It was built and re-built three times, and still stands today.

On the day of his wedding, 29 April 2011, Prince William of Wales was created Duke of Cambridge, Earl of Strathearn, and Baron Carrickfergus. The latter title of peerage, along with the geographical barony itself, had been extinct since Victorian times. The title is now only ceremonial with no official connection to the castle.

== Governors of Carrickfergus ==
Governors of the garrison at Carrickfergus included:

- 1568: William Piers
- 1597: Sir John Chichester (killed near Ballycarry in 1597)
- 1599: Sir Arthur Chichester (created The 1st Baron Chichester in 1613; died in 1625)
- 1606–: Sir Faithful Fortescue and Roger Langford
- 1625–1648: The 1st Viscount Chichester
- 1648: The 1st Earl of Donegall (replaced)
- 1648: General George Monck (for Parliament)
- 1649–1650: Thomas Dalzell of Binns
- 1660–1675: The 1st Earl of Donegall (restored)
- 1675–1687: The 2nd Earl of Donegall
- 1689: Charles Macarty Moore
- 1716: Lord Mark Kerr
- 1728–1732: The 1st Baron Conway
- bef. 1754–: vacant
- 1763: Nehemiah Donnellan
- 8 September 1787: Francis Dundas
- 30 January 1817 – 13 November 1828: Sir Baldwin Leighton
- 1 December 1828 – 22 January 1830: General George Moncrieff.
- 12 February 1830 – 10 June 1841: Lieutenant-General Sir William Hutchinson, K.C.H. (1765–1845)

The post of Governor was abolished in 1841.

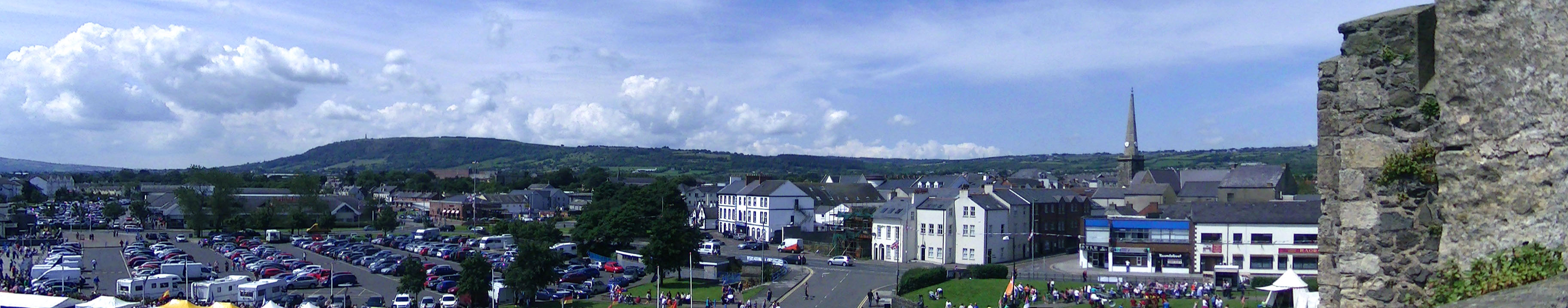
Panoramic view from the castle

== See also ==
- Castles in Great Britain and Ireland
- List of castles in Ireland
