= Sir John Carmichael-Anstruther, 5th Baronet =

British Member of Parliament

Sir John Carmichael-Anstruther, 5th and 2nd Baronet (1 June 1785 – 28 January 1818) was a British Member of Parliament for Anstruther-Easter Burghs between 1811 and 1818. He was the eldest son of Sir John Anstruther of that Ilk, 4th and 1st Bt. (1753–1811) and Maria Isabella Brice. He was educated at Eton and Christ Church, Oxford and admitted to Lincoln's Inn in 1806.

He succeeded to the title of 5th and 2nd Baronet Anstruther, Lanarkshire on the death of his father on 26 January 1811. He inherited the estates of Carmichael and Westraw, Lanarkshire, on the death of his cousin, Andrew Carmichael, 6th Earl of Hyndford on 18 April 1817 and took the additional name of Carmichael.

He died in 1818 from typhus. In 1817 he had married Jessie, the daughter of Major-General David Dewar of Gilston, and had 1 son, John, who was born nine days after his death and who would be fatally shot at Eton school in 1831.

Parliament of the United Kingdom
| Preceded by Sir John Anstruther | Member of Parliament for Anstruther Burghs; 1811–1818 | Succeeded by Alexander Maconochie, Lord Meadowbank |
Baronetage of Nova Scotia
| Preceded by John Anstruther | Baronet (of Anstruther); 1811–1818 | Succeeded by John Carmichael-Anstruther |
Baronetage of Great Britain
| Preceded by John Anstruther | Baronet (of Elie); 1811–1818 | Succeeded by John Carmichael-Anstruther |
