= Balcaskie =

17th-century country house in Fife, Scotland

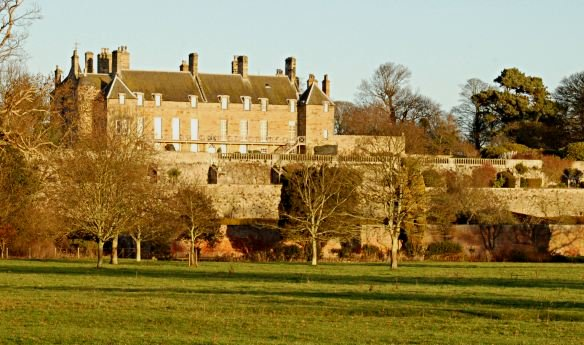
- Balcaskie from the south

- Location within Fife

General information
- Coordinates: 56°13′19″N 2°45′59″W

Design and construction
- Architect: William Bruce

Listed Building – Category A
- Official name: Balcaskie House
- Designated: 1 March 1984
- Reference no.: LB2503

Inventory of Gardens and Designed Landscapes in Scotland
- Official name: Balcaskie
- Designated: 1 July 1987
- Reference no.: GDL00037

Balcaskie is a 17th-century country house in Fife, Scotland. It lies around 2 km north of St Monans, and is notable chiefly as the home and early work of architect Sir William Bruce.

Robert Lorimer, an admirer of Bruce, called the house "the ideal of what a Scottish gentleman's home ought to be". Balcaskie remains the seat of the Chief of the Name and Arms of Anstruther, Tobias Alexander Anstruther of that Ilk.

== History ==
The original Balcaskie House was built shortly before 1629, as the home of the Moncrieffs of Balcaskie, and was a traditional L-plan fortified house of three storeys and attic.

In 1665 the estate was bought by William Bruce, who began enlarging the house for his own use, between 1668 and 1674. In 1668 he acquired a baronetcy in Nova Scotia and became Sir William Bruce.

Bruce planned the new house himself and employed John Hamilton as mason, and Andrew Waddell as wright (carpenter). The house was expanded from the L-plan to an almost symmetrical U-plan, with the original building at the west end. The north front was given matching crow-step gables, with a balustraded two-storey central section. In addition, Bruce added tall corner towers to each angle. These had French-inspired details such as rusticated quoins. Bruce may have built the curving wing-walls and pavilions to the north front, however, these have also been attributed to a later building phase.

The estate was sold in 1684 to Sir Thomas Steuart, when Bruce moved to his new home at Kinross House. In 1698 it changed hands again, becoming the property of Sir Robert Anstruther, whose son Philip undertook works in the mid-18th century, including heightening the central block. It was now that the wing walls and pavilions were added, according to John Gifford. Further alterations were made by William Burn in 1830-32, including a porch and new windows, and a stable block. In 1856-58 David Bryce, an Edinburgh architect, worked on Balcaskie, adding several baronial features.

== Gardens ==
The gardens, to the south of the house, were laid out by William Bruce and are aligned to face the Bass Rock, on the opposite side of the Forth estuary.

The terraces and vista are inspired by French Baroque gardens, such as Vaux-le-Vicomte. The gardens were altered in the 18th century, and restored in 1826-7 by William Burn and William Sawrey Gilpin. Sir Walter Scott visited the gardens in 1827 and described the house as "much dilapidated" but praised the restoration of the gardens.

Parterres were laid out in the 1840s by W. A. Nesfield.

== Bibliography ==
- Gifford, John (1988) The Buildings of Scotland : Fife, Penguin, ISBN 978-0140710779
- Glendinning, Miles, MacInnes, Ranald, & MacKechnie, Aonghus (1996) A History of Scottish Architecture, Edinburgh University Press, ISBN 978-0748608492
