= Anstruther baronets =

Baronetcy in the Baronetage of the United Kingdom

There have been three baronetcies created for members of the Anstruther family, two in the Baronetage of Nova Scotia and one in the Baronetage of Great Britain. Two of the creations are extant while one is extinct.

The Anstruther Baronetcy, of Wrae in the County of Linlithgow and of Balcaskie, Fife and Braemore in the County of Caithness, was created in the Baronetage of Nova Scotia on 28 November 1694 for Robert Anstruther, subsequently Member of Parliament for Fifeshire. The fifth Baronet represented Fifeshire and St Andrews in Parliament. The sixth Baronet was Lord Lieutenant of Fife. The seventh Baronet succeeded his kinsman as twelfth Baronet of Anstruther in 1980 (see below). The titles have remained united ever since.

The Anstruther, later Anstruther-Paterson, later Carmichael-Anstruther, later Anstruther Baronetcy, of Anstruther in the County of Lanark, was created in the Baronetage of Nova Scotia on 6 January 1700 for John Anstruther, Member of Parliament for Anstruther Burghs and Fifeshire. The second and third Baronets also represented Anstruther Burghs in Parliament. The third Baronet married Anne Paterson, daughter of Sir John Paterson, 3rd Baronet, and assumed the additional surname of Paterson. The fifth Baronet succeeded to the Carmichael estates on the death of his kinsman Andrew Carmichael, 6th Earl of Hyndford, in 1817, and assumed the additional name of Carmichael. The eighth Baronet represented Lanarkshire South in Parliament. The eleventh Baronet was succeeded in the baronetcy by his kinsman, Sir Ralph Hugo Anstruther, 7th Baronet, of Wrae, Balcaskie, Fife and Braemore (see above). The titles remained united.

The Anstruther, later Carmichael-Anstruther Baronetcy, of Anstruther in the County of Lanark, was created in the Baronetage of Great Britain on 18 May 1798 for John Anstruther, ten years before succeeding his elder brother as the fourth Baronet in the baronetcy of 1700 (see above). In contrast to his brother he did not assume the surname of Paterson. On the death of the eighth Baronet (the eleventh Baronet of the 1700 creation) in 1980 the baronetcy of 1798 became extinct.

There is also an Anstruther-Gough-Calthorpe baronetcy in the Baronetage of the United Kingdom (1929). William John St Clair Anstruther-Gray was created a baronet in the Baronetage of the United Kingdom 4 July 1956, and created a life peer as Baron Kilmany in 1966.

== Anstruther baronets, of Wrae, Balcaskie, Fife and Braemore (1694) ==
Escutcheon of the Anstruther baronets, of Wrae, Balcaskie, Fife and Braemore

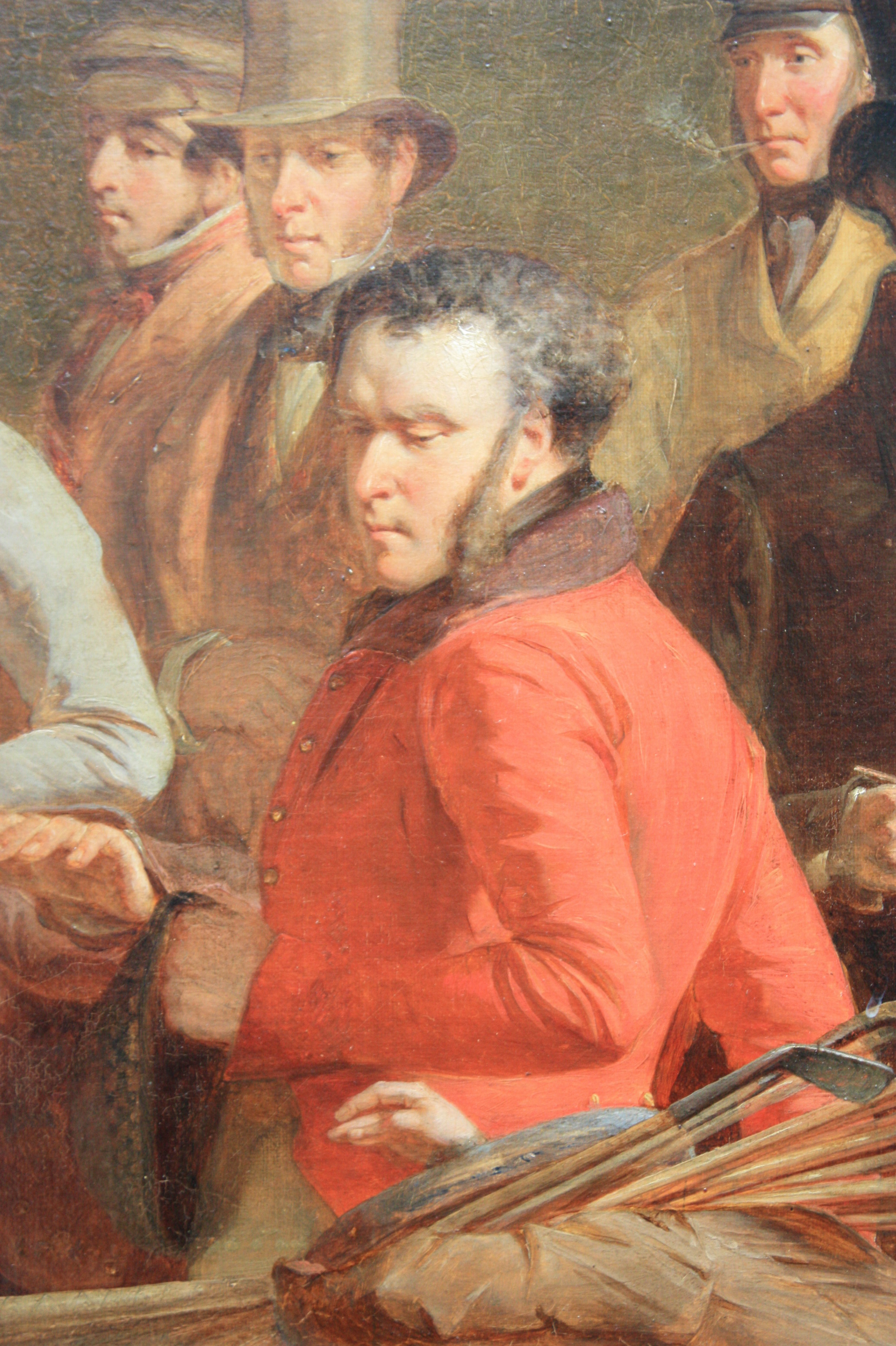
Sir Ralph Abercromby Anstruther (detail from The Golfers by Charles Lee, 1847)

- Sir Robert Anstruther, 1st Baronet (1658–1737)
- Sir Philip Anstruther, 2nd Baronet (1688–1763)
- Sir Robert Anstruther, 3rd Baronet (1733–1818)
- Sir Ralph Abercromby Anstruther, 4th Baronet (1804–1863)
- Sir Robert Anstruther, 5th Baronet (1834–1886)
- Sir Ralph William Anstruther, 6th Baronet (1858–1934)
- Sir Ralph Hugo Anstruther, 7th Baronet (1921–2002) (succeeded as 12th Baronet of the 1700 creation in 1980)
- Sir Ian Fife Campbell Anstruther, 8th Baronet (1922–2007)
- Sir Sebastian Paten Campbell Anstruther, 9th Baronet, 14th Baron of Anstruther (b. 1962)

== Anstruther, later Anstruther-Paterson, later Carmichael-Anstruther, later Anstruther baronets, of Anstruther (1700) ==
- Sir John Anstruther, 1st Baronet (c 1678–1753)
- Sir John Anstruther, 2nd Baronet (1718–1799)
- Sir Philip Anstruther-Paterson, 3rd Baronet (1752–1808)
- Sir John Anstruther, 4th and 1st Baronet (1753–1811) (created a Baronet, of Anstruther in the County of Lanark, in the Baronetage of Great Britain on 18 May 1798)
- Sir John Carmichael-Anstruther, 5th Baronet (1785–1818)
- Sir John Carmichael-Anstruther, 6th Baronet (1818–1831)
- Sir Windham Carmichael-Anstruther, 7th Baronet (1793–1869)
- Sir Windham Charles James Carmichael-Anstruther, 8th Baronet (c. 1825–1898)
- Sir Windham Robert Carmichael-Anstruther, 9th Baronet (1877–1903)
- Sir Windham Frederick Carmichael-Anstruther, 10th Baronet (1902–1928)
- Sir Windham Eric Francis Carmichael-Anstruther, 11th Baronet (1900–1980)
- Sir Ralph Hugo Anstruther, 12th Baronet (1921–2002)

see above for further succession

== Anstruther, later Carmichael-Anstruther baronets, of Anstruther (1798) ==
- Sir John Anstruther, 1st Baronet (1753–1811) (inherited the baronetage created 1700 (see above) in 1808 and baronetcies henceforth united. See 1700 creation list for succession. This 1798 creation became extinct in 1980.

== See also ==
- Anstruther-Gough-Calthorpe baronets
- William Anstruther-Gray, Baron Kilmany
