= Kirkcaldy Burghs by-election =

Kirkcaldy Burghs by-election may refer to one several parliamentary by-elections held in Scotland for the House of Commons constituency of Kirkcaldy Burghs:

- 1841 Kirkcaldy Burghs by-election
- 1862 Kirkcaldy Burghs by-election
- 1875 Kirkcaldy Burghs by-election
- 1892 Kirkcaldy Burghs by-election
- 1921 Kirkcaldy Burghs by-election
- 1944 Kirkcaldy Burghs by-election

== See also ==
- Kirkcaldy Burghs (UK Parliament constituency)
