= Admiral Wemyss (disambiguation) =

Rosslyn Wemyss, 1st Baron Wester Wemyss (1864–1933) was a Royal Navy Admiral of the Fleet.

Admiral Wemyss may also refer to:

- David Wemyss, 4th Earl of Wemyss (1678–1720), Lord High Admiral of Scotland
- James Erskine Wemyss (1789–1854), British Royal Navy rear admiral
