= Henderson baronets =

Baronetcy in the Baronetage of the United Kingdom

There have been two baronetcies created for persons with the surname Henderson, one in the Baronetage of Nova Scotia and one in the Baronetage of the United Kingdom.

The Henderson Baronetcy, of Fordell (agnatic primogeniture) in the County of Fife, was created in the Baronetage of Nova Scotia on 15 July 1664 for John Henderson. The fifth Baronet sat as Member of Parliament for Fife, Kirkcaldy Burghs, Seaford and Stirling Burghs. The title became extinct on the death of the sixth Baronet in 1833.

The Henderson Baronetcy, of Buscot Park in the County of Berkshire, was created in the Baronetage of the United Kingdom on 24 July 1902.

== Henderson baronets, of Fordell (1664) ==
- Sir John Henderson, 1st Baronet (died 1683)
- Sir William Henderson, 2nd Baronet (died 1709)
- Sir John Henderson, 3rd Baronet (1686–c. 1730)
- Sir Robert Henderson, 4th Baronet (died 1781)
- Sir John Henderson, 5th Baronet (1762–1817)
- Sir Robert Bruce Henderson, 6th Baronet (c. 1763–1833)

== Henderson baronets, of Buscot Park (1902) ==
- Baron Faringdon
