= Lord Lieutenant of Fife =

Ceremonial officer in Fife, Scotland

This is a list of people who have served as Lord Lieutenant of Fife.

== Lord Lieutenants ==
- Colin Lindsay, 3rd Earl of Balcarres 1688 – ?
- John Leslie, 10th Earl of Rothes 1746 – ?
- George Lindsay-Crawford, 22nd Earl of Crawford 17 March 1794 – 1807
- Thomas Bruce, 7th Earl of Elgin 7 March 1807 – 1807
- George Lindsay-Crawford, 22nd Earl of Crawford 20 May 1807 – 30 June 1808
- George Douglas, 16th Earl of Morton 18 July 1808 – 1824
- Thomas Erskine, 9th Earl of Kellie 11 June 1824 – 6 February 1828
- James St Clair-Erskine, 2nd Earl of Rosslyn 23 February 1828 – 18 January 1837
- Robert Ferguson 14 February 1837 – 3 December 1840
- Captain James Erskine Wemyss RN 17 December 1840 – 3 April 1854
- James Bruce, 8th Earl of Elgin 22 April 1854 – 20 November 1863
- James Hay Erskine Wemyss 30 January 1864 – 29 March 1864
- Sir Robert Anstruther, 5th Baronet 11 June 1864 – 21 April 1886
- Victor Alexander Bruce, 9th Earl of Elgin 5 August 1886 – 18 January 1917
- Sir William Robertson 21 May 1917 – 27 February 1923
- Sir Ralph Anstruther, 6th Baronet 29 March 1923 – 30 September 1934
- Edward James Bruce, 10th Earl of Elgin 5 January 1935 – 1965
- Sir John McWilliam 20 January 1965 – 7 August 1974
- William Anstruther-Gray, Baron Kilmany 1 January 1975 – 1980
- Sir John Gilmour, 3rd Baronet 28 February 1980 – 1987
- Andrew Bruce, 11th Earl of Elgin 11 December 1987 – 1999
- Margaret Dean 13 September 1999 – 2015
- Robert William Balfour 22 January 2015– present

== Deputy lieutenants ==
A deputy lieutenant of Fife is commissioned by the Lord Lieutenant of Fife. Deputy lieutenants support the work of the lord-lieutenant. There can be several deputy lieutenants at any time, depending on the population of the county. Their appointment does not terminate with the changing of the lord-lieutenant, but they usually retire at age 75.

=== 19th Century ===
- 5 March 1831: Lord William Robert Keith Douglas
- 5 March 1831: Lieutenant General Alexander Bethune
- 5 March 1831: Francis Balfour
- 5 March 1831: Onesiphorus Tyndal Bruce
- 5 March 1831: David Wemyss
- 5 March 1831: John Fergus
- 5 March 1831: Lieutenant-Colonel Thomas Webster
- 5 March 1831: Robert Douglas
- 5 March 1831: John Stuart
- 5 March 1831: Rear Admiral Sir Frederick Lewis Maitland

== See also ==
- Provost of Fife
