= Thomas Hubbard (British politician) =

British coal miner and politician

Member of Parliament for Kirkcaldy Burghs
- In office 17 February 1944 – 18 September 1959
- Preceded by: Tom Kennedy
- Succeeded by: Harry Gourlay

Personal details
- Born: Thomas Frederick Hubbard; October 1898 Kirkcaldy, Fife
- Died: 7 January 1961 (aged 62)
- Party: Labour

Thomas Frederick Hubbard (October 1898 – 7 January 1961) was a British coal miner and politician. He represented Kirkcaldy Burghs in Parliament for fifteen years, being a somewhat low-profile Member but often speaking in support of better conditions for pensioners.

== Origins ==
A native of Kirkcaldy, Hubbard attended only the local elementary school before going to work as a grocer's assistant. During the First World War he enlisted in the Royal Navy, serving throughout the conflict. After the end of the war, he became a miner. He joined the Labour Party shortly after, and in 1922 married Jessie Cooper of Dysart; they had two sons.

== Politics ==
Hubbard was elected to Kirkcaldy Town Council in 1936, and also served on the executive of the Fifeshire Miners' Association. In 1941 he suffered a severe leg injury at work, and retired from mining to become instead an Air-raid shelter superintendent.

== By-election candidate ==
The sitting Labour Member of Parliament (MP) for Kirkcaldy, Tom Kennedy, announced his resignation in January 1944. Hubbard was selected on 22 January to fight the seat at the resulting by-election; he faced opposition from Douglas Young, leader of the Scottish National Party, and a candidate standing as a 'Christian Socialist'. Hubbard won by 1,647 votes.

== Parliament ==
Hubbard only rarely intervened in debate, concentrating on issues he knew well including the Scottish mining industry. In November 1944 he called for a universal state pension of 30s. per week; the rate at the time was 10s./week. From 1946 to 1947, he served as Parliamentary Private Secretary to the Secretary of State for Scotland, Joseph Westwood.

== Pensions ==
A strong supporter of nationalisation, Hubbard regarded economic planning as assuring workers that increased production would not mean increased unemployment. In 1951 he urged that compulsory retirement ages imposed by trade and professional associations be dropped, and that in industry it could be provided that two aged men could do the work of one. He became a vice-president of the British Council of the Old Age Pension Association, and hon. President of the Scottish Old Age Pension Association.

== Health ==
Supporting development of the Fife coalfield, Hubbard argued that it was in "splendid isolation" because the government refused to build a Forth road bridge. His health was not good and in March 1954 he collapsed in the lobby of the House of Commons. Hubbard, a heavy cigarette smoker, was sceptical of the connection to lung cancer and asked in 1957 about the connections between lung cancer and air pollution.

Hubbard retired at the 1959 general election.

Parliament of the United Kingdom
| Preceded by Thomas Kennedy | Member of Parliament for Kirkcaldy Burghs; 1944 – 1959 | Succeeded by Harry Gourlay |
