= Albert Russell =

Albert Russell may refer to:

- Albert Russell, Lord Russell (1884–1975), Scottish politician and jurist
- Albert Russell (director) (1890–1929), American film director
- "Albert" Russell (1887–1961), British cricketer a.k.a. C. A. G. Russell
