= 1796 Stirling Burghs election =

The 1796 Stirling Burghs election was a parliamentary contest of the Stirling Burghs constituency during the 1796 British General election.

The election was fought between Sir John Henderson of Fordell, Provost of Inverkeithing, for the Whigs and Andrew Cochrane-Johnstone for the Tories. It was notable for electoral malpractice including violence and false imprisonment of electors at Kinghorn and Inverkeithing.

== Background ==
Since the Act of Union in 1707, the Burghs of Stirling, Inverkeithing, Queensferry, Dunfermline and Culross made up the Stirling Burghs constituency. Each burgh had one vote and the council (of 20 or so members) elected a delegate or commissioner to represent them at the election in the returning burgh, who would return the majority vote.

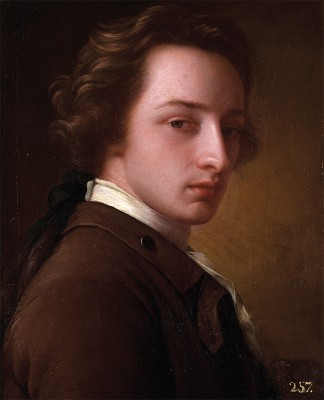
Sir John Henderson, by Gavin Hamilton (1778).

During the previous General election of 1790, the Stirling Burghs constituency was won by Sir Archibald Campbell. Following the death of Campbell, on 4 May 1791 a by-election was held, which was won by the Tory candidate Andrew Cochrane-Johnson.

Cochrane-Johnson would remain the Tory candidate for the 1796 Stirling Burghs election. The Whig candidate for the election was Sir John Henderson of Fordell, who had served as the Provost of Inverkeithing since 1791 and had been MP for Fifeshire (1780), Dysart Burghs (1780–84) and Seaford (1785-6). The two men were cousins, and Henderson had given his support to Cochrane-Johnson during his successful 1791 Stirling Burghs by-election campaign.

== Campaign ==
=== The Battle of Kinghorn ===
Dunfermline Town Council had set 16 June as the date to select its delegate, which was to be held at Inverkeithing. Supporters of Cochrane-Johnstone, including John Hutton, a member of Dunfermline Council who lived in Kinghorn, sought to prevent council members loyal to Henderson from voting. On 13 June, Provost James Moodie, Robert Hutton, William Anderson, and Deacons Charles Anderson and Robert Young were taken to Kinghorn to an inn run by William and Johanna Skinner, known as "Lucky".

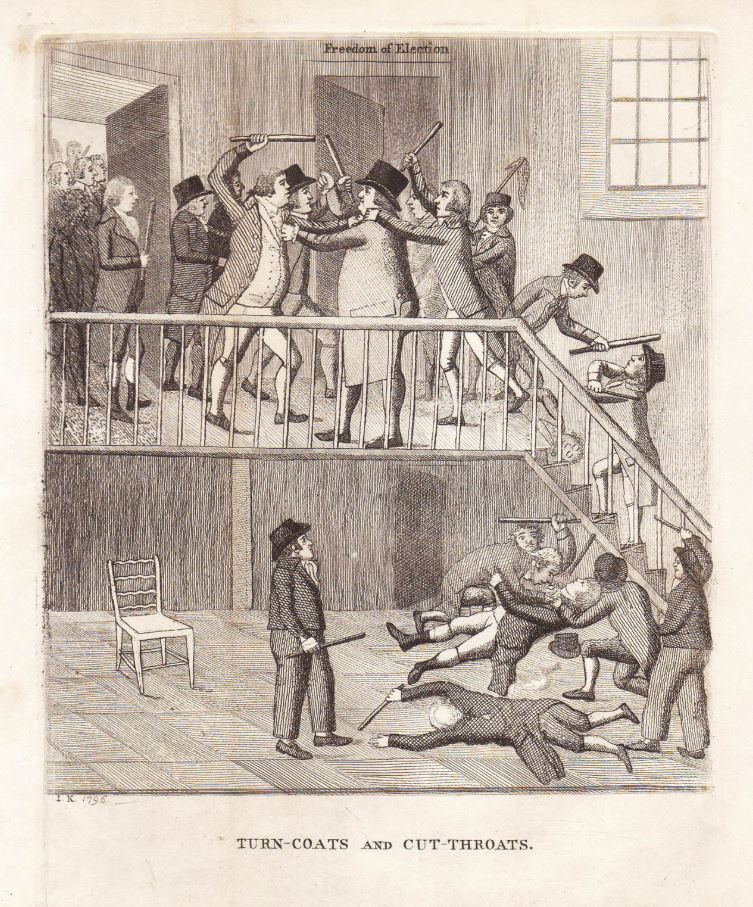
Caricature of The Battle of Kinghorn depicted by John Kay (1846). Col. Erskine and his followers are depicted attacking John Hutton and William Skinner. The figures in the background are likely the beleaguered Provost and his councillors.

Henderson responded by arming and marching weavers and colliers to free the captives and bring them back. They were supported by Col. James Francis Erskine. At the inn a violent confrontation ensued between the captors and Henderson's faction. A few people were seriously injured. This became known as the 'Battle of Kinghorn'.

=== Dunfermline delegate selection ===
On 15 June, the councillors were escorted back to Dunfermline. Unrest and threats of violence against the council continued, encouraged by Sir John Henderson and his supporters, Colonel Erskine and William Wemyss of Cuttlehill.

On the morning of 16 June, the day to select the delegate, the councillors entered the Council Room through the nearby house of John Wilson, a vintner, in an attempt to avoid the crowd outside. They were jostled by the mob, and the Provost read the Riot Act from the Council House door. While the councillors waited to choose their delegate for the election at Inverkeithing, William Wemyss and Alexander Law, a messenger-at-arms, entered the room. Law drew a pistol and threatened to shoot anyone who resisted. He had warrants for the arrest of the five councillors who had been taken to Kinghorn, as well as John Hutton, who had been involved in the incident. The six councillors were taken to Inverkeithing and held in Henderson's jail "black hole". With them removed, only 15 councillors remained. Six left in protest, leaving nine members, who chose Wemyss as delegate. The council later declared this election invalid because there was no legal quorum.

The six councillors were released later that day and returned to Dunfermline. The Provost called another meeting, which was held at 11 p.m. after the Council Room doors had been forced open. Twelve councillors attended and chose Provost James Moodie as their delegate.

== Results and aftermath ==
At the election in Inverkeithing on 20 June, Cochrane Johnstone won by three votes to two. Stirling, Queensferry and Culross voted for Johnstone, while Inverkeithing and Dunfermline voted for Henderson.

Henderson later challenged the result in London but lost his case. Lucky Skinner, the landlady of the Kinghorn inn, gave evidence and became something of a local celebrity for her humorous answers in court.

Cochrane would be made Governor of Dominica in 1797, terminating his position as MP. He would later be found guilty of participation in the Great Stock Exchange Fraud of 1814, and become disgraced from public life.

Henderson would later be elected to the Stirling Burghs constituency and serve between 1806-1807. Henderson would become involved in a 'war of the purses' in the Stirling Burghs constituency, helping to perpetuate the constituency’s reputation for being the most corrupt in Scotland. In 1818 it was widely known that Henderson ‘spent nearly a hundred thousand pounds in a visionary attempt to secure popular influence in these burghs without effect’.
