= Sir John Henderson, 5th Baronet =

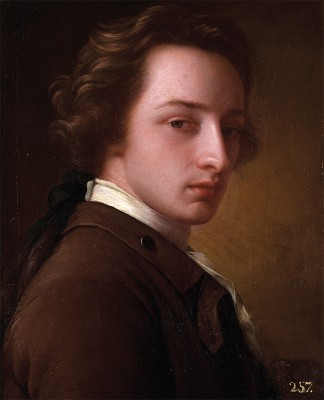
Sir John Henderson of Fordell, by Gavin Hamilton, 1778. Museo de la Real Academia de Bellas Artes de San Fernando.

Sir John Henderson FRSE FSA (8 January 1752 – 12 December 1817), fifth of the Henderson baronets of Fordell, Fife, was a Scottish nobleman and politician. He trained as a lawyer and was also a competent antiquary.

== Ancestry ==
The Hendersons were an ancient Scottish family; James Henderson, who served as Lord Advocate of Scotland and died at Flodden Field in 1513, was called the first "Laird of Fordell". Fordell Castle was built in 1567, but it was built on the site of a previous structure. John Henderson (d. 1683) was created a baronet in 1664.

The Hendersons' considerable wealth came from coalpits on their estates.

== Life ==
Sir John Henderson was the son of Robert Henderson (d. 1781), the 4th baronet. He was educated at University of St Andrews and Christ Church, Oxford. He studied law at St Andrews University graduating in 1764, then did further studies at Oxford University gaining a second degree in 1771 before being made an advocate in 1774. In 1781, on the death of his father, he became a baronet. In January 1782 he became a Fellow of the Society of Antiquaries of Scotland.

In 1784, he was elected a Fellow of the Royal Society of Edinburgh. His proposers were Andrew Dalzell, Cosmo Gordon, and John Mortland.

== Political career ==
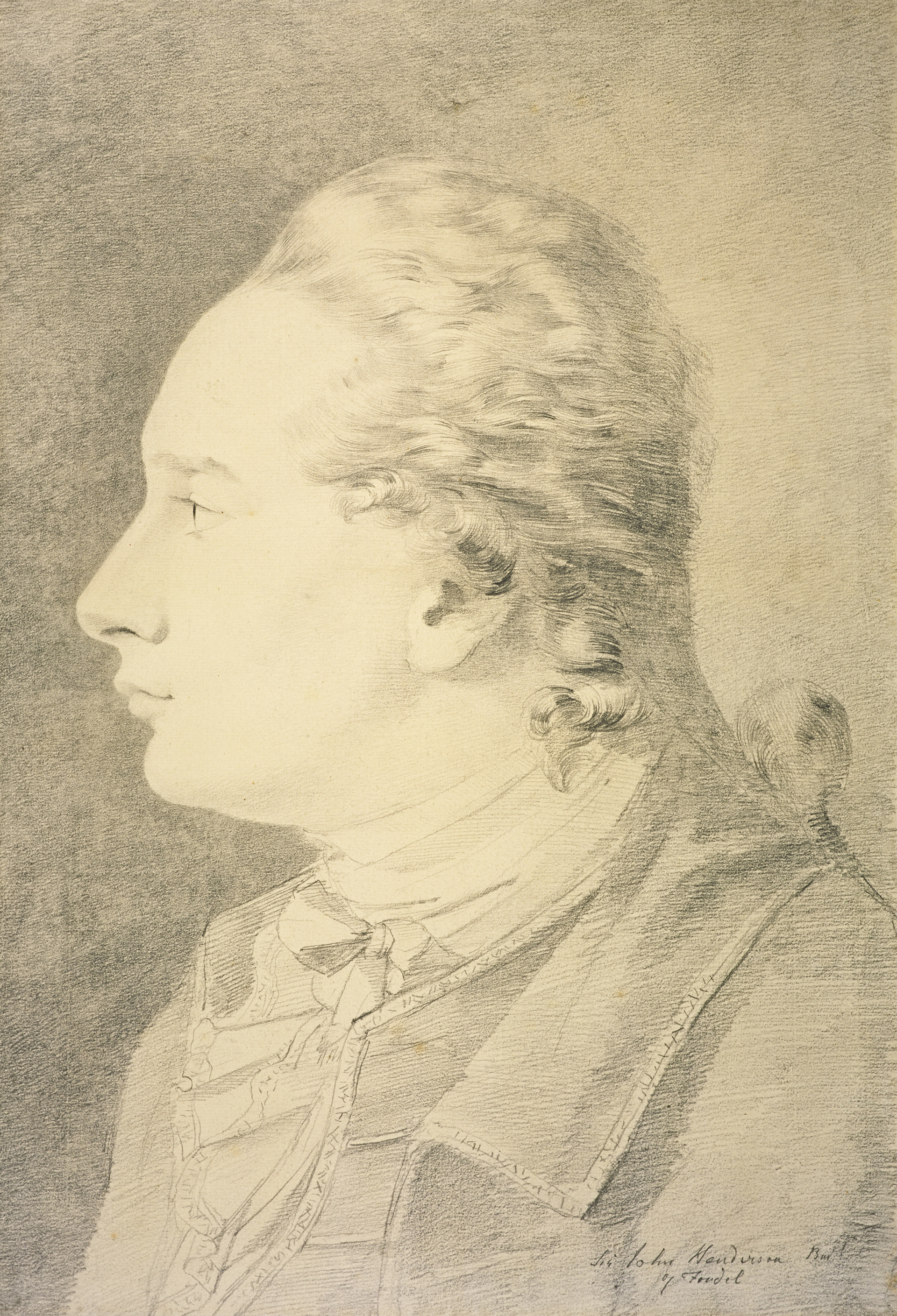
Sir John Henderson of Fordell, by John Brown. 1782. Scottish National Portrait Gallery, Edinburgh.

Henderson served as MP for Fifeshire (1780), Dysart Burghs (1780–84), Seaford (1785-6), and Stirling Burghs (1806-7). Early in his career Henderson was associated with Henry Dundas and supported William Pitt the Younger, but Dundas threw his support to William Wemyss in 1787 and Henderson never forgave him for it.

In the 1796 Stirling Burghs election, Henderson campaigned vigorously his cousin Andrew Cochrane, even though he had supported him In 1791. In an effort to keep unfavorable votes from being cast, Henderson intimidated voters and imprisoned the Provost and some other unfavorable voters at his home in Inverkeithing. Ultimately he was unsuccessful, and Cochrane won.

Henderson became provost of Inverkeithing from 1791 to 1807.

In 1796 Henderson was one of the backers of the Scots Chronicle, a newspaper opposed to the war policy of the Pitt administration.

In 1802 Henderson contested Stirling Burghs against Captain Alexander Cochrane (later an admiral; brother of Andrew) and both names were returned in a disputed election; Cochrane was ultimately seated. Henderson was successfully returned for Stirling Burghs in 1806 with the support of William Grenville and supported his ministry.

== Family ==
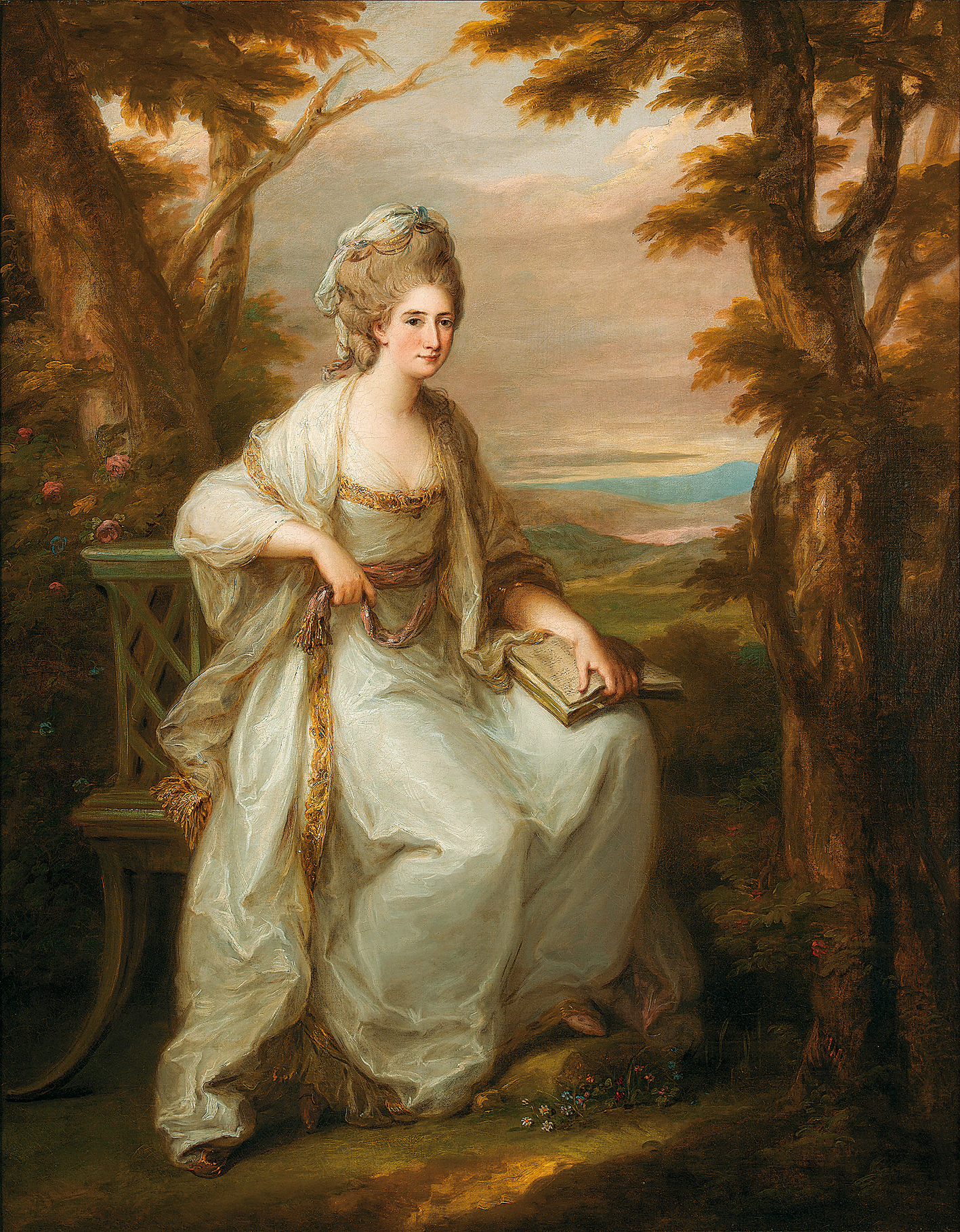
Angelika Kauffmann, Portrait of Anne Loudoun, Lady Henderson of Fordell, 1771

In 1781, he married Anna Loudoun Robertson (d. 1782), daughter of General James Robertson, then serving as governor of the Province of New York. Anna Robertson was painted in 1771 by Angelica Kauffman. His wife died in childbirth of their first and only child, Anne Isabella Henderson (1782-1844), who married Admiral Phillip Durham in 1818. Additional "natural children" were John Francis Wheatley Henderson, Maria Wheatley Henderson, Emilia Elizabeth Henderson, Charlotte Strickland Henderson, and Robert Strickland Henderson.

Henderson was sued by his younger brother Robert Bruce Henderson (c. 1763–1833) over the ownership of Earlshall Castle; after losing the suit, Sir John refused to make up a title for his brother, forcing him to obtain one by decree of a court. Robert Bruce Henderson became the sixth and last Henderson Baronet of Fordell after Sir John's death.

== Artistic recognition ==
Henderson commissioned a bust of himself in 1777 by Christopher Hewetson and a portrait by Gavin Hamilton the next year. Henderson's books and artwork seized with the Westmorland in 1778 were featured in a 2012 book and series of art exhibitions. John Brown's 1782 portrait of Henderson is in the Scottish National Portrait Gallery.

Parliament of Great Britain
Preceded by Robert Skene	Member of Parliament for Fife; February 1780 – September 1780	Succeeded by Robert Skene
Preceded by John Johnstone	Member of Parliament for Dysart Burghs; 1780–1784	Succeeded by Sir Charles Preston, Bt
Preceded by Sir Peter Parker, Bt; Viscount Nevill	Member of Parliament for Seaford; 1785–1786; With: Sir Peter Parker, Bt	Succeeded by Henry Flood; Sir Godfrey Webster, Bt
Parliament of the United Kingdom
Preceded by Alexander Forrester Inglis Cochrane	Member of Parliament for Stirling Burghs; 1806–1807	Succeeded by Alexander Campbell
Baronetage of Nova Scotia
Preceded by Robert Henderson	Baronet (of Fordell); 1781–1817	Succeeded by Robert Bruce Henderson
