= James Hay Erskine Wemyss =

Scottish Member of Parliament

The Honourable James Hay Erskine Wemyss
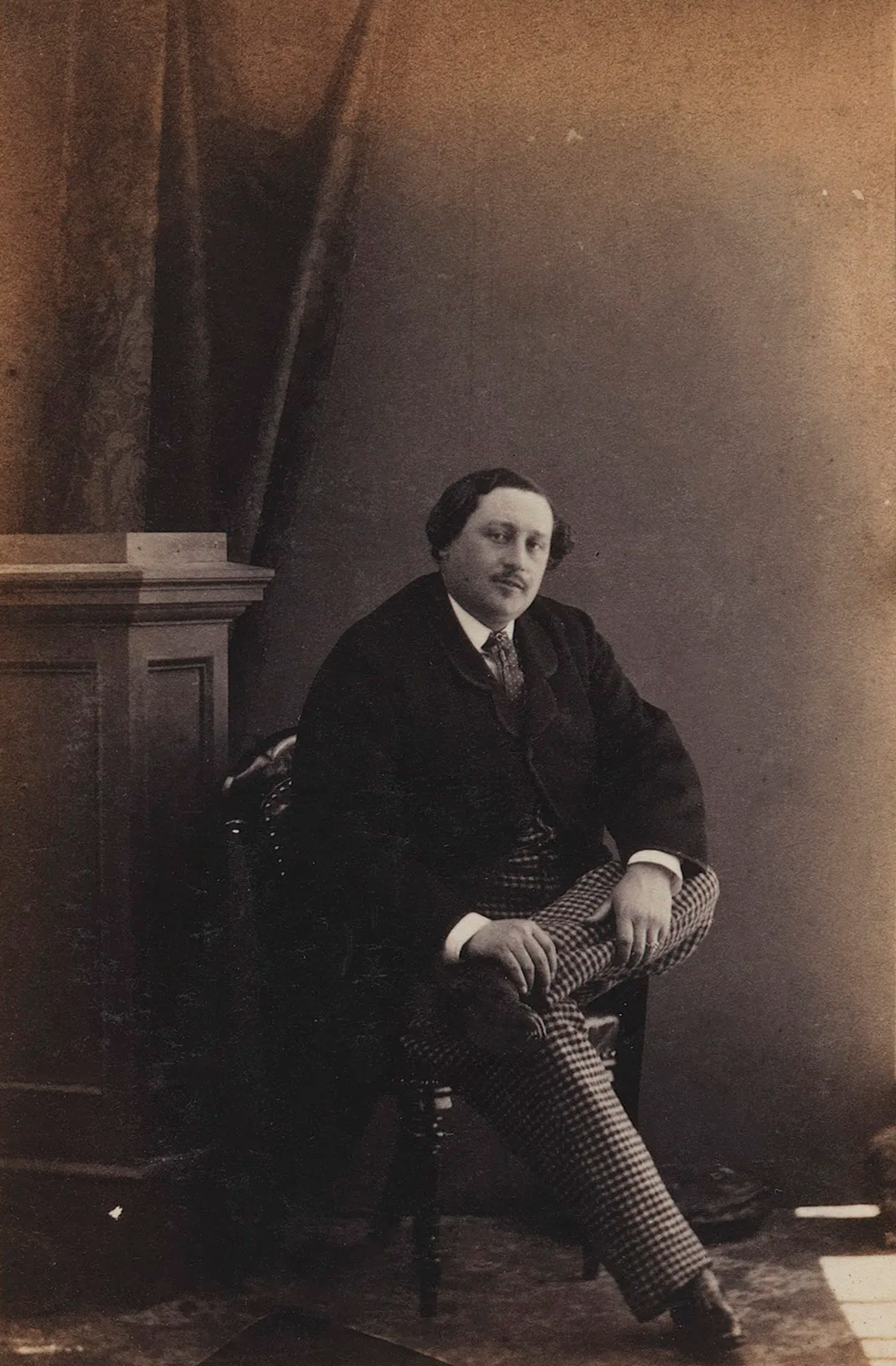
- Portrait by Camille Silvy, 1860

Member of Parliament for Fife
- In office 1859–1864

Personal details
- Born: August 29, 1829 Scotland
- Died: March 29, 1864 (aged 34) Scotland
- Spouse: Millicent Anne Mary Kennedy-Erskine (m. 1855)
- Children: 6, including Randolph and Rosslyn
- Parents: Rear-Admiral James Erskine Wemyss; Lady Emma Hay
- Relatives: William Hay, 18th Earl of Erroll (uncle); Lady Augusta FitzClarence (mother-in-law)
- Occupation: Politician

James Hay Erskine Wemyss (29 August 1829 – 29 March 1864) was a Scottish Member of Parliament, representing Fife from 1859 until his death.

== Early life ==
Erskine-Wemyss was born on 29 August 1829. He was the son of Rear-Admiral James Erskine Wemyss and Lady Emma Hay.

His paternal grandparents were William Wemyss and Frances Erskine (a daughter of Sir William Erskine, 1st Baronet). His maternal grandparents were William Hay, 17th Earl of Erroll and, his second wife, Alicia Eliot (the third daughter of Samuel Eliot, Esq. of Antigua). His uncle, William Hay, 18th Earl of Erroll, married Lady Elizabeth FitzClarence (an illegitimate daughter of King William IV by his mistress Dora Bland).

== Career ==
Like his father and grandfather before him, he was elected a Member of Parliament for Fife at the general election in 1859.

On 5 February 1864, he was appointed Lord Lieutenant of Fife and Sheriff Principal of the shire of Fife, in the room of the Earl of Elgin, deceased.

== Personal life ==
On 17 April 1855, at All Saints' Church, Knightsbridge, he married Millicent Anne Mary Kennedy-Erskine, daughter of the Hon. John Kennedy-Erskine (son of the 1st Marquess of Ailsa) and his wife Lady Augusta FitzClarence (an illegitimate daughter of King William IV of the United Kingdom by his mistress Dora Bland). Their children included

- Mary Frances Erskine Wemyss (1856–1936), who married Cecil Stratford Paget, a son of Gen. Lord George Paget, in 1882.
- Dora Mina Erskine Wemyss (1856–1894), who married Lord Henry Grosvenor, third son of Hugh Grosvenor, 1st Duke of Westminster.
- Randolph Gordon Erskine Wemyss (1858–1908), who inherited the Wemyss estates and is the ancestor of the present Chief of Clan Wemyss.
- Hugo Erskine Wemyss (1861–1933), Comptroller of the Grand Duchess of Mecklenburg's household in Britain.
- Rosslyn Wemyss, 1st Baron Wester Wemyss (1864–1933), who served as First Sea Lord during the First World War.

Erskine Wemyss died on 29 March 1864 and was succeeded in his estates by his eldest son, Randolph.

=== Descendants ===
Through his daughter Dora, he was a grandfather of William Grosvenor, 3rd Duke of Westminster.

Through his son Randolph, he was a grandfather of Michael Erskine-Wemyss, who married Lady Victoria Cavendish-Bentinck, daughter of William Cavendish-Bentinck, 6th Duke of Portland and the last surviving godchild of Queen Victoria until her death in 1994.

== Notes ==
Parliament of the United Kingdom
Preceded by John Fergus	Member of Parliament for Fife; 1859–1864	Succeeded by Sir Robert Anstruther
Honorary titles
Preceded by James Bruce, 8th Earl of Elgin	Lord Lieutenant of Fife; Jan 1864 – Mar 1864	Succeeded by Sir Robert Anstruther, 5th Baronet
