= Tom Kennedy (British politician) =

British Labour politician

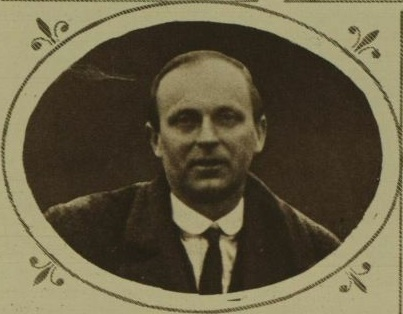
Kennedy in 1921

Thomas Kennedy PC (25 December 1874 – 3 March 1954) was a British Labour politician.

== Biography ==
Kennedy was born in Kennethmont, Aberdeenshire, and became a railway clerk. He joined the Social Democratic Federation (SDF) and soon became its organiser for Aberdeen, standing for Parliament in Aberdeen North in the 1906 and January 1910 general elections. He supported the SDF's formation of the British Socialist Party (BSP) and became its National Organiser in 1913, but in 1914 left to fight in World War I. As a supporter of the War, he left the BSP in 1916 to join the new National Socialist Party. He became the editor of the Social Democrat, successor to Justice.

His first wife, Christian Farquharson, whom he married in 1905, was also a socialist, having attended the International Socialist Congress in Paris in 1900. She died in 1917 and he subsequently remarried.

He was Labour Member of Parliament (MP) for Kirkcaldy Burghs from 1921 to 1922, from 1923 to 1931 and from 1935 to 1944 and also unsuccessfully fought the 1932 Montrose Burghs by-election. He was Scottish Labour Whip in 1921–1922 and from 1923 to 1925. He served in Government as a Lord Commissioner of the Treasury in 1924, in opposition as Deputy Chief Whip (1925–1927) and Chief Whip of the Labour Party (1927–1931) and again in Government as Parliamentary Secretary to the Treasury from 1929 to 1931.

He was appointed a Privy Counsellor in the 1931 New Year Honours.

He died on 3 March 1954.

Parliament of the United Kingdom
Preceded by James Dalziel	Member of Parliament for Kirkcaldy Burghs; 1921 – 1922	Succeeded by Robert Hutchison
Preceded by Robert Hutchison	Member of Parliament for Kirkcaldy Burghs; 1923 – 1931	Succeeded by Albert Russell
Preceded by Albert Russell	Member of Parliament for Kirkcaldy Burghs; 1935 – 1944	Succeeded by Thomas Hubbard
Political offices
Preceded by Bolton Eyres-Monsell	Parliamentary Secretary to the Treasury; 1929–1931	Succeeded by David Margesson
