= Robert Munro Ferguson =

Scottish politician

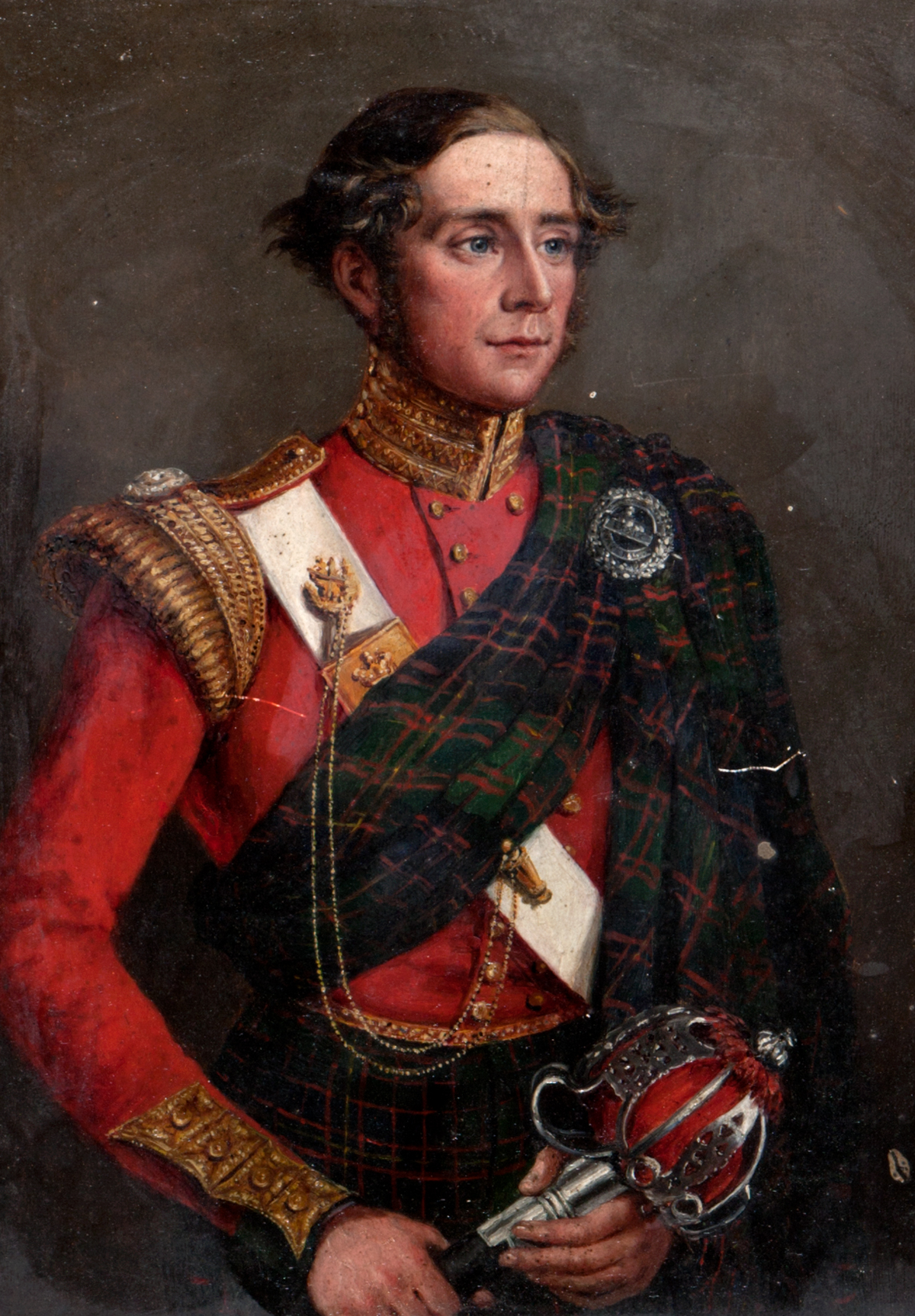
Robert Ferguson

Robert Munro Ferguson (born Robert Ferguson; 20 August 1802 – 27 or 28 November 1868) was a Scottish Liberal politician who sat in the House of Commons from 1841 to 1862.

An officer in the 79th Regiment of Foot, he rose to become colonel of the regiment and eventually an army general. He was son of Ronald Craufurd Ferguson and Jane Munro, the daughter of Hector Munro, 8th Laird of Novar and grew up in Muirton, Fife.

Ferguson was elected as the Member of Parliament (MP) for Kirkcaldy Burghs at a by-election in 1841. He lived at no.5 Bolton Row, London. He was a member of the Athenaeum and Reform Clubs.

In politics he supported the Liberal agenda. He wanted electoral reform, male suffrage and the secret ballot. He supported Triennial fixed parliaments. He voted for revision of the Corn Laws and Income tax. He wished for abolition of the tax on knowledge, voting for universal schooling. He was in favour of diluting the prelacy, redistributing to local vicars and disestablishment.

He was re-elected unopposed at the next 4 general elections, and at the 1859 election he held the seat with a narrow majority over his Liberal opponent William Vernon Harcourt (who later became Chancellor of the Exchequer). Ferguson resigned his seat in the House of Commons in 1862, by the procedural device of accepting appointment as Steward of the Manor of Hempholme.

In 1841 he inherited his father's Raith estate in Fife. In 1864, Ferguson inherited the baronies of Novar in Ross-shire and Muirton, Morayshire, conditional upon his taking the additional surname Munro. He died at the age of 66. His son, Ronald Munro Ferguson, 1st Viscount Novar, served as Governor-General of Australia and Secretary of State for Scotland.

His tomb lies on a hillside above Raith Lake.

Parliament of the United Kingdom
Preceded by Robert Ferguson	Member of Parliament for Kirkcaldy Burghs; 1841–1862	Succeeded by Roger Sinclair Aytoun
