= Robert Preston Bruce =

British politician (1851 – 1893)

The Honourable Robert Preston Bruce DL (4 December 1851 – 8 December 1893) was a British Liberal Party politician.

Born in Canada East, Bruce was the second son of James Bruce, 8th Earl of Elgin and his second wife, Lady Mary Louisa Lambton, daughter of the 1st Earl of Durham. He was educated at Eton College and Balliol College, Oxford, where he took second-class honours in classics. He was a captain in the Fifeshire Artillery Militia from 1877 to 1881 and was a J.P. and deputy lieutenant for Fifeshire.

Bruce was elected at the 1880 general election as the Member of Parliament (MP) for Fife. When the seat was divided under the Redistribution of Seats Act 1885 he stood and was elected unopposed for the new Western division of Fife. He was re-elected unopposed in 1886, and resigned his seat on 21 June 1889 by becoming Steward of the Manor of Northstead.

Parliament of the United Kingdom
Preceded by Sir Robert Anstruther, Bt	Member of Parliament for Fife; 1880 – 1885	Constituency divided (see East Fife and West Fife)
New constituency	Member of Parliament for West Fife; 1885 – 1889	Succeeded by Augustine Birrell
