= Robert Skene (British Army officer) =

British Army officer and politician

Lieutenant-General Robert Skene (1719–1787) was a British Army officer and politician who sat in the House of Commons between 1779 and 1787.

== Early life ==
Skene was the eldest son of David Skene of Pitlour or Hallyards, and his wife Jean Douglas, daughter of John Douglas of Strathendry, Fife. He was a cousin of Adam Smith.

== Army career ==
Skene joined the army and was an ensign in the 19th Foot in 1743 and lieutenant in 1745. He succeeded to his father’s estates in 1747. In 1756 he became a captain in a newly formed regiment, the 59th Foot. He was lieutenant-colonel and deputy adjutant-general for North Britain in 1758 and adjutant general in 1763. From 1767 to 1789 he was inspector of roads in the Highlands. He became Colonel in 1772, Major-general in 1777 and Lieutenant-general in 1782. He was also Colonel of the short lived 99th Foot (Jamaica) from 1781 to 1783 and Colonel of the 48th Foot from 1783 to his death.

== Political career ==
Skene was intending to stand for Parliament at Fife at a by-election on 2 July 1776, supported by John Campbell, 5th Duke of Argyll, but gave his interest to James Townsend Oswald against John Henderson. When Oswald resigned in 1779 Skene was returned as Member of Parliament at a by-election on 2 July 1779. However Henderson petitioned that he was disqualified by his office of inspector of roads and he was unseated on 7 February 1780. Skene was returned for Fife unopposed at the 1780 general election. He supported North’s Administration until its fall. He was re-elected in a contest at the 1784 general election in spite of opposition from Henderson and the Dundas interest. He continued to vote against the Government until his death. In Parliament he was considered an authority on road bills, but he is not known to have made a speech in Parliament.

Skene died unmarried on 19 May 1787.

Parliament of Great Britain
Preceded by James Townsend Oswald	Member of Parliament for Fife; 1779–1780	Succeeded by John Henderson
Preceded by John Henderson	Member of Parliament for Fife; 1780–1787	Succeeded by William Wemyss
Military offices
Preceded by William Alexander Sorrell	Colonel of the 48th Regiment of Foot; 1783–1787	Succeeded by Patrick Tonyn
