= Fergusonite =

Sulfate mineral series

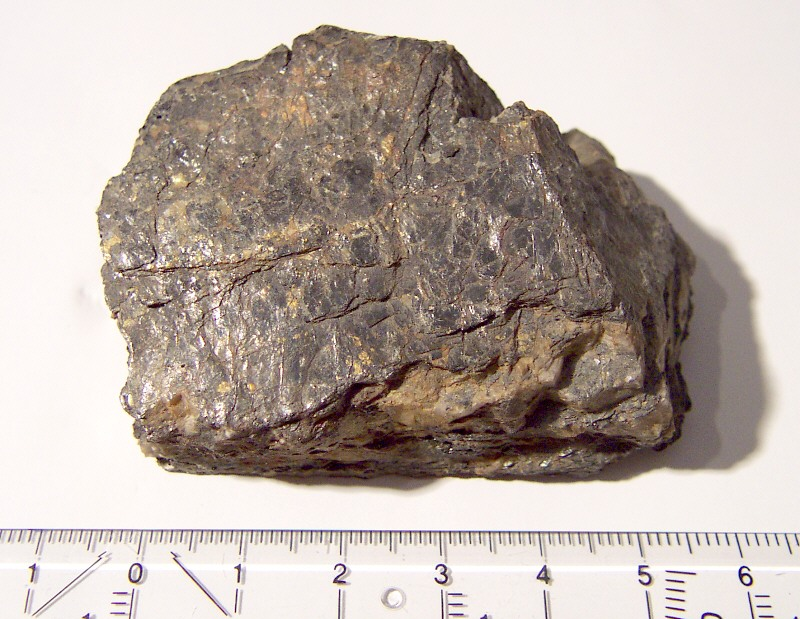

General
- Category: Oxide minerals
- Formula: REENbO_{4} (REE: rare-earth element)
- IMA symbol: Fgs
- Strunz classification: 7.GA.05
- Crystal system: Tetragonal
- Crystal class: Dipyramidal (4/m); H-M symbol: (4/m)
- Space group: I4_{1}/a

Identification
- Formula mass: 245.81 g/mol (Y)
- Color: Black, black, brown, gray, yellow
- Crystal habit: Metamict – mineral originally crystalline, now amorphous due to radiation damage
- Cleavage: Indistinct
- Fracture: Subconchoidal – fractures developed in brittle materials characterized by semi-curving surfaces
- Mohs scale hardness: 5.5–6
- Luster: Submetallic
- Streak: Brown
- Density: 4.3–5.8, average = 5.05
- Refractive index: 2.05–2.19, isotropic
- Other characteristics: Nonmagnetic, non-fluorescent, non-radioactive

Fergusonite is a mineral comprising a complex oxide of various rare-earth elements. The general chemical formula of fergusonite is (Y,REE)NbO_{4}, where REE = rare-earth elements in solid solution with Y. Yttrium is usually dominant (the mineral in this case being referred to as fergusonite-(Y)), but sometimes Ce or Nd may be the major rare-earth component (in fergusonite-(Ce) and fergusonite-(Nd), respectively). The other rare-earth elements are present in smaller amounts, and tantalum sometimes substitutes for some of the niobium. There are fergusonite-beta-(Nd), fergusonite-beta-(Y), fergusonite-beta-(Ce) forms too, but they are classified as 4.DG.10 in the Nickel–Strunz system. The mineral has tetragonal crystal symmetry and the same structure as scheelite (calcium tungstate, CaWO_{4}), but can be metamict (amorphous) due to radiation damage from its small content of thorium. It is found as needle-like or prismatic crystals in pegmatite. It was named after British politician and mineral collector Robert Ferguson of Raith (1767–1840).

== See also ==
- List of minerals
- List of minerals named after people
