= Henry Dalziel, 1st Baron Dalziel of Kirkcaldy =

British newspaper proprietor

The Right Honourable The Lord Dalziel of Kirkcaldy PC
- Henry Dalziel, 1890s

Member of Parliament for Kirkcaldy Burghs
- In office 1892–1921
- Preceded by: Sir George Campbell
- Succeeded by: Thomas Kennedy

Personal details
- Born: James Henry Dalziel; 24 April 1868 Borgue, Kirkcudbrightshire, Scotland
- Died: 15 July 1935 (aged 67) Hove, Sussex, England
- Party: Scottish National Party (after 1934)
- Other political affiliations: Liberal (before 1922); National Party of Scotland (1922–1934)
- Spouse: Amy Thackery (m. 1928)
- Parent: James Dalziel (father)
- Education: Borgue Academy; Shrewsbury High School
- Alma mater: King's College, London
- Occupation: Politician, journalist, newspaper proprietor

James Henry Dalziel, 1st Baron Dalziel of Kirkcaldy, PC (24 April 1868 – 15 July 1935), known as Sir Henry Dalziel, Bt, between 1918 and 1921, was a British newspaper proprietor, Liberal politician and supporter of David Lloyd George.

== Background and education ==
Dalziel was born in Borgue, Kirkcudbrightshire, the son of James Dalziel (died 1904), a shoemaker. He was educated at Borgue Academy, Shrewsbury High School, and King's College London.

== Career ==
Originally a journalist, Dalziel became Member of Parliament (MP) for Kirkcaldy Burghs in 1892. He was also an outspoken advocate of home rule for Scotland, Ireland and Wales. After his retirement he joined the National Party of Scotland.

In 1914 he became sole owner of Reynolds's News, in which he had long had a financial interest. He also bought the Pall Mall Gazette in 1917 and the same year was given the Freedom of the City of Kirkcaldy. Lloyd George made him chairman and political director of the Daily Chronicle in 1918. He sold all his newspaper interests in 1922.

== Honours ==
Dalziel was knighted in 1908, and appointed to the Privy Council in 1912. He was created a Baronet, of Brooklands, Chobham, in the County of Surrey, in 1918. Dalziel was raised to the peerage as Baron Dalziel of Kirkcaldy, of Marylebone in the County of London, in the 1921 Birthday Honours.

== Personal life ==
Lord Dalziel of Kirkcaldy married Amy (née Thackery), widow of Donald Macreae, in July 1928 at the British Embassy in Paris. They had no children. He died in July 1935, aged 67, whereupon the baronetcy and barony became extinct.

Parliament of the United Kingdom
Preceded by Sir George Campbell	Member of Parliament for Kirkcaldy Burghs; 1892 – 1921	Succeeded by Tom Kennedy
Media offices
Preceded by William Thompson	Editor of Reynold's News; 1907 – 1920	Succeeded by J. Crawley
Peerage of the United Kingdom
New creation	Baron Dalziel of Kirkcaldy; 1921 – 1935	Extinct
Baronetage of the United Kingdom
New creation	Baronet (of Brooklands, Chobham, in the County of Surrey); 1918 – 1935	Extinct
