= George Campbell (civil servant) =

Scottish Liberal Party politician and Indian administrator

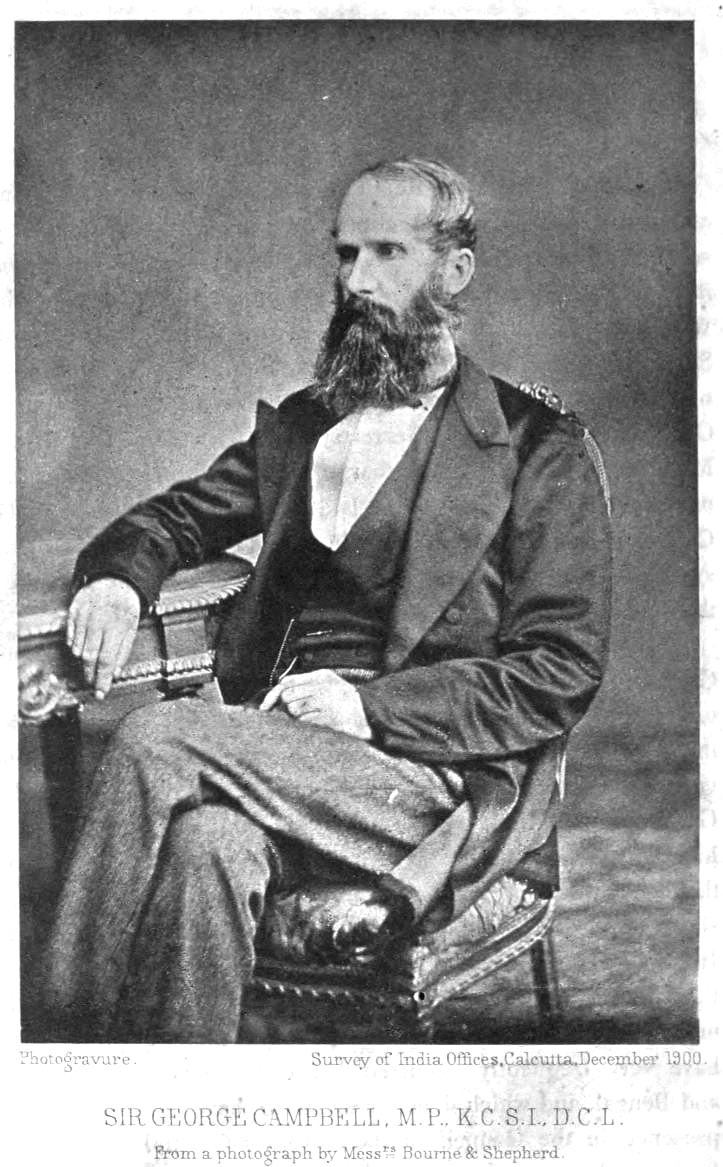
Portrait

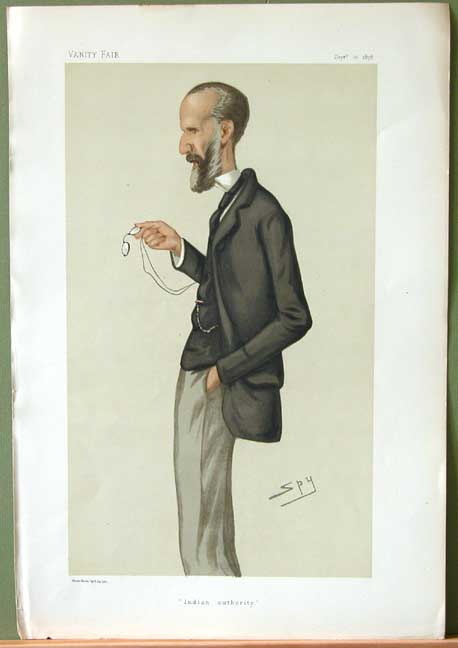
"Indian authority". Caricature by Spy published in Vanity Fair in 1878.

Sir George Campbell, KCSI, DCL (1824 – 18 February 1892) was a Scottish member of the Indian Civil Service, holding a variety of administrative positions, acting as a judge of the High Court, Calcutta, and rising at the end of his career to the position of Lieutenant-Governor of Bengal. He was a barrister, and author on Irish and Indian land tenure, and on the government of India. He was a Liberal Party politician and, post-India, for seventeen years member of parliament for Kirkcaldy Burghs.

== Biography ==
George Campbell was born in 1824, the eldest son of Sir George Campbell, of Edenwood, whose brother became the 1st Baron Campbell. He was educated at Edinburgh Academy and the University of St Andrews.

He was appointed to the Bengal Civil Service from Haileybury in 1842, and, making the voyage round the Cape in a P. and O. Steamer, arrived in India on 25 December 1842. He served in Rohilkhand in subordinate revenue and judicial appointments from 1843 to 1846; was in charge of several districts and political Divisions of the Cis-Sutlej states from 1846 to 1851, and was mentioned with special praise by Lord Dalhousie. While on furlough from 1851 to 1854 he was called to the Bar at Inner Temple in 1854, and became an Associate of the Court of Queen's Bench, and published Modern India (dedicated to his uncle, then Lord Chief Justice of England) and India as it may be. He married in 1854 while at home. He was Magistrate-Collector of Azimghur, 1854; Commissioner of Customs, North-Western Provinces, 1855; Commissioner of the Cis-Sutlej states, 1855-7: took an active part as Civil Commissioner in some events of the Indian Rebellion of 1857 and was present at several engagements; was Personal Assistant to Lord Canning, 1857-8: and judicial and financial Commissioner of Oudh, 1858. It was unusual promotion that brought him from Oudh to be a Judge of the High Court, Calcutta, 1863-66. He was President of the Orissa Famine Commission, 1866-67, and Chief Commissioner of the Central Provinces, 1867-8. While on furlough in 1868-70 he became a candidate for Dumbartonshire in the Liberal interest, but retired from his candidature before the general election: he then published his work on Irish Land Tenure, and was made a Doctor of Civil Law of the University of Oxford.

=== Lieutenant-Governor of Bengal ===
From 1871 to 1874 George Campbell was Lieutenant-Governor of Bengal. His appointment was, as he has himself recorded, a surprise. He was on furlough and, "failing anything that he cared for," on the eve of retirement. Late in the autumn of 1870, he received the offer from the Secretary of State for India, the Duke of Argyll, between whom and the Governor-General of India, Lord Mayo, the selection was arranged.

An early issue for the new Lieutenant-Governor was unrest amongst the Santal people, who had grievances about land tenure and the imposition of rack-rents, arising inter alia from the extension of Government of India Acts to Santal villages. Campbell negotiated powers to appoint officers to make a settlement of land rights issues, to restore dispossessed tenants, to settle rents and to record the customs and usages of the people. Regulations were made to introduce a usury law limiting the accumulation of interest on debts, and to provide some discretion of Government to introduce or withdraw the application of laws as found desirable from time to time.

Campbell was responsible for provincial finance reform, devolving responsibility for the control of expenditure to local government, where previously it had been under the control of central government. He introduced The Bengal Road Cess Act of 1871, which imposed a property-based tax, the revenues of which were dedicated to the improvement of, primarily, road infrastructure, and the budgets for which were under local control. Other transport innovation of his time included the establishment of Port Trust Commissioners for the port of Kolkata, who effected considerable improvements to port infrastructure, efficiency and revenues raised; and the letting of a contract for the manufacture of the first Howrah Bridge, a pontoon structure, linking Howrah and Kolkata.

The early period of his office saw three events speaking to opposition to the Raj. On 20 September 1871, John Paxton Norman, acting chief Justice of the Calcutta High Court was assassinated, stabbed to death by an Indian Wahabi, Mohammad Abdullah, in what appears to have been a political act. On 8 February 1872, the Governor-General of India, Richard Bourke, 6th Earl of Mayo, was assassinated, again by stabbing, by an apparently disgruntled convict, Sher Ali Afridi, a former Afghan soldier who had been convicted for murdering a relative. Sandwiched between these two events, a punitive expedition was mounted to rescue British subjects captured by members of the Mizo people - called Lushais - and to convince the hill tribes of the region that they had nothing to gain and everything to lose by placing themselves in a hostile position towards the British Government.

During his tenure the Pabna Disturbances occurred. With his proclamation on 4 July 1873 during the Pabna Peasant Uprisings, guaranteeing government support of peasants against excessive zamindar demands he ensured that the protest remained peaceful, at the same time antagonising the landlords and his namesake George Campbell, 8th Duke of Argyll at that time Secretary of State for India.

A contemporary assessment of Campbell and his time leading Bengal notes that he represented a revolution of root-and-branch administration; but at the same time, left Bengal with very little goodwill, because of the uncompromising nature of his temper, his contentious tone, his tendency to disputation, and an unwillingness to compromise. Whilst he stood foremost amongst the Bengal Lieutenant-Governors, he was the least popular.

=== Post-India career ===
George Campbell was Member of Parliament (MP) for Kirkcaldy Burghs from 1875 to his death in 1892. Campbell's biographers in the Oxford Dictionary of National Biography assert that "his failure as a politician was complete":

The retired proconsul's discordant tones and self-importance—the subject of covert mockery in official Bengal—incurred open derision at Westminster, where he spoke, or tried to speak, far too often. He was 'positively and literally hooted as I have never heard a man hooted in the House of Commons', wrote H. W. Lucy.

He published a number of major works in the post-India period of his life, as well as contributions in the Quarterly Ethnological Journal and the Journal of the Asiatic Society of Bengal.

=== Family, death ===
Campbell married, in 1853, Laetitia Maria Vibart, daughter of John Gowan Vibart, of the Bengal civil service, and left several children. Lady Campbell died in London 21 October 1901, aged 68.

Their eldest son, Major George Campbell (ca. 1861–1902), died while serving with the 8th King's Regiment in the Second Boer War in South Africa.

George Campbell contacted influenza and died on 18 February 1892 in Cairo, where he was buried.

== Works ==
- Modern India (1852)
- India As It May Be (1853)
- The Irish Land (1869)
- Specimens of Languages of India (1874) - as editor
- A Handy Book on the Eastern Question (1876)
- The Afghan Frontier (1879)
- The Tenure of Land in India, in Systems of Land Tenure in Various Countries pp.213-290 (1881)
- The British Empire (1887)
- The American People, or, The Relations Between the White and the Black (1889)
- Memoirs of my Indian Career (1893) - published posthumously, edited by Charles E. Bernard
  - volume I
  - volume II

Government offices
Preceded by Sir William Grey	Lieutenant-governor of Bengal; 1870–1874	Succeeded by Sir Richard Temple
Parliament of the United Kingdom
Preceded by Robert Reid	Member of Parliament for Kirkcaldy Burghs; 1875 –1892	Succeeded by James Dalziel
