= Harry Gourlay =

Scottish politician

Deputy Chairman of Ways and Means
- In office 1 November 1968 – 2 July 1970
- Speaker: Horace King
- Preceded by: Sydney Irving
- Succeeded by: Betty Harvie Anderson

Lord Commissioner of the Treasury
- In office 7 July 1966 – 1 April 1967
- Prime Minister: Harold Wilson
- Preceded by: William Whitlock
- Succeeded by: William Whitlock

Member of Parliament for Kirkcaldy Kirkcaldy Burghs (1959–74)
- In office 8 October 1959 – 20 April 1987
- Preceded by: Thomas Hubbard
- Succeeded by: Lewis Moonie

Personal details
- Born: Harry Philip Heggie Gourlay; 10 July 1916
- Died: 20 April 1987 (aged 70)
- Party: Labour
- Education: Kirkcaldy High School
- Occupation: Vehicles examiner

Harry Philip Heggie Gourlay (10 July 1916 – 20 April 1987) was a Scottish Labour Party politician.

== Early life and career ==
Gourlay was educated at Kirkcaldy High School and was a vehicles examiner.

== Political career ==
He served as a councillor on Kirkcaldy Town Council and Fife County Council from 1946 and was a governor of Dundee College of Education and a member of his local hospital board.

Gourlay contested South Angus in 1955. He was member of parliament for Kirkcaldy Burghs (and then Kirkcaldy) from 1959 until he died in office shortly prior to the 1987 general election (at which he was to retire), Dr. Lewis Moonie was elected as his successor.

Gourlay was a Government Whip and a Deputy Speaker from 1964-1970.

Parliament of the United Kingdom
Preceded by Thomas Hubbard	Member of Parliament for Kirkcaldy Burghs; 1959 – February 1974	Constituency abolished
New constituency	Member of Parliament for Kirkcaldy; February 1974 – 1987	Succeeded by Lewis Moonie
