= Roger Sinclair Aytoun =

Scottish politician

Roger Sinclair Aytoun (18 February 1823 – 1904) was a Scottish Liberal politician who sat in the House of Commons from 1862 to 1874.

== Biography ==
Aytoun was born in Edinburgh, the son of John Aytoun of Inchdairnie, Fifeshire and his wife Margaret Anne Jeffery, daughter of J. Jeffery M.D. He was educated at Trinity College, Cambridge graduating B.A. in 1845 and M.A. in 1848. He was a deputy lieutenant and J.P. of Fifeshire.

In 1862 Aytoun was elected member of parliament for Kirkcaldy Burghs. He held the seat until 1874.

Aytoun died at the age of 81 on either New Year's Day (1 January) or 14 May 1904.

Parliament of the United Kingdom
Preceded by Robert Ferguson	Member of Parliament for Kirkcaldy Burghs; 1862–1874	Succeeded by Robert Reid
