= Robert Reid (Kirkcaldy Burghs MP) =

Liberal Party politician

Robert Reid MP

Member of Parliament for Kirkcaldy Burghs
- In office 31 January 1874 – 30 March 1875
- Preceded by: Roger Sinclair Aytoun
- Succeeded by: George Campbell

Personal details
- Born: 1831
- Died: 30 March 1875 (aged 43)
- Party: Liberal

Robert Reid (1831 – 30 March 1875) was a Liberal Party politician.

He was elected Liberal MP for Kirkcaldy Burghs in 1874 but died less than a year into the role in 1875.

Parliament of the United Kingdom
Preceded by Roger Sinclair Aytoun	Member of Parliament for Kirkcaldy Burghs; 1874 – 1875	Succeeded by George Campbell
