= Lewis Moonie =

British politician (born 1947)

The Right Honourable The Lord Moonie

Parliamentary Under-Secretary of State for Defence
- In office 31 January 2000 – 13 June 2003
- Prime Minister: Tony Blair
- Sec. of State: Geoff Hoon
- Preceded by: Peter Kilfoyle
- Succeeded by: Ivor Caplin

Member of the House of Lords
- Lord Temporal
- Life peerage 22 June 2005 – 28 April 2022

Member of Parliament for Kirkcaldy
- In office 11 June 1987 – 11 April 2005
- Preceded by: Harry Gourlay
- Succeeded by: Constituency Abolished

Personal details
- Born: 25 February 1947 (age 79) Dundee, Scotland
- Party: Independent (2019–); Labour Co-operative (until 2019)
- Spouse: Sheila Ann Burt
- Education: University of Edinburgh; University of St Andrews

Lewis George Moonie, Baron Moonie (born 25 February 1947) is a British politician. He was the Labour Co-operative Member of Parliament (MP) for Kirkcaldy from 1987 to 2005.

== Early life ==
He attended the Grove Academy in Dundee. He studied medicine at the Bute Medical School, University of St Andrews graduating with a MB ChB in 1970. In 1981 he graduated from the University of Edinburgh with a MSc in community medicine. He also became DPM in 1975, MRCPsych in 1979 and MFCM in 1984. From 1982 to 1986, he was a councillor on Fife Regional Council.

=== Medical career ===
From 1973 to 1975 he was a trainee registrar in psychiatry. From 1975 to 1980 he was a research clinical pharmacologist and a medical advisor in the pharmaceutical industry in Switzerland, the Netherlands and Edinburgh. From 1980 to 1984, he was a trainee in community medicine for the Fife Health Board, becoming a Community Medicine Specialist from 1984 to 1987.

== Parliamentary career ==
He was elected at the 1987 general election as Member of Parliament (MP) for Kirkcaldy, and served until he retired from the House of Commons at the 2005 general election. He served as a junior minister at the Ministry of Defence.

On 13 May 2005 it was announced that he would be created a life peer, and on 22 June 2005 the peerage was gazetted as Baron Moonie, of Bennochy in Fife.

=== The 'Cash for Influence' Scandal ===
In late-January 2009 The Sunday Times involved Lord Moonie in a classic 'sting operation'. Along with three other Labour peers, Lord Moonie was approached by a reporter. Of the four, Lord Moonie was the only one subsequently cleared by the House of Lords Sub-committee on Lords' Interests.

In the newspaper sting, "Moonie said he would contact Healey and offered to identify people who could put down an amendment." He quoted an annual fee for his assistance of £30,000. Lord Moonie is quoted as saying "I did not agree to amend the legislation. I agreed to seek to help to find a way of trying to amend the legislation."

The House of Lords Sub-committee on Lords' Interests was asked to report on the matter. It found that "on the standard of proof that we have set, we do not find that Lord Moonie expressed a clear willingness to breach the Code by promoting amendments on behalf of lobbyists in return for payment."

The Lords' Privileges Committee considered the sub-committee's report. It published its findings on 14 May 2009. It agreed that Lord Moonie had not breached the code.

== Personal life ==
He married Sheila Ann Burt on 28 December 1971. They have two sons.

Parliament of the United Kingdom
| Preceded by Harry Gourlay | Member of Parliament for Kirkcaldy; 1987 – 2005 | Constituency abolished |
Orders of precedence in the United Kingdom
| Preceded by The Lord Jones of Cheltenham | Gentlemen; Baron Moonie | Followed by The Lord Smith of Finsbury |
