= Sir Robert Anstruther, 5th Baronet =

British politician (1834–1886)

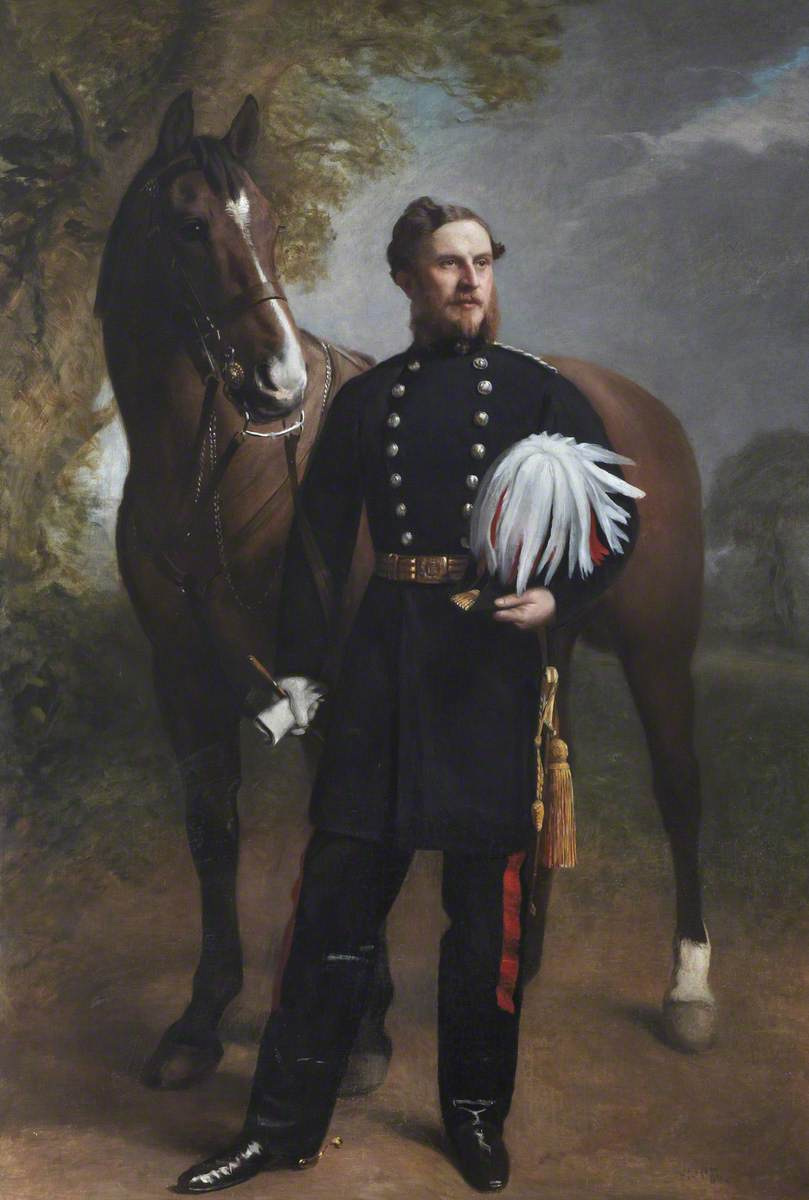
Portrait by Charles Lutyens (1866)

Sir Robert Anstruther, 5th Baronet (28 August 1834 – 21 July 1886) was a Scottish Liberal Party politician who sat in the House of Commons between 1864 and 1886.

== Life and career ==
Anstruther was the son of Sir Ralph Anstruther, 4th Baronet and his wife Mary Jane Torrens, eldest daughter of Major-General Sir Henry Torrens, K.C.B. Anstruther was educated at Harrow School and joined the Grenadier Guards, reaching the rank of lieutenant-colonel. In 1863, on the death of his father, he succeeded to the baronetcy. He was Lord Lieutenant of Fife from 1864 to 1886 and was Deputy Lieutenant and J.P. for Caithness.

Anstruther was Member of Parliament for Fife from 1864 to 1880 and for St Andrews Burghs from 1885 to 1886.

== Marriage and issue ==
Anstruther married Louisa Maria Chowne Marshall, daughter of Reverend William Knox Marshall and Louisa Marsh, on 29 July 1857 at Beckenham, Kent. Their children included Sir Ralph Anstruther, who succeeded to the baronetcy, Henry Torrens Anstruther who was elected to his father's constituency and Admiral Robert Anstruther.

Parliament of the United Kingdom
Preceded by James Hay Erskine Wemyss	Member of Parliament for Fife; 1864–1880	Succeeded by Robert Preston Bruce
Preceded by Stephen Williamson	Member of Parliament for St Andrews Burghs; 1885–1886	Succeeded by Henry Torrens Anstruther
Honorary titles
Preceded by James Hay Erskine Wemyss	Lord Lieutenant of Fife; 1864–1886	Succeeded by The Earl of Elgin
Baronetage of Nova Scotia
Preceded by Ralph Abercromby Anstruther	Baronet (of Wrae, Linlithgowshire, Balcaskie, Fife & Braemore, Caithness); 1863–1886	Succeeded by Ralph Anstruther
