= Kirkcaldy (UK Parliament constituency) =

UK Parliament constituency (1974–2005)

- Former county constituency for the House of Commons
- Boundary of Kirkcaldy in Scotland for the 2001 general election
- Major settlements: Kirkcaldy

February 1974–2005
- Seats: One
- Created from: Kirkcaldy Burghs
- Replaced by: Kirkcaldy and Cowdenbeath; Glenrothes

Kirkcaldy was a county constituency of the House of Commons of the Parliament of the United Kingdom in Fife, returning one Member of Parliament (MP). It existed from the February 1974 election until its abolition in 2005.

== History ==
This was a safe Labour seat throughout its existence.

== Boundaries ==
1974–1983: The burghs of Buckhaven and Methil, Burntisland, Kinghorn, and Kirkcaldy, the district of Kirkcaldy (except the electoral divisions of Markinch North and Markinch South) and the district of Wemyss (except the electoral divisions of Kennoway and Scoonie).

1983–1997: The Kirkcaldy District electoral divisions of Auchtertool/Linktown/Invertiel, Bennochy/Chapel/Cluny, Bennochy/Dunearn, Buckhaven/East Wemyss, Burntisland/Kinghorn, Dunnikier, Gallatown/Dysart/Coaltown of Wemyss/Thornton, Hayfield/Kirkcaldy Central, and Smeaton/Sinclairtown.

1997–2005: The Kirkcaldy District electoral divisions of Buckhaven, Thornton and Wemyss; Burntisland and Auchtertool; Dunearn and Torbain; Dunnikier and Fair Isle; Dysart and Gallatown; Hayfield and Bennochy; Kinghorn and Linktown; Pathhead, Sinclairtown and Smeaton; and Raith and Valley.

The constituency was centred on the town of Kirkcaldy. It was created at the February 1974 election, mostly replacing Kirkcaldy Burghs. In 2005 the seat was abolished, being mostly replaced by Kirkcaldy and Cowdenbeath with a small portion becoming part of Glenrothes.

== Members of Parliament ==
Election	Member	Party	Notes
Feb 1974	Harry Gourlay	Labour	Previously MP for Kirkcaldy Burghs from 1959. Deputy Chairman of Ways and Means 1968–1970. Died April 1987
1987	Lewis Moonie	Labour Co-operative	
2005	constituency abolished: see Kirkcaldy and Cowdenbeath & Glenrothes		

== Elections ==
=== Elections in the 1970s ===
General election February 1974: Kirkcaldy
Party	Candidate	Votes	%	±%
Labour	Harry Gourlay	22,469	47.0	
Conservative	Arthur John Armstrong Bell	13,087	27.3	
SNP	Roger Thompson Knox	12,311	25.7	
Majority		9,382	19.7	
Turnout		47,867	79.4	
Labour win (new seat)				

General election October 1974: Kirkcaldy
Party	Candidate	Votes	%	±%
Labour	Harry Gourlay	20,688	45.4	−1.6
SNP	Roger Thompson Knox	14,587	32.0	+6.3
Conservative	Robert Jones	7,539	16.5	−10.8
Liberal	Fergus Gray Young	2,788	6.1	New
Majority		6,101	13.4	−6.3
Turnout		45,602	75.0	−4.4
Labour hold		Swing		

General election 1979: Kirkcaldy
Party	Candidate	Votes	%	±%
Labour	Harry Gourlay	25,449	53.9	+8.5
Conservative	Jean Hazel Stewart	12,386	26.2	+9.7
SNP	Andrew Currie	9,416	19.9	−12.1
Majority		13,063	27.7	+14.3
Turnout		47,251	77.4	+2.4
Labour hold		Swing		

=== Elections in the 1980s ===
General election 1983: Kirkcaldy
Party	Candidate	Votes	%	±%
Labour	Harry Gourlay	15,380	40.3	−10.4
Conservative	Iain Walker	10,049	26.3	−2.8
SDP	Malcolm Black	9,274	24.3	New
SNP	David Wood	3,452	9.1	−11.0
Majority		5,331	14.0	−13.7
Turnout		53,078	71.9	−5.5
Labour hold		Swing		

General election 1987: Kirkcaldy
Party	Candidate	Votes	%	±%
Labour Co-op	Lewis Moonie	20,281	49.6	+9.3
Conservative	Iain Mitchell	8,711	21.3	−5.0
SDP	David Stewart	7,118	17.4	−6.9
SNP	Roger Mullin	4,794	11.7	+2.6
Majority		11,570	28.3	+14.3
Turnout		53,439	76.5	+4.6
Labour hold		Swing		

=== Elections in the 1990s ===
General election 1992: Kirkcaldy
Party	Candidate	Votes	%	±%
Labour Co-op	Lewis Moonie	17,887	46.0	−3.6
SNP	Stewart Hosie	8,761	22.5	+10.8
Conservative	Stephen Wosley	8,476	21.8	+0.5
Liberal Democrats	Sue Leslie	3,729	9.6	−7.8
Majority		9,126	23.5	−4.8
Turnout		38,853	74.8	−1.7
Labour hold		Swing	−7.2	

General election 1997: Kirkcaldy
Party	Candidate	Votes	%	±%
Labour Co-op	Lewis Moonie	18,730	53.6	+8.0
SNP	Stewart Hosie	8,020	22.9	+0.3
Conservative	Charlotte Black	4,779	13.7	−8.4
Liberal Democrats	John Mainland	3,031	8.7	−1.0
Referendum	Victor Baxter	413	1.2	New
Majority		10,710	30.7	+7.6
Turnout		34,973	66.5	−8.3
Labour hold		Swing	+3.8	

=== Elections in the 2000s ===
General election 2001: Kirkcaldy
Party	Candidate	Votes	%	±%
Labour Co-op	Lewis Moonie	15,227	54.1	+0.5
SNP	Shirley-Anne Somerville	6,264	22.2	−0.7
Conservative	Scott Campbell	3,013	10.7	−3.0
Liberal Democrats	Andrew Weston	2,849	10.1	+1.4
Scottish Socialist	Douglas Kinnear	804	2.9	New
Majority		8,963	31.9	+1.2
Turnout		28,157	54.6	−11.9
Labour hold		Swing	+0.6	
