= John Fergus (politician) =

British Whig politician (1796–1865)

Member of Parliament for Fife
- In office 12 August 1847 – 5 May 1859
- Preceded by: James Erskine Wemyss
- Succeeded by: James Hay Erskine Wemyss

Member of Parliament for Kirkcaldy Burghs
- In office 14 January 1835 – 26 July 1837
- Preceded by: Robert Ferguson
- Succeeded by: Robert Ferguson

Personal details
- Born: c. 1796
- Died: 23 January 1865
- Party: Whig

John Fergus (c. 1796 – 23 January 1865) was a British Whig politician.

Fergus was first elected Whig MP for Kirkcaldy Burghs at the 1835 general election and held the seat until 1837 when he did not seek re-election. He returned to parliament as an MP for Fife in 1847, holding the seat until 1859, when he retired.

Parliament of the United Kingdom
Preceded by Robert Ferguson	Member of Parliament for Kirkcaldy Burghs; 1835–1837	Succeeded by Robert Ferguson
Preceded by James Erskine Wemyss	Member of Parliament for Fife; 1847–1859	Succeeded by James Hay Erskine Wemyss
