= Albert Russell, Lord Russell =

Scottish politician, lawyer and judge

Albert Russell, Lord Russell (1884 – 12 May 1975) was a Scottish Unionist Party politician, lawyer, and judge.

Russell was educated at Glasgow Academy and the University of Glasgow.

He was elected Member of Parliament for Kirkcaldy Burghs in 1931 but lost his seat to Labour in 1935. He served as Solicitor General for Scotland from 29 November 1935 to 25 June 1936. From 1936 to 1960 he served as a Lord of Session, gaining the judicial title Lord Russell.

== Sources ==
- Leigh Rayment's Historical List of MPs
- https://web.archive.org/web/20170203065452/http://www.leighrayment.com/misc/lordofsessions.htm

Parliament of the United Kingdom
Preceded by Tom Kennedy	Member of Parliament for Kirkcaldy Burghs; 1931 – 1935	Succeeded by Tom Kennedy
Legal offices
Preceded by Thomas Cooper	Solicitor General for Scotland; 1935–1936	Succeeded by James Reid
