= 1921 Kirkcaldy Burghs by-election =

UK Parliamentary by-election

- 4 March 1921

Candidate	Kennedy	Lockhart
Party	Labour	National Liberal
Popular vote	11,674	10,199
Percentage	53.4%	46.6%
MP before election
Dalziel
Liberal
Subsequent MP
Hutchison
National Liberal

The 1921 Kirkcaldy Burghs by-election was held on 4 March 1921. The by-election was held due to the resignation of the incumbent Coalition Liberal MP, Henry Dalziel. It was won by the Labour candidate Tom Kennedy.

Kirkcaldy Burghs by-election, 1921
Party		Candidate	Votes	%	±%
	Labour	Tom Kennedy	11,674	53.4	New
C	Liberal	Robert Cook Lockhart	10,199	46.6	N/A
Majority			1,475	6.8	N/A
Turnout			21,873	65.6	N/A
	Labour gain from Liberal		Swing	N/A	
C indicates candidate endorsed by the coalition government.
