= Robert Ferguson of Raith =

Scottish politician and geologist (1769–1840)

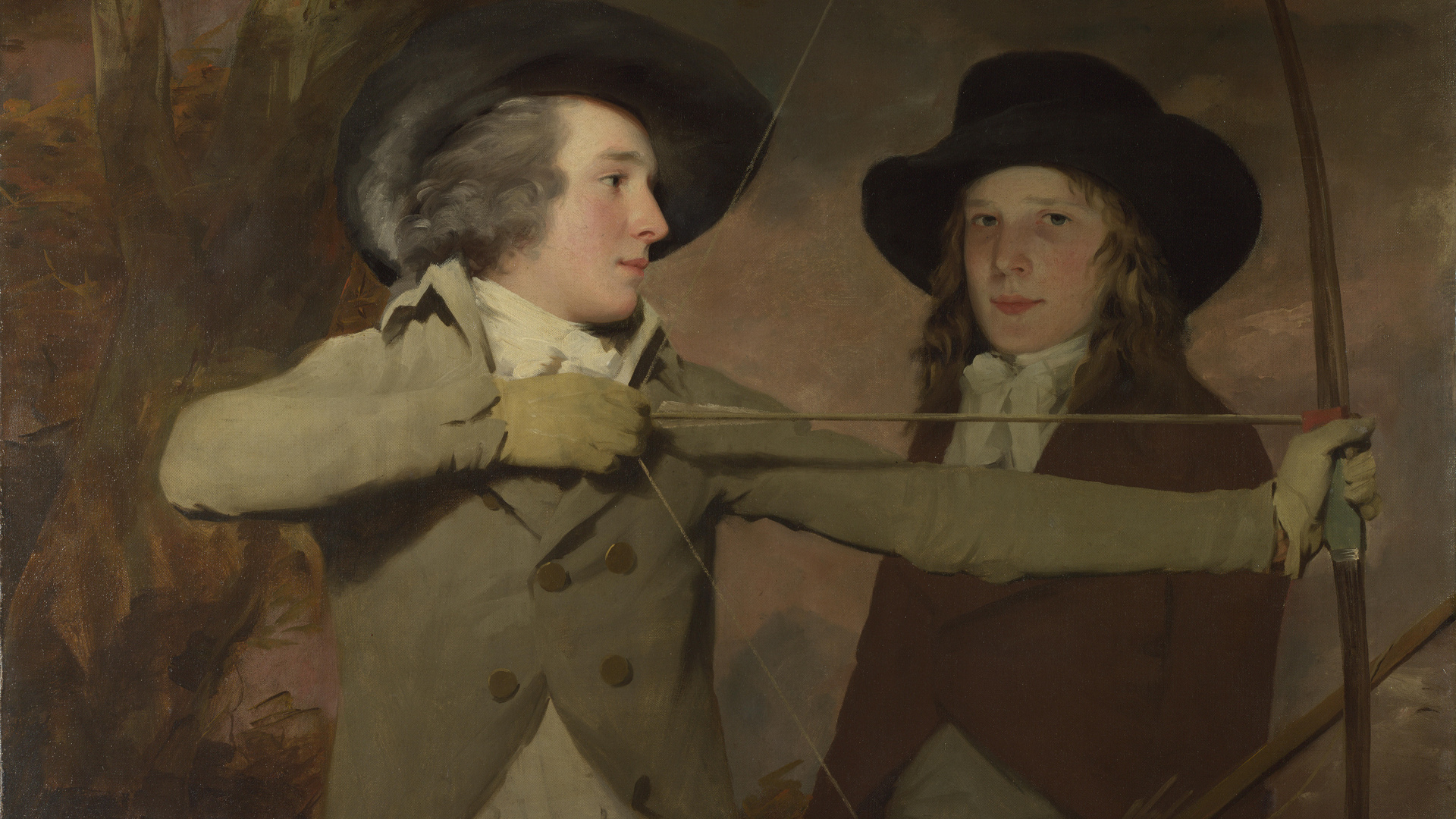
The Archers by Sir Henry Raeburn illustrates Robert with his brother Ronald

Robert Ferguson FRS FRSE FGS (8 September 1769 – 3 December 1840) of Raith, was at various times a Whig Member of Parliament for Fifeshire, Haddingtonshire and Kirkcaldy Burghs, and at the time of his death he was Lord Lieutenant of the county of Fife.

As an amateur geologist and mineralogist the mineral Fergusonite was named after him.

== Biography ==
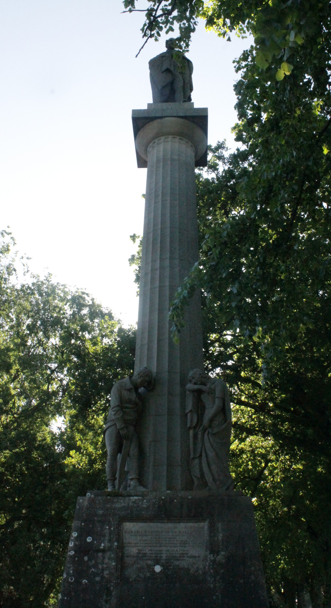
Monument to Robert Ferguson of Raith, Haddington

Robert Ferguson was the eldest son of Jane Crauford, daughter of Ronald Craufurd of Restalrig, (sister to Margaret, countess of Dumfries) and William Ferguson of Raith, Fife. General Sir Ronald Craufurd Ferguson was his brother. He was educated at the High School in Edinburgh, 1777–1780. He was also privately tutored by John Playfair. He then studied law at the University of Edinburgh. He qualified as an advocate in 1791.

He lived at Raith House near Kirkcaldy.

Robert Ferguson was elected to the Whig parliament of 1806 for Fifeshire, but was not afterwards elected until the time of the Reform Bill, upon which he represented the Kirkcaldy district of Burghs from 1831 to 1835, and in the latter year was returned for Haddingtonshire, defeating Mr Hope, the Tory candidate, by 268 to 231 votes. At the general election of 1837 he was in turn defeated by Lord Ramsay, who polled 299 votes to 205. He then returned to the representation of the Kirkcaldy division of Burghs. He was a cordial supporter of the measures of the Whig government, and opposed to the ballot.

Due to his amateur interests in mineralogy, in 1805 he was elected a Fellow of the Royal Society of London. In 1806 he was elected a Fellow of the Royal Society of Edinburgh. He was Lord Lieutenant of Fife from 1837.

He died at a house in Portman Square in London on 3 December 1840.

== Memorials ==
A major monument to Ferguson stands near the northern approach to Haddington designed by Robert Forrest in 1843.

A memorial also exists to him in Abbotshall Church in Fife.

== Family ==
Ferguson infamously had an affair with Mary Bruce, Countess of Elgin, only daughter of William Hamilton Nisbet, esq. of Dirleton, near Haddington. She was the wife of Thomas Bruce, 7th Earl of Elgin. The Earl sued Ferguson in both England and Scotland and won £10,000 (the current, 2016, equivalent of around £5 million). After the Earl divorced her, Ferguson married her on 20 April 1808.

The couple had no children together. His nephew Robert Munro Ferguson (1802-1868) inherited his estates on his death.

Ferguson was first cousin to writer Mary Berry.

== Recognition ==
Sir Henry Raeburn painted Ferguson in his youth (with his brother Ronald behind) in the picture "The Archers".

There are two Raith Monuments erected in his memory, one in Fife and the other in Haddington. They were both designed by Robert Forrest.

Parliament of the United Kingdom
Preceded by Sir William Erskine, Bt	Member of Parliament for Fife; 1806–1807	Succeeded by William Wemyss
Preceded by Lord Loughborough	Member of Parliament for Dysart Burghs; 1831–1832	constituency abolished
New constituency	Member of Parliament for Kirkcaldy Burghs; 1832–1835	Succeeded by John Fergus
Preceded by James Balfour	Member of Parliament for Haddingtonshire; 1835–1837	Succeeded by Lord Ramsay
Preceded by John Fergus	Member of Parliament for Kirkcaldy Burghs; 1837–1840	Succeeded by Robert Ferguson
