= Rosslyn Wemyss, 1st Baron Wester Wemyss =

Royal Navy officer (1864–1933)

Admiral of the Fleet The Right Honourable The Lord Wester Wemyss GCB CMG MVO
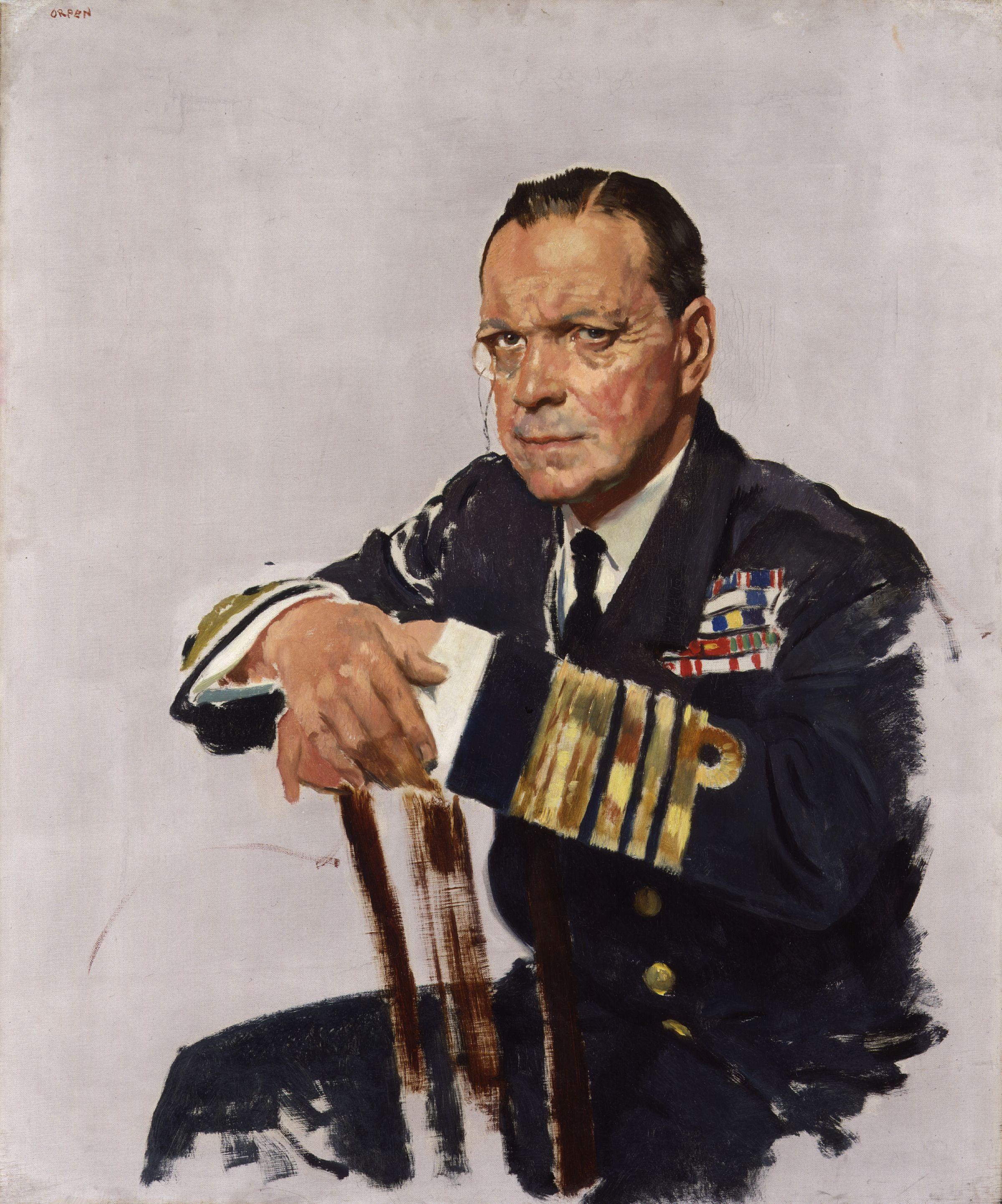
- Portrait of Wemyss by Sir William Orpen
- Born: 12 April 1864; London, England
- Died: 24 May 1933 (aged 69); Cannes, France
- Military career
- Allegiance: United Kingdom
- Branch: Royal Navy
- Service years: 1877–1919
- Rank: Admiral of the Fleet
- Commands: First Sea Lord; East Indies & Egyptian Squadron; 12th Cruiser Squadron; 2nd Battle Squadron; HMS Implacable; HMS Suffolk
- Conflicts: Second Boer War; First World War
- Awards: Knight Grand Cross of the Order of the Bath; Companion of the Order of St Michael and St George; Member of the Royal Victorian Order; Grand Cross of the Legion of Honour (France); Croix de guerre (France); Grand Cross of the Order of the Crown (Romania); Navy Distinguished Service Medal (United States)

Admiral of the Fleet Rosslyn Erskine Wemyss, 1st Baron Wester Wemyss, GCB, CMG, MVO (12 April 1864 – 24 May 1933), known as Sir Rosslyn Wemyss between 1916 and 1919, was a Royal Navy officer. During the First World War, he served as commander of the 12th Cruiser Squadron and then as Governor of Moudros before leading the British landings at Cape Helles and at Suvla Bay during the Gallipoli campaign. He went on to be Commander of the East Indies & Egyptian Squadron in January 1916 and then First Sea Lord in December 1917, in which role he encouraged Admiral Roger Keyes, Commander of the Dover Patrol, to undertake more vigorous operations in the Channel, ultimately leading to the launch of the Zeebrugge Raid in April 1918.

== Early life and naval career ==
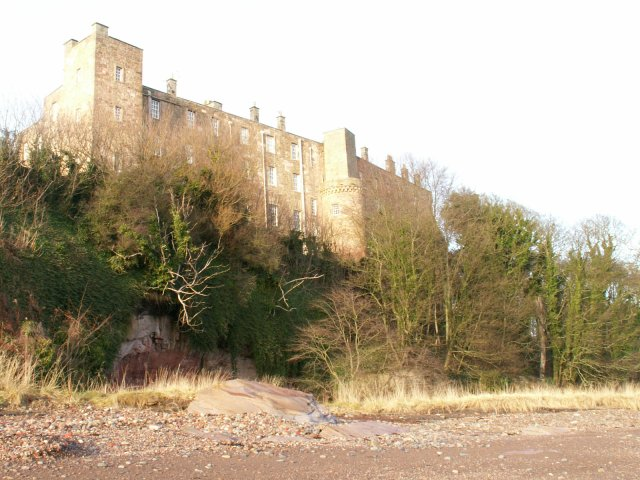
Wemyss Castle

Born the youngest son of James Hay Erskine Wemyss and Millicent Ann Mary Kennedy Wemyss (née Erskine), Wemyss (pronounced "Weems") he was raised at the ancestral home of Wemyss Castle on the Fife coast.

He joined the Royal Navy as a cadet in the training ship HMS Britannia in 1877. He was posted to the corvette HMS Bacchante in July 1879, having been promoted to midshipman on 23 September 1879, he transferred to the battleship HMS Northumberland in the Channel Squadron in 1883. After a tour in the corvette HMS Canada on the North America and West Indies Station, he was promoted to sub-lieutenant on 24 September 1883, and posted to the torpedo depot ship HMS Hecla in the Mediterranean Fleet in 1885. Promoted to lieutenant on 31 March 1887, he joined the Royal Yacht HMY Osborne in October 1887 and then transferred to the battleship HMS Anson in the Channel Squadron in September 1889. He joined the armoured cruiser HMS Undaunted in the Mediterranean Fleet in 1890, the battleship HMS Empress of India in the Channel Squadron in 1892 and the cruiser HMS Astraea in the Mediterranean Fleet in 1895.

Wemyss joined the Royal Yacht HMY Victoria and Albert in 1896. Promoted to commander on 31 August 1898, he transferred to the cruiser HMS Niobe on the Cape of Good Hope Station, which served as a troopship for prisoners of war during the Second Boer War. He was posted to the President for special service on 1 January 1901, but was shortly thereafter invited by the Duke of York to become second-in-command of the ocean liner SS Ophir during the royal cruise March–October 1901 to open the Parliament of Australia and visit Commonwealth countries to thank them for their support during the Boer War. Promoted to captain after their return, on 5 November 1901, he became an extra equerry to the Duke (now Prince of Wales) on 19 November 1901 and was appointed a Member (fourth class) of the Royal Victorian Order (MVO) on 24 December 1901. He was briefly posted to the President for temporary service at the Admiralty in October 1902, but the following month was on 25 November 1902 appointed in command of the old battleship HMS Superb, in Fleet Reserve at Portsmouth. He became Captain of the Royal Naval College, Osborne in August 1903.

Given command of the cruiser HMS Suffolk in the Mediterranean Fleet in 1905, he then took command of the battleship HMS Implacable in the Atlantic Fleet in March 1909. He served as Captain of the ocean liner SS Balmoral Castle for the Duke of Connaught's cruise to open the Parliament of South Africa in 1910. Appointed a Naval Aide-de-Camp to the King on 14 March 1910, he took part in the funeral of King Edward VII in May 1910 and became an extra equerry to King George V on 10 June 1910, he was appointed a Companion of the Order of St Michael and St George on 17 January 1911. Promoted to rear admiral on 19 April 1911, he became Commander of the 2nd Battle Squadron of the Home Fleet in October 1912.

== First World War and after ==
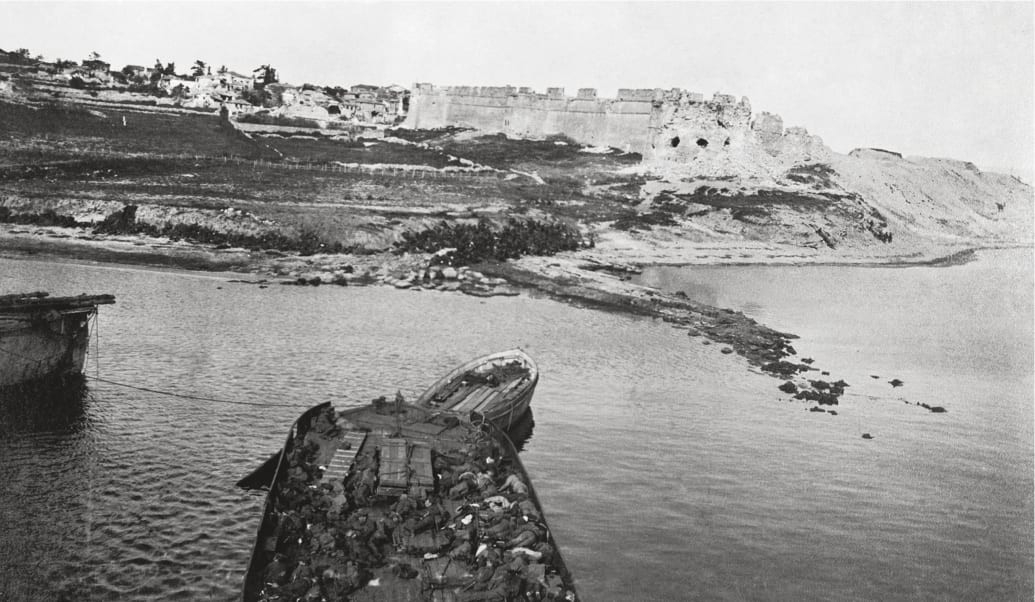
The British landings at Cape Helles at which Wemyss commanded a squadron

Wemyss served in the First World War, initially as commander of the 12th Cruiser Squadron in the Channel Fleet and then, after being despatched to Lemnos with a brief to prepare the harbour of Moudros for operations against the Dardanelles in February 1915, as Governor of Moudros. He commanded a squadron for the British landings at Cape Helles on 25 April 1915 and also gave support for the British landings at Suvla Bay on the Gallipoli Front on 9 August 1915. When the Gallipoli Campaign was abandoned he was responsible for the successful re-embarkation of troops from Suvla Bay and from Ari Burnu on 20 December 1915. He was appointed a Knight Commander of the Order of the Bath in the 1916 New Year Honours.

Wemyss became Commander of the East Indies & Egyptian Squadron in January 1916 where he supported military operations on the Palestine Front. He encouraged the Arab Revolt under Emir Faisal and T. E. Lawrence: the latter said that "Wemyss acted godfather til the Arabs were on their feet". Promoted to vice-admiral on 6 December 1916, he was appointed a Commander of the French Legion of Honour on 23 March 1917 and a Grand Officer of the Order of the Crown of Italy on 11 August 1917.

Returning to the Admiralty, Wemyss was appointed Second Sea Lord in September 1917 and then Deputy First Sea Lord in October 1917. Following Sir Eric Geddes's decision to dismiss the First Sea Lord, Admiral Sir John Jellicoe, Wemyss was appointed Jellicoe's replacement in December 1917. As First Sea Lord he encouraged Admiral Roger Keyes, Commander of the Dover Patrol, to undertake more vigorous operations in the Channel, ultimately leading to the launch of the Zeebrugge Raid in April 1918. He was advanced to Knight Grand Cross of the Order of the Bath in the 1918 Birthday Honours and represented Britain at the Armistice in November 1918. He was awarded the Grand Cross of the French Legion of Honour on 17 January 1919 and the French Croix de Guerre on 15 February 1919. He was also promoted to full admiral on 21 February 1919, awarded the Grand Cross of the Romanian Order of the Crown on 17 March 1919 and presented with the American Distinguished Service Medal on 16 September 1919.

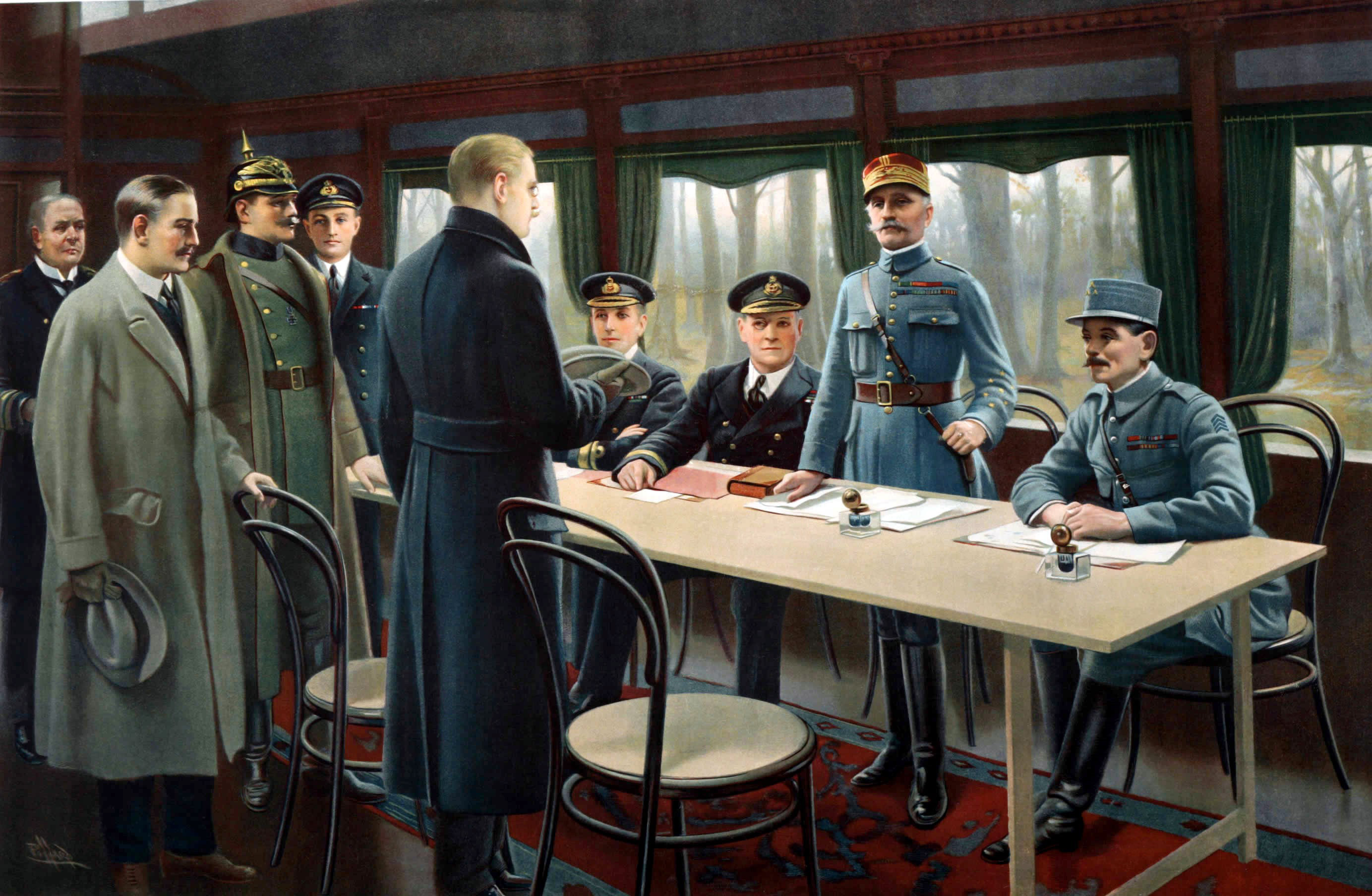
Wemyss (third from right) negotiating the ceasefire at the end of the First World War. Foch (Supreme Allied Commander) standing, his chief of staff Weygand sitting on the right.

Wemyss was the senior British representative at the signing of the armistice that ended active hostilities in the war. It was Wemyss who made the decision, much to the anger of British Prime Minister David Lloyd George, to have the ceasefire to come into effect at 11.00 a.m. Lloyd George wanted it to take place at 2.30 p.m. so that he could make the announcement in the House of Commons. Wemyss realised that 11 a.m on the 11th day of the 11th month had a strong, poetic quality about it; besides, by 2.30 p.m. more soldiers could be unnecessarily killed. After attending the Paris Peace Conference as Britain's naval representative and arranging for the end of the food blockade and hence unblocking the negotiations, Wemyss resigned in November 1919 following persistent calls for Sir David Beatty to be given his job.

Wemyss was promoted to Admiral of the Fleet on 1 November 1919. In retirement he wrote his memoirs under the title The Navy in the Dardanelles Campaign and became a Non-Executive Director of Cable & Wireless. He lived in Cannes where he died in his garden on 24 May 1933. He was buried at Wemyss Castle, his ancestral home.

== Family ==
On 21 December 1903 Wemyss married Victoria Morier, daughter of Sir Robert Morier; they had one daughter, Alice Elizabeth Millicent Erskine-Wemyss born on 17 September 1906. Alice was interned at a Frontstalag in Vittel, France, during the Second World War.

== Sources ==
- Heathcote, Tony (2002). The British Admirals of the Fleet 1734 – 1995. Pen & Sword Ltd. ISBN 0-85052-835-6.
- Keynes, John Maynard (1949). Two Memoirs: Dr Melchior - a Defeated Enemy and My Early Beliefs. London: Rupert Hart-Davis.
- Lawrence, T.E. (1997). Seven Pillars of Wisdom. Wordsworth Editions Ltd. ISBN 978-1853264696.

Military offices
Preceded by Sir Richard Peirse	Commander-in-Chief, East Indies and Egypt Station; 1916–1917	Succeeded by Sir Ernest Gaunt
Preceded by Sir Cecil Burney	Second Sea Lord; 1917	Succeeded by Sir Herbert Heath
Preceded by Sir John Jellicoe	First Sea Lord; 1917–1919	Succeeded by The Earl Beatty
Peerage of the United Kingdom
New creation	Baron Wester Wemyss; 1919–1933	Extinct
