= James Erskine Wemyss =

Scottish MP and Rear-Admiral

Rear-Admiral James Erskine Wemyss

Member of Parliament for Fife
- In office 1832–1847
- Preceded by: James Lindsay
- Succeeded by: John Fergus

Personal details
- Born: 9 July 1789
- Died: 3 April 1854 (aged 64)
- Spouse: Lady Emma Hay (m. 1826; died 1841)
- Relations: James Wemyss (grandfather); Sir William Erskine, 1st Baronet (grandfather); Elizabeth Gordon, Duchess of Gordon (cousin)
- Children: Frances Harriet Wemyss; James Hay Erskine Wemyss
- Parent(s): William Wemyss; Frances Erskine

Rear-Admiral James Erskine Wemyss (9 July 1789 – 3 April 1854) was a Scottish MP and Rear-Admiral.

== Early life ==
Wemyss was born on 9 July 1789. He was the son of Gen. William Wemyss (1760—1822) and Frances Erskine. His siblings included Frances Wemyss (wife of James St Clair-Erskine, 3rd Earl of Rosslyn), Lt.-Gen. William Wemyss, and Clementina Wemyss (who married Chief Justice James Dewar of The Supreme Court, Bombay).

His paternal grandparents were Hon. James Wemyss (third son of the 5th Earl of Wemyss) and Lady Elizabeth Sutherland (the only daughter of the 17th Earl of Sutherland). Through his aunt Elizabeth Margaret (wife of Alexander Brodie, MP), he was a first cousin of Elizabeth Gordon, Duchess of Gordon. His maternal grandparents were Sir William Erskine, 1st Baronet and Frances Moray (a daughter of James Moray, 13th of Abercairny and Lady Christian Montgomerie).

== Career ==
In 1820 he succeeded his father as Member of Parliament for Fife, sitting until 1831. He represented the county again from 1832 to 1847. He served as a Rear-Admiral in the Royal Navy.

From 17 December 1840 until his death on 3 April 1854, he served as Lord Lieutenant of Fife.

== Personal life ==
On 8 August 1826, Wemyss was married to Lady Emma Hay, a daughter of William Hay, 17th Earl of Erroll and, his second wife, Alicia Eliot (the third daughter of Samuel Eliot, Esq. of Antigua). Her sister, Lady Isabella Hay, married James' brother, Lt.-Gen. William Wemyss. Together, they lived at Wemyss Castle, East Wemyss, Scotland, and were the parents of:

- Frances Harriet Wemyss (1827–1877), who married Capt. Charles James Balfour, son of Lt.-Gen. Robert Balfour, 6th of Balbirnie and Eglantyne Katherine Fordyce, in 1850.
- James Hay Erskine Wemyss (1829–1864), who also served as MP for Fife; he married Millicent Anne Mary Kennedy-Erskine, daughter of the Hon. John Kennedy-Erskine of Dun (son of the 1st Marquess of Ailsa) and Lady Augusta FitzClarence (an illegitimate daughter of King William IV of the United Kingdom by his mistress Dora Bland) in 1855.

Lady Emma died on 17 July 1841. Wemyss died on 3 April 1854.

Parliament of the United Kingdom
Preceded by James Lindsay	Member of Parliament for Fife; 1832–1847	Succeeded by John Fergus
