= 1875 Kirkcaldy Burghs by-election =

UK Parliamentary by-election

The 1875 Kirkcaldy Burghs by-election was fought on 20 April 1875. The by-election was fought due to the death of the incumbent Liberal MP, Robert Reid. It was won by the Liberal candidate George Campbell.
