= 1944 Kirkcaldy Burghs by-election =

UK Parliamentary by-election

The 1944 Kirkcaldy Burghs by-election was held on 17 February 1944. The by-election was held due to the resignation of the incumbent Labour MP, Tom Kennedy. It was won by the Labour candidate Thomas Hubbard, but Douglas Young of the Scottish National Party came a close second.

Kirkcaldy Burghs by-election, 1944
Party	Candidate	Votes	%	±%
Labour	Thomas Hubbard	8,268	51.6	−4.7
SNP	Douglas Young	6,621	41.3	New
Christian Socialist	Henry Hilditch	1,136	7.1	New
Majority		1,647	10.3	−2.3
Turnout		16,025		
Labour hold		Swing		
