= Kirkcaldy Burghs =

Parliamentary constituency in the United Kingdom, 1832–1974

- Former burgh constituency for the House of Commons

1950–1974
- Seats: One
- Replaced by: Kirkcaldy

1832–1950
- Seats: One
- Type of constituency: District of burghs constituency
- Created from: Dysart Burghs

Kirkcaldy Burghs was a burgh constituency of the House of Commons of the Parliament of the United Kingdom (Westminster) from 1832 to 1974. It elected one Member of Parliament (MP) by the first-past-the-post voting system. From 1832 to 1950 it was, officially, a district of burghs constituency.

== Boundaries ==
=== 1885–1918 ===
Comprising Kirkcaldy, Burntisland, Dysart, Kinghorn and the Municipal Burgh of Kirkcaldy not included in the old Parliamentary Burgh (except that portion within the Parliamentary Borough of Dysart).

=== 1918–1949 ===
The burghs of Kirkcaldy, Buckhaven, Methil and Innerleven, Burntisland, Dysart and Kinghorn.

== Members of Parliament ==
Election	Member	Party	Notes
1832	Robert Ferguson	Whig	
1835	John Fergus	Whig	
1837	Robert Ferguson	Whig	
1841 by-election	Robert Ferguson	Whig	
1859	Robert Ferguson	Liberal	
1862 by-election	Roger Sinclair Aytoun	Liberal	
1874	Robert Reid	Liberal	
1875 by-election	George Campbell	Liberal	
1885	George Campbell	Independent Liberal	
1886	George Campbell	Liberal	
1892 by-election	Henry Dalziel	Liberal	
1916	Henry Dalziel	Coalition Liberal	later Baron Dalziel of Kirkcaldy
1921 by-election	Tom Kennedy	Labour	
1922	Sir Robert Hutchison	National Liberal	
Nov 1923	Sir Robert Hutchison	Liberal	later Baron Hutchison of Montrose
Dec 1923	Tom Kennedy	Labour	
1931	Albert Russell	Unionist	
1935	Tom Kennedy	Labour	
1944 by-election	Thomas Hubbard	Labour	
1959	Harry Gourlay	Labour	Contested Kirkcaldy following redistribution
Feb. 1974	Constituency abolished: see Kirkcaldy		

== Election results 1832–1885 ==
Decades:	1840s; 1850s; 1860s; 1870s; 1880s; 1890s; 1900s; 1910s

=== Elections in the 1830s ===
General election 1832: Kirkcaldy Burghs
Party	Candidate	Votes	%
Whig	Robert Ferguson	Unopposed	
Registered electors		507	
Whig win (new seat)			

General election 1835: Kirkcaldy Burghs
Party	Candidate	Votes	%
Whig	John Fergus	Unopposed	
Registered electors		539	
Whig hold			

General election 1837: Kirkcaldy Burghs
Party	Candidate	Votes	%
Whig	Robert Ferguson	Unopposed	
Registered electors		641	
Whig hold			

=== Elections in the 1840s ===
Ferguson's death caused a by-election.

By-election, 27 January 1841: Kirkcaldy Burghs
Party	Candidate	Votes	%	±%
Whig	Robert Ferguson	218	62.5	N/A
Radical	John Bowring	131	37.5	N/A
Majority		87	25.0	N/A
Turnout		349	53.1	N/A
Registered electors		657		
Whig hold		Swing	N/A	

General election 1841: Kirkcaldy Burghs
Party	Candidate	Votes	%	±%
Whig	Robert Ferguson	Unopposed		
Registered electors		657		
Whig hold				

General election 1847: Kirkcaldy Burghs
Party	Candidate	Votes	%	±%
Whig	Robert Ferguson	Unopposed		
Registered electors		896		
Whig hold				

=== Elections in the 1850s ===
General election 1852: Kirkcaldy Burghs
Party	Candidate	Votes	%	±%
Whig	Robert Ferguson	Unopposed		
Registered electors		786		
Whig hold				

General election 1857: Kirkcaldy Burghs
Party	Candidate	Votes	%	±%
Whig	Robert Ferguson	Unopposed		
Registered electors		728		
Whig hold				

General election 1859: Kirkcaldy Burghs
Party	Candidate	Votes	%	±%
Liberal	Robert Ferguson	312	51.5	N/A
Conservative	William Harcourt	294	48.5	New
Majority		18	3.0	N/A
Turnout		606	78.0	N/A
Registered electors		777		
Liberal hold				

=== Elections in the 1860s ===
Ferguson resigned, causing a by-election.

By-election, 25 July 1862: Kirkcaldy Burghs
Party	Candidate	Votes	%	±%
Liberal	Roger Sinclair Aytoun	Unopposed		
Liberal hold				

General election 1865: Kirkcaldy Burghs
Party	Candidate	Votes	%	±%
Liberal	Roger Sinclair Aytoun	Unopposed		
Registered electors		816		
Liberal hold				

General election 1868: Kirkcaldy Burghs
Party	Candidate	Votes	%	±%
Liberal	Roger Sinclair Aytoun	Unopposed		
Registered electors		3,160		
Liberal hold				

=== Elections in the 1870s ===
General election 1874: Kirkcaldy Burghs
Party	Candidate	Votes	%	±%
Liberal	Robert Reid	1,967	61.6	N/A
Conservative	James Townsend Oswald	1,228	38.4	New
Majority		739	23.2	N/A
Turnout		3,195	84.8	N/A
Registered electors		3,766		
Liberal hold		Swing	N/A	

Reid's death caused a by-election.

By-election, 23 Apr 1875: Kirkcaldy Burghs
Party	Candidate	Votes	%	±%
Liberal	George Campbell	1,811	60.7	−0.9
Independent Liberal	William Jarvis Harker	1,171	39.3	New
Majority		640	21.4	−1.8
Turnout		2,982	78.2	−6.6
Registered electors		3,811		
Liberal hold		Swing	N/A	

=== Elections in the 1880s ===
General election 1880: Kirkcaldy Burghs
Party	Candidate	Votes	%	±%
Liberal	George Campbell	2,763	97.9	+36.3
Conservative	Charles Scott	59	2.1	−36.3
Majority		2,704	95.8	+72.6
Turnout		2,822	63.2	−21.6
Registered electors		4,465		
Liberal hold		Swing	+36.3	

== Election results 1885–1918 ==
=== Elections in the 1880s ===
General election 1885: Kirkcaldy Burghs
Party	Candidate	Votes	%	±%
Independent Liberal	George Campbell	2,180	49.2	−48.7
Lib-Lab	John Malcolm Inglis	1,504	34.0	−63.9
Conservative	Hugh Munro	746	16.8	+14.7
Majority		676	15.2	−80.6
Turnout		4,430	83.9	+20.7
Registered electors		5,282		
Independent Liberal gain from Liberal		Swing		

General election 1886: Kirkcaldy Burghs
Party	Candidate	Votes	%	±%
Liberal	George Campbell	2,014	68.9	+19.7
Liberal Unionist	Thomas Barclay	911	31.1	+14.3
Majority		1,103	37.8	+22.6
Turnout		2,925	55.4	−28.5
Registered electors		5,282		
Liberal gain from Independent Liberal		Swing	+2.7	

=== Elections in the 1890s ===
Dalziel

1892 Kirkcaldy Burghs by-election
Party	Candidate	Votes	%	±%
Liberal	Henry Dalziel	2,567	62.6	−6.3
Liberal Unionist	Robert Cox	1,531	37.4	+6.3
Majority		1,036	25.2	−12.6
Turnout		4,098	77.7	+22.3
Registered electors		5,274		
Liberal hold		Swing	-6.3	

General election 1892: Kirkcaldy Burghs
Party	Candidate	Votes	%	±%
Liberal	Henry Dalziel	2,741	74.5	+5.6
Conservative	John Chisholm (politician)	939	25.5	−5.6
Majority		1,802	49.0	+11.2
Turnout		3,680	69.8	+14.4
Registered electors		5,274		
Liberal hold		Swing	+5.6	

General election 1895: Kirkcaldy Burghs
Party	Candidate	Votes	%	±%
Liberal	Henry Dalziel	3,078	73.3	−1.2
Conservative	Charles Granville Kekewich	1,122	26.7	+1.2
Majority		1,956	46.6	−2.4
Turnout		4,200	72.3	+2.5
Registered electors		5,808		
Liberal hold		Swing	-1.2	

=== Elections in the 1900s ===
General election 1900: Kirkcaldy Burghs
Party	Candidate	Votes	%	±%
Liberal	Henry Dalziel	3,354	62.5	−10.8
Liberal Unionist	Michael Nairn	2,013	37.5	+10.8
Majority		1,341	25.0	−21.6
Turnout		5,367	78.1	+5.8
Registered electors		6,872		
Liberal hold		Swing	−10.8	

General election 1906: Kirkcaldy Burghs
Party	Candidate	Votes	%	±%
Liberal	Henry Dalziel	4,659	76.8	+14.3
Conservative	Andrew Constable	1,410	23.2	−14.3
Majority		3,249	53.6	+28.6
Turnout		6,069	76.4	−1.7
Registered electors		7,943		
Liberal hold		Swing	+14.3	

=== Elections in the 1910s ===
General election January 1910: Kirkcaldy Burghs
Party	Candidate	Votes	%	±%
Liberal	Henry Dalziel	5,035	75.2	−1.6
Conservative	Arthur Anthony Baumann	1,659	24.8	+1.6
Majority		3,376	50.4	−3.2
Turnout		6,694		
Liberal hold		Swing	-3.6	

General election December 1910: Kirkcaldy Burghs
Party	Candidate	Votes	%	±%
Liberal	Henry Dalziel	Unopposed		
Liberal hold				

== Election results 1918–1949 ==
Decades:	1910s; 1920s; 1930s; 1940s

=== Elections in the 1910s ===
General election 1918: Kirkcaldy Burghs
Party		Candidate	Votes	%
C	National Liberal	Henry Dalziel	Unopposed	
Registered electors				
	National Liberal win (new boundaries)			
C indicates candidate endorsed by the coalition government.

=== Elections in the 1920s ===
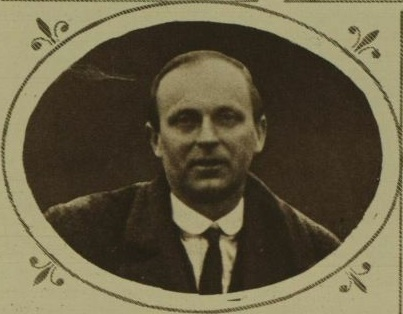
Kennedy

1921 Kirkcaldy Burghs by-election
Party		Candidate	Votes	%	±%
	Labour	Tom Kennedy	11,674	53.4	New
C	National Liberal	Robert Lockhart	10,199	46.6	N/A
Majority			1,475	6.8	N/A
Turnout			21,873	65.6	N/A
Registered electors					
	Labour gain from National Liberal		Swing	N/A	
C indicates candidate endorsed by the coalition government.

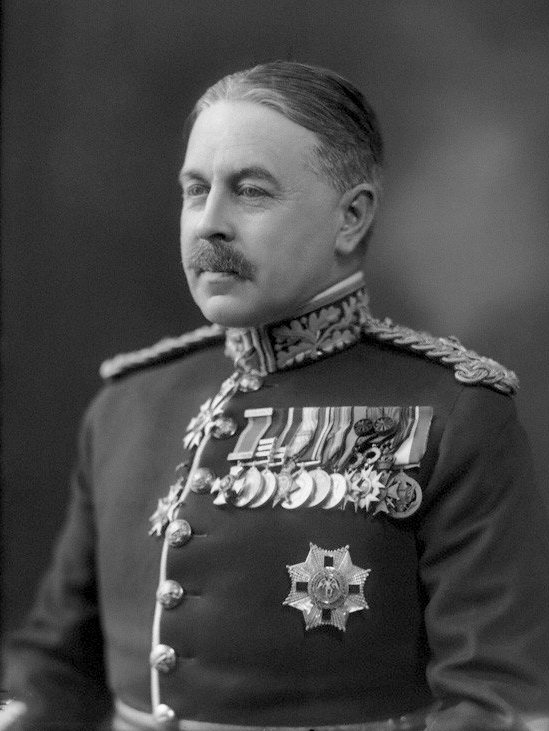
Hutchison

General election 1922: Kirkcaldy Burghs
Party	Candidate	Votes	%	±%
National Liberal	Robert Hutchison	12,762	51.4	+4.8
Labour	Tom Kennedy	12,089	48.6	−4.8
Majority		673	2.8	N/A
Turnout		24,851	79.3	+13.7
Registered electors				
National Liberal hold		Swing	+4.8	

General election 1923: Kirkcaldy Burghs
Party	Candidate	Votes	%	±%
Labour	Tom Kennedy	14,221	54.4	+5.8
Liberal	Robert Hutchison	11,937	45.6	−5.8
Majority		2,284	8.8	N/A
Turnout		26,158	81.7	+2.4
Labour gain from Liberal		Swing	+5.8	

General election 1924: Kirkcaldy Burghs
Party	Candidate	Votes	%	±%
Labour	Tom Kennedy	14,038	52.7	−1.7
Liberal	John Murray	12,607	47.3	+1.7
Majority		1,431	5.4	−3.4
Turnout		26,645	81.8	+0.1
Labour hold		Swing	-1.7	

General election 1929: Kirkcaldy Burghs
Party	Candidate	Votes	%	±%
Labour	Tom Kennedy	17,410	59.6	+6.9
Unionist	Henry Scrymgeour-Wedderburn	11,805	40.4	New
Majority		5,605	19.2	+13.8
Turnout		29,215	72.2	−9.6
Labour hold		Swing		

=== Elections in the 1930s ===
General election 1931: Kirkcaldy Burghs
Party	Candidate	Votes	%	±%
Unionist	Albert Russell	19,132	56.9	+16.5
Labour	Tom Kennedy	14,492	43.1	−16.5
Majority		4,640	13.8	N/A
Turnout		33,624	81.1	+8.9
Unionist gain from Labour		Swing	+16.5	

General election 1935: Kirkcaldy Burghs
Party	Candidate	Votes	%	±%
Labour	Tom Kennedy	19,457	56.3	+13.2
Unionist	Albert Russell	15,086	43.7	−13.2
Majority		4,371	12.6	N/A
Turnout		34,543	79.9	−1.2
Labour gain from Unionist		Swing	+13.2	

=== Elections in the 1940s ===
1944 Kirkcaldy Burghs by-election
Party	Candidate	Votes	%	±%
Labour	Thomas Hubbard	8,268	51.6	−4.7
SNP	Douglas Young	6,621	41.3	New
Christian Socialist	Henry Hilditch	1,136	7.1	New
Majority		1,647	10.3	−2.3
Turnout		16,025		
Labour hold		Swing		

General election 1945: Kirkcaldy Burghs
Party	Candidate	Votes	%	±%
Labour	Thomas Hubbard	15,401	45.0	−11.3
Unionist	Christopher Guest	10,099	29.5	−14.2
SNP	Douglas Young	5,811	17.0	N/A
Communist	John McArthur	2,898	8.5	New
Majority		5,302	15.5	+2.9
Turnout		34,209	76.4	−3.5
Labour hold		Swing	+1.4	

== Election results 1950–1973 ==
Decades:	1950s; 1960s; 1970s

=== Elections in the 1950s ===
General election 1950: Kirkcaldy Burghs
Party	Candidate	Votes	%
Labour	Thomas Hubbard	25,756	59.97
Unionist	R Bell	17,192	40.03
Majority		8,564	19.94
Turnout		42,948	84.80
Registered electors			
Labour win (new boundaries)			

General election 1951: Kirkcaldy Burghs
Party	Candidate	Votes	%	±%
Labour	Thomas Hubbard	26,885	60.59	+0.62
National Liberal (Unionist)	Ralph Harris	17,484	39.41	−0.62
Majority		9,401	21.18	+1.24
Turnout		44,369	84.63	−0.17
Registered electors				
Labour hold		Swing	+0.62	

General election 1955: Kirkcaldy Burghs
Party	Candidate	Votes	%
Labour	Thomas Hubbard	23,861	59.28
National Liberal (Unionist)	Duncan Drummond Young	16,392	40.72
Majority		7,469	18.56
Turnout		40,253	75.31
Registered electors			
Labour win (new boundaries)			

General election 1959: Kirkcaldy Burghs
Party	Candidate	Votes	%	±%
Labour	Harry Gourlay	25,428	58.28	−1.00
Unionist	James Law	14,186	32.51	−8.21
Liberal	David Blyth	4,020	9.21	New
Majority		11,242	25.77	+7.21
Turnout		43,634	80.46	+5.15
Labour hold		Swing	+3.61	

=== Elections in the 1960s ===
General election 1964: Kirkcaldy Burghs
Party	Candidate	Votes	%	±%
Labour	Harry Gourlay	24,263	59.99	+1.71
National Liberal (Unionist)	Neil Gow	11,756	29.07	−3.44
SNP	James C. Lees	4,423	10.94	New
Majority		12,507	30.92	+5.15
Turnout		40,442	77.25	−3.21
Labour hold		Swing		

General election 1966: Kirkcaldy Burghs
Party	Candidate	Votes	%	±%
Labour	Harry Gourlay	23,273	59.62	−0.37
Conservative	Neil Gow	10,539	27.00	−2.07
SNP	James C. Lees	4,423	13.38	+2.44
Majority		12,734	32.62	+1.60
Turnout		39,035	75.41	−1.84
Registered electors		52,355		
Labour hold		Swing	+0.85	

=== Elections in the 1970s ===
General election 1970: Kirkcaldy Burghs
Party	Candidate	Votes	%	±%
Labour	Harry Gourlay	22,986	56.01	−3.61
Conservative	A Myles Hogg	13,193	32.15	+5.15
SNP	James C. Lees	4,863	11.85	−1.53
Majority		9,793	23.86	−8.76
Turnout		41,042	71.87	−3.54
Registered electors		52,355		
Labour hold		Swing	-4.38	
