= Fife (UK Parliament constituency) =

Parliamentary constituency in the United Kingdom, 1801–1885

- Former county constituency for the House of Commons
- Major settlements: Fife

1708–1885
- Seats: One
- Created from: Fife
- Replaced by: East Fife; West Fife

Fife was a county constituency represented in the House of Commons of Great Britain from 1708 to 1801 and the House of Commons of the Parliament of the United Kingdom from 1801 until 1885, when it was divided into East Fife and West Fife.

== Creation ==
The British parliamentary constituency was created in 1708 following the Acts of Union, 1707 and replaced the former Parliament of Scotland shire constituency of Fifeshire.

== History ==
The constituency elected one Member of Parliament (MP) by the first past the post system until the seat was divided in 1885.

== Boundaries ==
The constituency covered the county of Fife.

== Members of Parliament ==
Election	Member	Party	Notes
1708	Patrick Moncreiff		
1709	Sir Robert Anstruther		
1710	Sir Alexander Erskine		
1715	Sir John Anstruther, 1st Baronet		
1741	David Scott		
1747	James Oswald		
1754	James St Clair		
1763	James Wemyss		
1768	John Scott		
1776	James Townsend Oswald		
1779	Robert Skene		
1780	John Henderson		5th Baronet from 1781
1780	Robert Skene		
1787	William Wemyss		
1796	Sir William Erskine, Bt		British Army officer, died insane
1806	Robert Ferguson		
1807	William Wemyss		
1820	James Erskine Wemyss	Whig	
1831	James Lindsay	Tory	
1832	James Erskine Wemyss	Whig	
1847	John Fergus	Whig	
1859	James Hay Erskine Wemyss	Liberal	
1864	Sir Robert Anstruther, 5th Baronet	Liberal	
1880	Robert Preston Bruce	Liberal	

== Election results ==
=== Elections in the 1830s ===
General election 1830: Fife
Party	Candidate	Votes	%
Whig	James Erskine Wemyss	Unopposed	
Registered electors		239	
Whig hold			

General election 1831: Fife
Party	Candidate	Votes	%
Tory	James Lindsay (1793-1855)	85	55.6
Whig	James Erskine Wemyss	68	44.4
Majority		17	11.2
Turnout		153	64.0
Registered electors		239	
Tory gain from Whig			

General election 1832: Fife
Party	Candidate	Votes	%
Whig	James Erskine Wemyss	Unopposed	
Registered electors		2,185	
Whig gain from Tory			

General election 1835: Fife
Party	Candidate	Votes	%
Whig	James Erskine Wemyss	1,051	64.3
Conservative	James Lindsay (1793-1855)	584	35.7
Majority		467	28.6
Turnout		1,635	70.8
Registered electors		2,309	
Whig hold			

General election 1837: Fife
Party	Candidate	Votes	%	±%
Whig	James Erskine Wemyss	1,086	65.7	+1.4
Conservative	James Bruce	567	34.3	−1.4
Majority		519	31.4	+2.8
Turnout		1,653	60.8	−10.0
Registered electors		2,720		
Whig hold		Swing	+1.4	

=== Elections in the 1840s ===
General election 1841: Fife
Party	Candidate	Votes	%	±%
Whig	James Erskine Wemyss	Unopposed		
Registered electors		2,967		
Whig hold				

General election 1847: Fife
Party	Candidate	Votes	%	±%
Whig	John Fergus	834	52.1	N/A
Conservative	John Balfour	768	47.9	New
Majority		66	4.2	N/A
Turnout		1,602	65.6	N/A
Registered electors		2,444		
Whig hold				

=== Elections in the 1850s ===
General election 1852: Fife
Party	Candidate	Votes	%	±%
Whig	John Fergus	Unopposed		
Registered electors		3,211		
Whig hold				

General election 1857: Fife
Party	Candidate	Votes	%	±%
Whig	John Fergus	Unopposed		
Registered electors		3,389		
Whig hold				

General election 1859: Fife
Party	Candidate	Votes	%	±%
Liberal	James Hay Erskine Wemyss	1,087	56.1	N/A
Conservative	Robert St Clair-Erskine	850	43.9	New
Majority		237	12.2	N/A
Turnout		1,937	47.8	N/A
Registered electors		4,056		
Liberal hold		Swing	N/A	

=== Elections in the 1860s ===
Wemyss's death caused a by-election.

By-election, 19 April 1864: Fife
Party	Candidate	Votes	%	±%
Liberal	Robert Anstruther	Unopposed		
Liberal hold				

General election 1865: Fife
Party	Candidate	Votes	%	±%
Liberal	Robert Anstruther	Unopposed		
Registered electors		2,725		
Liberal hold				

General election 1868: Fife
Party	Candidate	Votes	%	±%
Liberal	Robert Anstruther	1,837	62.0	N/A
Liberal	John Boyd Kinnear	1,127	38.0	N/A
Majority		710	24.0	N/A
Turnout		2,964	70.5	N/A
Registered electors		4,206		
Liberal hold		Swing	N/A	

=== Elections in the 1870s ===
General election 1874: Fife
Party	Candidate	Votes	%	±%
Liberal	Robert Anstruther	1,859	60.2	−1.8
Conservative	Frederick William Hamilton	1,230	39.8	New
Majority		629	20.4	−3.6
Turnout		3,089	70.9	+0.4
Registered electors		4,358		
Liberal hold		Swing	N/A	

=== Elections in the 1880s ===
General election 1880: Fife
Party	Candidate	Votes	%	±%
Liberal	Robert Preston Bruce	2,421	63.8	+3.6
Conservative	James Townsend Oswald	1,373	36.2	−3.6
Majority		1,048	27.6	+7.2
Turnout		3,794	79.6	+8.7
Registered electors		4,767		
Liberal hold		Swing	+3.6	
