= William Wemyss =

Scottish soldier in the British Army and Member of Parliament

General William Wemyss
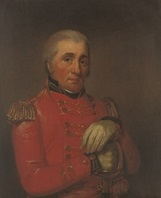

Member of Parliament for Fife
- In office 1807–1820
- Preceded by: Robert Ferguson
- Succeeded by: James Erskine Wemyss
- In office 1787–1796
- Preceded by: Robert Skene
- Succeeded by: Sir William Erskine, Bt

Member of Parliament for Sutherland
- In office 1784–1787
- Preceded by: James Wemyss
- Succeeded by: James Grant

Personal details
- Born: 9 April 1760
- Died: 4 February 1822 (aged 61)
- Spouse: Frances Erskine (after 1788)
- Relations: James Wemyss, 5th Earl of Wemyss (grandfather)
- Parent(s): James Wemyss; Lady Elizabeth Sutherland

Military service
- Allegiance: United Kingdom
- Branch/service: (United Kingdom) British Army
- Rank: General
- Battles/wars: Napoleonic Wars

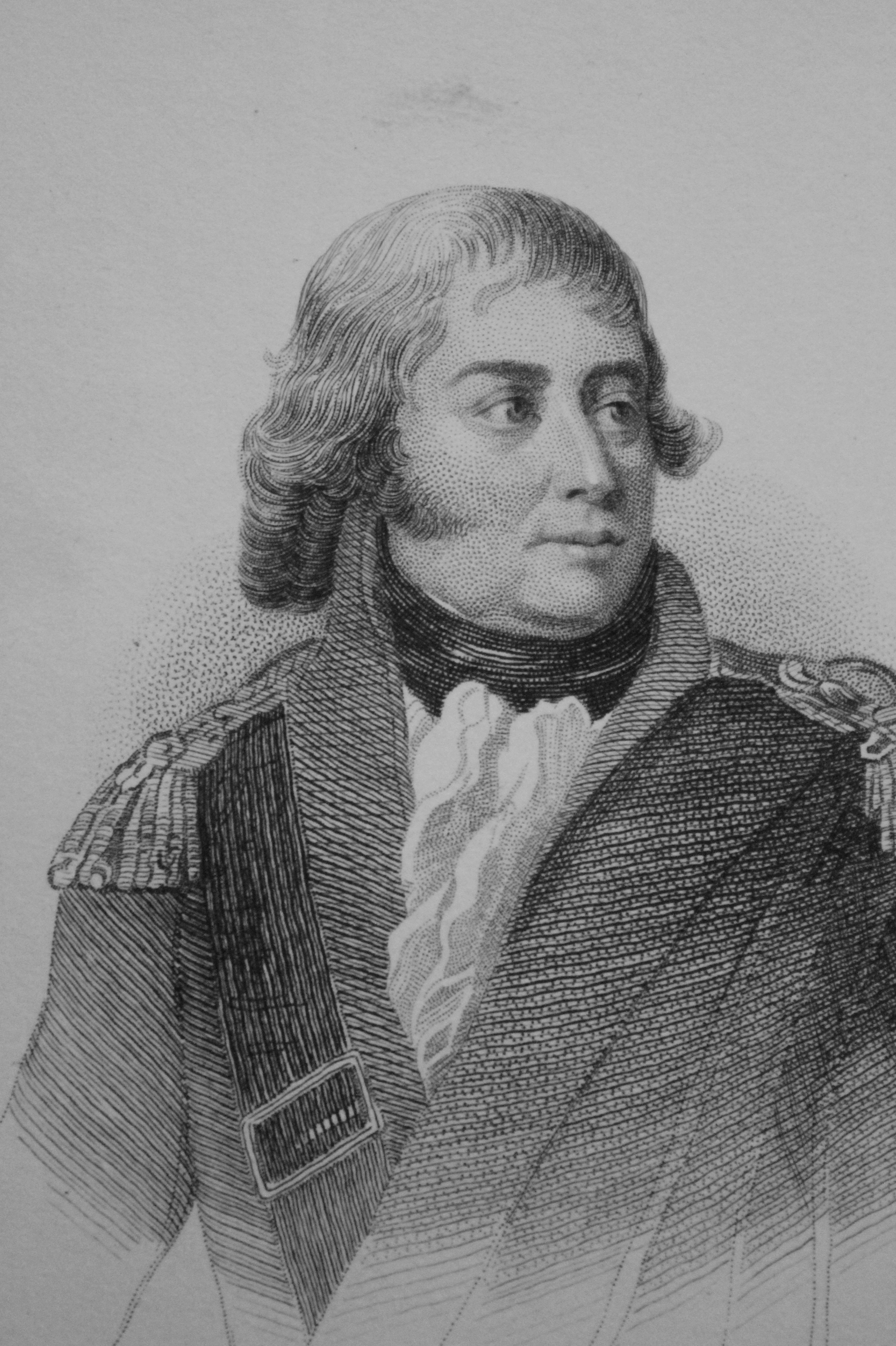
Major General William Wemyss c.1800

General William Wemyss of Wemyss (9 April 1760 – 4 February 1822) was a Scottish soldier in the British Army and Member of Parliament.

== Early life ==
He was the son of the Hon. James Wemyss, third son of the 5th Earl of Wemyss, and his wife Lady Elizabeth Sutherland, only daughter of William Sutherland, 17th Earl of Sutherland.

== Career ==
From 1784 to 1787 Wemyss was MP for Sutherland, succeeding his father, before sitting for Fife from 1787 to 1796 and again from 1807 to 1820.

=== Military career ===
Captain in the Army by brevet, 1 July 1783 DAG in Scotland and Major, 18 November 1786 DAG in Scotland and Lieutenant-Colonel, 1 October 1791 Colonel, 22 August 1795

He attained the rank of Major-General on 23 June 1798. Action near Ardee

Major-General William Wemyss raised the 93rd Sutherland Highlanders in 1799 for his cousin the 16-year-old Countess of Sutherland, Elizabeth Sutherland Leveson-Gower. Men were recruited to the Regiment through a highly original form of conscription. General Wemyss lined up the young men of each parish and invited them to drink from a large silver bound horn, having drunk his dram it was understood he consented to join the Regiment.

On 16 September 1800 he was Colonel of a new Regiment of Infantry, later the 93rd Regiment of Foot. On 30 October 1805 he was promoted to lieutenant-general. He was aide-de-camp to Major-General Sir William Erskine in the 1809 Walcheren Campaign and during the Peninsular War. In 1810 it was announced that he would succeed Sir Hew Dalrymple as Colonel of the 37th (North Hampshire) Regiment of Foot, with General Needham becoming Colonel of the 93rd, but the appointments did not take place and Wemyss remained Colonel of the 93rd Foot until his death, when he was succeeded by Sir Thomas Hislop.

He was promoted to full general on 4 June 1814.

== Personal life ==
On 16 September 1788 he married Frances, daughter of Sir William Erskine, 1st Baronet. Their children included

- Frances Wemyss (1794–1858), who married James St Clair-Erskine, 3rd Earl of Rosslyn.
- James Erskine Wemyss (1789–1854), a Rear-Admiral who married Lady Emma Hay, daughter of William Hay, 17th Earl of Erroll.
- William Wemyss (1790–1852), a Lieutenant-General and also colonel of the 93rd Foot who married Lady Isabella Hay, another daughter of the 17th Earl of Erroll.
- Clementina Wemyss (1805–1834), who married James Dewar, Chief Justice of The Supreme Court, Bombay.

Wemyss died on 4 February 1822.

Parliament of Great Britain
| Preceded by James Wemyss | Member of Parliament for Sutherland; 1784–1787 | Succeeded by James Grant |
| Preceded by Robert Skene | Member of Parliament for Fife; 1787–1796 | Succeeded by Sir William Erskine, Bt |
Parliament of the United Kingdom
| Preceded by Robert Ferguson | Member of Parliament for Fife; 1807–1820 | Succeeded by James Erskine Wemyss |
