= Douglas (surname) =

Douglas, occasionally spelt Douglass, is a Scottish surname. It is thought to derive from the Scottish Gaelic dubh glas, meaning "black stream". There are numerous places in Scotland from which the surname is derived. The surname has developed into the given name Douglas. Douglas is a habitational name, which could be derived from any of the many places so-named. While there are numerous places with this name in Scotland, it is thought, in most cases, to refer to Douglas, South Lanarkshire, the location of Douglas Castle, the chief stronghold of the Lords of Douglas. The Scottish Gaelic form of the given name is Dùbhghlas [ˈt̪uːl̪ˠəs̪]; the Irish-language forms are Dúghlas and Dubhghlas, which are pronounced [ˈd̪ˠuːɣlˠəsˠ]. According to George Fraser Black, in southern Argyllshire the surname is an Anglicised form of the surnames MacLucas, MacLugash (which are derived from the Gaelic Mac Lùcais).

== Arts ==
=== Visual arts ===
- Aaron Douglas (artist) (1900–1979), American artist
- Andrew Douglas (born 1952), British photographer/director
- Haldane Douglas (1892–1980), American art director
- Jessie O. Douglas (1856-19??), British artist
- John Douglas (English architect) (1830–1911), English architect
- John Douglas (Scottish architect) (died 1778)
- Malcolm Douglas (illustrator) (1954–2009), British illustrator
- Mel Douglas (born 1978), Australian glass artist
- Sholto Johnstone Douglas (1871–1958), Scottish artist known as Sholto Douglas or Robert Sholto Johnstone Douglas
- Stan Douglas (born 1960), Canadian artist
- Stuart Douglas (born 1962), British photographer/director

=== Literature ===
- Lord Alfred Douglas (1870–1945), British poet
- Alice May Douglas (1865–1943), American poet, author, editor
- Amanda Minnie Douglas (1831–1916), American writer of children's stories
- Carole Nelson Douglas (1944–2021), American writer
- Colin Douglas (novelist) (born 1945), pseudonym of Colin Thomas Currie, Scottish novelist
- David John Douglass, British political activist and writer
- Ellen Douglas (1921–2012), born Josephine Ayres Haxton, American author
- Gavin Douglas (1474–1522), Scottish poet and bishop
- Geoffrey Douglas (born 1944), American author and journalist
- Helen Douglas Irvine (1880–1947), Scottish novelist, historian and translator
- Jack Douglas (writer) (1908–1989), American comedy writer
- J. Yellowlees Douglas, American author of hypertext fiction
- John Douglas (bishop of Salisbury) (1721–1807), Scottish man of letters and Anglican bishop
- John E. Douglas (born 1945), American criminal profiler and writer
- Keith Douglas (1920–1944), English poet of World War II
- Lawrence Douglas (born 1959), American legal scholar and author
- Marian Douglas (1842–1913), American poet and short story writer
- Marjory Stoneman Douglas (1890–1998), American conservationist and writer
- Max Douglas (born 1970), Canadian comic book creator
- Michael Douglas (pen name Michael Crichton), American author
- Myra Douglas (1844–?), American writer, poet
- Norman Douglas (1868–1952), British writer
- Orville Lloyd Douglas (born 1976), Canadian essayist, poet, and writer
- Mark Douglas-Home (born 1951), Scottish editor-in-chief of The Herald in Glasgow, Scotland
- William Douglas-Home (1912–1992), British playwright

=== Music ===
- Alan Douglas (record producer), American record producer
- Ashanti (entertainer) (Ashanti Shequoiya Douglas) (born 1980), American R&B singer
- Barry Douglas (pianist) (born 1960), Northern Irish classical pianist and conductor
- Carl Douglas (born 1942), Jamaican-born singer
- Carol Douglas (born 1948), American singer
- Charles Douglass (1910–2003), American sound engineer
- Chip Douglas (Douglas Farthing Hatlelid, born 1942), American songwriter, musician, and record producer
- Chris Douglas (musician) (born 1974), American musician
- Clementine Douglas (born 1998), an American singer-songwriter
- Craig Douglas (1941–2026), English singer
- Dave Douglas (drummer), American drummer
- Dave Douglas (trumpeter) (born 1963), American jazz composer and trumpeter
- Jack Douglas (music producer) (1945–2026), American record producer
- Jahméne Douglas, English singer, contestant of The X Factor (UK), series 9
- James Douglas (composer) (1932–2022), Scottish composer
- Jenny Douglas (born 1991), Scottish singer and actress
- Jerry Douglas (born 1955), American country music and bluegrass musician
- Jimmy Douglass, American record producer
- Johnny Douglas (conductor) (1920–2003), English composer, musical director and conductor
- K. C. Douglas (1913–1975), American blues musician
- Lee Douglas (born 1975), English singer
- Roy Douglas (1907–2015), British composer, pianist and arranger
- Steve Douglas (saxophonist) (1938–1993), American saxophonist, flautist and clarinetist
- Tom Douglas (songwriter), American country music songwriter
- Tony Douglas (singer) (1929–2013), American country music singer

=== Stage, screen, and radio ===
- Aaron Douglas (actor) (born 1971), Canadian actor
- Angela Douglas (born Angela McDonagh in 1940), English actress
- Bill Douglas (1934–1991), Scottish film director
- Cameron Douglas (born 1978), American actor and drug dealer
- Christopher Douglas (born c. 1955), United Kingdom actor and writer
- Clare Douglas, British film editor
- Colin Douglas (actor) (1912–1991), British stage and television actor
- D. C. Douglas (born 1966), American actor and director
- Don Douglas (actor) (1905–1945), Scottish film actor
- Donald Douglas (Scottish actor) (born 1933), British actor
- Donna Douglas (1933–2015), American actress
- Eric Douglas (1958–2004), American actor, son of Kirk Douglas
- Gordon Douglas (director) (1907–1993), American actor and director
- Hal Douglas (1924–2014), American voice actor
- Hazel Douglas, British actress
- Illeana Douglas (born 1965), American actress
- Jack Douglas (actor) (1927–2008), English actor
- James Douglas (actor) (1929–2016), American soap opera actor
- Jason Douglas, American stage, film, and voice actor
- Jeff Douglas (born 1971), Canadian actor and broadcaster
- Joanna Douglas (born 1983), Canadian actress
- Joel Douglas (born January 23, 1947), American movie producer, son of Kirk Douglas and Diana Dill
- Kirk Douglas (1916–2020), American actor, producer, director, and author
- Kyan Douglas (born 1970), American cosmetologist
- Malcolm Douglas (1941–2010), Australian wildlife documentary film maker, and crocodile hunter.
- Meghan Douglas (born 1970), American fashion model
- Melvyn Douglas (1901–1981), American actor
- Michael Douglas (born 1944), American actor and producer, son of Kirk Douglas and Diana Dill
- Michael Keaton, born Michael John Douglas (born 1951), American actor
- Mike Douglas (1925–2006), American entertainer and former TV talk-show host
- Paul Douglas (actor) (1907–1959), American actor
- Paul Douglas (cameraman) (1958–2006), British CBS News cameraman
- Pavel Douglas (born 1951), Polish-born, British-based actor
- Peter Douglas (born 1955), American television and film producer, son of Kirk Douglas
- Robert Douglas (actor) (1909–1999), stage and film actor, television director and producer
- Róbert Ingi Douglas (born 1973), Icelandic film director
- Saba Douglas-Hamilton (born 1970), television presenter and naturalist
- Sam Douglas (born 1957), British/American film, stage and video game actor
- Sarah Douglas (actress) (born 1952), English actress
- Sharon Douglas (1920–2016), American film and radio actress
- Shirley Douglas (1934–2020), Canadian actress, former wife of Donald Sutherland, mother of Kiefer Sutherland
- Steve Douglas (sportscaster), Canadian sportscaster
- Suzzanne Douglas (1957–2021), American film, television and stage actress
- Tim Douglas, Canadian actor who was a cast member on the Canadian sketch comedy TV series You Can't Do That on Television
- Warren Douglas (1911–1997), born Warren Douglas Wandberg was an American actor, novelist, lyricist and screenwriter
- Vivien Endicott-Douglas (born 1990), Canadian actress
- Martha Howe-Douglas, British actress

== Business ==
- Donald Wills Douglas Sr. (1892–1981), American-born Scottish businessman, founder of Douglas Aircraft
- Donald Wills Douglas Jr. (1917–2004), American businessman, son of Donald Wills Douglas Sr.
- Gustaf Douglas (born 1938), Swedish businessman, vice chairman and largest single shareholder in security firm Securitas AB
- James Douglas (businessman) (1837–1918), Canadian mining engineer and businessman
- James Douglas Jr. (1868–1949), Canadian-born American businessman and mining executive in Canada, US and Mexico
- Louis Douglas (1889–1939), American dancer, choreographer, and music businessman
- Raymond E. Douglas (1948–2007), executive for The New York Times
- Walter Donald Douglas (1861–1912), American businessman and Titanic casualty

== Law ==
- Andrew Grant Douglas (1932–2021), Republican justice of the Ohio Supreme Court
- Byrd Douglas (1894–1965), American college baseball and football coach as well as a judge
- Charles Gywnne "Chuck" Douglas III (born 1942), trial lawyer and a former United States Representative
- Lori Douglas, Manitoba judge
- Robert Dick Douglas (1875–1960), American lawyer and son of Robert M. Douglas
- Robert M. Douglas (1849–1917), American judge, North Carolina Supreme Court justice
- Samuel Douglas (1781–1833), Pennsylvania lawyer and state attorney general
- Wallace B. Douglas (1852–1930), American judge, Minnesota Supreme Court justice and Minnesota Attorney General
- William O. Douglas (1898–1980), American associate justice of the Supreme Court

== Military ==
- Captain Andrew Snape Douglas (1761–1797), Scottish sea captain in the Royal Navy
- Sir Archibald Lucius Douglas (1842–1913), Canadian officer of the British Navy
- Lt. Col. Campbell Mellis Douglas (1840–1909), Canadian recipient of the Victoria Cross
- Rear-Admiral Sir Charles Douglas, 1st Baronet of Carr, officer in the Royal Navy
- General Sir Charles W. H. Douglas (1850–1914), Chief of the Imperial General Staff (CIGS)
- Henry Kyd Douglas (1838–1903), Confederate States Army officer
- Brigadier Douglas Campbell Douglas (1854–1927), 217th Infantry Brigade
- General Sir Howard Douglas (1776–1861), British general and colonial administrator
- Sir James Douglas, Lord of Douglas (James 'the Good', 1286–1330), Scottish soldier and knight in the Scottish wars of independence
- Sir James Douglas, 1st Baronet (1703–1787), Commodore for Newfoundland and Labrador
- James H. Douglas Jr. (1899–1988), United States Secretary of the Air Force and United States Deputy Secretary of Defense
- James Postell Douglas: Confederate Captain of the First Texas Artillery Battery, farmer, founder of the Tyler Tap Railroad, and president of the Texas and Gulf Short Line Railroad
- Lord James Douglas (1617–1645), son of the 1st Marquess of Douglas
- Sir John Douglas (died 1814), Royal Marine officer
- General Sir John Douglas of Glenfinart (1817–1888), Commander of the troops in the North British District
- Admiral John Erskine Douglas (c. 1758 – 1847), British naval officer
- Admiral John Leigh Douglas (1741–1810), British naval officer
- Major-General John Primrose Douglas (1908–1975), Honorary Surgeon to the Queen
- Lieutenant-General Sir Kenneth MacKenzie Douglas, 1st Baronet of Glenbervie (1754–1833), born Kenneth MacKenzie
- Matthew Douglas, 7th Laird of Mains (c. 1519 – after 1571), Scottish soldier
- Lt. Col. Montagu William Douglas (1863–1957), British soldier and colonial administrator in India
- Lt. General Sir Neil Douglas (1779/80–1853)
- Vice-Admiral Sir Percy Douglas (1876–1939), British naval officer, Hydrographer of the Navy
- Admiral Peter John Douglas (1787–1858), British naval officer
- Admiral Robert Gordon Douglas (1829–1910), British Royal Navy officer, Admiral Superintendent of Malta Dockyard in 1887.
- Field Marshal Robert Douglas (1727–1809), Scottish-born career soldier and field marshal of the Netherlands
- Marshal of the Royal Air Force Sholto Douglas, 1st Baron Douglas of Kirtleside (1893–1969), British air force officer
- Brigadier General Sir Thomas Monteath Douglas (1788–1868), army officer in the East India Company
- Major-General Sir William Douglas KCMG, CB, DSO (13 August 1858 – 1920)
- Col. William Douglas of Balgillo (c. 1778–1818), British Army officer during the Napoleonic Wars
- William Douglas of Fingland (1672 – c. 1760), Scottish soldier
- Brigadier-General William Douglas of Kirkness (c. 1690 – 1747), Member of Parliament and soldier
- Major General Sir William Douglas of Bonjedward and Timpendean (1770–1834), British Army officer
- Lt. Col. Angus Douglas-Hamilton (1863–1915), Scottish soldier and posthumous recipient of the Victoria Cross
- Admiral Lord Charles Montagu Douglas Scott (1839–1911), Commander-in-Chief, Plymouth
- Admiral The Honourable Sir Cyril Douglas-Pennant (1894–1961), Commander-in-Chief, The Nore
- General Count Archibald Douglas-Stjernorp, Swedish military
- Violet Douglas-Pennant (1865–1945), British philanthropist and commandant of the Women's Royal Air Force

== Nobility ==
- Agnes Douglas, Countess of Argyll (1574–1607), Scottish noblewoman
- Archibald I, Lord of Douglas (died c. 1238), Scottish nobleman
- Sir Archibald Douglas (died 1333) (k. 1333), Guardian of Scotland, leader of Scots army at Halidon Hill
- Archibald Douglas, 1st Duke of Douglas (1694–1761), Scottish nobleman
- Archibald Douglas, 1st Earl of Forfar (1653–1712), Scottish peer
- Archibald Douglas, 1st Earl of Ormond (1609–1655), Scottish Earl of Angus
- Archibald Douglas, 2nd Earl of Forfar (1692–1715)
- Archibald Douglas, 3rd Earl of Douglas (Archibald the Grim, c. 1328–1400), Scottish nobleman
- Archibald Douglas, 4th Earl of Douglas (1372–1424), Scottish nobleman and warlord, Duke of Touraine
- Archibald Douglas, 5th Earl of Douglas (1390–1439), Scottish nobleman, de jure Duke of Touraine
- Archibald Douglas, 5th Earl of Angus (1453–1514), warden of the east marches
- Archibald Douglas, 6th Earl of Angus (1490–1557)
- Archibald Douglas, 8th Earl of Angus and 5th Earl of Morton (1556–1588)
- Archibald Douglas, 8th Marquess of Queensberry (1818–1858)
- Archibald Douglas of Glenbervie, Scottish nobleman
- Archibald Douglas of Kilspindie (1475–1536), known as Greysteil
- Andrew Douglas of Hermiston (died before 1277)
- Charles Douglas, 5th Lord Mordington (died after 1746)
- Charles Douglas, 6th Marquess of Queensberry (1777–1837), great-great-great-great-grandson of the 1st Earl of Queensberry
- Charles Douglas, 3rd Duke of Queensberry and 2nd Duke of Dover (1698–1778)
- David Douglas, 7th Earl of Angus (c. 1515 – 1558), grandson of George, Master of Douglas
- David Douglas, 12th Marquess of Queensberry (born 1929)
- Dunbar Douglas, 4th Earl of Selkirk (1722–1799), grandnephew of 3rd Earl of Selkirk
- Dunbar Douglas, 6th Earl of Selkirk (1809–1885)
- Elizabeth Douglas, Countess of Erroll (died 1631)
- Frances Douglas, Lady Douglas (1750–1817), wife of Archibald Douglas, 1st Baron Douglas
- Francis Douglas, 11th Marquess of Queensberry (1896–1954), son of the 10th Marquess of Queensberry
- George Douglas, 1st Earl of Angus (1378–1402)
- George Douglas, 4th Earl of Angus (1429–1462)
- George Douglas, Master of Angus (1469–1513)
- George Douglas, 13th Earl of Morton (1662–1738), younger brother of the 12th Earl of Morton
- George Douglas, 16th Earl of Morton (1761–1827)
- George Douglas, 17th Earl of Morton (1789–1858), grandson of the 14th Earl of Morton
- George Douglas of Pittendreich (died 1552), father of James Douglas, 4th Earl of Morton and Regent of Scotland.
- Henry Douglas, Earl of Drumlanrig (1722.1754), son of Charles Douglas, 3rd Duke of Queensberry, 2nd Duke of Dover and a soldier
- Hugh the Dull, Lord of Douglas (1294–1342/1346)
- James Douglas, 2nd Earl of Douglas (1358–1388), influential lord in the Kingdom of Scotland
- James Douglas, 7th Earl of Douglas (1371–1443)
- James Douglas, 1st Lord Dalkeith (born after 1372, died before 22 May 1441)
- James Douglas, 9th Earl of Douglas (1426–1488)
- James Douglas, 1st Earl of Morton (died 1493)
- James Douglas, 3rd Earl of Angus (1426)–1446
- James Douglas, 3rd Earl of Morton (died 1548)
- James Douglas, 7th Baron Drumlanrig (died 1578), son of the 6th Baron Drumlanrig
- James Douglas, 4th Earl of Morton (c. 1525 – 1581), younger brother of 7th Earl of Angus; the last of the four regents of Scotland during the minority of King James VI
- James Douglas, 2nd Marquess of Douglas (1646–1699)
- James Douglas, 3rd Marquess of Queensberry (1697–1715), lunatic and cannibal
- James Douglas, Earl of Angus (1671–1692), Scottish nobleman and soldier, son of the previous
- James Douglas, 2nd Duke of Queensberry and 1st Duke of Dover (1662–1711)
- James Douglas, 14th Earl of Morton (c. 1703 – 1768)
- John Douglas, 2nd Earl of Morton (died 1513)
- John Douglas, 7th Marquess of Queensberry (1779–1856), younger brother of the 6th Marquess of Queensberry
- John Douglas, 9th Marquess of Queensberry (1844–1900), Scottish nobleman
- John Douglas, 21st Earl of Morton (1927–2016), grandson of the 19th Earl of Morton
- John Douglas, Lord of Balvenie (c. 1433 – 1463), son of James Douglas, 7th Earl of Douglas
- Margaret, Duchess of Douglas
- Margaret Douglas (1515–1578), the daughter of Archibald Douglas, 6th Earl of Angus, and Margaret Tudor
- Margaret Douglas, Fair Maid of Galloway (died c. 1474), Scottish noblewoman, a member of the Black Douglas family
- Percy Douglas, 10th Marquess of Queensberry (1868–1920), son of the 9th Marquess of Queensberry
- Robert Douglas, 8th Earl of Morton (died 1649), son of the 7th Earl of Morton
- Robert Douglas, Viscount Belhaven(executed 1584), Gentlemen of the Bedchamber
- Sholto Douglas (d.unknown), mythical progenitor of the House of Douglas
- Sholto Douglas, 19th Earl of Morton (1844–1935), son of the 18th Earl of Morton
- Sholto Douglas, 15th Earl of Morton (1732–1774)
- Stewart Sholto Douglas, 22nd Earl of Morton (born 1952)
- Thomas Douglas, 5th Earl of Selkirk (1771–1820), Scottish philanthropist who sponsored immigrant settlements in Canada
- William I, Lord of Douglas (died c. 1214)
- William Longleg, Lord of Douglas (c. 1220 – c. 1274), Scoto-Norman nobleman
- William the Hardy, Lord of Douglas (c. 1240 – 1299), Governor of Berwick Castle, Scottish warrior and freedom-fighter
- William IV, Lord of Douglas (died 1333)
- William Douglas, Lord of Liddesdale (c. 1300 – 1353)
- William Douglas, 1st Earl of Douglas (died 1384)
- William Douglas, 1st Baron Drumlanrig (died 1427), illegitimate son of the 2nd Earl of Douglas
- William Douglas, 2nd Earl of Angus (c. 1398 – 1437)
- William Douglas, 6th Earl of Douglas (c. 1424 – 1440)
- William Douglas, 8th Earl of Douglas (1425–1452)
- William Douglas, 9th Earl of Angus (died 1571)
- William Douglas, 6th Earl of Morton (1540–1606)
- William Douglas, 9th Earl of Morton (died bef 1 Nov 1681)
- William Douglas, 10th Earl of Angus (1553–1611)
- William Douglas, 1st Earl of Queensberry (c. 1582 – 1640)
- William Douglas, 7th Earl of Morton (1582–1648)
- William Douglas, 1st Marquess of Douglas (1590–1660), son of the 10th Earl of Angus
- William Douglas, 1st Duke of Queensberry (1637–1695), Scottish politician
- William Douglas, 4th Duke of Queensberry (1724–1810), son of 2nd Earl of March
- William Douglas of Cluny (c. 1428 – c. 1475), guardian to King James III of Scotland
- William Douglas of Glenbervie (c. 1473 – 1513)
- Alexander Douglas-Hamilton, 10th Duke of Hamilton (1767–1852), Scottish politician
- Angus Douglas-Hamilton, 15th Duke of Hamilton (1938–2010)
- Alexander Douglas-Hamilton, 16th Duke of Hamilton (born 1978)
- Alfred Douglas-Hamilton, 13th Duke of Hamilton and 9th Earl of Selkirk (1862–1940)
- Douglas Douglas-Hamilton, 8th Duke of Hamilton (1756–1799)
- Douglas Douglas-Hamilton, 14th Duke of Hamilton (1903–1973), aviator, politician and landowner
- Frank Douglas-Pennant, 5th Baron Penrhyn (1865–1967)
- George Douglas-Hamilton, 10th Earl of Selkirk (1906–1994), younger son of the 13th Duke of Hamilton
- George Douglas-Pennant, 2nd Baron Penrhyn (1836–1907), landowner who played a prominent part in the Welsh slate industry
- Hugh Douglas-Pennant, 4th Baron Penrhyn (1894–1949)
- James Douglas-Hamilton, Baron Selkirk of Douglas (briefly 11th Earl of Selkirk) (born 1942), younger son of the 14th Duke of Hamilton and Brandon
- Malcolm Douglas-Pennant, 6th Baron Penrhyn (1908–2003), Welsh peer, soldier, rifleman, and farmer
- Lady Mary Victoria Douglas-Hamilton (1850–1922)
- Muriel Douglas-Pennant (1869–1962), Speaker of the House of Commons
- Nina Douglas-Hamilton, Duchess of Hamilton and Brandon (1878–1951), the daughter of Major Robert Poore
- William Douglas-Hamilton, Duke of Hamilton and 1st Earl of Selkirk (1635–1694)
- William Douglas-Hamilton, 12th Duke of Hamilton and 8th Earl of Selkirk (1845–1895)
- David Douglas-Home, 15th Earl of Home (1943–2022), heir general to the House of Douglas
- Cospatrick Douglas-Home, 11th Earl of Home (1799–1881), Scottish diplomat and politician
- Rachel Douglas-Home, 27th Baroness Dacre (1929–2012), English peeress
- James Hamilton, 4th Duke of Hamilton (1658–1712), eldest son of William Douglas, Duke of Hamilton and his wife Anne
- Henry Douglas-Scott-Montagu, 1st Baron Montagu of Beaulieu (1832–1905), British Conservative politician
- Alice Christabel Montagu Douglas Scott (1901–2004), Princess Alice, Duchess of Gloucester
- Louisa Montagu Douglas Scott, Duchess of Buccleuch 1836–1912, wife of 6th Duke of Buccleuch
- Mary Montagu Douglas Scott, Duchess of Buccleuch (1900–1993), wife of 8th Duke of Buccleuch
- Richard Walter John Montagu Douglas Scott, 10th Duke of Buccleuch (Born 1954)
- Simon Douglas-Pennant, 7th Baron Penrhyn, (Born 1938)
- Walter Montagu Douglas Scott, 5th Duke of Buccleuch (1806–1884), British politician and nobleman
- Walter Montagu Douglas Scott, 8th Duke of Buccleuch (1894–1973), a politician and Conservative peer

== Politics ==
- Sir Adye Douglas (1815–1906), Australian lawyer and politician, and first class cricketer
- Albert B. Douglas (1912–1971), Canadian MP
- Alec Douglas-Home (1903–1995), British baron, politician, and prime minister
- Alexander Douglas (Orkney and Shetland), MP for Orkney and Shetland, Scotland
- Archibald Douglas, 1st Baron Douglas (1748–1827), Member of Parliament for Forfarshire
- Archibald Douglas, 13th of Cavers (died 1741), Receiver-general for Scotland and MP for Dumfries Burghs
- Archibald Douglas (1707–1778) (Lt Gen Archibald Douglas of Kirkton), MP for Dumfriesshire, Scotland
- Benjamin Douglas (1816–1894), Lieutenant Governor of Connecticut
- Beverly B. Douglas (1822–1878), Virginian politician
- Boyd Douglas (born 1950), politician in Northern Ireland
- Carl Douglas (1908–1961), Swedish diplomat
- Charles Douglas, 3rd Baron Douglas (1775–1848), MP for Lanarkshire, and a cricketer
- Charles Douglas (mayor) (1852–1917), Mayor of Vancouver
- Charles Douglas III (born 1942), U.S. Representative from New Hampshire and New Hampshire Supreme Court Associate Justice
- Charles Eurwicke Douglas 1806–1887, English MP
- Charles Mackinnon Douglas (1865–1924), Liberal MP for North West Lanarkshire
- Christian Douglas (born 1978), German politician
- Choylin Yim Douglas (elected 2024), Solomons Islands politician
- Curtis N. Douglas (1856–1919), New York politician
- Dan Douglas, Arkansas politician
- Denzil Douglas (born 1953), Prime Minister of St Kitts and Nevis
- Dick Douglas (1932–2014), Scottish politician
- Emily Taft Douglas (1899–1994), American politician, wife of Paul Douglas (below)
- Francis Douglas, Viscount Drumlanrig (1867–1894), a Scottish nobleman and Liberal politician
- Fred J. Douglas (1869–1949), United States Representative
- Frederick Douglass (1818–1895), American abolitionist, editor, orator, author, statesman, and reformer
- Helen Gahagan Douglas (1900–1980), American actress and politician
- Hezekiah Ford Douglas (1831–1865), American abolitionist, traveling speaker, political organizer, and newspaper proprietor
- Hima Douglas, Niuean politician
- Ian Douglas (politician), attorney and politician from Dominica
- James Douglas (governor) (1803–1877), Scottish-Canadian governor of the colony of Vancouver Island
- James Douglas (1878–1956), Polish diplomat
- James G. Douglas (1887–1984), Irish senator
- James Henry Douglas (died 1905), Australian politician
- James W. Douglas (1851–1883), British Columbian politician
- Janet Douglas (diplomat) (born 1960), British diplomat and ambassador
- Jerzy Hardie-Douglas (born 1951), Polish politician
- Jim Douglas (born 1952), American politician
- John Douglas Sr. (born c. 1636), Maryland, US, politician
- John Douglas (died 1838) (c. 1774 – 1838), MP for Orford and Minehead, England
- Sir John Douglas, 3rd Baronet of Kelhead (c. 1708 – 1778), MP for Dumfriesshire
- John Douglas (Queensland politician) (1828–1904), Premier of Queensland, Australia
- John Douglas of Broughton (died 1832), Scottish politician
- John Henry Douglas (1851–1930), Canadian politician and farmer
- John St Leger Douglas (died 1783, MP for Hindon and Weobly
- Lewis Williams Douglas (1894–1974), American politician, diplomat, businessman and academic
- Lincoln Douglas, MP, Trinidad and Tobago Parliament politician
- Count Ludvig Douglas, riksmarskalk and Minister of Foreign Affairs of Sweden, peer of the Grand Duchy of Baden
- Malcolm Douglas (born 1941), New Zealand politician of the Labour Party
- Mark Douglas (Wisconsin) (1829–1900), American politician
- Melia Likoswe Douglas, Malawian politician
- Melissa Douglas, American politician
- Michael Douglas (politician), (1940–1992), Dominican politician
- Nate Douglas (born 2000), American politician and educator
- Paul Douglas (1892–1976), American economist and United States Senator from Illinois
- Robert Douglas (New Zealand politician), 19th-century New Zealand MP
- Robert van Breugel Douglas (1791–1873), 19th-century Dutch member of the Council of State and Publicist.
- Roger Douglas (born 1937), former New Zealand politician
- Rosie Douglas (1941–2000), Dominican politician
- Roy Douglas (1924–2020), British Liberal politician and academic
- Samuel J. Douglas (1812–1873), American politician and jurist
- Stephen A. Douglas (1813–1861), American politician
- Tommy Douglas (1904–1986), Canadian politician, Premier of Saskatchewan, and father of Shirley Douglas
- Walburga Habsburg Douglas (born 1958), Austrian-Swedish politician, member of the Swedish parliament since 2006
- Walter Douglas (governor) (1670–1739), Leeward Islands
- William Bloomfield Douglas (1822–1906), Australian public servant and naval officer
- Sir William Douglas, 4th Baronet of Kelhead, MP for Dumfries Burghs
- William Douglas (died 1821) of Almorness, British MP
- William Douglas (Northern Ireland politician) (1923–2013), unionist politician in Northern Ireland
- William Lewis Douglas (1845–1924), American businessman and politician
- Lord William Douglas (William Robert Keith Douglas, 1783–1859), British MP
- Chief Alabo Graham-Douglas (1939–2022), Nigerian politician
- Aretas Akers-Douglas, 1st Viscount Chilston (1851–1926), British statesman and politician
- Aretas Akers-Douglas, 2nd Viscount Chilston (1876–1947), British diplomat
- Bruce Douglas-Mann (1927–2000), British politician
- Edward Douglas-Pennant, 1st Baron Penrhyn (1800–1886), Scottish landowner in Wales, and politician
- Edward Douglas-Pennant, 3rd Baron Penrhyn (1864–1927), British Conservative politician
- Edward Douglas-Scott-Montagu, 3rd Baron Montagu of Beaulieu (1926–2015), a British Conservative politician
- Henry Douglas-Scott-Montagu, 1st Baron Montagu of Beaulieu (1832–1905), a British Conservative Party politician
- Jakub Hardie-Douglas (born 1982), Polish politician
- James Douglas-Hamilton, Baron Selkirk of Douglas (born 1942), Scottish nobleman, Conservative politician
- John Douglas-Scott-Montagu, 2nd Baron Montagu of Beaulieu (1826–1929), a British Conservative politician
- Lord Malcolm Douglas-Hamilton (1919–1964), Scottish nobleman and politician
- Walter Francis John Montagu Douglas Scott, 9th Duke of Buccleuch (1923–2007), Scottish Peer, politician and landowner
- William Montagu Douglas Scott, 6th Duke of Buccleuch (1831–1914), Scottish Member of Parliament

== Sport ==
- Allan Douglas (born 1958), Bermudian cricketer
- Allan Douglas (born 1987), Bermudian cricketer
- Andy Douglas (born 1978), American professional wrestler
- Angus Douglas (1889–1918), Scottish international footballer
- Archibald Hugh "Toots" "Tootsie" Douglas (1885–1972), American college football and baseball player
- Anthony Douglas (born 1985), British Olympic speed skater
- Atle Douglas (born 1968), Norwegian athlete
- Barry Douglas (footballer) (born 1989), Scottish footballer
- Billy Douglas (rugby union) (1863–1945), Welsh international rugby player
- Bob Douglas (1882–1979), US-American sports manager, founder of the New York Renaissance
- Bobby Douglas (1942–2026), American Olympian wrestler and coach
- Bobby Douglass (born 1947), American football player
- Bruce Douglas (rugby union) (born 1980), Scottish rugby union footballer
- Bryan Douglas (born 1934), English footballer
- C. A. Douglas (1905–2000), American football coach
- C.H. "Pickles" Douglas (1886–1954), English cricketer and boxing referee
- Caimin Douglas (born 1977), Dutch sprinter
- Caleb Douglas (born 2003), American football player
- Chris Douglas (born 1989), Bermudian cricketer
- Colin Douglas (born 1962), Scottish footballer
- Darl Douglas (born 1979), Dutch footballer
- Dave Douglas (golfer) (1918–1978), American professional golfer
- David Douglas (fighter) (born 1982), American mixed martial artist (also known as "Tarzan" Douglas")
- David Douglas (rower) (born 1947), Australian rower
- Demario Douglas (born 2000), American football player
- Desmond Douglas (born 1955), British table tennis player
- Dewayne Douglas (1931–2000), American football player
- Florence Douglas, Trinidadian cricketer
- Gabby Douglas (born 1995), American gymnast
- Glenn Douglas (1928–2017), Canadian Football League player
- Guillermo Douglas (1909–1967), Uruguayan Olympic rower
- Harry Douglas (born 1984), American footballer
- Hugh Douglas (American football) (born 1971), American NFL football player
- Jack Douglas (ice hockey) (1930–2003), Canadian ice hockey defenceman
- Jacob Douglas (born 2005), New Zealand racing driver
- James "Buster" Douglas (born 1960), American heavyweight boxer
- James Douglas (cricketer) (1870–1958), English cricketer
- Jason Douglas (boxer) (born 1980), Canadian boxer
- Jimmy Douglas (American soccer) (1898–1972), American soccer goalkeeper
- Jimmy Douglas (Canadian soccer) (born 1948), Scottish-Canadian soccer player and coach
- Jimmy Douglas (Scottish footballer) (1859–1919), Scottish footballer
- John Douglas (rugby union) (born 1934), Scottish rugby player
- John Douglas (sportsman) (born 1951), Australian footballer and cricketer
- Johnny Douglas (1882–1930), English cricketer
- Jon Douglas (1936–2010), American tennis player
- Jonathan Douglas (born 1981), Irish football player
- Kane Douglas (born 1989), Australian rugby union footballer
- Katherine Douglas (rower) (born 1989), British rower
- Katie Douglas (basketball) (born 1979), American Women's National Basketball Association player
- Keith Douglas (curler), Scottish curler
- Kent Douglas (1936–2009), Canadian ice hockey player
- Larry Douglas (baseball) (Lawrence Howard Douglas; 1890–1949), Major League Baseball pitcher
- Larry Douglas (American football) (born 1957), American footballer
- Laura Douglas (artist) (1886–1962), American painter
- Laura Douglas (athlete) (born 1983), Welsh hammer thrower
- Luke Douglas (born 1986), Australian rugby league footballer
- Mark Douglas (born 1968), New Zealand cricketer
- Marques Douglas (born 1977), American footballer
- Marshall Douglas (born 1940), Scottish golfer
- Nathan Douglas (born 1982), British triple jumper
- Otis Douglas (1911–1989), American football player
- Phil Douglas (baseball) (1890–1952), American baseball player
- no:Quincy Douglas (born 1975), British-born Norwegian sprinter
- Rab Douglas (born 1972), Scottish football goalkeeper
- Rasul Douglas (born 1994), American football player
- René R. Douglas (born 1967), Panamanian jockey
- Richard Douglas (born 1987), Footballer
- Robert Douglas (American football) (born 1982), American football player
- Robert Noel Douglas (1868–1957), English cricketer and priest
- Rowley Douglas (born 1977), British Olympic rower
- Ruben Douglas (1979–2024), Panamanian-American professional basketball player
- Ryan Douglas (born 1993) Australian Speedway rider
- Sean Douglas (born 1972), New Zealand association football player
- Shane Douglas (born 1964), American professional wrestler
- Steve Douglas (skateboarder), British skateboarder, company owner and industry mogul
- Struan Douglas (born 1966), Scottish rugby league international
- Stuart Douglas (born 1978), English football player
- Taz Douglas (born 1984), Australian race driver
- Toney Douglas (born 1986), American professional basketball player
- Troy Douglas (born 1962), Dutch sprinter
- Whetu Douglas (born 1991), New Zealand rugby union player
- Ian Akers-Douglas (1902–1952), English cricketer
- Thomas Douglas-Powell (born 1992), Australian volleyball player

== Science ==
=== Biology ===
- Claude Gordon Douglas (1882–1963), British physiologist
- David Douglas (1799–1834), Scottish botanist
- Virginia Douglas (1927–2017), Canadian psychologist and emeritus professor at McGill University

=== Earth sciences ===
- R. J. W. Douglas (1920–1979), Canadian geologist

=== Engineering ===
- C. H. Douglas (1879–1952), Scottish engineer and pioneer of the social credit concept
- Donald Wills Douglas Sr. (1892–1981), American aircraft industrialist

=== Mathematics ===
- Jesse Douglas (1897–1965), American mathematician and professor of mathematics
- Ronald G. Douglas (1938–2018), American mathematician

=== Physics ===
- David Douglass, American physicist
- James Douglas (physician) (1675–1742), Scottish physician and anatomist
- Michael R. Douglas, American physicist at Rutgers University

=== Other scientists ===
- A.S. Douglas (1921–2010), British professor of computer science
- Bronwen Phyllis Douglas (born 1946), Australian ethnohistorian
- Joel S. Douglas (fl. 1977–present), American medical device inventor
- John William Douglas (1814–1905), English entomologist
- Mary Douglas (1921–2007), British anthropologist
- Vibert Douglas aka A. Vibert Douglas (1894–1988), Canadian astronomer and the first Canadian woman to become an astrophysicist
- Iain Douglas-Hamilton (1942–2025), British zoologist known for his study of elephants

== Religion ==
- Archibald Douglas, Parson of Douglas (b. before 1540 – d. after 1587), Parson, Senator and Ambassador
- Reverend Lord Archibald Edward Douglas (1850–1938), Catholic priest and orphanage manager
- Rt. Rev. the Hon. Arthur Gascoigne Douglas (1827–1905), Bishop of Aberdeen and Orkney
- Edward Douglas (bishop) (1901–1967), Scottish Roman Catholic bishop
- Gavin Douglas (1474–1522), Scottish poet and bishop
- George Douglas (priest) (1889–1973)
- Gerald Douglas (1875–1934), Bishop of Nyasaland
- Gordon Douglas (monk), Bhikkhu monk
- Henry Alexander Douglas (1821–1875), bishop
- The Very Rev Hugh Osborne Douglas (1911–1986), Honorary Chaplain to the Queen
- Ian Douglas (born 1958), bishop of the Episcopal Church in Connecticut.
- John Douglas (archbishop of St Andrews) (c. 1494 – 1574)
- John Douglas (bishop of Salisbury) (1721–1807), Scottish man of letters and Anglican bishop
- Lloyd C. Douglas (1877–1951), American minister and author
- Philip Douglas 1758–1822), British priest and academic
- Ranuccio Scotti Douglas (1597–1659), Italian Bishop
- Robert Douglas (minister) (1594–1674), Scottish minister
- Robert Douglas (bishop) (died 1716), Scottish churchman
- Robert Noel Douglas (1868–1957), English cricketer and priest
- Valentin Douglas (died 1598), Bishop of Laon and Peer of France
- Vernon Francis Douglas (1910–1943), New Zealand priest
- Wilfrid Douglas (1917–2004), missionary, linguist and translator
- William Douglas (priest) (1769?–1819), Archdeacon of Wilts

== Other fields ==
- Alexander Douglas-Douglas (1843–1914), Australian inspector of police and explorer
- Alan Douglas (journalist) (born 1951), Scottish journalist and former broadcaster
- Andrew Douglas (1736 – 10 June 1806), Scottish physician and midwife
- Ben Elbert Douglas Sr. (1894–1981), American businessman who had an airport named for his wife, Charlotte
- Betto Douglas (c. 1772 – ?), slave on the British Colony of St. Kitts
- Catherine Douglas, later "Kate" Barlass, 15th-century lady-in-waiting to the Queen of Scotland
- Charlie Douglas (Charles Edward Douglas), New Zealand explorer, surveyor, and Royal Geographical Society Gill Memorial Prize winner (1840–1916)
- David Douglas (1823–1916), Scottish publisher
- David C. Douglas (1898–1982), British historian
- David Douglas, Lord Reston (1769–1819), Adam Smith's heir
- Frank L. Douglas, Guyanese American medical doctor.
- George Douglas of Longniddry (active 1580–1610), Scottish landowner and courtier
- James Douglas (journalist) (1867–1940), British newspaper editor, author and critic
- J. Archibald Douglas (born 1866), first professor of English and history at Government College, Agra
- James Sandilands Douglas (1872–1957), Mayor of Dunedin
- James W. B. Douglas (1914–1992), British social researcher
- Jane Douglas (c. 1700 – 1762), London brothel keeper
- Janet Douglas, 17th-century Scottish woman who claimed to have second sight
- Jennifer Douglas (born 1964), American writer/producer and activist.
- John E. Douglas (born 1945), FBI agent and criminal profiler
- Josepha Williams Douglas (1860–1938), also known as Josepha Williams, American physician
- Kenneth George (Ken) Douglas (1934–2022), New Zealand trade union leader
- Linda Douglass, former director of communications for the White House Office of Health Reform
- Malcolm Douglas, 8th Laird of Mains
- Margaret Elizabeth Douglas (1934–2008), English television producer and executive
- Mark Douglas, professor of Christian ethics at Columbia Theological Seminary
- Michael Dutton Douglas (1945–1963), American road accident victim
- Richard Douglas (b1956), Civil servant
- Richard Douglas (floruit 1560–1600) Letter writer
- Robert Douglas, Provost of Lincluden, landowner, courtier, and administrator
- Sir Robert Douglas, 6th Baronet (Robert Douglas of Glenbervie, 1694–1770), Scottish genealogist
- Sir Robert Kennaway Douglas (1838–1913), Keeper of the British Museum's Department of Oriental Printed Books and Manuscripts
- Robert M. Douglas (doctor) (born 1936), Chairman of Australia 21
- Sandy Douglas (1921–2010), British professor of computer science
- Stephen Douglas (journalist), British journalist
- Sue Douglas (born 1957), British media executive and former newspaper editor
- Susan J. Douglas, American feminist academic, columnist, and cultural critic
- Walter Douglas, Scottish drug trafficker
- William Alexander Binny "Alec" Douglas (born 1929), Canadian naval historian
- William Douglas (died 1791), Scottish sea captain
- William Douglas of Whittingehame (c. 1540 – 1595), Senator of the College of Justice at Edinburgh, and a Royal conspirator.
- Alexandre-Pierre de Mackensie-Douglas or Mackenzie-Douglas, baron de Kildin (1713–1765), French chargé d'affaires in St Petersburg
- Belinda Douglas-Scott-Montagu, Baroness Montagu of Beaulieu (1932–2022), British embroiderer
- Francisco Antonio Gregorio Tudela van Breugel-Douglas (born 1955), Peruvian career diplomat
- Ian Douglas-Wilson (1912–2013), British physician and editor of The Lancet

== Fictional characters ==
- Helena Douglas, a character from the Dead or Alive video game series

== Counts Douglas in continental Europe ==
- Field Marshal Robert Douglas, Count of Skenninge
- Rosita Spencer-Churchill, Duchess of Marlborough née Douglas
- Count Gustaf Archibald Siegwart Douglas (born 1938), Swedish businessman and politician
- Count Vilhelm Archibald Douglas (1883–1960), Swedish nobleman and soldier

== See also ==
- Douglass (surname)
