= Robert Douglas =

Robert Douglas may refer to:

== Entertainment ==
- Robert Langton Douglas (1864–1951), British art critic and director of the National Gallery of Ireland
- Robert Douglas (actor) (1909–1999), British actor
- Róbert Ingi Douglas (born 1973), Icelandic film director

== Military ==
- Robert Douglas, Count of Skenninge (1611–1662), Scottish-born field-marshal in the Swedish army
- Sir Robert Douglas, 3rd Baronet (died 1692), Scottish soldier
- Robert Douglas (1727–1809), career soldier, field marshal of the Netherlands
- Robert Percy Douglas (1805–1891), British Army officer who became Lieutenant Governor of Jersey
- Robert Douglas (Royal Navy officer) (1829–1910), British admiral

== Politics and law ==
- Sir Robert Douglas of Lochleven (died 1547), Scottish courtier and landowner
- Robert Douglas, Provost of Lincluden (died 1609), Scottish landowner, courtier, and administrator
- Robert Douglas, 1st Viscount Belhaven (1573–1639), Scottish courtier
- Robert Douglas, 8th Earl of Morton (died 1649), Scottish nobleman
- Robert Douglas (British politician) (c. 1703–1745), MP for Orkney and Shetland, British army officer
- Robert Douglas (New Zealand politician) (1837–1884)
- Robert M. Douglas (judge) (1849–1917), North Carolina Supreme Court justice
- Robert Dick Douglas (1875–1960), American lawyer and son of Robert M. Douglas
- Robert Albert Douglas (1887–1959), contractor and political figure in Nova Scotia, Canada

== Science ==
- Robert Douglas (horticulturist) (1813–1897), English American horticulturalist and forestry consultant
- R. J. W. Douglas (1920–1979), Canadian geologist
- Robert M. Douglas (doctor) (born 1936), academic, researcher, and administrator

== Sports ==
- Robert Noel Douglas (1868–1957), English cricketer and priest
- Robert S. Douglas (1932–2025), American sailor
- Robert Douglas (American football) (born 1982), retired American football fullback
- Rab Douglas (born 1972), Scottish football goalkeeper
- Rob Douglas (born 1971), American speed sailor

== Other ==
- Robert Douglas (minister) (1594–1674), minister in the Church of Scotland
- Sir Robert Douglas, 6th Baronet (1694–1770), Scottish genealogist
- Robert Douglas (bishop) (died 1716), Scottish prelate
- Robert Kennaway Douglas (1838–1913), British oriental scholar
- Robert Waite Douglas (1854–1931), Canadian librarian

== See also ==
- Bob Douglas (1882–1979), American sports manager, founder of the New York Renaissance
- Bobby Douglas (1942–2026), wrestling coach
- Bobby Douglass (born 1947), American football player
- Robert Douglass Jr. (1809–1887), African-American artist and activist
