= Douglass (surname) =

Douglass is a surname. Notable people with the surname include:

- Abel Douglass (before 1849 – c. 1907), American whaler
- A. E. Douglass (1867–1962), American astronomer
- Astyanax Douglass (1897–1975), Major League Baseball catcher for the Cincinnati Reds
- Bill Douglass (1923–1994), American jazz drummer
- Bobby Douglass (born 1947), American football quarterback for the Chicago Bears
- Brooks Douglass (1963–2020), American lawyer, politician, and actor
- Charles Douglass (1910–2003), American sound engineer, credited as the inventor of the laugh track
- Charles Remond Douglass (1844–1920), African-American clerk and soldier
- Dale Douglass (1936–2022), American professional golfer
- David Douglass (physicist), American physicist
- David Douglass (1720–1786), British-American stage actor and theatre manager
- David John Douglass, British trade unionist, political activist and writer
- Dorothea Lambert Chambers (née Douglass, 1878–1960), English tennis player
- Frank Douglass (1875–1972), South African rugby union player
- Frederick Douglass (1818–1895), American abolitionist and writer
- Gregory Douglass (born 1980), American singer-songwriter
- Gordon K. (Sandy) Douglass (1904–1992), American racer, designer, and builder of sailing dinghies
- Harry Douglass, Baron Douglass of Cleveland (1902–1978), British trade unionist
- Herbert E. Douglass (1927–2014), American Seventh-day Adventist theologian
- James Nicholas Douglass (1826–1898), English civil engineer, lighthouse builder and designer
- James W. Douglass, American author, activist, and Christian theologian
- Jenn Ladisch Douglass, American politician in Illinois
- Jimmy Douglass, American recording engineer and record producer
- Joe Douglass (born 1974), American football player for the Las Vegas Gladiators
- John J. Douglass (1873–1939), member of the United States House of Representatives from Massachusetts
- John Patrick "Jack" Douglass (born 1988), American internet personality, musician and YouTuber known as "jacksfilms"
- John Thomas Douglass (1847–1886), American violinist, composer of Virginia's Ball
- John W. Douglass (born 1941), United States Air Force officer
- John Watkinson Douglass (1827–1909), American politician
- Joseph Douglass (1871–1935), African-American concert violinist
- Kate Douglass (b. 2001), American Olympic swimmer
- Kingman Douglass (1896–1971), American investment banker, member of the United States intelligence community
- Klondike Douglass (1872–1953), American Major League Baseball player born in Boston
- Lavantia Densmore Douglass (1827–1899), American social reformer
- Leon Douglass (1869–1940), American inventor
- Linda Douglass, director of communications for the White House Office of Health Reform in the Obama administration
- Lewis Henry Douglass (1840–1908), American typesetter and soldier
- Mabel Smith Douglass (1874–1933), American educator
- Maurice Douglass, American football player
- Mike Douglass (American football), American football player
- Mike Douglass (urban planner), American urban planner and social scientist
- Pat Douglass, American basketball player and coach
- Paul Douglass (1905–1988), American academic administrator
- Ralph Waddell Douglass (1895–1971), American commercial artist and university professor
- Ramona Douglass, African-American activist
- Richard Douglass (1746–1828), American militia officer and cooper
- Robyn Douglass, American actress
- Samuel T. Douglass (1814–1898), American justice
- Sara Douglass (1957–2011), Australian author
- Sarah Hallam Douglass d1773, English-born American stage actress and theatre director
- Sean Douglass, American baseball player
- Stephen Douglass, American actor
- Stu Douglass (born 1990), American-Israeli basketball player
- Susan L. Douglass, American educator and author
- William Douglass (engineer), Chief Engineer for the Commissioners of Irish Lights
- William Douglass (physician) (c. 1691–1752), American physician and pamphleteer
- William Boone Douglass (born 1864), American lawyer, engineer, surveyor, genealogist and anthropologist

== See also ==
- Douglass (disambiguation)
- Douglas (surname)
- Douglass family
