= Andrew Douglas =

Andrew or Andy Douglas may refer to:

- Andrew Douglas (director), British director
- Andrew Douglas (photographer) (born 1952), British photographer
- Andrew Douglas (physician) (1736–1806), Scottish physician
- Andrew Douglas (Royal Navy officer) (died 1725), British navy captain
- Andrew Douglas (rugby union), New Zealand rugby union coach
- Andrew Douglas (squash player) (born 1998), American squash player
- Andrew Douglas of Hermiston, medieval Scottish nobleman
- Andrew Halliday Douglas (1819–1908), Scottish physician
- Andrew Snape Douglas (1761–1797), Scottish sea captain in the Royal Navy
- Andy Douglas (judge) (1932–2021), Republican justice of the Ohio Supreme Count
- Andy Douglas (wrestler) (born 1978), retired American professional wrestler

== See also ==
- A. E. Douglass (1867–1962), American astronomer
- Andrew Douglas-Home (born 1950), Scottish former first-class cricketer
- Andrew Douglas Maclagan (1812–1900), Scottish surgeon
- Andrew Douglas Young (1881–1950), Australian accountant and stockbroker
