= Jack Douglas =

Jack Douglas may refer to:

- Jack Douglas (actor) (1927–2008), British actor and comedian
- Jack Douglas (footballer, born 1872) (1872–1905), Australian rules footballer
- Jack Douglas (footballer, born 1929) (1929–2007), Australian rules footballer
- Jack Douglas (ice hockey) (1930–2003), Canadian ice hockey player
- Jack Douglas (music producer) (1945–2026), American record producer
- Jack Douglas (writer) (1908–1989), American comedy writer
- Jon Douglas (known as Jack, 1936–2010), American tennis player and college football quarterback
- Jack Douglas (television host) (1921–1994), television host and producer

== See also ==
- Jacksfilms (John Patrick "Jack" Douglass; born 1988), American Internet personality
- John Douglas (disambiguation)
