= John Douglas =

John Douglas may refer to:

== Politics and war ==
- John Douglas, Lord of Balvenie (c. 1433–1463), Scottish soldier
- John Douglas, 2nd Earl of Morton (died 1513), Scottish nobleman
- John Douglas Sr. (1636–?), politician in Maryland
- John Douglas of Broughton (c. 1698–1732), Member of Parliament for Peeblesshire 1722–32
- Sir John Douglas, 3rd Baronet, of Kelhead (c. 1708–1778), Member of Parliament for Dumfriesshire, 1741–47
- John Erskine Douglas (c. 1758–1847), Royal Navy admiral
- John Douglas (Royal Marines officer) (died 1814), British officer involved in a scandal regarding an allegedly illegitimate child born to the Princess of Wales, Caroline of Brunswick
- John Douglas (died 1838) (1774–1838), Tory politician, Member of Parliament for Orford 1818–21 and for Minehead 1822–26
- John Douglas, 7th Marquess of Queensberry (1779–1856), Scottish Whig politician
- John Douglas (British Army officer) (1817–1888), British general
- John Douglas (Connecticut politician), member of the General Court of the Colony of Connecticut in 1669–70
- John Douglas (Queensland politician) (1828–1904), Premier of Queensland
- John Douglas (colonial administrator) (1835–1885), Irish governor of Ceylon
- John Douglas, 9th Marquess of Queensberry (1844–1900), Scottish nobleman
- John Brown Douglas (1871–1933), politician in Nova Scotia, Canada
- John Carey Douglas (1874–1926), politician in Nova Scotia, Canada
- John Henry Douglas (1851–1930), politician in Ontario, Canada
- John Taylor Douglas (1892–1976), politician in Saskatchewan, Canada
- John Douglas (Irish politician) (1912–1982), senator 1954–57
- John Douglas, 21st Earl of Morton (1927–2016), Scottish peer and landowner
- John St Leger Douglas, British member of parliament for Weobley

== Religion ==
- John Douglas (archbishop of St Andrews) (1494–1574), Scottish archbishop and Chancellor of the University of St. Andrews
- John Douglas (bishop of Salisbury) (1721–1807), Scottish bishop and literary critic
- John Waldo Douglas (1818–1883), American minister
- John Albert Douglas (1868–1956), Church of England priest

== Sport ==
- Johnny Douglas (1882–1930), English cricket captain and 1908 Olympic middleweight boxing champion
- John Douglas (baseball) (1917–1984), American baseball player
- John Douglas (boxer) (born 1971), Guyanese boxer
- John Douglas (rugby union) (1934–2025), Scottish international rugby player
- John Douglas (fencer) (born 1943), Australian Olympic fencer
- John Douglas (defensive back) (1945–2005), American football player
- John Douglas (linebacker) (born 1945), American football player
- John Douglas (sportsman) (born 1951), Australian rules footballer and cricketer
- John Douglas (basketball) (born 1956), American basketball player
- John Douglas (footballer) (born 1961), English footballer
- Jon Douglas (1936–2010), American tennis and American football player

== Other ==
- John Douglas (lithotomist) (died 1743), Scottish surgeon
- John Douglas (Scottish architect) (c. 1709–1778)
- John William Douglas (1814–1905), English entomologist
- John Douglas (English architect) (1830–1911), British architect
- Johnny Douglas (conductor) (1920–2003), English composer, musical director and string arranger
- John W. Douglas (1921–2010), American attorney and civil rights advocate
- John E. Douglas (born 1945), FBI criminal profiler
- John Douglas (conductor) (1956–2010), American conductor
- John Primrose Douglas, honorary surgeon to the Queen
- Jacksfilms (John Patrick "Jack" Douglass; born 1988), American Internet personality

== See also ==
- Jack Douglas (disambiguation)
- John Douglass (disambiguation)
- Jonathan Douglas (disambiguation)
