= Laura Douglas =

Laura Douglas may refer to:

- Laura Douglas (athlete), Welsh athlete
- Laura Douglas (artist), American painter
- Laura Douglas (singer-songwriter)
