= Joana Ntaja =

Malawian politician (born 1984)

Joana Ntaja Her Worship

Mayor of Zomba City Council
- Succeeded by: Melia Likoswe Douglas

Councillor, Zomba Central Ward

Personal details
- Born: 25 February 1984 Queen Elizabeth Central Hospital ,Blantyre, Malawi
- Died: 8 March 2015 (aged 31)
- Party: Malawi Congress Party (MCP)
- Children: 3
- Education: Lilongwe Technical College

Joana Ntaja ( 25 February 1984 - 8 March 2015) was a Malawian politician and the first female mayor of Zomba, Malawi's oldest city, between July 2014 and March 2015. She was affiliated to the Democratic Progress Party.

== Background and education ==
Ntaja was born to Cathyreen Chimgoga Chakhaza at Queen Elizabeth Central Hospital (QECH) in Blantyre, Malawi. According to an interview she granted shortly after being elected mayor, she attended a number of primary schools such as "St. Pius, St Anthony, Zomba Police and completed at Balaka Primary School". She later attended Balaka and St. Marys Secondary Schools. She then did an intermediate secretarial level course at Michiru Secretarial College. From there, she attended Lilongwe Technical College and received an Advanced Diploma in Business Management.

== Career ==
Affiliated to the Democratic Progressive Party (DPP), Ntaja served as a Councillor for Zomba Central Ward on the Zomba City Council.

On 14 July 2014, Ntaja was elected as the sixth mayor of Zomba City Council and the first female in that position.

== Personal life and death ==
Having complained of malaria and stomach complications, Ntaja was announced dead on 8 March 2015 at Mwaiwathu Private Hospital in Blantyre. She was survived by her husband, Rashid Mussa and three children

Ntaja was buried at Mteje Village in Chigumula
