= Jonathan Douglas (disambiguation) =

Jonathan Douglas (born 1981) is an Irish footballer.

Jon or Jonathan Douglas(s) may refer to:

- Jonathon Douglass (born 1981) Australian Christian musician at the Hillsong Church
- Jon Douglas (1936–2010), American tennis player and American football quarterbacker

== See also ==
- John Douglas (disambiguation)
