= The Black Dog (restaurant) =

Restaurant and tavern in Vineyard Haven on the island of Martha's Vineyard

Coordinates: 41.3892°N 70.5103°W

- Company type: Private
- Founded: January 1, 1971; 55 years ago
- Founder: Robert S. Douglas
- Headquarters: Mashpee, Massachusetts, United States
- Number of locations: 26 Stores, 2 Outlets, 5 Restaurants & Cafes
- Area served: United States
- Products: Clothing and accessories
- Owner: The Douglas Family
- Website: The Black Dog

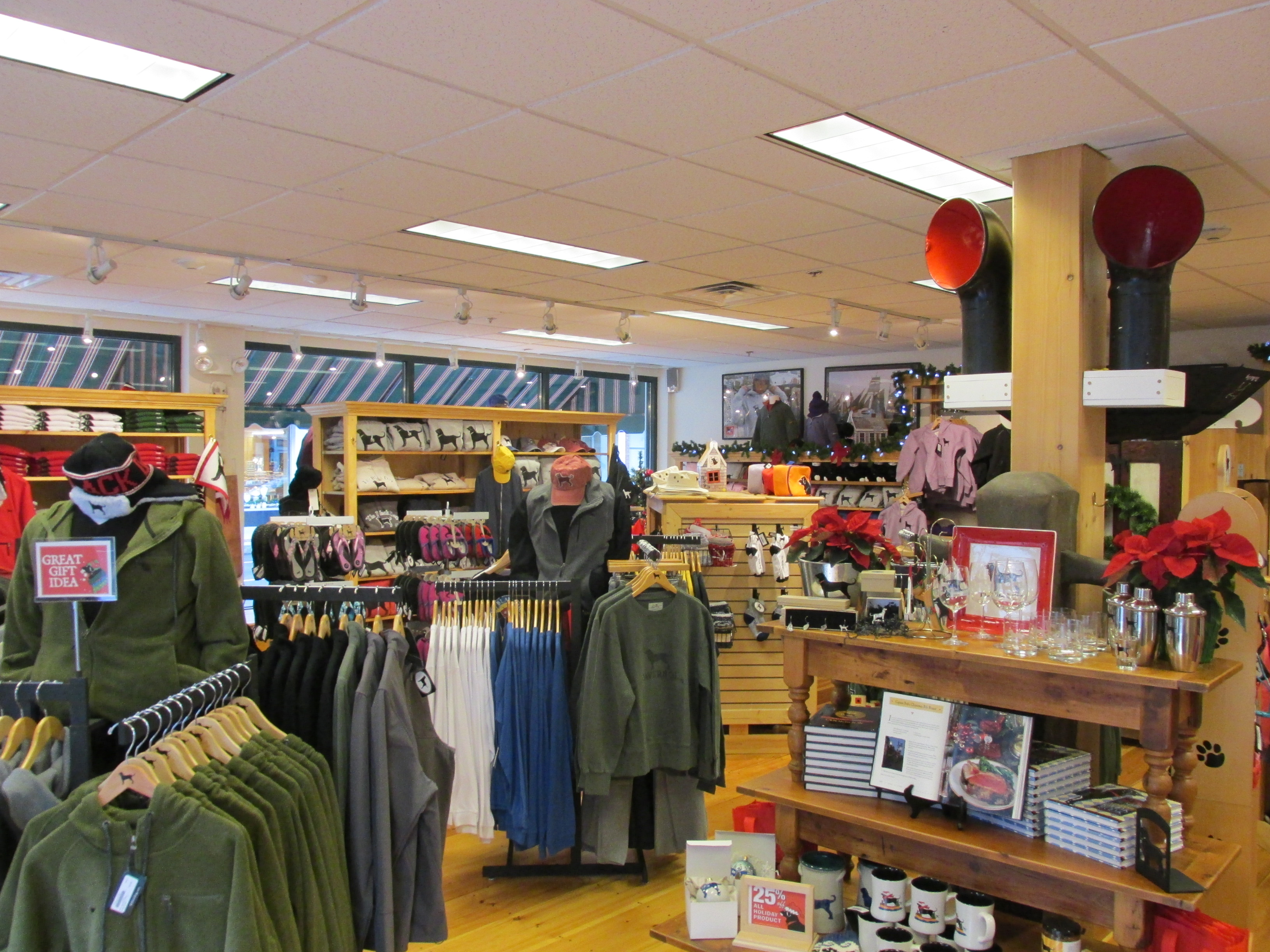
The Black Dog in Mashpee Commons

The Black Dog is a restaurant and tavern in Vineyard Haven on the island of Martha's Vineyard. The restaurant was founded in 1971 and became well known for its souvenir T-shirts featuring the logo of the eponymous black dog. They subsequently expanded to sell other products with the same logo.

== Stores ==
The Black Dog currently has many locations on Martha's Vineyard and one on the island of Nantucket, as well as in the mainland Massachusetts towns of Falmouth, Mashpee, Newburyport, Boston, Plymouth, and Chatham. They currently have two outlets in Wrentham, Massachusetts, and Merrimack, New Hampshire. Outside of Massachusetts, they have stores in Newport, Rhode Island; Portland, Maine; Kennebunkport, Maine; Portsmouth, New Hampshire; Mystic, Connecticut; Annapolis, Maryland; Savannah, Georgia; Charleston, South Carolina; and Sarasota, Florida.

The Provincetown location at 293 Commercial Street closed in December 2024. It reopened in May 2025 at 315 Commercial Street.

== History ==
The story of how The Black Dog got its name:

Robert S. Douglas was an Air Force pilot who spent summers on Martha's Vineyard. He made himself three promises after watching the ferries take people to and from the Island:

1. He would build his boat
2. He would get a dog that would sail with him, no matter the weather
3. The Vineyard would be his home

The Black Dog was named in 1967 when a black lab-boxer mix boarded Douglas's ship. She was named The Black Dog after a character in Treasure Island. In January 1971,, the captain opened an inn for sailors named after his pup, and The Black Dog was a constant fixture. From there on out, the legacy of The Black Dog continued.

The Black Dog T-shirts became well known during the 1990s as photographs of celebrities wearing the shirts began appearing in national publications. For example, a photograph of then-President Bill Clinton jogging while wearing one was distributed by national wire services. Black Dog merchandise became part of the Lewinsky scandal, as items from the store were purchased by Bill Clinton and given to Monica Lewinsky.

Marketing at The Black Dog was effective. During the early 1990s, the merchandise was only sold at the Martha's Vineyard location. Only a limited number of people were allowed in the store at one time, so lines formed down the wooden fenced ramp that ran from the front door. While waiting in line, visitors were given catalogs to browse. Nowadays, the merchandise is also available at "mainland" stores on Cape Cod, in Mystic and Newport, and online.

In 2000, The Black Dog released a cookbook called The Black Dog Summer on the Vineyard Cookbook (ISBN 0316339326). In 2006, The Black Dog recalled approximately 9700 children's sweatshirts because they had a drawstring that posed a strangulation hazard. When Black Dog continued selling the clothing, the CPSC hit the company with a $50,000 fine. The New England Multihull Association and The Black Dog host a 22-mile yachting race from Vineyard Haven to Edgartown and back called the Black Dog Dash.

It inspired author J.B. Spooner to create a children's book series consisting of three stories about The Black Dog. The first book, The Story of the Little Black Dog, is about how Captain Douglas got the black puppy. The second book, The Little Black Dog Buccaneer, is about the adventures the Captain and his dog have together. The third book, The Little Black Dog Has Puppies, is about The Black Dog and her love for her new puppies.

== Awards ==
In 2005, The Black Dog was awarded the Retailer of the Year Award by the Retailers Association of Massachusetts.
