= 1979 Grand National =

English steeplechase horse race

- Grand National
- Location: Aintree
- Date: 31 March 1979
- Winning horse: Rubstic
- Starting price: 25/1
- Jockey: Maurice Barnes
- Trainer: (Scotland) John Leadbetter
- Owner: (Scotland) John Douglas
- Conditions: Good to Soft

External videos
- First 12 Fences (BBC)
- Closing Stages (BBC)
- Coverage of the 1979 Grand National by British Movietone
- National Colours

It's anybody's race as they race into the final furlong, and it's Rubstic on the nearside with the advantage over Zongalero and the weakening Rough and Tumble as they race up towards the line, it's gonna be a victory for Scotland, it's Rubstic from Zongalero in the National, and as they come to the line, Rubstic wins it..

— Commentator Peter O'Sullevan describes the climax of the 1979 National

The 1979 Grand National (officially known as the Colt Car Grand National for sponsorship reasons) was the 133rd renewal of the Grand National horse race, which took place at Aintree near Liverpool, England, on 31 March 1979.

The race was won by Rubstic who was the first ever Scottish-trained winner.

== Finishing order ==
| Position | Name | Jockey | Age | Handicap (st-lb) | SP | Distance |
|---|---|---|---|---|---|---|
| 01 | Rubstic | Maurice Barnes | 10 | 10–0 | 25/1 | |
| 02 | Zongalero | Bob Davies | 9 | 10–5 | 20/1 | |
| 03 | Rough and Tumble | John Francome | 9 | 10–7 | 14/1 | |
| 04 | The Pilgarlic | Richard Evans | 11 | 10–1 | 16/1 | |
| 05 | Wagner | Ridley Lamb | 9 | 10–0 | 50/1 | |
| 06 | Royal Frolic | John Burke | 10 | 11–10 | 25/1 | |
| 07 | Prime Justice | Keith Taylor | 9 | 10–0 | 200/1 | Last to complete |

== Non-finishers ==
| Fence | Name | Jockey | Age | Handicap (st-lb) | Starting price | Fate |
|---|---|---|---|---|---|---|
| 01 | Double Negative | Eddie Woods | 9 | 10–5 | 66/1 | Unseated Rider |
| 01 | Sandwilan | Jenny Hembrow | 11 | 10–0 | 100/1 | Fell |
| 01 | Wayward Scot | Roy Davies | 10 | 10–7 | 100/1 | Fell |
| 01 | Vindicate | Aiden O'Connell | 12 | 11–8 | 200/1 | Fell |
| 06 (Becher's Brook) | Oskard | Martin Blackshaw | 10 | 10–0 | 100/1 | Unseated Rider |
| 06 (Becher's Brook) | Purdo | Bob Champion | 08 | 10–12 | 25/1 | Fell |
| 08 (Canal Turn) | Sand Pit | Tommy Carmody | 09 | 10–7 | 22/1 | Fell |
| 10 | Drumroan | Gerry Newman | 11 | 10–4 | 20/1 | Fell |
| 15 (The Chair) | Alpenstock | Dennis Gray | 12 | 10–0 | 100/1 | Brought Down |
| 15 (The Chair) | Cartwright | Adrian Phillips | 10 | 10–0 | 200/1 | Brought Down |
| 15 (The Chair) | Godfrey Secundus | Colin Tinkler | 9 | 10–3 | 25/1 | Brought Down |
| 15 (The Chair) | Kick On | Ron Hyett | 12 | 10–0 | 50/1 | Brought Down |
| 15 (The Chair) | Kintai | Bryan Smart | 10 | 10–0 | 100/1 | Brought Down |
| 15 (The Chair) | No Gypsy | John Suthern | 10 | 10–1 | 66/1 | Hampered & Refused |
| 15 (The Chair) | Rambling Artist | David Goulding | 9 | 10–6 | 16/1 | Brought Down |
| 15 (The Chair) | The Champ | Bill Smith | 11 | 10–12 | 25/1 | Fell |
| 16 | Ben Nevis | Charlie Fenwick | 11 | 11–2 | 14/1 | Brought Down (15), Remounted, Pulled Up |
| 21 | Brown Admiral | Sam Morshead | 10 | 10–0 | 100/1 | Unseated Rider |
| 22 (Becher's Brook) | Alverton | Jonjo O'Neill | 9 | 10–13 | 6/1 F | Fell |
| 22 (Becher's Brook) | Churchtown Boy | Taffy Salaman | 12 | 10–0 | 25/1 | Fell |
| 22 (Becher's Brook) | Mr Snowman | Graham Thorner | 10 | 10–9 | 10/1 | Fell |
| 24 (Canal Turn) | Lord Browndodd | Andy Turnell | 11 | 10–3 | 25/1 | Pulled Up |
| 26 | Dromore | Peter Duggan | 11 | 10–10 | 50/1 | Refused (22), went on and Pulled Up |
| 27 (open ditch) | Artistic Prince | Philip Blacker | 8 | 10–3 | 25/1 | Fell |
| 27 (open ditch) | Coolishall | Anthony Webber | 10 | 10–2 | 12/1 | Fell |
| 29 | Flitgrove | Richard Linley | 8 | 10–1 | 50/1 | Pulled Up |
| 29 | Red Earl | James Evans | 10 | 10–0 | 50/1 | Pulled Up |

Aftermath Unfortunately, the Cheltenham Gold Cup winner Alverton broke his neck at Becher's on the second circuit and was euthanized.

== Media coverage and aftermath ==
David Coleman once again presented a special edition of Grandstand on the BBC. The favourite, Alverton, died after falling at Becher's Brook on the second circuit (fence 22) when travelling strongly. Just over two weeks earlier he had won the Cheltenham Gold Cup and was going for a famous double only achieved by, Golden Miller, in 1934. Kintai was another fatality who was brought down at fence 15 and was later euthanized.
