= Douglass =

Douglass may refer to:

== People ==
- Douglass (given name), a less common orthographic variant of Douglas
- Douglass (surname)
- Douglass family, family of Frederick Douglass
  - Frederick Douglass (1818–1895), noted abolitionist

== Places ==
In the United States:

- Douglass, Kansas
- Douglass (Memphis), a neighborhood in Memphis, Tennessee
- Douglass, Texas
- Douglass (Washington, D.C.), a neighborhood of Washington, D.C.
- Douglass Township (disambiguation)

Elsewhere:

- Mount Douglass, Antarctica
- Douglass (lunar crater), named after A. E. Douglass
- Douglass (Martian crater)

== Other uses ==
- Douglass Residential College (Rutgers University)
- Douglass House (disambiguation)
- Douglass School (disambiguation)
- Douglass Theatre, Macon, Georgia

== See also ==
- Douglas (disambiguation)
- Douglassville, Pennsylvania
