= Rubstic =

British-bred Thoroughbred racehorse

- Sire: I Say
- Dam: Leuze
- Damsire: Vimy
- Sex: Gelding
- Foaled: 1969
- Country: United Kingdom
- Colour: Seal brown
- Owner: John Douglas
- Trainer: John Leadbetter

Major wins
- Grand National (1979)

Rubstic (1969-1995) was a British-bred Thoroughbred racehorse who competed in National Hunt racing.

Rubstic was owned by the former Scottish international rugby player John Douglas. He became the first Scottish-trained horse to win the Grand National when he won the 1979 race.

== Racing career ==
It's anybody's race as they race into the final furlong, and it's Rubstic on the nearside with the advantage over Zongalero and the weakening Rough and Tumble as they race up towards the line, it's gonna be a victory for Scotland, it's Rubstic from Zongalero in the National, and as they come to the line, Rubstic wins it..

— Commentator Peter O'Sullevan describes the climax of the 1979 National

Rubstic won the Grand National at the first time of asking in 1979 under jockey Maurice Barnes. The win was even more remarkable as it marked the National debuts for not only the horse but also for the jockey, trainer and owner.

Rubstic came into the race as the smallest horse on the card and was seen as an outsider but he ran well and despite a mistake on the second fence from which he managed to recover he pulled away from Zongalero in the final straight to win by 2 lengths. The race was heavily influenced by loose horses and only seven runners finished as the race was marred by two fatalities.

Rubstic would go on to race in the next two Nationals. He fell for the only time in his career during the 1980 Grand National at the 15th fence before returning a year later and finishing seventh in 1981.

In 1995 Rubstic died at the age of 26 in Ladykirk where he had been living in retirement under the care of his former trainer John Leadbetter.

== Grand National record ==
Grand National	Position	Jockey	Age	Weight	SP	Distance
1979	1st	Maurice Barnes	10	10-0	25/1	Won by 2 lengths
1980	DNF	Maurice Barnes	11	10-11	8/1	Fell at fence 15
1981	7th	Maurice Barnes	12	10-7	11/1	

== Pedigree ==
Pedigree of Rubstic (GB), bay gelding, 1975
Sire I Say (GB) 1962	Sayajirao (GB); 1944	Nearco (ITY)	Pharos (GB)
Sire I Say (GB) 1962	Sayajirao (GB); 1944	Nearco (ITY)	Nogara (ITY)
Sire I Say (GB) 1962	Sayajirao (GB); 1944	Rosy Legend (FRA)	Dark Legend (GB)
Sire I Say (GB) 1962	Sayajirao (GB); 1944	Rosy Legend (FRA)	Rosy Cheeks (FRA)
Sire I Say (GB) 1962	Isetta (IRE); 1943	Norland (GB)	Gainsborough (GB)
Sire I Say (GB) 1962	Isetta (IRE); 1943	Norland (GB)	Lichen (GB)
Sire I Say (GB) 1962	Isetta (IRE); 1943	Isolda (FRA)	Rustom Pasha (GB)
Sire I Say (GB) 1962	Isetta (IRE); 1943	Isolda (FRA)	Yveline (FRA)
Dam Leuze (GB) 1963	Vimy (FRA); 1952	Wild Risk (FRA)	Rialto (FRA)
Dam Leuze (GB) 1963	Vimy (FRA); 1952	Wild Risk (FRA)	Wild Violet (FRA)
Dam Leuze (GB) 1963	Vimy (FRA); 1952	Mimi (FRA)	Black Devil (USA)
Dam Leuze (GB) 1963	Vimy (FRA); 1952	Mimi (FRA)	Mignon (FRA)
Dam Leuze (GB) 1963	Over the Border; 1945	Scottish Union (GB)	Cameronian (GB)
Dam Leuze (GB) 1963	Over the Border; 1945	Scottish Union (GB)	Trustful (IRE)
Dam Leuze (GB) 1963	Over the Border; 1945	Lapel (FRA)	Apelle (ITY)
Dam Leuze (GB) 1963	Over the Border; 1945	Lapel (FRA)	Lampeto (IRE)
