= John Douglass =

John Douglass may refer to:

- John Douglass (bishop) (1743–1812), English Catholic vicar-apostolic
- John J. Douglass (1873–1939), U.S. Representative
- John Thomas Douglass (1847–1886), American composer and violinist
- John W. Douglass (born 1941), American military officer and politician
- John W. Douglass (politician), Maryland politician
- John W. Douglass (IRS Commissioner)
- John Watkinson Douglass (1827–1909), American politician
- Jack Douglass (John Patrick Douglass, born 1988), internet personality

== See also ==
- John Douglas (disambiguation)
- Jonathon Douglass, Christian musician
