= Jakub Hardie-Douglas =

Member of the Szczecinek County Council
- Incumbent
- Assumed office 2024
- In office 2014–2018

Member of the West Pomeranian Voivodeship Sejmik
- In office 2018–2024

Personal details
- Born: 1982 (age 43–44) Szczecinek, Poland
- Party: Civic Platform
- Parent: Jerzy Hardie-Douglas (father)
- Education: Adam Mickiewicz University
- Occupation: Politician; Business owner

Jakub Hardie-Douglas (born 1982; Polish: [ˈja.kup ˈxar.di ˈdaɡ.las], UK: /ˈhɑː.di ˈdʌɡ.ləs/) is a Polish politician and businessperson. He was a member of the West Pomeranian Voivodeship Sejmik from 2018 to 2024.

== Biography ==
Jakub Hardie-Douglas was born in 1982 in Szczecinek, Poland. He is Polish of Scottish descent. His ancestor moved to Ukraine from Scotland in the 19th century. His father is Jerzy Hardie-Douglas, a politician who was a member of the Sejm of Poland from 2019 to 2023, and the mayor of Szczecinek from 2006 to 2018, and again since 2024. His grandfather, Jakub Douglas (1920–1998) fought in the Warsaw Uprising during the Second World War, and his great-grandfather, James Douglas (1878–1956), was a diplomat and an activist for Polish independence.

Hardie-Douglas graduated from the Faculty of the Geographical and Geological Sciences of the Adam Mickiewicz University in Poznań, and later lived and worked in Glasgow, Scotland. After moving back to Poland, he began working in a Poznań-based advertising agency and, and later, in a German consulting firm. He eventually started his own advertising agency.

He belongs to the Civic Platform party. From 2014 to 2018 he was a member of the Szczecinek County Council, and from 2018 to 2024, a member of the West Pomeranian Voivodeship Sejmik. In 2024 he was again elected to the Szczecinek County Council.

== Controversies ==
In 2019, he was sued for defamation by Jacek Pawłowicz and was found guilty and ordered by court to pay him 10,000 Polish złoties in damages, and donate as much to a hospice in Szczecinek. Douglas-Hardie was sued after he published an article in which he accused Pawłowicz, a local political opponent and member of the rival Law and Justice party, of political corruption. He also claimed that Pawłowicz recently becoming a deputy director of a spa company in Połczyn-Zdrój was due to his party membership, and accused him of lacking sufficient qualifications. Such claims were found to be false by the court in Koszalin.
