= C. A. Douglas =

American football coach

Biographical details
- Born: December 20, 1905
- Died: June 28, 2000 (aged 94); Mobile, Alabama, U.S.

Coaching career (HC unless noted)
- 1941: Dora H.S.
- 1947–1948: Livingston State
- 1949–1950: Carbon Hill H.S.
- 1951–1968: Theodore H.S.

Head coaching record
- Overall: 3–13–1

C. A. Douglas (December 20, 1905 – June 28, 2000) was an American football coach. He served as the head football coach at the Livingston State Teachers College (now the University of West Alabama) from 1947 to 1948 and at several high schools in Alabama, most notably at Theodore High School from 1951 to 1968.

From 1946 to 1947, Douglas served as the head football coach at Livingston State. During his two seasons there, he compiled an overall record of three wins, thirteen losses and one tie (3–13–1). After his tenure at Livingston, Douglas served as head football coach at Carbon Hill High School for two seasons and compiled a record of twelve wins, seven losses and one tie (12–7–1). From Carbon Hill, he moved on to Theodore High School in 1951. During his 18-year tenure there, Douglas compiled a record of 101 wins, 58 losses and 13 ties (101–58–13). Today the stadium at Theodore is named in his honor as C. A. Douglas Field.

== Head coaching record ==
Year	Team	Overall	Conference	Standing	Bowl/playoffs
Livingston State Tigers (Alabama Intercollegiate Conference) (1947–1948)
1947	Livingston State	1–6–1			
1948	Livingston State	2–7			
Livingston State:		3–13–1			
Total:		3–13–1			
