= Lavantia Densmore Douglass =

American social reformer (1827-1899)

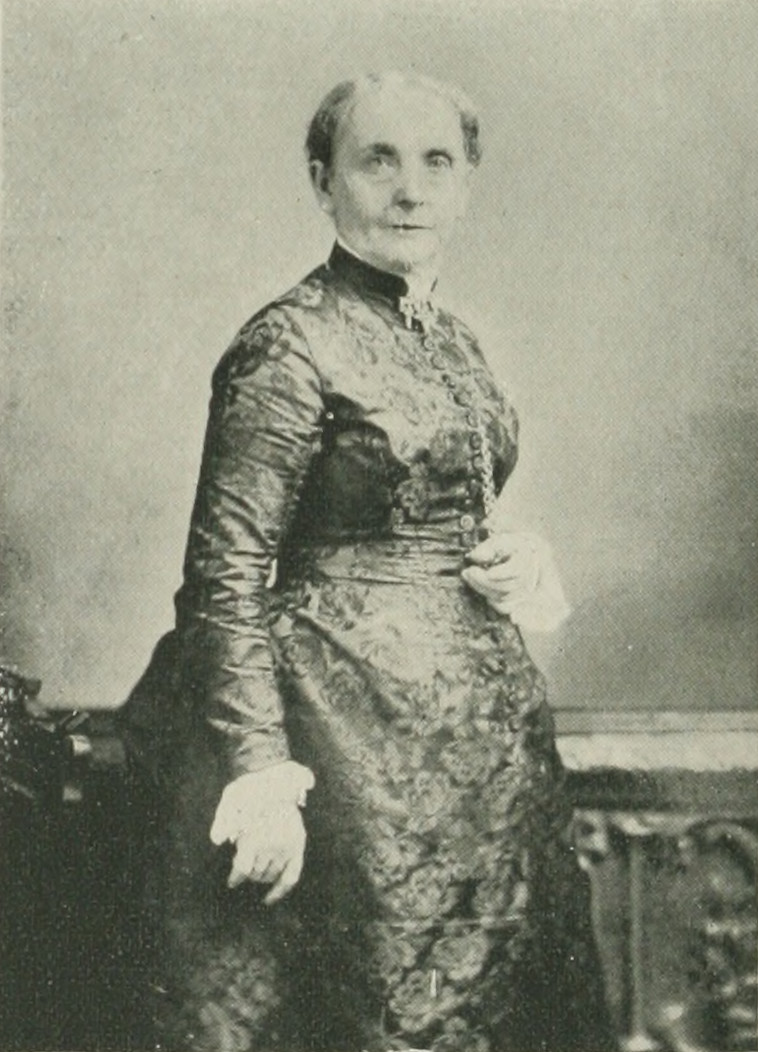
- Lavantia Densmore Douglass, "A woman of the century"
- Born: Lavantia Densmore; March 1, 1827; Rochester, New York
- Died: May 27, 1899 (aged 72); New York, New York
- Spouse: Joshua Douglass (m. 1853)

Lavantia Densmore Douglass (March 1, 1827 – May 27, 1899) was an American social reformer associated with the Woman's Christian Temperance Union (WCTU). Failing eye-sight caused by cataracts was only partially restored after surgery, and affected her efforts in the temperance cause.

== Early years ==
Lavantia Densmore was born in Rochester, New York, March 1, 1827. She was one of seven children. Her parents, Joel and Sophia Densmore, were poor. When Douglass was about nine years old, her parents removed to a farm at Crawford County, Pennsylvania. Appreciating their own lack of education, both parents strove to give their children the best educational opportunities possible, The sole luxury of their home was literature. They took the Democratic Review, almost the only magazine then published in the United States, and such papers as the National Era and the Boston Investigator. Her siblings included brothers, Emmet and William, and a sister, Elizabeth.

== Career ==
On October 4, 1853, she married Joshua Douglass (or Douglas), a young lawyer of Meadville, Pennsylvania, where she lived for the rest of her life until near the time of her death. Their children were: Marion, born February 7, 1855; Ellen, born 1858; Robert, born 1861, died 1862; Mabel, born 1864; and Gertrude, born 1866.

In Meadville, her life was devoted to caring for her household and rearing her children, as well as participating in the literary and charitable societies. In 1872, she made a visit to Europe. She arrived home from Europe on December 23, 1873, the day of the great Woman's Temperance Crusade, launched in Hillsboro, Ohio. Meadville was aroused by the great outpouring, and the following March, a mass meeting was called and a temperance organization effected. Very early on, Douglass not only identified herself with the movement, and was an active worker in the cause, but also became a member of the WCTU. For many years, she served as president of the Meadville Union. Her enthusiasm and labors made her name in her own community a synonym for temperance.

== Personal life ==
In religion, Douglass and her husband were members of the Unitarian Congregation of Meadville.

For a few years, Douglass retired from active efforts in the temperance cause, owing to failing eye-sight. Cataracts formed on both of her eyes, and though they were removed, she only regained partial vision.

In the winter of 1898–99, she had had a surgical operation for a malignant growth and had recovered almost completely from its effects, when a little more than a week before her death, she broke one of her legs. She died in Manhattan, on Saturday, May 27, 1899, at the residence of her daughter, Mrs. John Crawford Burns, Manhattan, as a result of shock after the fracture. She was buried in the family lot at Greendale Cemetery in Meadville.
