= Myra Douglas =

American writer and poet

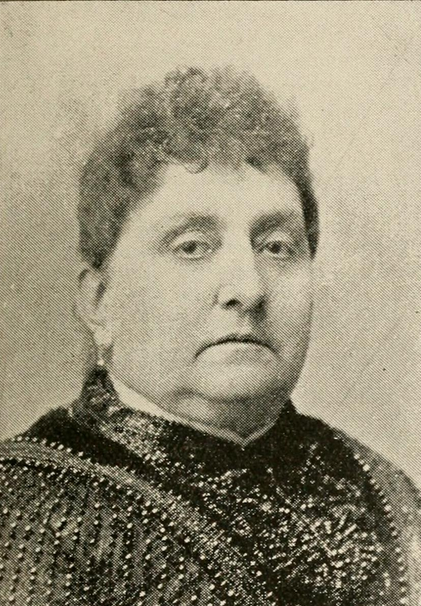
- Photo in Local and National Poets of America, 1892
- Born: c. 1844; Adrian, Michigan, U.S.
- Died: Unknown
- Occupations: Writer; poet
- Spouses: Samuel Smith; William Smith; John Gwynne
- Children: 1 daughter
- Writing career
- Genres: short stories; poetry

Myra Douglas (c. 1844–?) was an American writer and poet. Starting in her childhood, she wrote stories and verse for The Waverly Magazine and Literary Repository and Ballou magazine, both of Boston, and other prominent periodicals. Her poems were included in nearly all standard collections of American verse.

== Biography ==
Myra Douglas (sometimes spelled, "Douglass") was born in Adrian, Michigan in about 1844. Her father was John Wilkes Douglas, a medical doctor. He was one of the wealthiest men of that state. He was a physician or lawyer, and a politician. He served in the war of 1812. Her mother was of French ancestry.

Her first marriage was to Dr. Samuel Smith in West Unity, Ohio; the marriage proved unhappy and she secured a divorce. Her second marriage was to William Smith, a painter; he died three years after their marriage. Years later, she married John Gwynne, a railroad man, who also died. She had one child, a daughter.

In 1906, out of money, Douglas wrote to the St. Louis police chief, Edmund P. Creecy asking him to "find something for her to do". She had lost her home in St. Louis in a deal, pawned all of her jewelry, removed to Santa Barbara, California, and then returned to St. Louis, Missouri.

Douglas was a writer since childhood, but her stories and verses were not published until adulthood. She contributed to many periodicals, among them Waverly, Ballou, Baltimorean, Colman's Rural World, and others. She was a contributor for years to the St. Louis Critic, a weekly paper of her own city. She received letters of congratulation from Frances Cleveland, former First Lady of the United States, Mary Simmerson Cunningham Logan, Mrs. Hendricks; also Gen. P. G. T. Beauregard wrote her words of praise and thanks for some of her Poems of the South. She used her maiden name in her work, and all her contributions bore the same signature.

== Selected works ==
- Poems of the South
