= Struan Douglas =

Scotland international rugby league footballer

Personal information
- Full name: Alexander Struan Douglas
- Born: 18 September 1966 (age 58)

Playing information
Representative
Years	Team	Pld	T	G	FG	P
1995	Scotland	2	0	0	0	0

Struan Douglas (born 18 September 1966) is a Scottish Rugby league International and a partner at Coulters Property, Edinburgh.

== Family ==
Douglas' father John was a Scotland Rugby Union international, a British Lion and the owner of the Grand National winning horse Rubstic, and his grandfather was Alexander H Brown – a former president of the Scottish Rugby Union and rugby union international.
