= Robert Kennaway Douglas =

British oriental scholar

Sir Robert Kennaway Douglas (23 August 1838 – 20 May 1913) was a British oriental scholar.

== Early life ==
He was born at Larkbeare House, Talaton, Devon on 23 August 1838, the fourth son of the Rev. Philip William Douglas. His father was appointed to the Chapel of ease at Escot, Ottery St. Mary, Devon, by Sir John Kennaway, Bart. His paternal grandfather was Dr. Philip Douglas, Master of Corpus Christi College, Cambridge.

Douglas attended Blandford Grammar School.

== Career ==
Douglas was in China with the consular service, from 1858 to 1865. He then became Professor of Chinese at King's College, London.

He was vice president of the Royal Asiatic Society, and the first Keeper of the British Museum's new Department of Oriental Printed Books and Manuscripts when it was created in 1892. He was knighted in 1903 and died a decade later, on 20 May 1913.

During the 1890s Douglas collaborated on short stories with Elizabeth Thomasina Meade. He wrote articles for the Dictionary of National Biography and for the Ninth Edition (1875-1889), Tenth Edition (1902-03) and Eleventh Edition (1911) of the Encyclopædia Britannica, the latter including a long article on "China" and articles on Chinese cities ("Peking", "Nanking", "Shanghai", "Tonkin") and an article on Genghis Khan.

== Personal life ==
In August 1867 at St. Leonards, Douglas was married to Rachel Charlotte Kirkby Fenton (1842–1921), a daughter of Kirkby Fenton of Caldecott Hall, Warwickshire. Among their children were:

- Archibald Philip Douglas (1867–1953), the Deputy Director of General Ordnance in India; he married Helen Dunsterville, a daughter of Col. Knightley Dunsterville, in 1895.
- Robert Noel Douglas (1868–1957), a cricketer; he married Caroline Marie Auguste David, a daughter of Paul David of Uppingham, in 1904.
- James Douglas (1870–1958), a cricketer and headmaster of Hillside School, Godalming.
- Sholto Douglas (1873–1916), a cricketer who was killed in action during World War I.
- Stuart Monro Douglas (b. 1879), a 2nd Lieutenant with the 8th Battalion Royal Fusiliers and Headmaster of Lutterworth Grammar School; he married Hope Toulmin Smith, daughter of Toulmin Smith of The Woodlands, Dulwich Common, in 1909.
- Philip William Douglas (b. 1883), who was educated at Dulwich College Preparatory School and the Britannia.

Douglas died on 20 May 1913 and was buried at Acton Turville.

== Works ==
Douglas wrote books on China, including:

- Catalogue of Japanese Printed Books and Manuscripts in the Library of the British Museum, London: British Museum, 1898
- Catalogue of the Printed Maps, Plans, and Charts in the British Museum, London: 1885
- China, New York, P. F. Collier and Son, 1913 (The Story of Nations)
- A Chinese Manual, comprising a Condensed Grammar with Idiomatic Phrases and Dialogues, London: W. H. Allen, 1889; London: Crosby Lockwood and Son, 1904 (Text-books, Manuals, etc. in Oriental Languages)
- Chinese Stories. With Illustrations, London: W. Blackwood & Sons, 1893; reprinted in revised edition: Singapore: Graham Brash, 1990
- Confucianism and Taouism, With a Map, London: Society for Promoting Christian Knowledge, 1879 (Non-Christian Religious Systems)
- Europe and the Far East, 1506-1912 , Cambridge: University Press, 1913; New York: G. P. Putnam's Sons, 1913 (Cambridge Historical Series, ed. by G.W. Prothero)
- The Language and Literature of China (1875), Royal Institution lectures
- The Life of Jehghiz Khan Translated from the Chinese. With an Introduction, London: Trübner & Co., 1877
- Li Hungchang, London: Bliss, Sand & Foster, 1895 (Public Men of To-day)
- Society in China : Illustrated from Photographs, London: Ward, Lock, & Co., 1901
- Supplementary Catalogue of Chinese Books and Manuscripts in the British Museum, London: Longmans & Co., 1903
