= Janet Douglas (seer) =

Janet Douglas (died after 1678), was a Scottish woman who claimed to have second sight.

== Life ==
During the 1670s, in the western islands of Scotland, Janet began publicly "demonstrating" said sight by seeking out "images", objects allegedly made by witches. The phenomenon of second sight was often considered witchcraft itself.

By the time she moved to Glasgow, traveling alone at the age of eleven, she was mobbed by people wanting to discover if witchcraft was the cause of their ill luck, given word already reached the city before her arrival. After she had told several members of the crowd where they could the images, the crowd stirred itself into such a frenzy that the magistrates quickly put her under protective custody.

Soon the Privy Council of Scotland summoned her. Her arrival in Edinburgh in 1678 was as chaotic as her entrance into Glasgow — if not more so. She directly accused several members of the crowd of practising witchcraft. Judicial officials and other notables unsuccessfully interrogated her as to her background, parentage, and how she performed.

After Edinburgh, Janet's race disappeared. She was eventually released, and rumour holds that she fled to the West Indies.

=== Witchcraft and Second Sight ===
The case of Janet Douglas combines the two phenomenon of witchcraft and second sight. Janet claimed to use her skill of second sight in order to find out cases of witchcraft. The form that her 'second sight' typically took was to identify that a person's suffering was the result of an 'image' created by a witch. For example, George Hickes in his letter to Samuel Pepys in 1700 claims that Janet told a Goldsmith in Glasgow that his trade was not thriving because a witch had made an image against him.

In the later seventeenth century the relationship between second sight and witchcraft was disputed by different writers. In his letter to Pepys, Hickes clearly suggests that witchcraft was related to second sight, whereas Robert Kirk in his classic text 'The Secret Commonwealth' argues that Second Sight was an entirely innocent skill.

== Sources ==
- MacGowan, Douglas, The Enigma of Janet Douglas, Volume 13, Issue 3, Dalriada, pp. 34–36.
- Harris, R. L., "Janet Douglas and the witches of Pollock: The background of scepticism in Scotland in the 1670s,' in S. R. McKenna (ed.), Selected Essays on Scottish Language and Literature: A Festschrift in Honor of Allan H. MacLaine (Lewiston, NY, 1992).
- Hunter, Michael, The Occult Laboratory, Woodbridge: The Boydell Press (2001).
