= Glenn Douglas =

Canadian football player (1928–2017)

Profile
- Position: Offensive end

Personal information
- Born: July 1, 1928; Montreal, Quebec, Canada
- Died: April 1, 2017 (aged 88); Pembroke, Ontario, Canada

Career information
- CJFL: NDG Maple Leafs
- College: McGill University

Career history
- 1947–52: Montreal Alouettes

Awards and highlights
- Grey Cup champion (1949)

Glenn Douglas (July 1, 1928 – April 1, 2017) was a Grey Cup champion Canadian Football League player. He was an offensive end.

A graduate of both Westhill High School, Douglas played his junior football with local powerhouse NDG Maple Leafs. He joined his hometown Montreal Alouettes in 1947, in only their second season. In 1949 he was an integral part of the Larks first Grey Cup championship, and having broken his hand earlier in the season, he played the final with a cast. He attended McGill University during his playing days, graduating with a degree in physical education. He retired after 6 seasons with Montreal, playing 57 games.
