= Robert Douglas (horticulturist) =

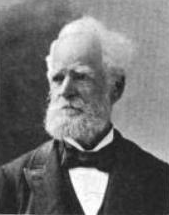
- Born: April 20, 1813; Gateshead, England
- Died: June 1, 1897 (aged 84)
- Occupation: American horticulturist

Robert Douglas (April 20, 1813 – June 1, 1897) was an English American horticulturalist. Douglas also made contributions as a forestry consultant, working with Frederick Law Olmsted on several projects, including the Biltmore Estate.

== Biography ==
Robert Douglas was born in Gateshead, England on April 20, 1813. As an adult, he emigrated to Canada in 1836, then to Vermont, United States. Douglas then settled in Little Fort, Illinois (now known as Waukegan) in 1844. Douglas enjoyed traveling and made a trip to the Pacific Ocean during the California Gold Rush via the Humboldt River route. There he found that the native Pseudotsuga menziesii was adaptable and could be cultivated in the Midwestern United States.

Douglas also identified the timber potential for the western catalpa and the hardiness of the blue spruce. He also promoted the cultivation of the European larch in the United States. Douglas was also a forestry consultant and frequently associated with landscape architect Frederick Law Olmsted. He helped Olmsted to plan the tree plantings of the Biltmore Estate. He worked on a similar project with Olmsted for Stanford University. In 1875, he co-founded the American Forestry Association. Douglas oversaw forestry operations for the Kansas City, Fort Scott and Memphis Railway in Farlington, Kansas from 1879 to 1885. The 640-acre (260 ha) farm raised catalpas; the lumber was intended to be used for cross ties. Douglas on June 1, 1897, thought to be from complications of a stroke.
