= Douglas Campbell-Douglas =

Brigadier General Douglas Campbell Douglas, C.B. (1854–1927) was a British Army officer who served with the Seaforth Highlanders and later commanded several infantry brigades during the First World War. His career spanned campaigns in India, frontier expeditions, and major Western Front operations with the 51st (Highland) Division.

== Early life and family ==
Douglas Campbell was born in 1854. He later married Violet Averil Margaret Vivian, daughter of Colonel Henry Hussey Vivian, 1st Baron Swansea. The couple had three children. In 1925, he legally adopted the surname Douglas Campbell Douglas upon inheriting the estate of his uncle, Archibald Campbell Douglas of Mains.

== Military career ==
=== Service with the Seaforth Highlanders ===
Douglas joined the Seaforth Highlanders in May 1885 and served with the 2nd Battalion in India. His early career included participation in two significant North‑West Frontier campaigns:

- Hazara Campaign (1888)
- Relief of Chitral (1895)

These operations formed part of Britain's wider frontier policy in the region.

=== Command of the 2nd Battalion ===
He commanded the 2nd Battalion, Seaforth Highlanders from 1909 to 1913, a period marked by pre‑war reforms and expansion of the British Army.

== First World War ==
=== South Wales Infantry Brigade ===
At the outbreak of the First World War, Douglas was appointed General Officer Commanding (GOC) of the South Wales Infantry Brigade.

=== Gordon Brigade ===
In February 1915, he was transferred to command the 'Gordon Brigade of the Highland Division, then stationed at Bedford. Before deployment to France, the brigade was reorganised to consist of:

- 6th Black Watch
- 7th Black Watch
- 5th Gordon Highlanders
- 7th Gordon Highlanders

Upon arrival in France, it was redesignated 153rd Infantry Brigade. Douglas commanded the brigade through major actions from Festubert (May 1915) to the capture of the Chemical Works at Roeux (April 1917).

=== 217th Infantry Brigade ===
On 5 May 1917, Douglas was transferred to command the 217th Infantry Brigade, continuing his service on the Western Front.

== Honours ==
Douglas was appointed Companion of the Order of the Bath (C.B.) in January 1917 and was 'mentioned in dispatches three times for his wartime service.

== Death ==
He died on 17 June 1927. A memorial cross commemorating him stands in New Kilpatrick Cemetery, Bearsden.
