= Robert S. Douglas =

American sailor (1932–2025)

Robert S. Douglas (March 18, 1932 – April 23, 2025) was an American sailor. He was the founder of the Black Dog restaurant on Martha's Vineyard. Douglas died on April 23, 2025, at the age of 93.
