= Mel Douglas =

Australian artist (born 1978)

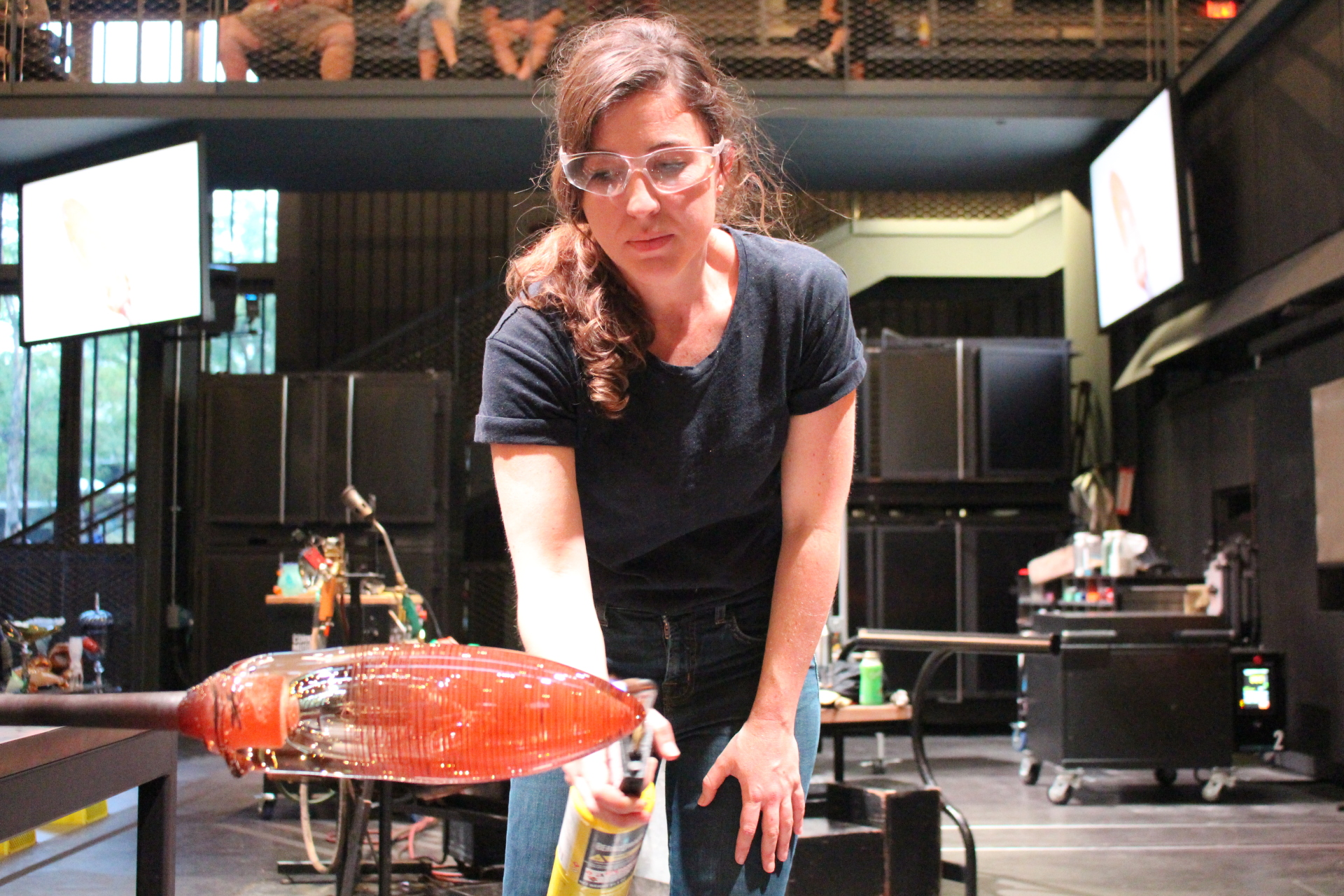
- Born: 1978 (age 47–48)
- Education: Australian National University
- Known for: Glass
- Website: meldouglasglass.com

Mel Douglas (born 1978) is an Australian glass artist living and working in her studio located in the Australian capital of Canberra.

== Biography ==
Douglas received her BA (Visual), Glass Workshop, from the Australian National University in 2000. Her surface technique consists of a slow and deliberate engraved mark making process that is in direct relation to the objects physical and linear forms . She participated in Miniature Glass 17 at the Bilk Gallery in 2017 where her work was described by The Canberra Times as "balanced." Other public collections of her work can be found in the Australian National Glass Collection in Wagga Wagga, New South Wales, Australia; the Australian National University Art Collection in Canberra, Australian Capital Territory, Australia; the Cincinnati Art Museum in Cincinnati, Ohio; and the Corning Museum of Glass in Corning, New York. Douglas's work was included in the Links: Australian Glass and the Pacific Northwest exhibition that ran from May 2013 to January 2014 at the Museum of Glass in Tacoma, Washington.

In exhibition photos, the scale of Douglas's pieces is indeterminate. They could be massive, but in real life they are practical in size. They are open and closed vessels, not always functional. The pieces are hand blown, then sanded down for hours to achieve an opaque surface that seems like velvet or suede. The next step where Douglas hand engraves lines is described by her as rhythmic and meditative.
