= Jack Douglas (footballer, born 1929) =

Australian rules footballer

Personal information
- Born: 2 June 1929
- Died: 6 February 2007 (aged 77)
- Original team: Canberra
- Height: 184 cm (6 ft 0 in)
- Weight: 80 kg (176 lb)

Playing career^{1}
Years	Club	Games (Goals)
1952–53	Hawthorn	14 (0)
- ^{1} Playing statistics correct to the end of 1953.

Jack Douglas (2 June 1929 – 6 February 2007) was an Australian rules footballer who played with Hawthorn in the Victorian Football League (VFL).
