= Abel Douglass =

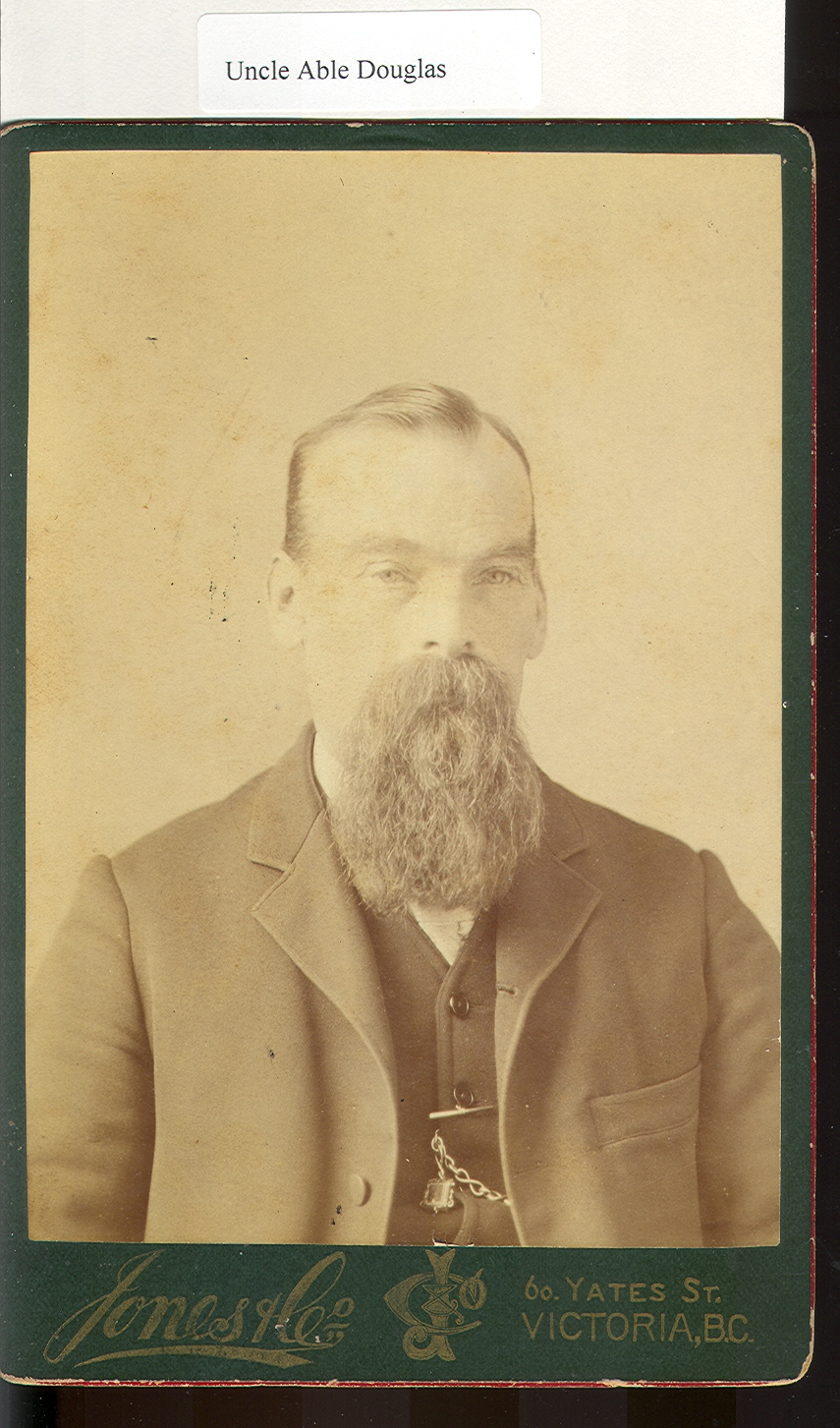
- Abel Douglass, 1890
- Born: 1841; Maine
- Died: 1908 (aged 66–67); Seattle
- Occupation: Whaler

Abel Douglass (1841–1908) was an American whaling captain.

Douglass was born in 1841 in Maine as part of a seafaring family.

== Career ==
In the 1860s, Douglass partnered with James Dawson. The Dawson and Douglass Whaling Company worked off the coast of British Columbia. The non-Native whaling industry in British Columbia began when Dawson and Douglass took eight whales from Saanich Inlet in 1868.

Dawson and Douglass founded Whaletown in 1869 as a whaling station on Cortes Island. The Whaletown operation was later moved to what is now called Whaling Station Bay on Hornby Island; the Dawson and Douglass Company merged with the Lipsett Whaling Company to form the British Columbia Whaling Company, but the company closed in 1871.

== Personal life ==
Douglass had a common-law relationship with Maria Mahoi, who was of Hawaiian and First Nations descent; they lived with their seven children on Saltspring Island. Mahoi later married George Fisher and moved to Russell Island.

== See also ==
- A Tale for the Time Being a novel by Ruth Ozeki, mentions Douglass
- History of whaling
