= Jack Douglas (footballer, born 1872) =

Australian rules footballer

Personal information
- Full name: John William Douglas
- Born: 6 November 1872; Melbourne, Victoria
- Died: 15 October 1905 (aged 32); East Melbourne, Victoria
- Original team: Cardigan

Playing career^{1}
| Years | Club | Games (Goals) |
| 1898 | Carlton | 1 (0) |
- ^{1} Playing statistics correct to the end of 1898.

John William Douglas (6 November 1872 – 15 October 1905) was an Australian rules footballer who played with Carlton in the Victorian Football League (VFL).
