= Ralph Waddell Douglass =

American cartoonist and commercial artist

- Born: December 29, 1895; St. Louis, Missouri
- Died: May 5, 1971 (aged 75); Albuquerque, New Mexico
- Education: Monmouth College, the Academy Julian in Paris, Art Institute of Chicago
- Known for: Painting, cartoon, drawing, calligraphy

Ralph Waddell Douglass (1895–1971) was an American commercial artist of national reputation and a university professor who worked as a painter, graphic artist, cartoonist, calligrapher, illustrator and designer. He is noted for his paintings of New Mexico, for his calligraphy style known as Calligraphic Lettering, and as the coauthor and illustrator of the Mesaland series of children's books.

== Biography ==
Born in St. Louis, Missouri on December 29, 1895, Douglass graduated from Monmouth College in Illinois with a Bachelor of Arts degree in 1920. As a college student he began to show promise as an artist when he won the Galloway Prize in 1915–1916. He also worked on the college newspaper, The Oracle, as a cartoonist.

He then attended the Academy Julian in Paris, The Art Institute of Chicago, and he studied under Arnold Bank at the Art Students League in New York City.

In the summer of 1920 he finished a tour of Scotland and left on the Lancaster from York, England for Egypt where he became an instructor at the American University in Cairo. He later became a staff artist and cartoonist for the Chicago Daily News.

He moved to Albuquerque, New Mexico in 1929 upon acceptance of a teaching position in calligraphy and painting at the University of New Mexico where he taught from 1929 to 1961.

His interest in football led Douglass to develop a new style of lettering for athletic jerseys that were widely licensed. As author of “Calligraphic Lettering”, his style was adopted by the National Collegiate Athletic Conference in 1956 after being published by Watson-Guptill Publications in 1948. A third edition of this book was published in 1975.

He also illustrated many children's books with coauthor Loyd Tireman including the Mesaland Series.

Douglass' paintings, especially his paintings of New Mexico were widely exhibited. His work was represented in numerous group art exhibits. He also exhibited one-man shows in Albuquerque, Santa Fe, Roswell, Clovis, Galesburg, Illinois and at Monmouth College, Western Illinois University, University of Maine and University of New Mexico. Douglass received an honorary degree, DFA from Monmouth College in 1953; the purchase prize in oil painting at the New Mexico State Fair, 1956; a purchase prize from the Ouray County Arts Association, 1964; First Prize, Grand Award and Purchase Award in painting, New Mexico State Fair, 1966.

He died in Albuquerque on May 5, 1971. His papers are archived at the Zimmerman Library at the University of New Mexico.
