= Andrew Douglas-Home =

Scottish cricketer

Personal information
- Full name: Andrew Douglas-Home
- Born: 14 May 1950 (age 76); Galashiels, Selkirkshire, Scotland
- Batting: Left-handed
- Bowling: Right-arm fast-medium
- Relatives: Lord Dunglass (uncle)

Domestic team information
- Years: Team
- 1970: Oxford University

Career statistics
Competition	First-class
Matches	4
Runs scored	33
Batting average	6.60
100s/50s	–/–
Top score	23
Balls bowled	570
Wickets	9
Bowling average	30.33
5 wickets in innings	–
10 wickets in match	–
Best bowling	3/71
Catches/stumpings	1/–
- Source: Cricinfo, 31 May 2020

Andrew Douglas-Home OBE (born 14 May 1950) is a Scottish former first-class cricketer.

The son of Edward Charles Douglas-Home and Nancy Rose Straker-Smith, he was born at Galashiels in May 1950. He was educated at Eton College, before going up to Christ Church, Oxford. While studying at Oxford, he made played first-class cricket for Oxford University in 1970, making four appearances against Hampshire, Warwickshire, Lancashire and Nottinghamshire. Playing as a right-arm fast-medium bowler, he took 9 wickets at an average of 30.33 and with best figures of 3 for 71. With the bat, he scored 33 runs with a high score of 23.

After graduating from Oxford, he became an accountant. He was made an OBE in the 2013 New Year Honours for his three decades’ service with the River Tweed Commissioners and for his role with the Abbotsford Trust, which is responsible for conserving Abbotsford House, the home of Walter Scott. His uncle, Lord Dunglass, also played first-class cricket and was Prime Minister of the United Kingdom from October 1963 to October 1964.
