= Stephen Douglas (journalist) =

British journalist

Stephen Douglas is a former British journalist for Sky News and North of England Correspondent for ITV News. He has received a BAFTA award.

He used to report for the flagship programmes ITV News at 6:30 and the ITV News at Ten.

Stephen has reported from across the UK and the world. He has made regular appearances on CNN and NBC. Stephen reported from across the UK and around the world on some of the biggest stories in the last ten years. Stephen Douglas is now a Senior Consultant at Blue Rubicon and provides specialist media training to a variety of clients. He also offers media advice across the agency’s portfolio of clients. He also worked as a media trainer at TV News London Ltd, preparing senior figures from the private and public sectors for major media appearances.

Stephen is from London.

On 24 March 2007, Douglas received the ITV Young Journalist of the Year 2007 award. In 2008 he won the Royal Television Society Award for Best Reporter North West England. In 2010 he was named as one of Broadcast magazine's 'Hotshots' - people who are young stars of broadcasting.
