= Melia Likoswe Douglas =

Malawian politician

Melia Likoswe Douglas Her Worship

Mayor of Zomba City Council
- Preceded by: Joana Ntaja
- Succeeded by: Christopher Jana

Councillor, Central Ward

Personal details
- Born: Melia Likoswe Douglas
- Party: Democratic Progressive Party

Melia Likoswe Douglas is a Malawian politician who served as the seventh Mayor of Zomba, Malawi's oldest city, between September 2015 and March 2017. She was elected to this position following the death of her predecessor, Joana Ntaja in March 2015 thus becoming the city's second female mayor. Previously, she was the Councilor for Central Ward, Zomba and affiliated to the Democratic Progress Party (DPP).

== Career ==
Douglas served as a Councilor for Central Ward in Zomba. She was elected as Councilor during the August 2015 Malawi Local Government by-elections. In the wake of her predecessor's death, Douglas was elected by fellow Zomba City Council councilors for a one and a half year mayoral term with effect from September 2015

== See also ==
- Joana Ntaja
- Juliana Kaduya
- Politics of Malawi
- Zomba
