= Andrew Douglas (Royal Navy officer) =

British Royal Navy captain

Captain Andrew Douglas
- Died: 26 June 1725
- Occupation: Royal Navy captain

Andrew Douglas (died 26 June 1725) was a British Royal Navy captain.

== Biography ==
Douglas was in 1689 master of the Phœnix of Coleraine, laden with provisions and stores for the relief of Londonderry, then besieged by the forces of James II. For some weeks a squadron of English ships had lain in Lough Foyle, unable or unwilling to attempt to force the boom with which the river was blocked, and the garrison was meantime reduced to the utmost extremity. Positive orders to make the attempt were sent to Colonel Kirke, who commanded the relieving force; and two masters of merchant ships, Browning in the Mountjoy of Derry, and Douglas in the Phœnix, volunteered for the service. With them also went Captain John Leake, in the Dartmouth frigate. As the three ships approached the boom, the wind died away; they were becalmed under the enemy's batteries, and were swept up by the tide alone. Their position was thus one of great danger; but while the Dartmouth engaged and silenced the batteries, the Mountjoy first and after her the Phœnix crashed through the boom. The Mountjoy took the ground, and for the moment seemed to be lost. She was exposed to a heavy fire, which killed Browning; but the concussion of her own guns shook her off the bank, and on a rising tide she floated up to the city. With better fortune the Phœnix had passed up without further hindrance, and brought relief to the starving inhabitants, by whom Douglas was hailed as a saviour. A certificate signed by George Walker and others, the leaders of the brave defenders of the city, recommended him to the king, and he was accordingly in February 1689–90 appointed to the command of their majesties' sloop Lark. In the following year, 30 Aug. 1691, he was posted to the Sweepstakes frigate, in which, and afterwards in the Dover, Lion, and Harwich, he served continuously during the war, employed, it would appear, on the Irish and Scotch coasts, but without any opportunity of distinction. In November 1697 the Harwich was paid off, and for the next three years Douglas was unemployed, during which time he wrote repeated letters to the admiralty, praying their lordships to take his case into consideration, as he was dependent on the navy. At last, in February 1700–1 he was appointed to the Norwich of 60 guns, which he commanded for eighteen months in the Channel, and in July 1702 sailed for the West Indies with a considerable convoy. He arrived at Port Royal of Jamaica in September, where for the next eighteen months he remained senior officer, and in July 1704 sailed for England with a large convoy. He arrived in the Thames in the end of September, and while preparing to pay off wrote on 4 Oct.: ‘Understanding that the Plymouth is near ready to be launched, I should gladly desire to be, together with my officers and men, removed into her, if his royal highness thinketh fit.’ The letter is curious; for almost while he was writing many of his officers and men were combining to try him by court-martial on charges of suttling, trading, hiring out the men to merchant ships for his private advantage, and of punishing them ‘exorbitantly.’ On such charges he was tried at Deptford on 16 Nov., and the court holding them to be fully proved, ‘in consideration of the meanness of his proceedings,’ sentenced him to be cashiered (Minutes of Court-martial). Five years afterwards, on 24 Sept. 1709, the Earl of Pembroke, then lord high admiral, on the consideration of fresh evidence, reinstated him in his rank (Home Office Records (Admiralty), xix. 184), and in March 1710–11 he was appointed to command the Arundel, in which he was employed in the North Sea, and stretching as far as Gottenburg with convoy. While in her, on 15 Dec. 1712, he was again tried by court-martial for using indecent language to his officers, and confining some of them to their cabins undeservedly, and for these offences he was fined three months' pay. He seems indeed to have been guilty, but under great provocation, more especially from the lieutenant, who was at the same time fined six months' pay. In the following March the Arundel was paid off, and in February 1714–15 Douglas was appointed to the Flamborough, also on the home station. She was paid off in October, and he had no further service, but after several years on half-pay as a captain, died 26 June 1725.

Of his family we know but little. He had with him in the Norwich and afterwards in the Arundel a youngster, by name Gallant Rose, whom he speaks of as his wife's brother, ‘whose father was captain in the army in Cromwell's time.’ He also on different occasions applied for leave to go to the north of Ireland on his own affairs, which fact would seem to imply that, notwithstanding his Scotch-sounding name, he was an Ulster Irishman.
