= Jerzy Hardie-Douglas =

Polish politician (born 1951)

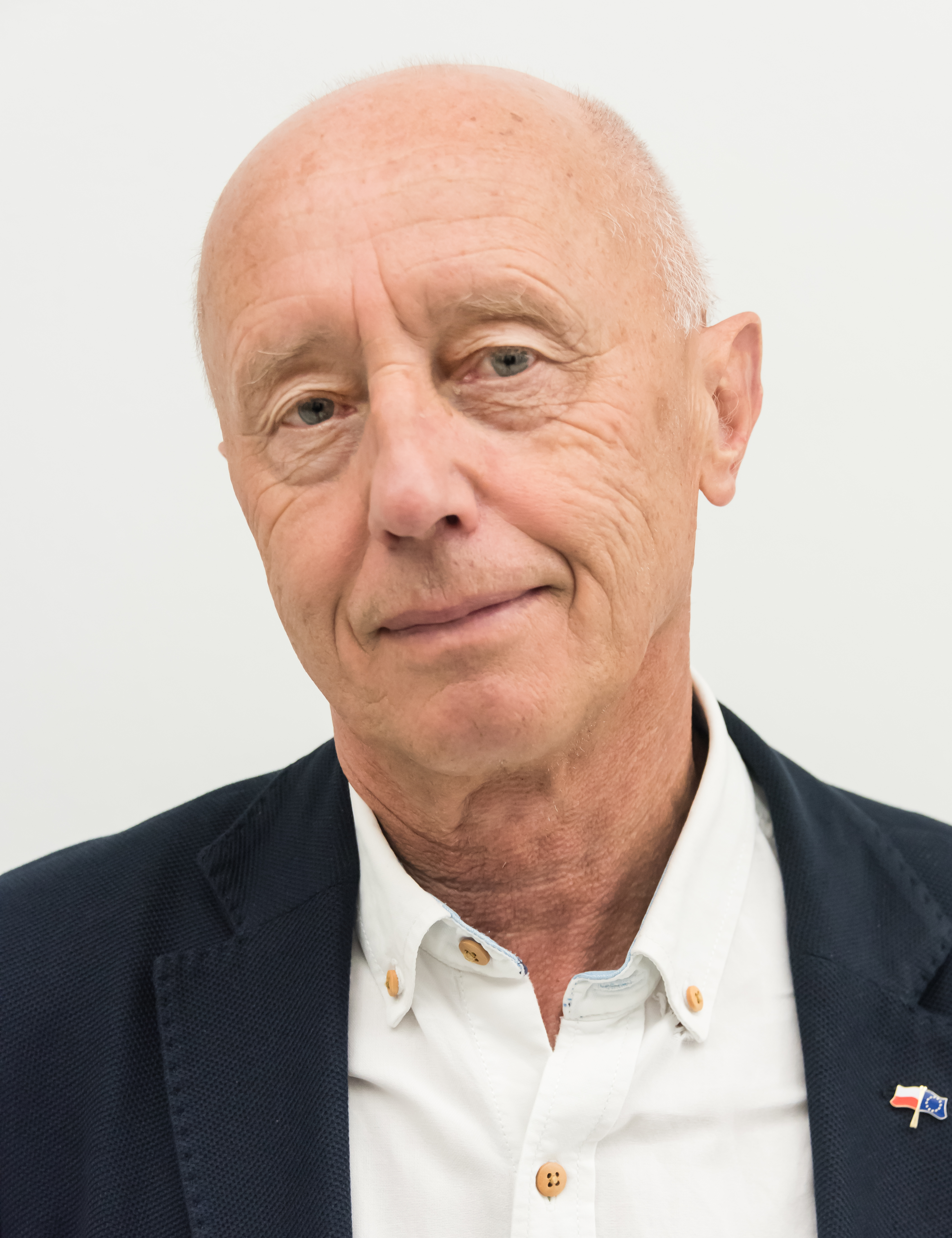
- Jerzy Hardie-Douglas in 2022.

Mayor of Szczecinek
- Incumbent
- Assumed office 6 May 2024
- Preceded by: Daniel Rak
- In office 1 January 2006 – 21 November 2018
- Preceded by: Marian Goliński
- Succeeded by: Daniel Rak

Member of the Sejm of Poland
- In office 12 November 2018 – 12 November 2023

Member of the Szczecinek County Council
- In office 2018–2024

Member of the Szczecinek City Council
- In office 2002–2006
- In office 1990–1998

Personal details
- Born: 1 February 1951 (age 75) Łódź, Poland
- Party: Independent (2024–present); Civic Platform (2001–2024); Democratic Union (before 2001); Movement of the Hundred (before 2001)
- Children: Jakub Hardie-Douglas
- Education: Medical University of Łódź
- Occupation: Politician; Surgeon

Jerzy Hardie-Douglas (born 1 February 1951; Polish: [ˈjɛ.ʐɘ̟ ˈxar.di ˈdaɡ.las], English: /hɑː.di dʌɡ.ləs/) is a politician and surgeon. Since 2024, he is the mayor of Szczecinek, Poland, previously also holding the office between 2006 and 2018. From 2018 to 2023, he was also a member of the Sejm of Poland.

== Biography ==
Jerzy Hardie-Douglas was born on 1 February 1951 in Łódź, Poland. He is Polish of Scottish descent. His ancestor moved to Ukraine from Scotland in the 19th century. His father, Jakub Douglas (1920–1998) fought in the Warsaw Uprising during the Second World War, and his grandfather, James Douglas (1878–1956), was a diplomat and an activist for Polish independence.

After graduating from highschool, he began working in the emergency medical services in Łódź, and as a hospital nurse in Zgierz. From 1970 to 1972 he studied at the Medical University of Gdańsk, and in 1976, he has graduated from the Medical University of Łódź. He has specialised in medicine, general and oncological surgery. In 1976 he began working in a hospital in Szczecinek, from 1985 to 1992, he was a director of the city emergency medical services, and from 1992 to 2002, a medical director of the ward of general surgery. Later he worked in a private clinic, and a military clinic.

In 1980, he organised structures of the Solidarity trade union at his workplace, and in 1989, a Szczecinek division of the Solidarity Citizens' Committee. From 1990 to 1998 and from 2002 to 2006, he was a member of the Szczecinek City Council, and from 1990 to 1991, he was a deputy mayor. He was a member of the Democratic Union and the Movement of the Hundred, and in 2001 he joined the Civic Platform, and was a chairperson of its division in the Szczecinek County. He unsuccessfully run for office of member of the Sejm of Poland on the 2001 parliamentary election.

In 2005 he was elected as the mayor of Szczecinek, being in office from 1 January 2006 to 21 November 2018. He was reelected in 2006, 2010, and 2014, and did not run in 2018. Instead, that year he was elected to the Szczecinek County Council.

In 2019, he was elected as a member of the Sejm of Poland, and remained in office until the end of his term in 2023, not running for a reelection.

In February 2024, he was removed from the Civic Platform, after he announced his race for office for the mayor of Szczecinek, against the party's candidate. He won, beginning his term on 6 May 2024.

== Private life ==
His son, Jakub Hardie-Douglas (born 1982) is also a politician, who from 2018 to 2024 was a member of the West Pomeranian Voivodeship Sejmik.
