= Walter Douglas =

Scottish crime figure

Walter Douglas (born 1961) is an alleged Scottish drug trafficker and organised crime figure, dubbed the Tartan Pimpernel by the press, who is reportedly one of the richest in the United Kingdom with an estimated worth of £20 million. He was allegedly wanted in at least three countries on drug trafficking and gun running charges as of 2003, and Douglas was reported to have had ties to numerous international criminal organisations in Europe and North America as the head of the Delta crime syndicate. But in fact nothing has ever been proved against Douglas. In October 2013 there were no longer any warrants out against him and he staunchly maintained his innocence to a British journalist

== Early life ==
Born in Glasgow, Scotland, Douglas was allegedly a former milkman and petty thief before it was reported that he became involved in drug trafficking and money laundering with the Delta crime syndicate during the 1980s and early 1990s earning millions smuggling cannabis into the United Kingdom from Morocco, Spain and the Netherlands. An associate of Brian Doran, he was said to have used a plants and car exporting business as a front for his activities, it was reported. He was also questioned by police in the 1990 murder of Charlie Wilson, a member of the Great Train Robbery. He was cleared of any involvement after proving he was in Tenerife at the time. While many reports were carried in the Scottish press nothing was ever proven against him and he now lives in Thailand. He admitting known well known crime figures in Marbella but told a journalist it was difficult not to, but in fact he was a businessman and had interests in Dreamers nightclub in Marbella and Dreamers Beach Club in Koh Samui. International agencies confirmed at the same time that there were no outstanding warrants against him.

Walter Douglas, now living under the name Bobby Brown, but travelling happily under his real passport, insisted that the press had embellished and even made up his career as a narcotics trafficker. He cited reports in the Sunday Mail and Sunday People suggesting he was laughing at police stating that they were simply not true. He had never had any convictions as such.

== Arrest in the Netherlands ==
In early 1994, he and his three partners were arrested by Dutch authorities after a freighter, the Britannia Gezel, was boarded by British customs officers who discovered over 18 tons of hashish on board. One of the largest narcotics investigations in the history of the Netherlands, which included the Dutch Interregionaal Recherche Team (IRT), the British Customs Service and the American Drug Enforcement Administration, the reported street value of the seized cannabis was estimated at £60 million.

Arrested by Dutch police at his farmhouse at Abcoude, he and his three alleged partners were tried at Utrecht High Court and accused of smuggling cannabis, ecstasy and cocaine. Douglas was also scheduled to be tried in Scotland, the Crown Office in Edinburgh filing for extradition only hours of his arrest. With testimony by agents from the Netherlands, Denmark, Spain and the United States, the prosecution accused Douglas and the others of earning 100 million from drug trafficking operations during the last three years. Douglas was eventually sentenced to four years imprisonment and fined 250,000 on 29 March 1994.

His lawyer appealed the case claiming Dutch police used illegal phone taps to make the arrest and he was acquitted after serving six months in custody on remand and another three months while awaiting his appeal.

== On the run ==
Douglas was soon discovered by authorities living in southern Spain's Costa del Crime under the name Terence Tomkins within several years. Spanish custom officials made several failed attempts to take him into custody following a two-year international sting operation when they raided the wrong house in Fuengirola. Two years later, in May 1998, Douglas was taken into custody by police on suspicion of laundering an estimated £150 million, he was imprisoned in the notorious Alhaurin de le Torre prison in Málaga, Spain. However, he was eventually released after acquittal in court due to insufficient evidence. Attempt at extradition apparently failed.

In 2003, he was placed in Russia working with the Russian Mafia. There was however little substance to these allegations. In early 2005, he it was reported that he went to South Africa with £4 million after a failed drug deal with the Russian mobsters in Latvia. During this time, it was reported, he hired two Latvian bodyguards believing Colombian drug cartels might also pursuing him. In July 2005, he purchased a 75 ft.-Sunseeker Predator and made his escape from the country reportedly sailing north for Spain. Worth £1.5 million, the yacht was fitted with high-tech radar and twin 1,200 hp engines keeping ahead of the Russian Mafia and Colombian drug cartels.

He however has denied all these reports saying he took a flight to Spain from South Africa as most people would do. Newspapers he said embellished stories about him and mixed him up with other people so much that people found it difficult to understand fact from fiction. "I am totally clean. Nobody wants me for anything" he told a journalist

== Recent years ==
At this time Walter Douglas continued to evade the law, using multiple aliases to stay ahead of his pursuers, the Included, "Wattie Douglas", William Baird McDonald, also the alias under which we was arrested in Spain, Terence Tompkins and Bobby Brown, the alias he used following his Spain arrest and the one he used to get into South Africa and later Thailand. The Free Library reported on the story, Here

Written by Dreamers "own hand" on their Facebook page, Dreamers Thailand, followed two previous Dreamers clubs, one in Marbella Spain and a second on the Island of Ibizi, moving between the two, a transit that ultimately resulted in his arrest . It is believed that the opening of beach clubs was the perfect front for laundering his drug money with his top aid and muscle, Sean O'Neil.

In September 2006, he was caught while attempting to enter Ibiza using a false passport. This was reported on by a number news outlets, even The Douglas Archives.

Arrested by a warrant issued by a judge in Marbella, Spain, Douglas was detained for further questioning by authorities. As he had purchased the passport in the Netherlands, the charges against him were dropped and Douglas was eventually released. He did remain out on bail in regards to money laundering charges agreeing to report to the court on a regular basis and was eventually acquitted.

Douglas then fled to South Africa, arriving in and around the last quarter of 2006 with 2 Latvian bodyguards, using the name Bobby Brown and set up shop in Cape Town. Douglas moved freely from South Africa to a number of destinations but always returning to Cape Town, where by now Douglas and his associates were becoming part of the Cape Town underworld. In 2010, Douglas was eventually placed on a no fly list to South Africa and fled to Thailand.

In Thailand, Douglas went into business with long time friend John Mundy, opening Dreamers night club. The Mirror caught up with him -->https://www.mirror.co.uk/news/world-news/tartan-pimpernel-walter-douglas-taunts-2343200. Hot on their hills was the Daily Record --> https://www.dailyrecord.co.uk/news/scottish-news/sunday-mail-finds-former-drugs-2343693

By this time, Douglas and Sean O'Neil had attracted the attention of both Scotland yard and Interpol. Investigations continued through 2013 where a "gangsters tea party", made up of Walter Douglas aka Bobby Brown, Sean O'Neil and Michael O'Neil was surveilled in Thailand. It was soon to come to a head in 2014.

Walter Douglas aka Bobby Brown and Michael O'Neil were arrested on 5 February 2014, Douglas in Thailand by Interpol and the Thai police, and O'Neil being arrested in the U.K. Douglas was extradited back to the U.K.
