= Richard Douglass =

American soldier, deacon, and a politician (1746–1828)

Captain Richard Douglass (1746–1828) was an American cooper, soldier, deacon, and a politician. He was born in New London, Connecticut, in 1746 and was the son of Stephen and Patience Douglass. He ran a successful business as a cooper. In 1760, there were already more than 40 ships from brigs to sloops registered in New London. Many of them were under the Shaw Family flag conducting business in the East and West Indies, as well as foreign ports in Lisbon, Barcelona, Amsterdam, England and Russia. Coopering was a valuable trade, especially with New London and the Colonies' increasing demand for Bajan (Barbados) rum.

== Cousin ==
Richard had a cousin of the same name, the Revolutionary War, Captain Richard Douglass, the younger (1750-1816), who was a member of the Society of the Cincinnati. Both men were buried in Cedar Grove Cemetery in New London, Connecticut. Incorrect older applications of the Daughters of the American Revolution (DAR) and Sons of the American Revolution (SAR) have misconstrued the service between the two Richards. There is no conclusive information in the service records of either, as both spent time in the same units.

== American Revolution ==
Douglass enlisted in 1775 when the outbreaks of hostilities against Britain began and served with distinction throughout the war, ending his service in 1783. He joined William Coit's Independent Company and marched to Boston alongside Nathan Hale, William Coit, John and James Chapman, and other New Londoners. It is still unknown if his unit, under the command of Captain Chapman, participated at the Battle of Bunker Hill, but it is suspected that William Coit and his 200 man unit fought alongside Thomas Knowlton of Connecticut. Chapman eventually served under Knowlton in the elite Army Ranger unit.

Two companies of New London County men were at Bunker Hill, including John Tubbs of modern-day East Lyme and Christopher Darrow (East Lyme/Montville), then called "Northern Parrish". Current documents show that it is likely that William Coit's Independent Company protected the retreating soldiers from Bunker Hill (Breeds), countered any British engagements, and allowed the survivors to return safety.

It is known that Chapman's Regiment of Foote or "Company" served under Lyme's General Samuel Holden Parsons, then living in New London, and participated at the Battle of Long Island, the defense of New York City, and the eventual retreat to the Highlands. It is thought that Douglass "suffered atrocities of the British" and was held prisoner until eventually escaping a prison ship in 1776 or 1777. It is also possible that as their poorly-led unit was outflanked, he was taken to prison at Germantown, as many from New London County were.

Douglass fought at the defense of Philadelphia, Monmouth, New Jersey, Germantown, and Brandywine engagements along with many other Eastern Connecticut men

Douglass served throughout the war and was the victim of atrocities when Benedict Arnold returned in 1781. Arnold was responsible for the burning of New London and the attack on Fort Griswold in Groton, events that eventually claimed the lives of 83 men on the Groton side and six on the New London side. While Bradley Street was left untouched, it is possible that Douglass and his family suffered harassment.

He served as a church deacon in the Methodist Church. The Methodist Church in New London was first organized at Richard Douglass´ House in 1793. In later years, Douglass was active as a cooper and baker from his property on Green Street.

== Military history ==
The service is cited for Richard Douglas (b. 1750, d. 1816) ref. p. 149-150, Douglas, Charles Henry James, Douglas Family Records (1879), and not the subject of this article.(Provided by the Society of the Cincinnati)

Douglas, Richard (Conn). Private in the Lexington Alarm, April 1775; Ensign and Regimental Quartermaster in Selden's Connecticut State Regiment, 20 June to 25 December 1776; 2nd Lieutenant 1st Connecticut, 1 January, 1777; 1st Lieutenant, 1 January 1778; Captain Lieutenant, 11 August, 1780; Captain, 22 August 1780; transferred to 5th onnecticut, 1 January 1781, transferred to 3d Connecticut, 1 January 1783; transferred to Swift's Consolidated Connecticut Regiment, June, 1783, and served to 3d November, 1783. (Died 1828.)

There is some confusion as to which Richard Douglass served whereas both served during the war. Richard Douglass, with two "s" in his name, is listed throughout the historical documents in the national and state archives. Richard Douglas, with one "s" is also listed, and in some cases, they served in the same units. The second Douglas (one "s") is also listed as "2nd" or second as they were four years younger than the senior two "s" Douglass.

At the end of the war, with New London nearly burned to the ground and its economy in shambles, it appears Richard Douglass's business began to rebound slowly. Just a few years after the war ended, he purchased land from Timothy Green at the corners of the new Golden Street and Cross Street (now Green's Alley) to build a house. At nearly 40 years of age, he moved from Bradley Street, which was known as "Widows Row" from the British attack on New London to a new street even closer to the wharves on Bank Street. He conducted his cooperage at 102 Golden Street for some time, and eventually purchased the plot at 77–79 Green Street (immediately next door) for $117 on June 30, 1801. Douglass purchased the property from Timothy Green, then living in Fredericksburg, Virginia, to manage his family business interests. The house was built a short time after and is one of the few homes of its type remaining in New London.

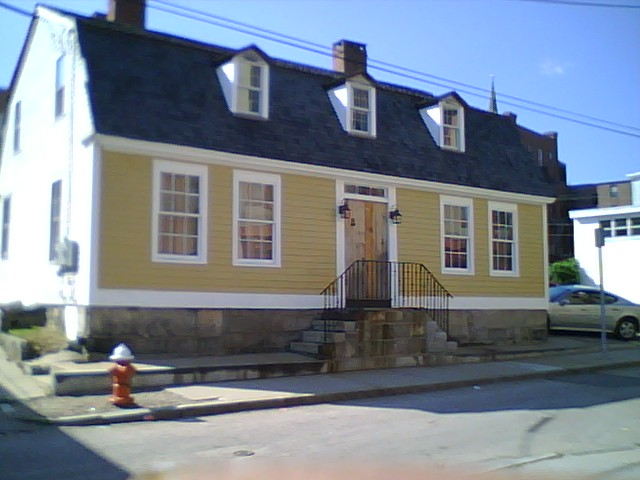
Richard Douglass House

At the close of the American Revolution in 1783, Richard became one of the founding officers of the Society of the Cincinnati and it is noted in Bryce Metcalf's Original Members and Other Officers Eligible to the Society of the Cincinnati (1938) that he served until November 3, 1783. Richard Douglass was a member of the Connecticut Society.

== Family ==
Richard married Anna Champlin Jennings (1751–1801), a widow from New Shoreham, Block Island, Rhode Island, in 1777; they had eight children.

Richard Douglass' children were Alexander Douglass (1778–1857), Nancy Douglass (1780–1861), larissa Douglass (1781–1824), Fanny Douglass Miner (1784–1855), Richard Douglass (1785–1852), Luke Douglass (1788–1820), Charles Douglass (1792–1851), and Peter Douglass (1796–1874).

Alexander eventually became a whaling captain and worked for Benjamin Brown a New London firm as well as for the Williams firm. He purchased a property in upstate New York, or received it from a war grant for his father's service in the war, and eventually retired there after his last whaling voyages at around 1838. The Benjamin Brown house (ca. 1817) still stands today on Bank Street as a "granite" icon to the Whaling Era. Alexander was the captain of many of the most successful early whaling voyages out of New London.

Richard Jr. became a lawyer and moved to Ohio Territory at Chillicothe, then being populated by many of Eastern Connecticut's citizens. He relocated to Marietta, Ohio, and had two sons, Luke Richard and Albert. Richard Sr. died in 1852 in Chillicothe, Ohio.
