= Andrew Douglas (physician) =

Scottish physician

- Born: 1736; Teviotdale, Roxburghshire
- Died: 10 June 1806 (aged 69–70); Buxton
- Occupation: Physician

Andrew Douglas (1736 – 10 June 1806) was a Scottish physician.

== Biography ==
Douglas was born in Teviotdale, Roxburghshire, in 1736, and educated at the university of Edinburgh. He began professional work as a surgeon in the navy in 1756, but returned to Edinburgh in 1775 and graduated M.D. He settled in London with the intention of practising midwifery, and was admitted a licentiate of the Royal College of Physicians on 30 September 1776. He published ‘De Variolæ Insitione,’ Edinburgh, 1775; ‘Observations on an Extraordinary Case of Ruptured Uterus,’ London, 1785, and in 1789 ‘Observations on the Rupture of the Gravid Uterus.’ He grew rich by marriage, gave up practice, and travelled abroad with his wife from 1792 to 1796. In 1800 he left London for his native country, and settled in a country house which he had bought near Kelso. He died at Buxton 10 June 1806.
