= Laura Douglas (artist) =

American painter and muralist

Laura Glenn Douglas
- Laura Glenn Douglas, New Deal artist
- Born: 1896; Winnsboro, South Carolina
- Died: 1962 (aged 75–76)
- Known for: Painting, Muralist

Laura Glenn Douglas (1896–1962) was an American painter and muralist born in Winnsboro, South Carolina.

== Education ==
She attended Columbia College in Columbia, South Carolina before moving to Washington D.C. where she enrolled in the Corcoran College of Art and Design. From there she went to the Art Students League in New York City where she studied with George Bridgman and at the National Academy of Desigh with Charles Webster Hawthorne. She then moved to Paris where she studied with Fernand Léger and André Lhote and to Munich where she studied under Hans Hoffman. After close to a decade in Europe she returned to the United States in 1935.

== Mural ==
In 1942 she painted a mural in the US Post Office in Camilla, Georgia, entitled Theme of the South. The mural was funded by the Treasury Section of Fine Arts, a program created under President Franklin Roosevelt's New Deal to provide work to artists and embellish public buildings.

== The South ==
Later in life she returned to South Carolina and following that move the state and its people became the major theme in her work. She stated, "the South has been sung in song, literature, prose, and poetry, but the portrayal of the South in painting has not been successfully done as yet. I seek to put the poetry and history of the South in paint, but with vigor and creativeness and not sentimentalism."
