= Robert Noel Douglas =

English cricketer, teacher, and priest

Robert Noel Douglas (Norwood Green, Middlesex 9 November 1868 – Colyton, Devon 27 February 1957) was an English first-class cricketer, teacher and priest.

== Early life ==
He was the second son of Sir Robert Kennaway Douglas (1838–1913) and Rachel Charlotte Kirkby Fenton (1842–1921).

He was educated at Dulwich and Selwyn College, Cambridge. He represented Cambridge University (three blues), Surrey and Middlesex as a right-handed batsman. His brothers A.P., James and Sholto also played first-class cricket.

== Career ==
In 1888 he was appointed Assistant Master at Dulwich College Preparatory School; then at Uppingham School, 1892; and House Master there, 1904. Head Master of Giggleswick School, 1910–31. He left teaching and was ordained deacon in Exeter in 1931; and priest in 1932 appointed curate of Farway with Northleigh and Southleigh, Devon from 1931 to 1936; and Rector there from 1936.

== Personal life and death ==
In 1904 married Caroline Marie Augusta David (1871–1923), daughter of (Peter Julius) Paul David (1841–1932), the Director of Music at Uppingham School.

Douglas died in February 1957 of unknown causes in Coylton, Devon.
