= John Primrose Douglas =

Honorary Surgeon to the Queen

Major-General John Primrose Douglas CB OBE (22 February 1908 – 4 September 1975), was Honorary Surgeon to the Queen.

Commissioned a Lieutenant in the R.A.M.C. in April 1933, his first posting overseas was to Gibraltar, 1934–39, during the time of the Spanish Civil War. In May/June 1937 he assisted in treating two batches of naval casualties which were evacuated to the Military Hospital - one batch was from the German armoured ship Deutschland that had been attacked by Spanish Republican aircraft, and which had made for Gibraltar as the nearest specialist treatment centre. For his work with both casualty groups, Captain Douglas was awarded the M.B.E. (1938 Birthday Honours) and the German Red Cross Order.

His administrative work during World War 2 with the allies brought him a clutch of awards from the US, Czechoslovakia, Netherlands and Belgium, including Knight Commander of the Oranje Order Nassau with Swords (15 October 1945), and in addition he was awarded the O.B.E.

Promoted to Brigadier in May 1961, he was advanced to Major-General in August 1965. In 1965 he was appointed Honorary Surgeon to the Queen and in 1968 was awarded the C.B.
