= James Douglas (cricketer) =

English cricketer

James Douglas (Northwood Green, Middlesex 8 January 1870 – Cheltenham, Gloucestershire 8 February 1958) was an English first-class cricketer.

Douglas was educated at Dulwich and Selwyn College, Cambridge. He was a right-handed batsman and a slow left-arm bowler for Cambridge University (three blues) and Middlesex.

He came from a cricketing family. His brothers A.P., Robert and Sholto also played first-class cricket.
