= James Douglas (1878–1956) =

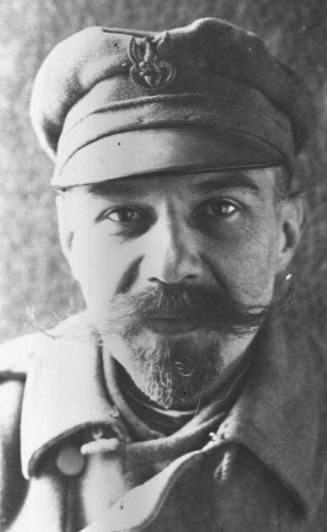
- James Douglas in 1918

Consul of Poland in Harbin, China
- In office 1 October 1931 – 30 April 1933
- Preceded by: Edward Skowroński
- Succeeded by: Aleksander Kwiatkowski

Personal details
- Born: 7 September 1878 Russian Empire (now located in Ukraine)
- Died: 4 December 1956 (aged 78)
- Party: Polish Socialist Party
- Relatives: Jerzy Hardie-Douglas (grandson)
- Occupation: Diplomat

Military service
- Allegiance: Austria-Hungary
- Branch/service: Polish Legions
- Years of service: 1914–1918
- Unit: 1st Artillery Regiment
- Battles/wars: First World War

James Douglas (7 September 1878 – 4 December 1956) was a diplomat and Polish independence activist.

== Biography ==
James Douglas was born on 7 September 1878 in the Russian Empire, within the area of modern Ukraine. He was Polish of Scottish descent. His ancestor moved from Scotland to Ukraine in the 19th century to open there a sugar mill.

Douglas graduated from a gymnasium (middle school) in Kyiv. He was an activist for Polish independence, and a member of the Polish Socialist Party. In 1904 he was a foreign correspondent of Lviv-based newspaper Słowo Polskie, sent to Japan. There, together with Józef Piłsudski and Tytus Filipowicz, he was also a member of a diplomatic mission by the Polish Socialist Party. During the First World War, from 1914 to 1918, he served in the 1st Artillery Regiment of the Polish Legions of Austria-Hungary. During the interwar period he worked in the diplomatic service of Poland, including being a consul in Harbin, China from 1931 to 1933.

He died on 4 December 1956.

His son, Jakub Douglas (1920–1998) fought in the Warsaw Uprising during the Second World War, and his grandson, Jerzy Hardie-Douglas (born 1951) is a politician, who was a member of the Sejm of Poland from 2019 to 2023.

== Awards and decorations ==
- Cross of Independence (1931)
- Double Cross of Valour
- Gold Cross of Merit (1939)
