= John Douglas (rugby union) =

Scottish rugby player (1934–2025)

- Born: John Douglas; 18 December 1934; Woolwich, London, England
- Died: 5 January 2025 (aged 90); England
- Education: Stewart's Melville College
- Children: Two, including Struan

Rugby union career
- Position: Fullback
Amateur team(s)
Years	Team	Apps	(Points)
- Blackheath FC
–	Stewart's Melville RFC		
International career
Years	Team	Apps	(Points)
1961-63	Scotland	12	
1962	British and Irish Lions		
1961-65	Barbarians		

John Douglas (18 December 1934 – 5 January 2025) was a Scottish international rugby player.

== Biography ==
Douglas was educated at Stewart's Melville College in Edinburgh and first played rugby for the school XV. During his National Service he played for the B.A.O.R and when back in civilian life played for Blackheath. He returned to Scotland and played for Stewart's Melville Former Pupils RFC and Edinburgh before his first cap for Scotland in 1961. He was capped twelve times as No 8 for Scotland between 1961 and 1963.

He took part in the 1962 British Lions tour to South Africa, although not selected for any test appearances, and also for the Barbarians tours of 1961 and 1965. He was a successful Rugby Sevens player.

In later life he became a racehorse owner. His horse Rubstic won the 1979 Grand National.

His elder son Struan Douglas is a Scottish rugby league international and his younger son Nigel Douglas played rugby for Scottish School boys, premier rugby for Dundee HSRFP and district rugby for North and Midlands.

Douglas died from complications of a stroke on 5 January 2025, at the age of 90.

== Sources ==
- ESPN Scrum - England/Players and Officials/John Douglas
- Stewart's Melville FP - J.Douglas
