= Douglass Place =

Historic house in Maryland, United States

- U.S. National Register of Historic Places
- Baltimore City Landmark
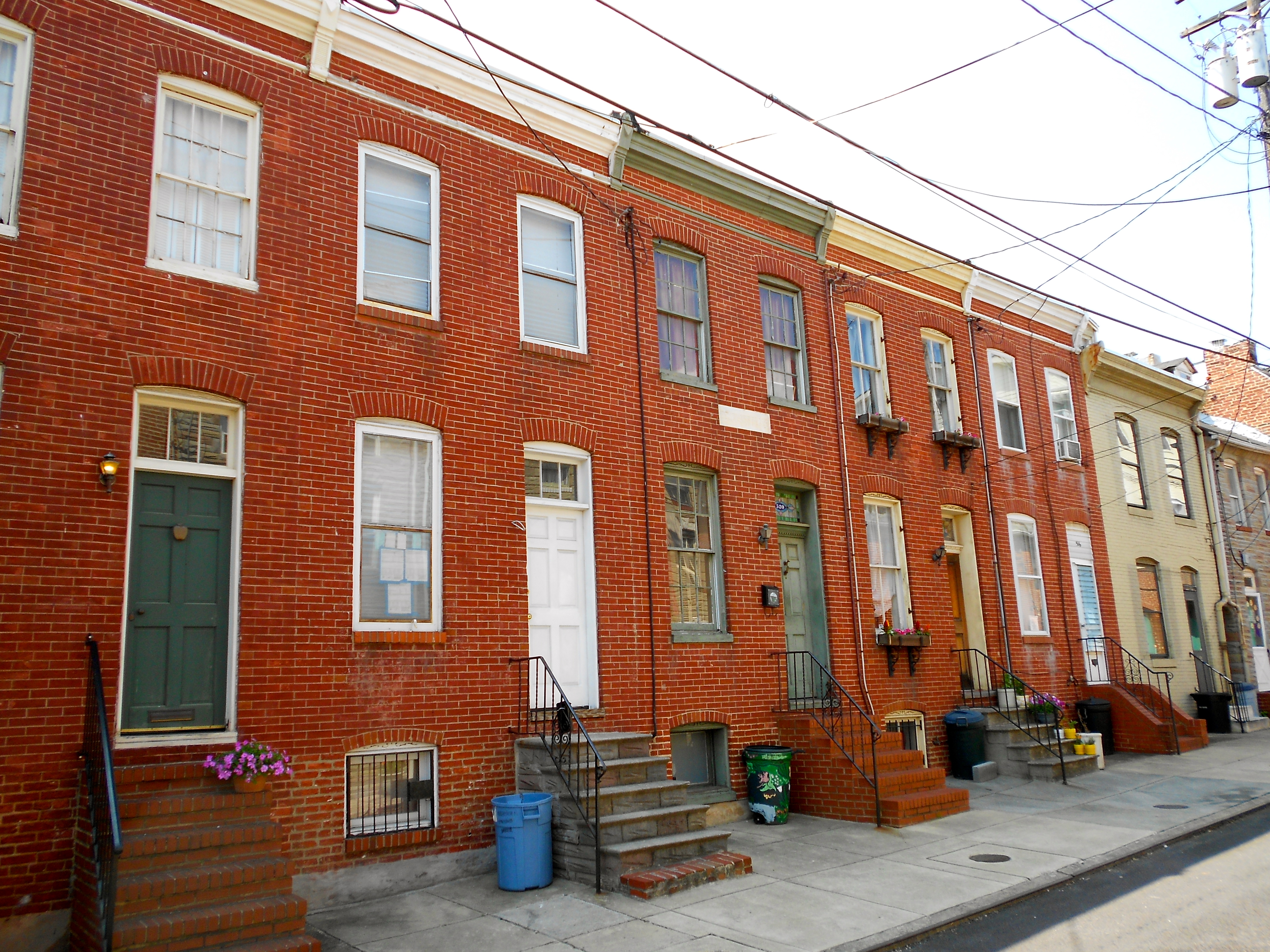
- Douglass Place, May 2012
- Interactive map of Douglass Place
- Location: 516-524 S. Dallas St., Baltimore, Maryland
- Coordinates: 39°17′6″N 76°35′47″W
- Area: less than one acre
- Built: 1892
- Architectural style: Italianate
- NRHP reference No.: 83004214

Significant dates
- Added to NRHP: September 15, 1983
- Designated BCL: 2003

Douglass Place is a group of historic rowhouses located at Baltimore, Maryland, United States. Built in 1892, it represents typical "alley houses" of the period in Baltimore, two narrow bays wide, two stories high over a cellar, with shed roofs pitched to the rear. Italianate influence is reflected in their segmental-arched window and door openings, and in the simple molded sheet metal cornices which crown the buildings. Frederick Douglass (1818-1895) constructed the five buildings as rental housing for blacks in the Fells Point area of Baltimore, where he had resided from the 1820s to 1838. The site was the location of the Dallas Street Station Methodist Episcopal Church, which he had attended while living in the area.

Douglass Place was listed on the National Register of Historic Places in 1983.
