= Julia Griffiths =

British abolitionist (1811 – 1895)

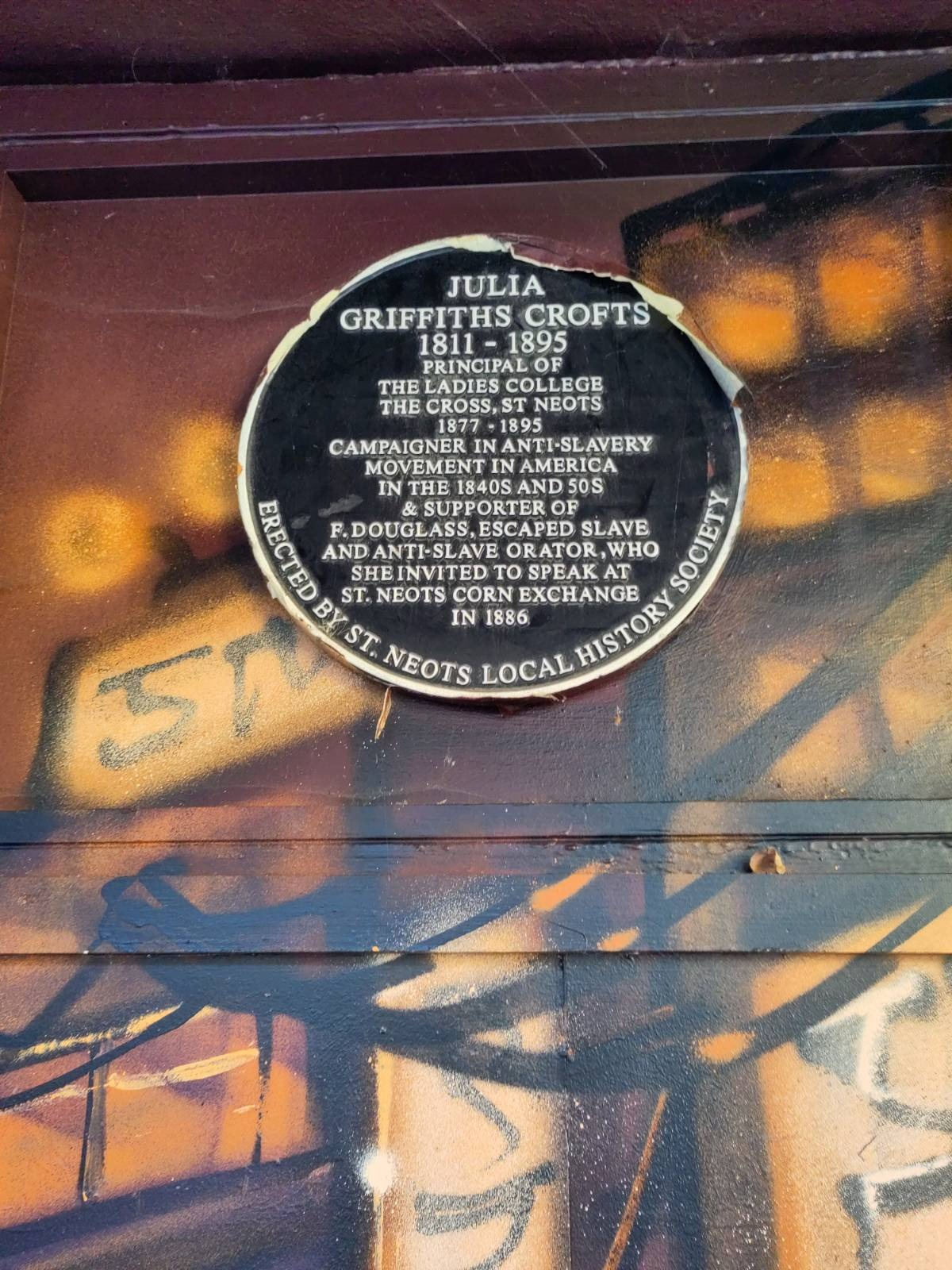
Plaque for Julia Griffiths in St Neots

Julia Griffiths (29 May 1811 – 1895) was a British abolitionist who worked with the prominent American abolitionist Frederick Douglass. The two met in London, England, during Douglass's tour of the British Isles in 1845–47. In 1849, Griffiths joined Douglass in Rochester, New York, and edited, published and promoted his work. She was one of six founding members of the influential Rochester Ladies Anti-Slavery Society. She is most noted for publishing Autographs for Freedom, an anthology of anti-slavery literature. In 1854, there were unfounded accusations, levelled by William Lloyd Garrison, that Douglass and Griffiths engaged in infidelity. Griffiths returned to England in 1855, where she continued to organize ladies' anti-slavery societies, write columns for Douglass's newspapers, and raise funds for the Rochester Ladies Anti-Slavery Sewing Society, later called the Rochester Ladies' Anti-Slavery and Freedmen's Aid Society. In 1859, she married Henry O. Crofts, a Methodist minister and former missionary in Canada. After her husband's death, Crofts ran a school for girls in St. Neots.

== Early life ==
=== Family ===
Griffiths was born in London to Thomas Griffiths and his wife Charlotte, both of whom were Dissenters, belonging to what became the Congregational denomination. Her father, following bankruptcy, set up a jewellers shop on Oxford Street (which included a lithographer's printing press), which he eventually re-established as a publishers and bookshop. Her father continued publishing various periodicals and magazines whilst Julia was involved in the production of Douglass's newspapers.

=== Education ===
While documentation of Griffiths' early life and education remains limited, her work as Douglass' editor and tutor implies a high level of literacy and formal education.

== Relationship to Douglass ==
The origins of Griffith's abolitionism can only be speculated based upon sparse evidence. The editor of the Anti-Slavery Reporter referenced her mother as a friend of Wilber-force in May 1857, so her family may have had involvement in the anti-slavery movement. Some scholars suggest Douglass and Julia Griffiths' first meeting was over Christmas 1846 in Summerhill, Newcastle in the home of the Quaker Richardson family.
