= Douglass family =

American family established by Frederick Douglass

Douglass
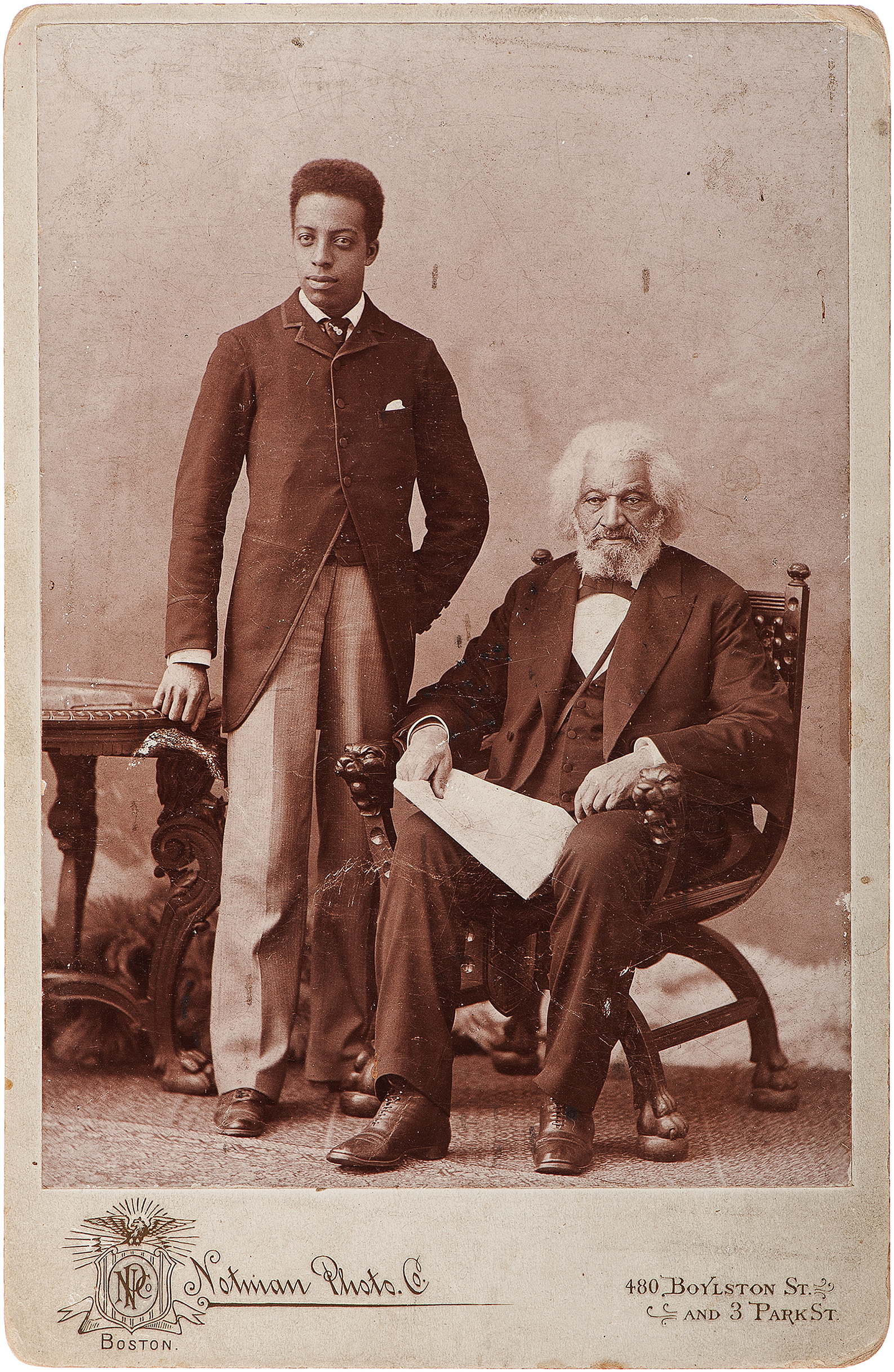
- Frederick Douglass (right) with grandson Joseph Douglass (c. 1890s).
- Parent family: Bailey
- Country: United States
- Etymology: Douglas
- Origin: Cordova, Talbot County, Maryland, US
- Founded: 1830s
- Founder: Frederick Douglass
- Estates: Frederick Douglass National Historic Site; Douglass Place

The Douglass family is a prominent American family originating from Cordova, Maryland, United States. It was founded by the politician and activist Frederick Douglass.

== History ==
Born Frederick Augustus Washington Bailey, Frederick Douglass assumed the surname from the poem The Lady of the Lake (1810) by Sir Walter Scott after his escape from slavery to hide from his former master. He did this as a result of the proposal of a friend. As he explains in his first autobiography:

I gave Mr. Johnson the privilege of choosing me a name, but told him he must not take from me the name of "Frederick." I must hold on to that, to preserve a sense of my identity. Mr. Johnson had just been reading the Lady of the Lake, and at once suggested that my name be "Douglass."

His family would later go on to become a part of the African-American upper class, continuing to provide leadership and intermarrying with descendants of the African-American educationist and political kingmaker Booker T. Washington.

== Members in selection ==
- Frederick Douglass (c.1818–1895), statesman, writer
- Anna Murray Douglass (1813–1882) abolitionist, first wife of Frederick Douglass
  - Rosetta Douglass-Sprague (1839–1906), teacher and activist
    - Fredericka Douglass Sprague Perry (1872–1943), philanthropist
  - Lewis Henry Douglass (1840–1908), soldier
  - Frederick Douglass, Jr. (1842–1892), abolitionist, essayist, newspaper editor, soldier
  - Charles Remond Douglass (1844–1920), soldier, journalist, and real-estate developer
    - Joseph Douglass (1871–1935), musician
- Helen Pitts Douglass (1838–1903), suffragist, second wife of Frederick Douglass

== See also ==
- List of things named after Frederick Douglass
- Frederick Douglass Memorial
- Frederick Douglass National Historic Site
- Frederick Douglass Memorial Bridge
