= Rosetta Douglass =

American teacher and activist

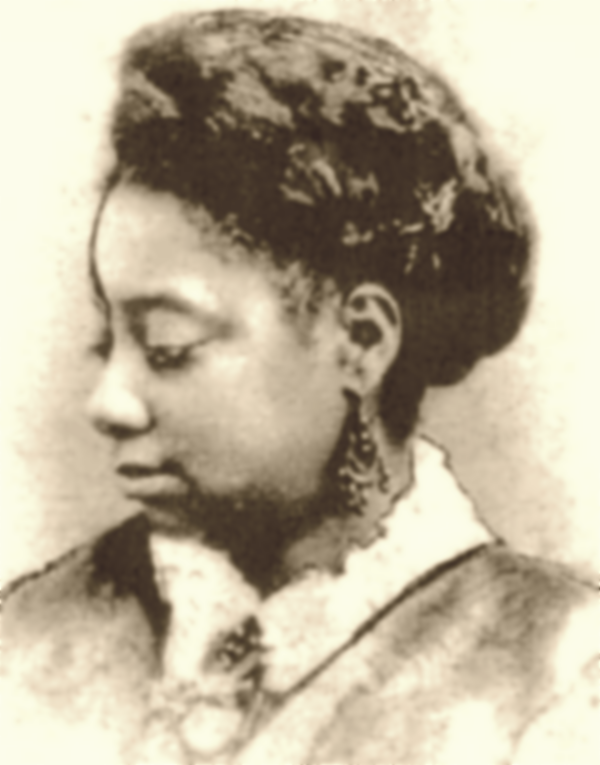
- Born: Rosetta Douglass; June 24, 1839; New Bedford, Massachusetts, US
- Died: November 25, 1906 (aged 67); Washington, D.C., US
- Known for: Activism
- Notable work: "My Mother as I Recall Her"
- Relatives: Douglass family

Rosetta Douglass-Sprague (June 24, 1839 – November 25, 1906) was an American teacher and activist. She was a founding member of the National Association for Colored Women. Her parents were Anna Murray Douglass and Frederick Douglass.

== Early life and education ==
Rosetta was born to Anna Murray-Douglass and Frederick Douglass in 1839, in New Bedford, Massachusetts. She was the eldest of five children, with her younger siblings being Lewis Henry Douglass, Frederick Douglass Jr., Charles Remond Douglass, and Annie Douglass (died at the age of ten).

When she was five, she moved with her parents to Lynn, Massachusetts. When she was six, she stayed with Abigail and Lydia Mott, from Albany, New York. Abigail taught her to read and write, and Lydia taught her to sew. At the age of 11, she assisted her father in making and packaging his newspaper.

In 1845, the Rochester Board of Education closed public schools to black students. Frederick Douglass sent Rosetta to a private school rather than send her to an all-black school that Rochester set up for black students. She eventually was tutored between the ages of two and seven. In 1848, Rosetta was admitted into the Seward Seminary in Rochester, New York. Rosetta was segregated from the white students while she was there, and her father spoke out against this in his newspaper. She was expelled after a vote by her white classmates with only one vote against her, proposed by the white, abolitionist director. She also attended Oberlin College’s Young Ladies Preparatory and Massachusetts' Salem Normal School.

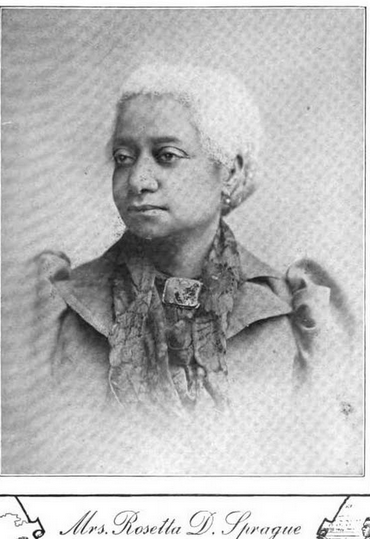
Rosetta D. Sprague from Daniel Wallace Culp’s 1902 book in that also profiled her and included her essay on African Americans in the United States

== Marriage and Family Life ==
On December 24, 1863, she married Nathan Sprague. Her husband had been enslaved and was poorly educated. He struggled to find his footing and a job. She had seven children (including Fredericka Douglass Sprague Perry), and many grandchildren.

Rosetta was a critical thinker like her father, but struggled against the demands of gender roles during her time. Douglass worked with her father, and had a keen sense of social justice issues. She did not support her father's interracial marriage with Helen Pitts Douglass after her mother's death. She also advised her father against accepting the presidency of the Freedman’s Bank.

== Teaching, writing, and activism ==
Douglass worked as a teacher. She eventually became primarily a homemaker and wife. She wrote the paper My Mother as I Recall Her in 1900, as well as the paper What Role is the Educated Negro Woman to Play in the Uplifting of Her Race?

She wrote “The galling chain and merciless lash were the instruments used to accomplish humiliation and degradation of the African. Avarice was the factor in the composition of the character of a large number of white men of America that wrought such ravishes in the well-being of the African.” She also wrote, “Allow the Negro two hundred and fifty years of unselfish contact to offset the two hundred and fifty years of Caucasian selfishness, and be as assiduous in his regeneration as you were in his degradation - then judge him.”

She went on to become a founding member of the National Association for Colored Women.

== Death ==
Douglass was a member of the First Church of Seventh-day Adventists, in Washington, D.C. until her death. She died on November 25, 1906.
