= Paul Molyneaux =

African-American actor in Victorian England

- Born: 1856
- Died: 1891 (aged 34–35)
- Occupation: Actor

Paul Molyneaux (c.1856–1891) was an African-American actor, who performed as a Shakespearean actor in Victorian England.

== Life ==
Molyneux was the son of Aaron Molyneaux Hewlett, a physical education instructor at Harvard University, and Virginia Josephine Lewis. His sister Virginia Hewlett married Frederick Douglass Jr., and his brother Emanuel D. Molyneaux Hewlett was the first black graduate of the Boston University School of Law.

Until his father's death in 1871, Molyneaux helped him as a boxing coach. He then started training as an actor under the retired actor Wyzeman Marshall. Later in the 1870s Molyneaux toured America with Georgia Gordon Taylor's Jubilee Singers.

In 1880 he recruited a supporting company to play Othello to a mixed Boston audience.By 1881 he had come to Britain, where he made his acting debut playing Othello and Richard III in North London.Though the New York Globe reported favourable reviews, Molyneaux complained of the prejudice he faced in a pamphlet he sent back to America, The Curse of Prejudice; or, a Struggle for Fame. His self-financed productions proving unviable, he rejoined the Jubilee Singers, who were by now touring the United Kingdom. He became their speaker, lecturing on the condition of black people in America. Unemployed in 1886, he secured three years work touring Scotland with a production of Uncle Tom's Cabin.

Around 1889 he returned to America, where he lived with his lawyer brother in Washington DC, and died there "from brain trouble" in 1891.
