= Fredericka Douglass Sprague Perry =

American social welfare activist (1872–1943)

- Born: August 9, 1872; Rochester, New York, U.S.
- Died: October 23, 1943 (aged 71); Kansas City, Missouri, U.S.
- Occupations: Activist, philanthropist
- Spouse: John Edward Perry
- Relatives: Douglass family

Fredericka Douglass Sprague Perry (August 9, 1872 – October 23, 1943) was an American philanthropist and activist. Perry founded the Colored Big Sister Home for Girls in 1934 in Kansas City, Missouri. With her husband, John E. Perry, she worked to provide better health care to African-American children.

== Early life and education ==
Born Fredericka Douglass Sprague in Rochester, New York, on August 9, 1872. She was the daughter of Rosetta Douglass and granddaughter of Frederick Douglass. She was the fifth oldest child of the seven children of Rosetta Douglass Sprague and Nathan Sprague. She attended public school in Washington, DC, and then the Mechanics Institute in Rochester, New York.

== Career ==
In 1906, she moved to Jefferson City, Missouri, where she taught home economics at Lincoln University. She married Dr. John Edward Perry in 1912, founder of the Wheatley-Provident Hospital (previously called the Perry Sanitarium), the first private hospital for Black people in Kansas City. She moved to Kansas City to work with her husband at the hospital.

Perry became involved in the African-American women's clubs movement. Perry had been a juvenile court worker, and she was specifically concerned with rectifying the harsh treatment of dependent adolescent children of color who were often placed in a state institution for juvenile delinquents until they reached their majority. In 1923, she initiated the formation of the Missouri State Association of Colored Girls, sponsored by the senior women's association. Kansas City was one of the first cities to have such a group.

In 1934, with the help of Kansas City Federation of Colored Women's Club, she founded the Colored Big Sister Home for Girls. Fredericka also served as the chairperson of the National Association of Colored Girls. She composed the words of the state song "Show Me"; and the motto "Learning As We Climb" for the Missouri State Association of Colored Girls.

Perry also help found the Civic Protective Association in Kansas City, served as a trustee of the Frederick Douglass Memorial and Historical Association, and was a member of the John Brown Memorial Association.

== Personal life ==
In 1912 she married Dr. John Edward Perry, with whom she had one son. Perry died on October 23, 1943, at Wheatley-Provident Hospital in Kansas City, Missouri.

== Legacy ==
On July 25, 2023, Rochester Institute of Technology announced it was renaming Nathaniel Rochester Hall to honor Fredericka Douglass Sprague Perry.
