= Julia Dorsey (suffragist) =

African-American suffragist (c. 1850–1919)

- Born: c. 1850; Maryland
- Died: February 1919 (68 years old); Washington, D.C.
- Occupation: Homemaker
- Known for: African American suffragism

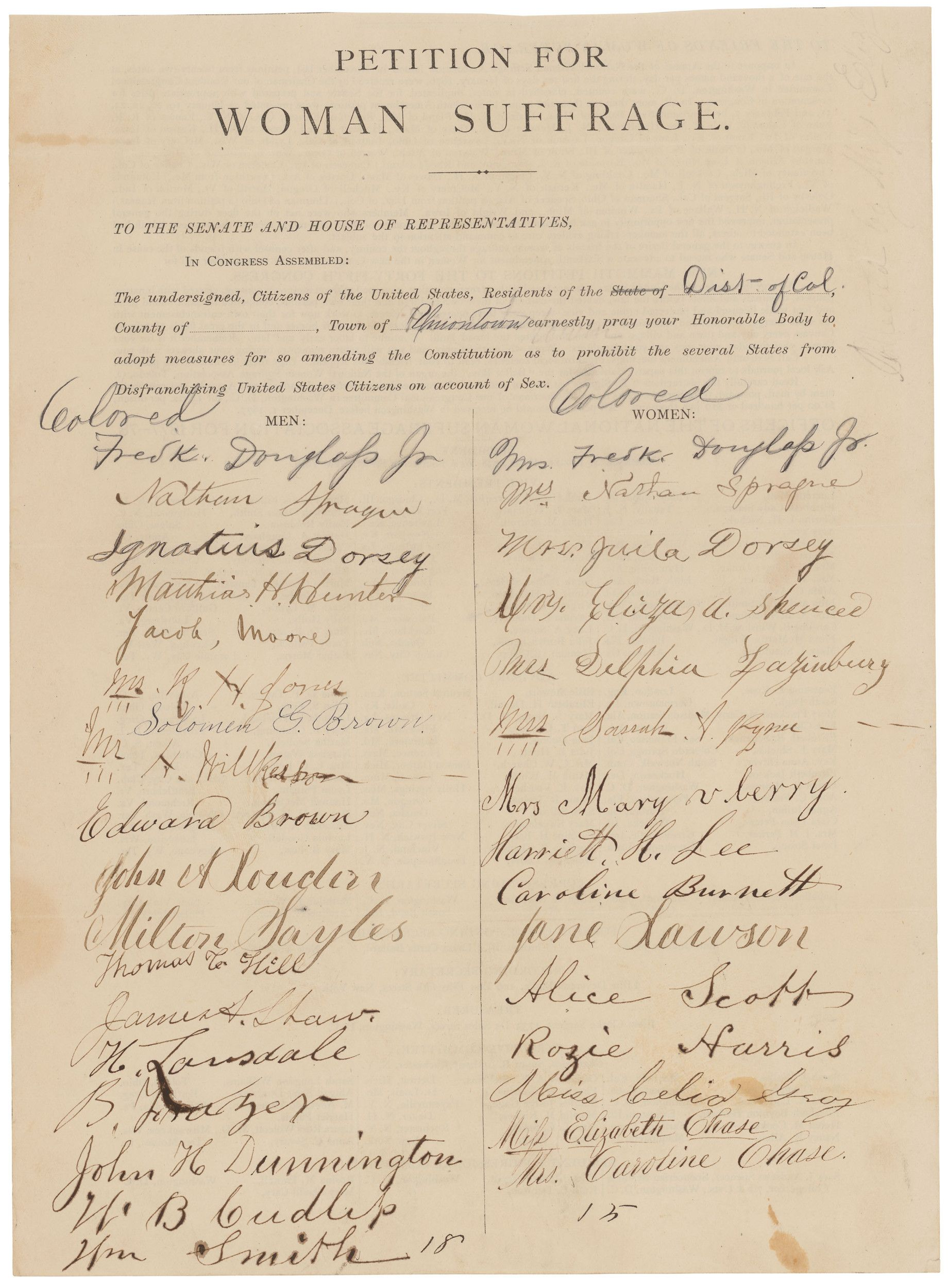
Julia Dorsey's Signature on the Petition for Women's Suffrage

Julia Dorsey (c. 1850–1919) was an African American suffragist.

She and her husband, Ignatius Dorsey, were African American signers of an 1877 petition in Washington D.C. calling for women's suffrage. Other signers of the petition included Frederick Douglass, Jr. and his wife, and his sister, Rosetta Douglass Sprague, and her husband Nathan Sprague.

== Early life ==
Dorsey, whose maiden name is unknown, was born in Maryland in about 1850. She married Ignatius Dorsey and together they lived in Hillsdale in Washington, DC. The Dorseys were listed among the "first Settlers of Barry Farm" with a lot on Sumner Ave. in Hillsdale. In 1880 Ignatius Dorsey purchased a lot of land on nearby Nicholas Avenue for $200 and built a two-story house. The couple had no children at this date; Julia Dorsey was recorded as keeping house, while her husband worked as a laborer.

== Becoming a suffragist ==
The Dorseys befriended the Douglass family in the Hillsdale neighborhood, now Anacostia, and came to support the woman suffrage movement. An associated petition drive organized by the National Woman Suffrage Association called for a constitutional amendment that would give women the right to vote.

== Later life ==
Julia and Ignatius Dorsey are not seen in the 1900 census, but she was a 62-year-old widow in D.C. in 1910, renting rooms to five Black lodgers. Julia Dorsey died in February 1919 at age 68 at her home on 569 Stanton Road in Anacostia.
