= Julia Dorsey =

Julia Dorsey may refer to:

- Julia Dorsey (soccer) (born 2000), American soccer and lacrosse player
- Julia Dorsey (suffragist) (c. 1850–1919), African-American suffragist

== See also ==
- Julie Dorsey, American computer scientist
