= Aaron Molyneaux Hewlett =

First African American instructor at Harvard University

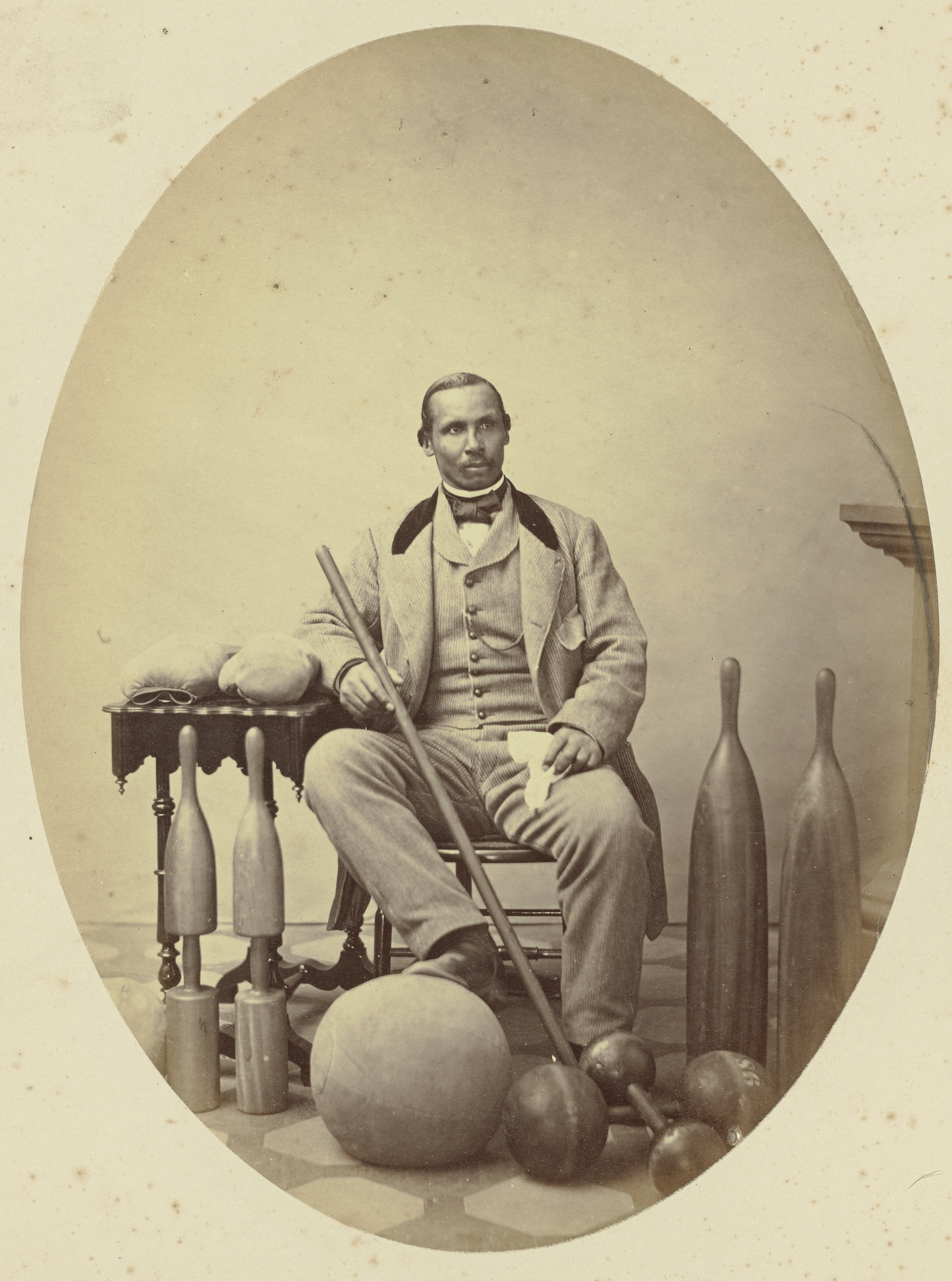
- Hewlett in 1860
- Born: 1820; New York, U.S.
- Died: December 6, 1871
- Occupations: Instructor and superintendent of physical education
- Known for: First African American instructor at Harvard University
- Spouse: Virginia Josephine Lewis
- Children: 5, including Virginia Hewlett Douglass, Emanuel D. Molyneaux Hewlett

Aaron Molyneaux Hewlett (c. 1820–1871) was an educator who was the first African American instructor at Harvard University where he oversaw the college's gymnasium. He is recognized as the first African American superintendent of physical education in American higher education. Hewlett was instructor and curator of the college gymnasium from its construction in 1859 until his death in 1871 and has been called the "Father of Boxing" at Harvard.

== Biography ==
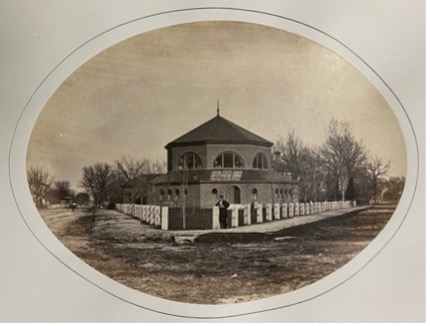
Harvard Gymnasium (1858-1878), Cambridge, Massachusetts

Hewlett lived in Brooklyn before his job at Harvard. He worked as a porter but also taught boxing and wrestling. The New York Clipper, the leading New York sports paper, considered him "one of the best boxers in Brooklyn." in 1854 he quit his job as a porter, moved to Worcester, Massachusetts, and opened “Molineaux House,” a sparring academy, at his residence.

In September 1859, Hewlett began instruction at Harvard using his own system which included the use of exercise equipment including, German and English gymnastics, Boxing, and Indian clubs in order to strengthen the body. The 1860 portrait of him and his equipment, taken by George Kendall Warren, is the first known photograph of a medicine ball in the United States. After Hewlett had been working at Harvard for ten years, a local Boston paper commented that Harvard's "Athletics have come almost to rank with Mathematics."

Hewlett participated in civic life and stood up for his rights. In addition to his work at Harvard, Hewlett was also partial owner of a clothing and variety store on Brattle Street in Cambridge where he sold gymnastic equipment. When he and his daughter were denied their seats at the Boston Theater in 1866, he petitioned the Commonwealth of Massachusetts to better enforce its own laws and revoke the licenses from establishments that illegally discriminated against African Americans.

== Personal life ==
Hewlett was born in New York, to Isaac and Rachel Hewlett. He married Virginia Josephine Lewis, a physical education instructor.

They had six children: Virginia Hewlett Douglass, a suffragist who married Frederick Douglass Jr.; Emanuel D. Molyneaux Hewlett, who became the first black graduate of the Boston University School of Law; Aaron; Isaac; Paul Molyneaux, who became a renowned Shakesperian actor; and Aaronella.

The New York Times published an editorial in 1916 about the "boxing revival" of the time at Harvard, mentioning Hewlett – deceased for over forty years – as a prize fighter and a "midnight Mars" who came to Harvard from "the traditions of the ring." Emanuel Molyneaux called the editorial "uncomplimentary" and denied his father had been a prize fighter. The name Molyneaux or Molineaux occurs several times in the history of the ring. In 1809, Tom Molyneaux and his father, Jacob, were framed prizefighter at the old Catherine Markets in New York City. The never defeated Virginia native Jim Wharton "Molyneaux the Morocco Prince" (1813-1856).
