= Helen Pitts Douglass =

American suffragist (1838–1903)

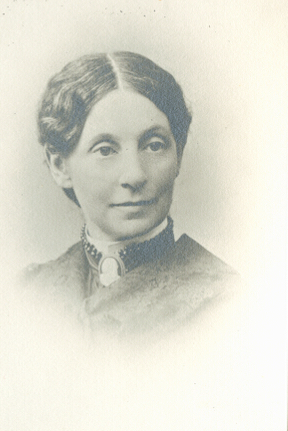
- Born: Helen Pitts Bobby; 1838; Honeoye, New York, U.S.
- Died: 1903 (aged 64–65); Washington, D.C., U.S.
- Occupation: Suffragist
- Spouse: Frederick Douglass (m. 1884; died 1895)
- Relatives: Douglass family (by marriage)

Helen Pitts Douglass (1838–1903) was an American suffragist, known for being the second wife of Frederick Douglass. She also created the Frederick Douglass Memorial and Historical Association, which became the Frederick Douglass National Historic Site.

== Early life and education ==
She was born in Honeoye, New York, in 1838. Her parents were activists in the abolitionist and suffragist movements. Pitts graduated from Mount Holyoke College (then called the Mount Holyoke Female Seminary) in 1859. After her graduation, she returned to her parents' home in Honeoye.

After the American Civil War, she taught at the Hampton Institute, a school that educated black men and women. While teaching at the institution, she caused local controversy by accusing several local residents of directing insults and abuse towards her students, resulting in their arrest. In 1882, Helen moved to Uniontown in Washington, D.C., to live with her uncle, where she lived next door to Frederick Douglass at his Cedar Hill home.

== Activism ==
She was active in the women's rights movement and co-edited The Alpha, with Caroline Winslow, in Washington. In 1882, Douglass hired Helen as a clerk in the office of the Recorder of Deeds in Washington, to which he had just been assigned. Because he was writing his autobiography, Life and Times of Frederick Douglass and was often lecturing, Helen aided him frequently in his work.

== Marriage to Frederick Douglass ==
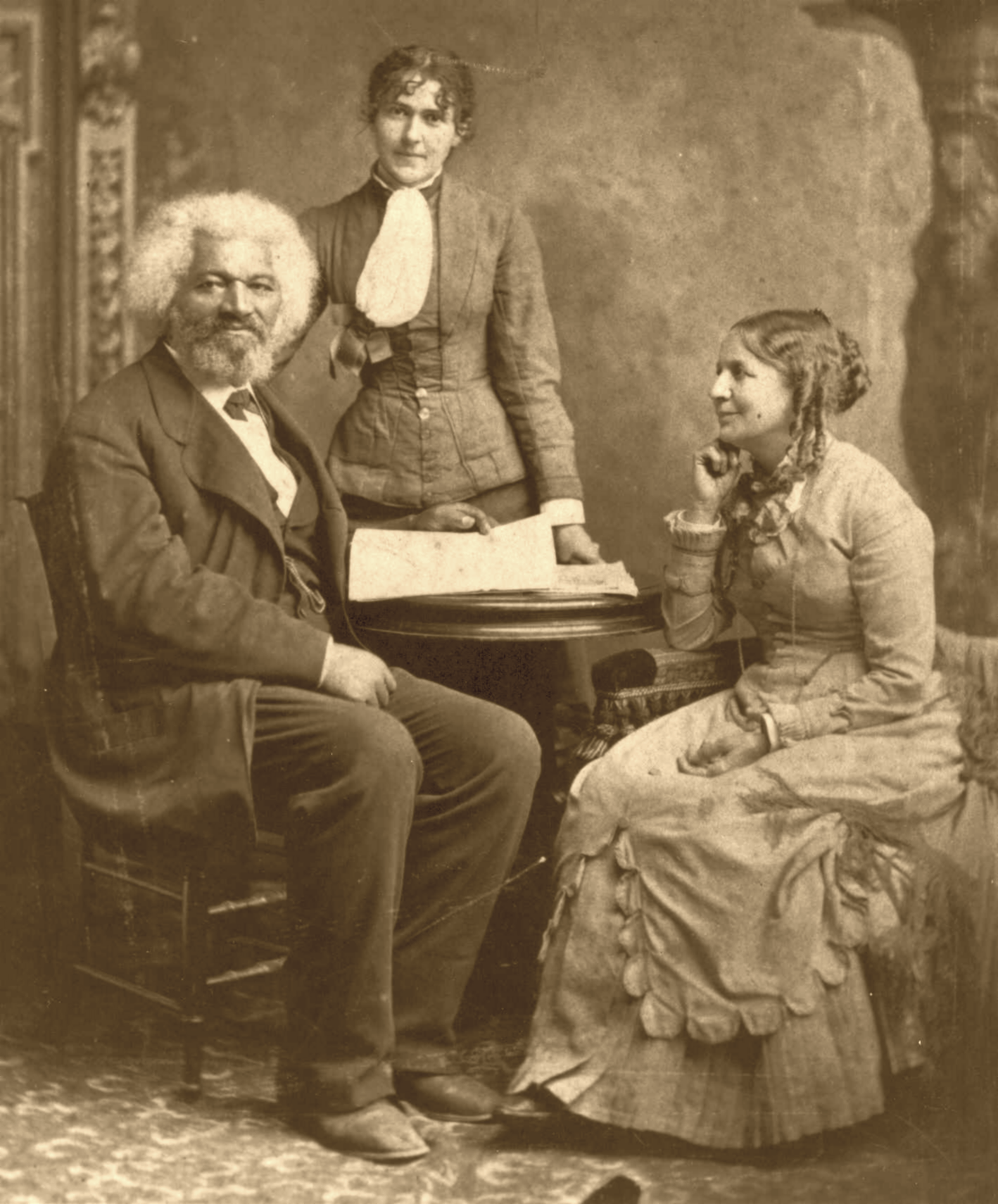
Pitts, seated, with Frederick Douglass. The standing woman is her sister, Eva Pitts.

Douglass's first wife, Anna Murray Douglass, died on August 4, 1882. After almost a year and a half of depression, Douglass married Helen on January 24, 1884. They were married by the Rev. Francis J. Grimké, a prominent African-American preacher.

The marriage was generally the subject of scorn by both white and black residents in the town, though the Douglasses were firm in their convictions. "Love came to me, and I was not afraid to marry the man I loved because of his color," she said. Douglass laughingly commented, "This proves I am impartial. My first wife was the color of my mother and the second, the color of my father."

A main source of support was Elizabeth Cady Stanton, who said: "In defense of the right to ... marry whom we please – we might quote some of the basic principles of our government [and] suggest that in some things individual rights to tastes should control." Helen and Frederick were married for eleven years, until his sudden death from a heart attack in 1895. They did not have any children together. Frederick had five children with his first wife Anna: Lewis, Frederick Jr., Charles, Rosetta, and Annie.

=== Building a memorial to Frederick Douglass ===
Douglass's will left Cedar Hill to Helen, but it lacked the number of witnesses needed in bequests of real estate and was ruled invalid. Helen suggested to his children and their spouses that they agree to set Cedar Hill apart as a memorial to their father and deed it to a board of trustees. The children declined, insisting that the estate be sold and the money divided among all the heirs.

With borrowed money, Helen bought the property and then devoted the rest of her life to planning and establishing the Frederick Douglass Memorial and Historical Association. Besides effecting passage of the law incorporating the association, she worked to raise funds to maintain the estate. For eight years, she lectured throughout the northeast.

During the last year of her life, Helen was ill and unable to lecture, as well as discouraged by the falling off of contributions for her cause. She begged the Rev. Francis Grimke not to let her work fall by the wayside in her absence. He suggested that if the mortgage on Cedar Hill should not be paid off in her lifetime, money from the sale of the property should go to two college scholarships in her and Frederick's names. She agreed on the condition that the scholarships be in Douglass's name only.

== Death ==
Helen Pitts Douglass died in 1903, aged 65 years old. She wished to be buried on the site of Cedar Hill but laws at this time prevented it. She had no funeral or memorial service and was quietly buried next to Frederick Douglass at Mount Hope Cemetery in Rochester, New York. After her death, Cedar Hill's $5,500 mortgage was reduced to $4,000, and the National Association of Colored Women, led by Mary B. Talbert of Buffalo, New York, raised funds to buy it.

Now administered by the National Park Service, the home is open for tours as a historic house museum, to inform visitors of Douglass's contributions to freedom.

== See also ==
- List of suffragists and suffragettes
- Timeline of women's suffrage
- First-wave feminism
