= Highland Beach, Maryland =

Highland Beach
- Town
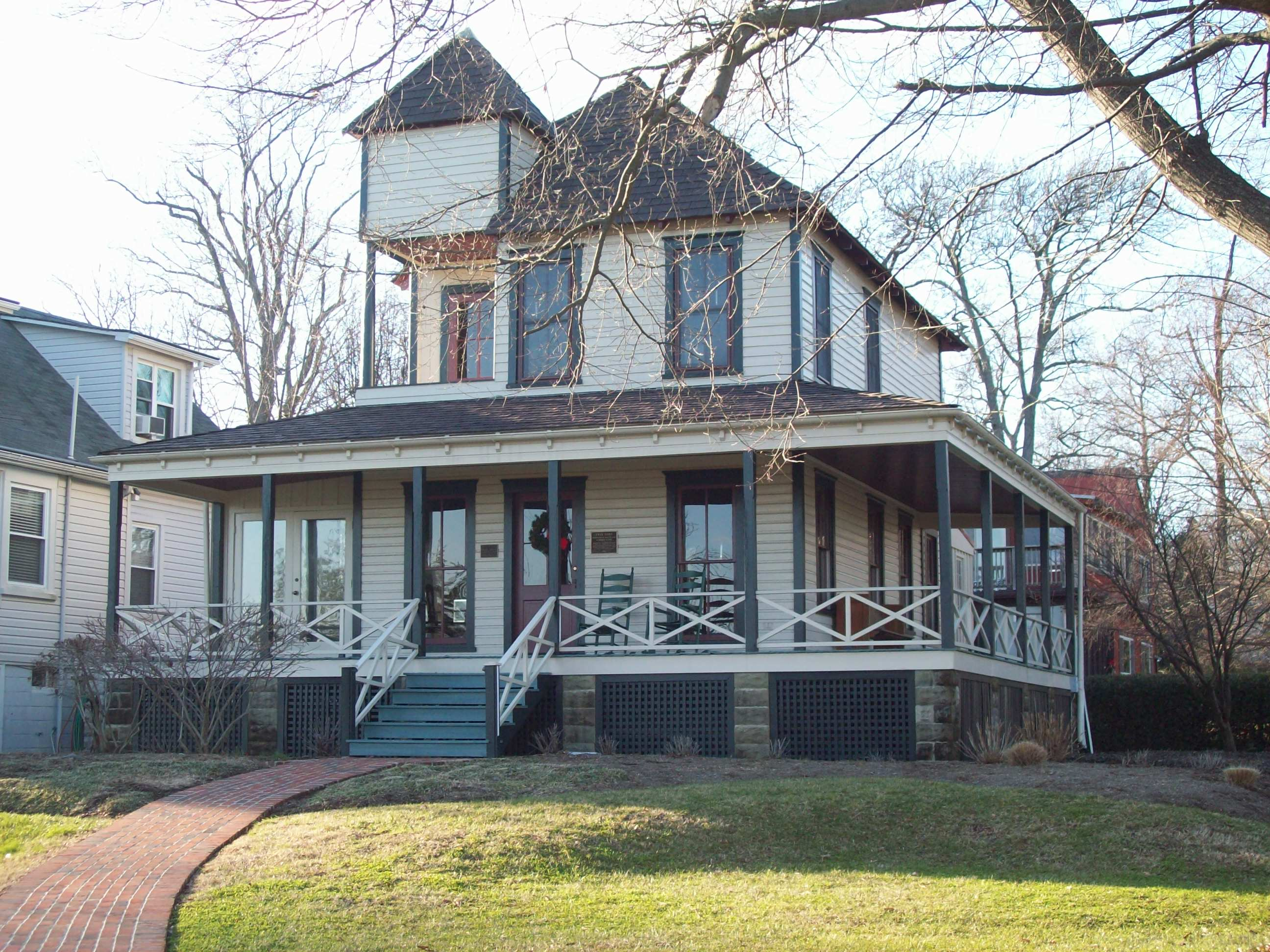
- Douglass Summer House, December 2009

- Seal

- Location in Maryland

- Location within Maryland Location within the United States
- Coordinates: 38°55′55″N 76°27′59″W
- Country: United States
- State: Maryland
- County: Anne Arundel
- Founded: 1893
- Incorporated: 1922

Government
  - Mayor: Crystal Chissell

Area
  - Total: 0.077 sq mi (0.20 km^{2})
  - Land: 0.069 sq mi (0.18 km^{2})
  - Water: 0.0077 sq mi (0.02 km^{2}) 14.29%
- Elevation: 20 ft (6 m)

Population (2020)
  - Total: 118
  - Density: 1,723.8/sq mi (665.58/km^{2})
- Time zone: UTC-5 (Eastern)
  - Summer (DST): UTC-4 (Eastern)
- ZIP code: 21403
- Area code: 410
- FIPS code: 24-38500
- GNIS feature ID: 0590467
- Website: www.highlandbeachmd.org

Highland Beach is a town in Anne Arundel County, Maryland, United States. Per the 2020 census, the population was 118. The town was founded late in the 19th century by affluent African Americans from Washington, D.C., and Baltimore, looking for a summer retreat on the Chesapeake Bay. The town's incorporated status gave it a unique standing in empowering it to maintain its own police force. Celebrities with homes there have included historian and author Alex Haley, actor and comedian Bill Cosby, and tennis champion Arthur Ashe. Street names in the town include Crummell, Dunbar, Henson, Augusta, Douglass, Langston, and Washington, which were chosen to honor leading African Americans.

== History ==
=== 19th century ===
Highland Beach was founded in summer 1893 by Maj. Charles Remond Douglass, (Frederick Douglass's son) and his wife, Laura, after they had been turned away from a restaurant at the nearby Bay Ridge resort because of their race. Charles Douglass was a retired military officer who served with the 54th Massachusetts Infantry Regiment of the United States Colored Troops during the American Civil War. After being turned away, Maj. Douglass decided to buy beachfront property directly south of Bay Ridge and sell lots to family and friends.

Maj. Douglass bought a 40-acre (160,000 m^{2}) tract with 500 feet (150 m) of beachfront on the Chesapeake Bay from Daniel Brashears, a Black farmer and waterman of Anne Arundel County, and turned it into a summer enclave. He had two homes built - one for himself, his wife, and their children, and one as a retirement home for his father, Frederick Douglass, which was known as "Twin Oaks." Frederick Douglass's house, now called the Douglass Summer House, was listed on the National Register of Historic Places in 1992. It became a regular gathering place for upper-class African-Americans. Robert Terrell, the first Black municipal court judge in Washington, DC, and his wife, activist and civic leader, Dr. Mary Church Terrell, built a home, "Villa Aloha," in 1915 on the property they purchased in 1893, which was next door to the Douglass Summer House. Their grandson, Raymond L. Langston, former Highland Beach mayor, owns this home.

Among the residents and guests of the town were Paul Robeson, Robert Weaver, Harriet Tubman, W. E. B. Du Bois, and poets Langston Hughes and Paul Laurence Dunbar. Frederick Douglass visited and would have become a resident but he died in 1895, before the house that his son was building for him was completed.

=== 20th century ===
In the early 1900s, a horse stable, a guest house, a hotel, and tennis courts were all built in the community to accommodate the growing number of residents and their guests. The guest house, which was built by George Bowen in 1902, was a very popular site for lectures, discussions, and informal gatherings. The hotel, which was built by Richard Francis Ware in the 1920s, was a popular spot for Saturday night dances and a meeting place for church groups. It was converted to a private home in the 1970s.

After the death of Charles R. Douglass in 1920, his son, Haley G. Douglass, took over the development of the area. Haley Douglass became a member of the Board of Commissioners for the town of Highland Beach, and incorporated the town on May 12, 1922, making it the first African-American municipality in Maryland. He and his friends controlled the community for the next thirty years, keeping it small and exclusive. He served as Mayor of Highland Beach from the time of its incorporation through his death on January 20, 1954. In 1922, Osborne T. Taylor, a Highland Beach resident, bought 13 acres south of Highland Beach and created Venice Beach, which still exists.

In the June 29, 1950, edition of the Cumberland Evening Times (of Cumberland, Maryland), Census District Supervisor Everard Briscoe mentioned that Highland Beach had 45 homes and five year-round residents, with all of the 45 homes being occupied during vacation season. In the September 18, 1968, edition of The Evening Sun (of Baltimore, Maryland), Highland Beach is described as a "44-acre retreat of 52 clapboard, shingle, and stucco cottages that date back to 1894 - plus 1,000 feet of waterfront where no pets or picnicking are allowed." A Dr. E. B. Henderson, 85 years old at that time, is named as the only surviving member of the 1922 incorporating committee. He is mentioned as the former head of Physical Education in DC Public Schools, with about 40 years of service there. According to Dr. Henderson, poet Paul Laurence Dunbar wrote "Ships that Pass in the Night," one of his most famous poems, while visiting Highland Beach. Mrs. Fannie Howard Douglass, widow of Joseph H. Douglass (grandson of Frederick Douglass), was in her 80s and living in the Twin Oaks home. Joseph and Fannie's son, Frederick Douglass, III, married Nettie Hancock Washington, the granddaughter of Booker T. Washington, joining two of the most esteemed Black families of the 19th and 20th centuries.

=== 21st century ===
Although founded as a summer resort, it is now a town of year-round residents who choose not to permit commercial establishments. There are some sixty homes, many of them still owned and occupied by descendants of the original settlers. The residents are proud and protective of their town's heritage, established over a century ago by people determined to overcome the prejudices of their post-Reconstruction times. As of the 2000 census, less than 40 percent of the town's residents were African American. A 2018 report however, indicated that 53.5% of the population of 114 people identified as Black.

The history of Highland Beach is recounted in the book The Land Was Ours: African American Beaches from Jim Crow to the Sunbelt South by Andrew W. Kahrl. The author described the development of Highland Beach as part of the emergence of a niche market in African American planned vacation communities. Highland Beach on the Chesapeake Bay: Maryland's First African American Incorporated Town is another book about the town which was written by longtime residents – Jack E. Nelson, Margo Dean Pinson, and former mayor, Raymond L. Langston.

== Geography ==
Highland Beach is located at 38°55′55″N 76°27′59″W (38.931880, -76.466455).

According to the United States Census Bureau, the town has a total area of 0.07 square miles (0.18 km^{2}), of which 0.06 square miles (0.16 km^{2}) is land and 0.01 square miles (0.03 km^{2}) is water.

== Transportation ==
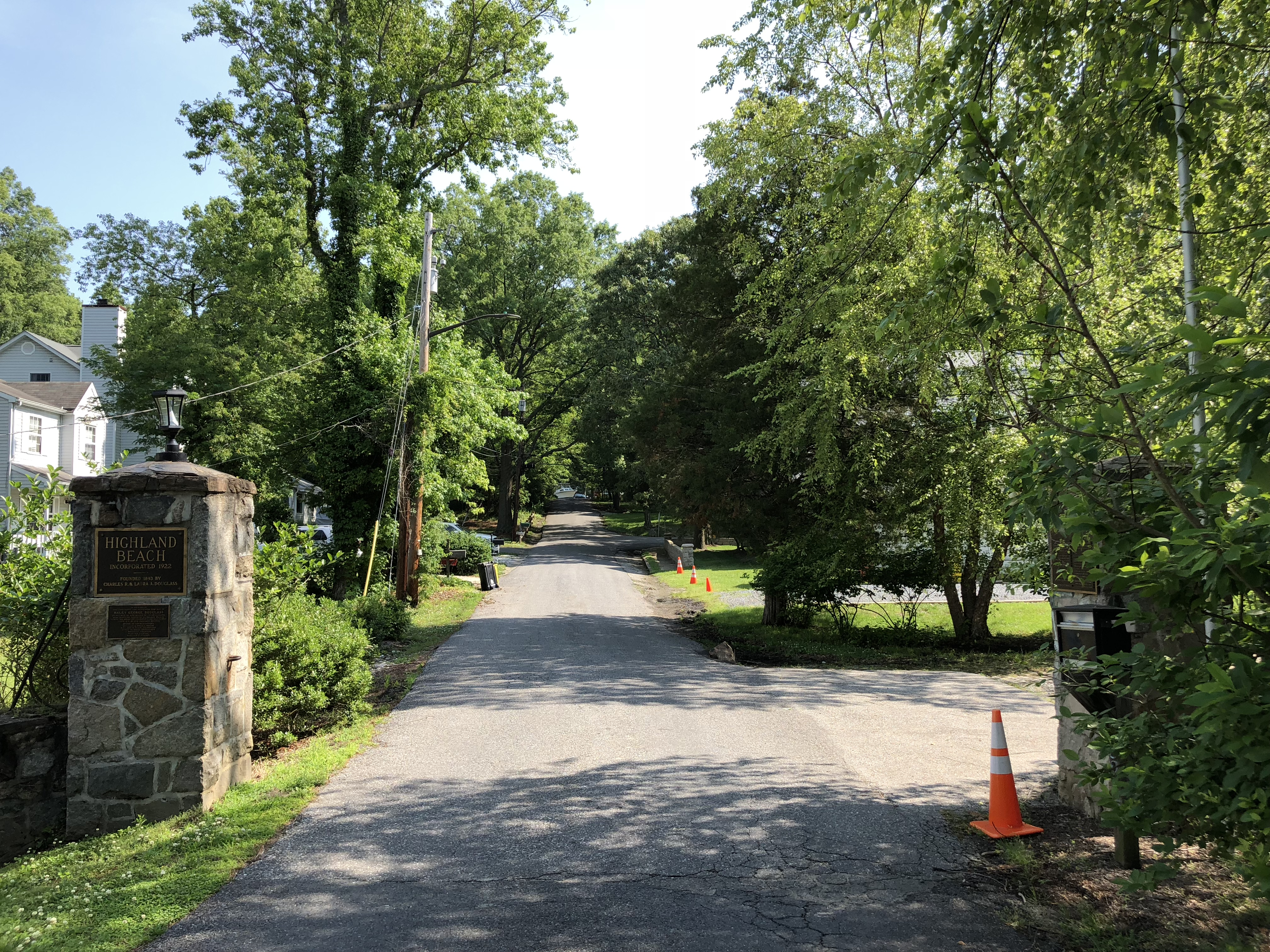
The only entrance to Highland Beach, at the end of Bay Highlands Drive

The main method of transportation to and from Highland Beach is by road. However, no state highways serve the town, and the only road providing access is Bay Highlands Drive.

== Demographics ==
Historical population
Census	Pop.	Note	%±
1940	9		—
1950	5		−44.4%
1960	5		0.0%
1970	6		20.0%
1980	8		33.3%
1990	102		1,175.0%
2000	109		6.9%
2010	96		−11.9%
2020	118		22.9%
U.S. Decennial Census; 2010 2020

=== Racial and ethnic composition ===
Highland Beach town, Maryland – Racial and ethnic composition Note: the US Census treats Hispanic/Latino as an ethnic category. This table excludes Latinos from the racial categories and assigns them to a separate category. Hispanics/Latinos may be of any race.
Race / Ethnicity (NH = Non-Hispanic)	Pop 2000	Pop 2010	Pop 2020	% 2000	% 2010	% 2020
White alone (NH)	57	19	36	52.29%	19.79%	30.51%
Black or African American alone (NH)	43	68	75	39.45%	70.83%	63.56%
Native American or Alaska Native alone (NH)	0	0	0	0.00%	0.00%	0.00%
Asian alone (NH)	0	1	0	0.00%	1.04%	0.00%
Native Hawaiian or Pacific Islander alone (NH)	0	0	0	0.00%	0.00%	0.00%
Other race alone (NH)	0	0	0	0.00%	0.00%	0.00%
Mixed race or Multiracial (NH)	9	3	6	8.26%	3.13%	5.08%
Hispanic or Latino (any race)	0	5	1	0.00%	5.21%	0.85%
Total	109	96	118	100.00%	100.00%	100.00%

=== 2010 census ===
As of the census of 2010, there were 96 people, 46 households, and 27 families living in the town. The population density was 1,600.0 inhabitants per square mile (617.8/km^{2}). There were 74 housing units at an average density of 1,233.3 per square mile (476.2/km^{2}). The racial makeup of the town was 19.8% White, 70.8% African American, 1.0% Asian, 5.2% from other races, and 3.1% from two or more races. Hispanic or Latino of any race were 5.2% of the population.

There were 46 households, of which 19.6% had children under the age of 18 living with them, 43.5% were married couples living together, 8.7% had a female householder with no husband present, 6.5% had a male householder with no wife present, and 41.3% were non-families. 30.4% of all households were made up of individuals, and 15.2% had someone living alone who was 65 years of age or older. The average household size was 2.09 and the average family size was 2.56.

The median age in the town was 55.7 years. 10.4% of residents were under the age of 18; 8.3% were between the ages of 18 and 24; 13.6% were from 25 to 44; 39.6% were from 45 to 64; and 28.1% were 65 years of age or older. The gender makeup of the town was 49.0% male and 51.0% female.

=== 2000 census ===
As of the census of 2000, there were 109 people, 44 households, and 27 families living in the town. The population density was 1,647.1 inhabitants per square mile (635.9/km^{2}). There were 80 housing units at an average density of 1,208.9 per square mile (466.8/km^{2}). The racial makeup of the town was 52.29% White, 39.45% African American, and 8.26% from two or more races.

There were 44 households, out of which 27.3% had children under the age of 18 living with them, 40.9% were married couples living together, 15.9% had a female householder with no husband present, and 38.6% were non-families. 31.8% of all households were made up of individuals, and 20.5% had someone living alone who was 65 years of age or older. The average household size was 2.48 and the average family size was 3.11.

In the town, the population was spread out, with 26.6% under the age of 18, 2.8% from 18 to 24, 28.4% from 25 to 44, 29.4% from 45 to 64, and 12.8% who were 65 years of age or older. The median age was 42 years. For every 100 females, there were 84.7 males. For every 100 females age 18 and over, there were 95.1 males.

The median income for a household in the town was $53,333, and the median income for a family was $82,379. Males had a median income of $36,563 versus $31,250 for females. The per capita income for the town was $27,802. There were no families and 1.5% of the population living below the poverty line, including no under eighteens and 10.5% of those over 64.
