= Douglass Summer House =

Historic house in Maryland, United States

- U.S. National Register of Historic Places
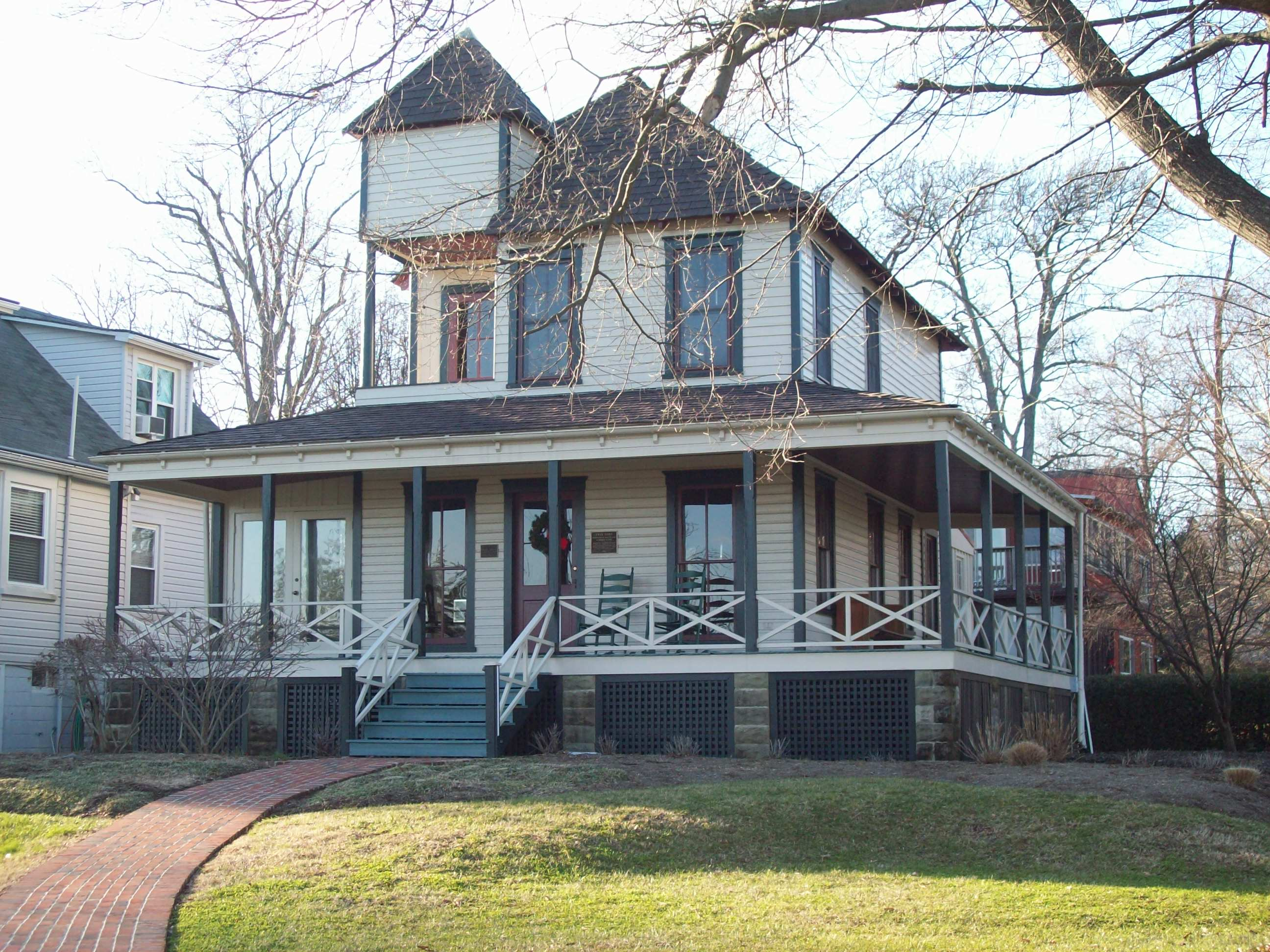
- Douglass Summer House, December 2009

- Location within Maryland Location within the United States
- Location: 3200 Wayman Ave., Highland Beach, Maryland
- Coordinates: 38°55′49″N 76°28′2″W
- Area: less than one acre
- Built: 1894
- Architectural style: Queen Anne
- NRHP reference No.: 92000069
- Added to NRHP: February 20, 1992

The Douglass Summer House is a historic home at Highland Beach, Anne Arundel County, Maryland, United States. It was built in 1894–95, is one of the first built in the small community of Highland Beach and is the oldest structure remaining at that place. The house was built in 1894–95 by Major Charles Douglass, son of Frederick Douglass (1818–1895). It is a 2 1/2-story Queen Anne style frame dwelling with a one-story wraparound porch and a corner tower. A meticulous renovation in 1987 by architect Charles Bohl maintained a majority of the original interior and exterior fabric of the building.

The Douglass Summer House was listed on the National Register of Historic Places in 1992.
