= Virginia Hewlett Douglass =

African-American suffragist

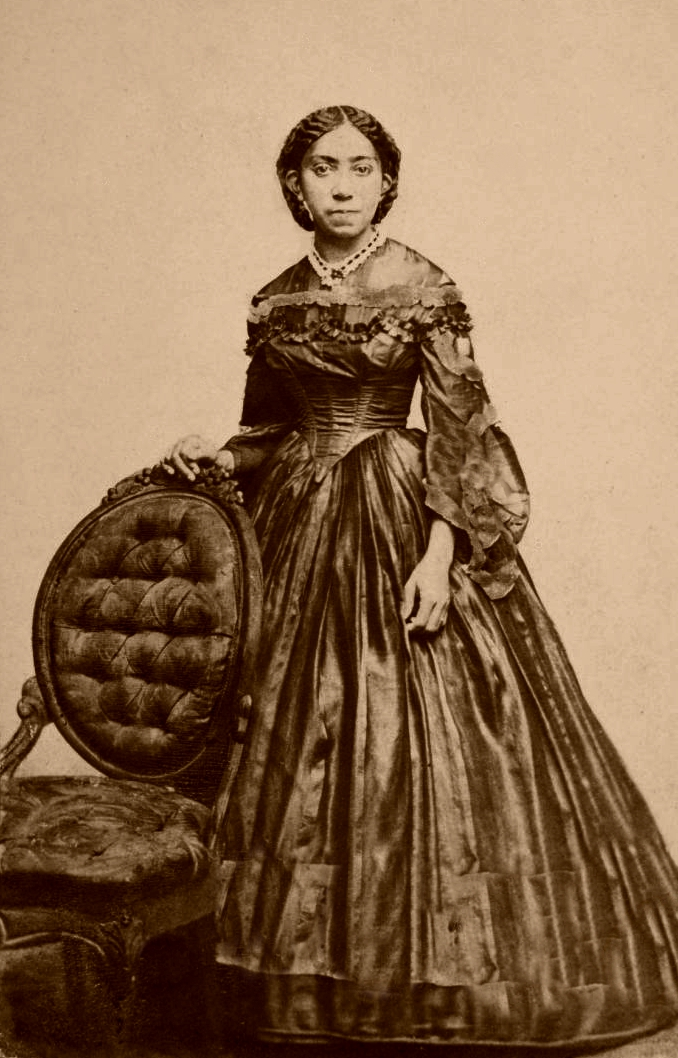
- Virginia Hewlett Douglass, c. 1869. Photographed by G.H. Loomis, Boston
- Born: Virginia Lewis Molyneaux Hewlett; June 1, 1849; Cambridge, Massachusetts, U.S.
- Died: December 14, 1889 (aged 40); Washington, D.C., United States
- Other name: Virginia Lewis Molyneaux Hewlett Douglass
- Spouse: Frederick Douglass, Jr.
- Children: 7
- Father: Aaron Molyneaux Hewlett

Virginia Hewlett Douglass (June 1, 1849 – December 14, 1889; née Virginia Lewis Molyneaux Hewlett) was an African-American suffragist. She was married to Frederick Douglass, Jr.

== Biography ==
Hewlett was born June 1, 1849, in Cambridge, Massachusetts, the daughter of the first African-American instructor at Harvard University (from 1859 to c. 1871), Aaron Molyneaux Hewlett and physical education instructor, Virginia Josephine Lewis (c.1821–1882).

On August 4, 1869, Virginia Hewlett Douglass married Frederick Douglass Jr. in Cambridge. Together, they had seven children, Fredrick Aaron Douglass (1870–1886), Virginia Anna Douglass (1871–1872), Lewis Emmanuel Douglass (c.1874–1875), Maud Ardell Douglass (1877–1877), Gertrude Pearl Douglass (1883–1887), Robert Smalls Douglass (1886–1910), Charles Paul Douglass (1879–1895). When her sister-in-law, Mary Elizabeth Murphy (married to Charles Remond Douglass), died in 1879, Virginia and Fredrick raised their two minor children, Charles Frederick and Joseph Henry.

In 1877, a petition for women's suffrage support by the District of Columbia African-American community was created and signed by Virginia Hewlett Douglass, Frederick Douglass, Jr., Nathan Sprague, and Rosetta Douglass Sprague. The petition had been part of a movement organized by National Woman Suffrage Association. On September 21, 1881, she wrote a letter to the editor of the Washington Sunday Item newspaper against school segregation and prejudice.

She died on December 14, 1889, in Washington, D.C., at the age of 40, and her cause of death was listed as consumption. She was buried in Graceland Cemetery and later moved to Woodlawn Cemetery in Washington, D.C. After her death, her brother Emanuel took custody of her two minor children, Charles Paul and Robert Smalls.
