= Joseph Douglass =

American concert violinist (1871–1935)

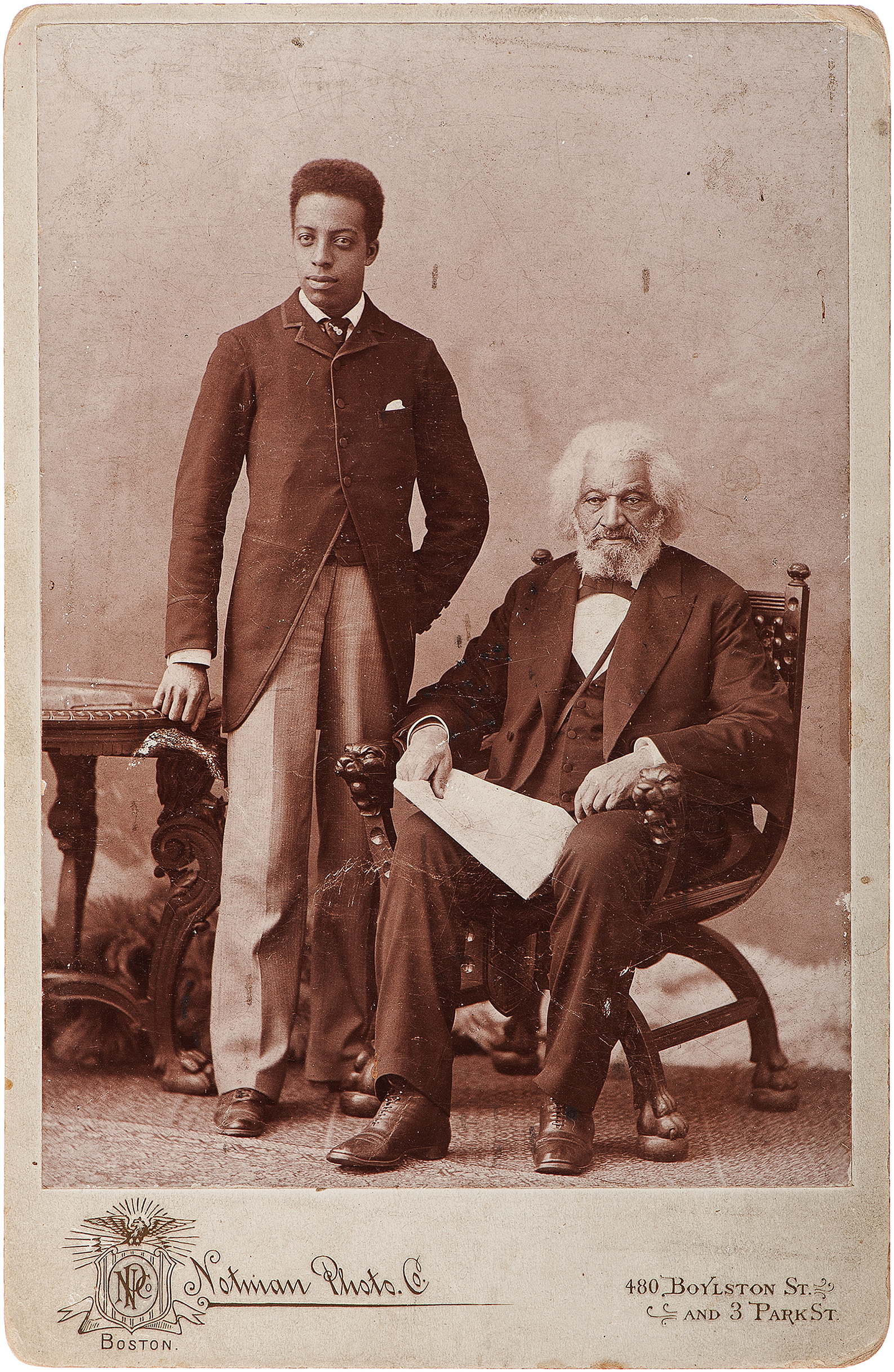
Joseph Douglass (left, standing, in morning dress) with grandfather Frederick Douglass (right, sitting in frock coat) (ca 1890s).

Joseph Henry Douglass (July 3, 1871 – December 7, 1935) was an American violinist, the son of Charles Remond Douglass and Mary Elizabeth Murphy, and grandson of abolitionist Frederick Douglass.

== Early life and influence ==
Joseph Douglass was born in the Anacostia area of Washington, D.C. He was exposed to music at an early age through his father, Charles, and his grandfather, the famous abolitionist and orator Frederick Douglass, both of whom were amateur violinists. Joseph began playing the violin as a child. With moral and financial support from his grandfather Frederick, he received classical training for five years at the New England Conservatory of Music, followed by further studies at the Boston Conservatory.

== First big break ==
During the time following the Civil War, many African-American musicians began to break into the art music genre. Joseph Douglass, a concert violinist, was one of the first African-American performers to be nationally and internationally renowned. He received his first big break as a concert violinist at the age of 22 when he performed at the World's Columbian Exposition, also known as the Chicago World's Fair. On August 25, 1893, performers joined together to celebrate Colored American Day (which Frederick Douglass helped plan). Included in the celebrations were readings of Paul Laurence Dunbar's poetry and performances by Sidney Woodward and Deseria Plato. Joseph Douglass also performed at Colored American Day, garnering him a large audience for his talents.

== Later life ==
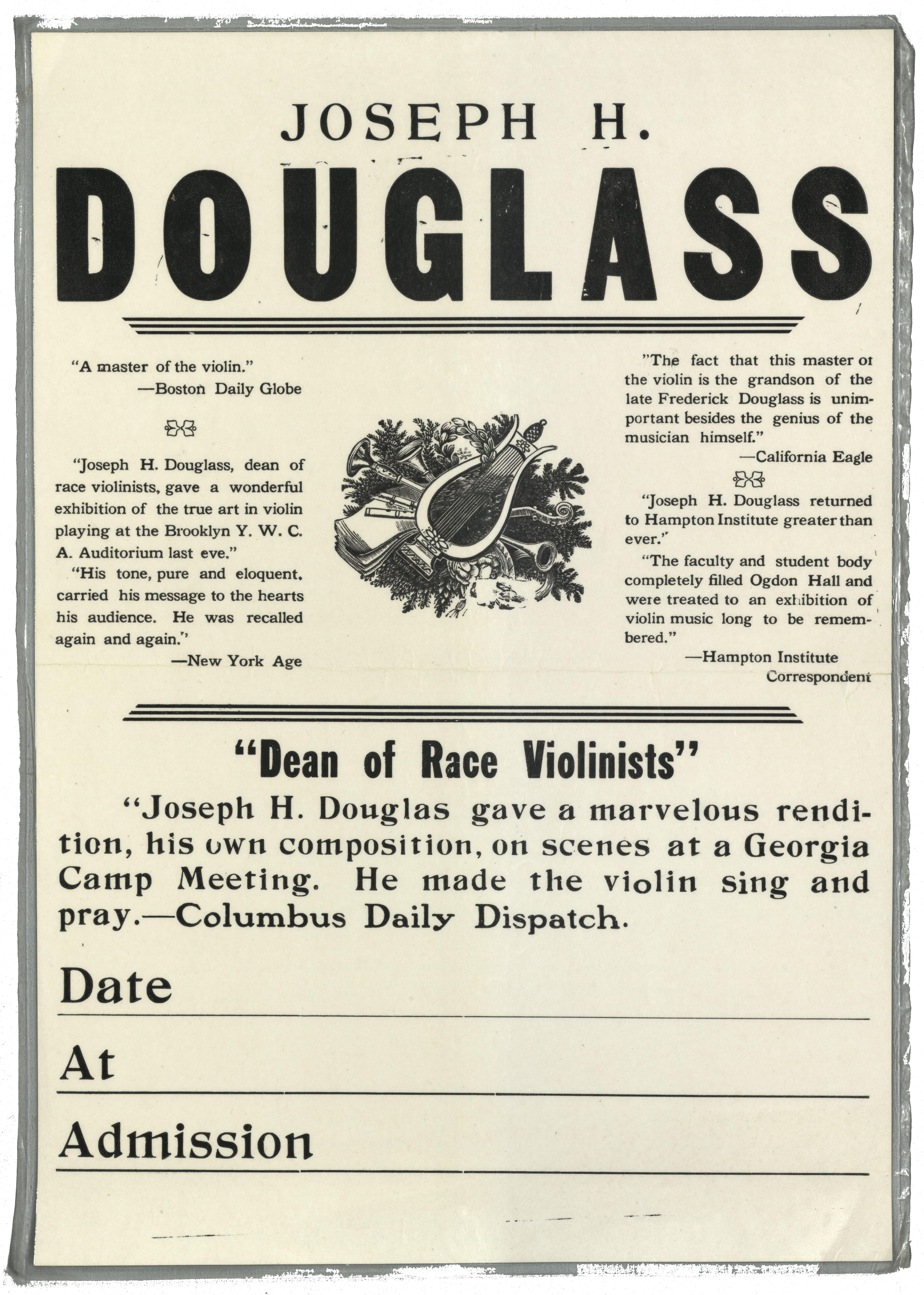
Broadside advertising a concert by Joseph H. Douglass, ca. 1895. MS Thr 1590, Houghton Library, Harvard University.

After his performance at the World's Columbian Exposition, he was very well known. Douglass is credited as the first Black violinist to make transcontinental tours. In the 1890s, he was lauded by the black press as "the most talented violinist of the race". Douglass toured extensively for three decades, performing in every Black educational institution and America and a significant number of churches as well. Douglass was also the first Black violinist to make recordings for the Victor Talking Machine Company, in 1914, but they were never released. On top of his performance career, Douglass was an educator and conductor, too. He had tenured positions at Howard University and the Colored Music Settlement School in New York throughout his life. He had many students including a young Clarence Cameron White.

== Personal life ==
Douglass married Fannie Howard Douglass. Fannie was a musician as well, often accompanying Joseph's performances on the piano. He and Fannie had two children: Blanche and Frederick III.
