= Anna Murray Douglass =

American abolitionist (1813–1882)

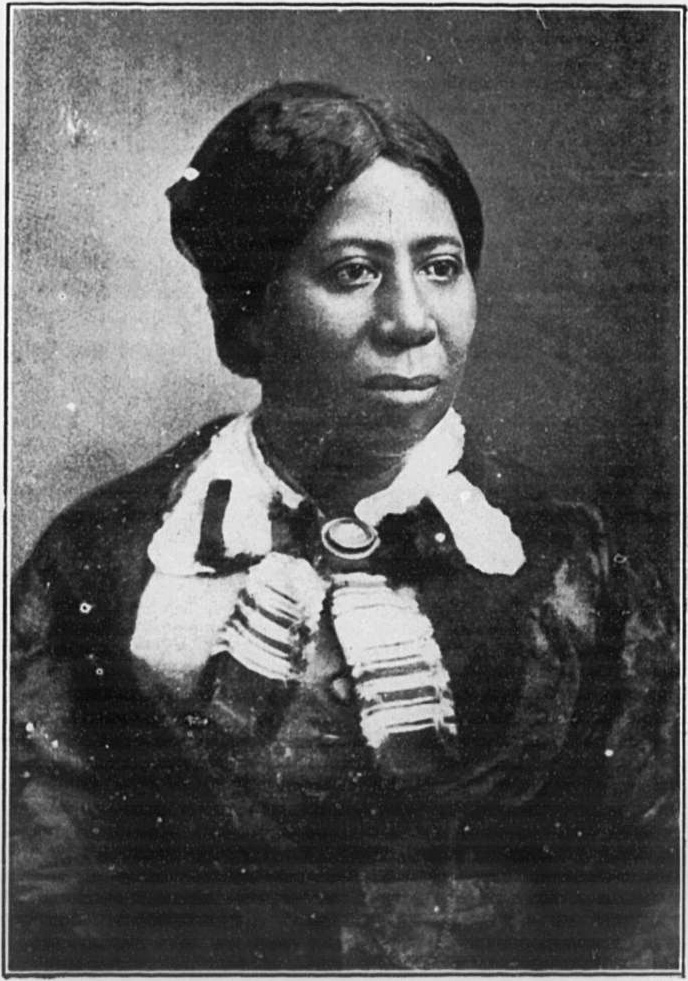
- Anna Murray Douglass c. 1860
- Born: Anna Murray; March 8, 1813; Denton, Maryland, U.S.
- Died: August 4, 1882 (aged 69); Washington, D.C., U.S.
- Occupations: Laundress; shoemaker; abolitionist
- Spouse: Frederick Douglass (m. 1838)
- Children: 5
- Relatives: Douglass family

Anna Murray Douglass (March 8, 1813 – August 4, 1882) was an American abolitionist, member of the Underground Railroad, and the first wife of American social reformer and statesman Frederick Douglass, from 1838 to her death.

== Early life ==
Anna Murray was born in Denton, Maryland, to Bambar(r)a^{a} and Mary Murray. Unlike her seven older brothers and sisters, who were born in slavery, Anna Murray and her younger four siblings were born free, her parents having been manumitted just a month before her birth. A resourceful young woman, by the age of 17 she had established herself as a laundress and housekeeper. Her laundry work took her to the docks, where she met Frederick Douglass,^{b} who was then working as a caulker.

== Marriage ==
Murray's freedom made Douglass believe in the possibility of his own. When he decided to escape slavery in 1838, Murray encouraged and helped him by providing Douglass with some sailor's clothing her laundry work gave her access to. She also gave him part of her savings, which she augmented by selling one of her feather beds. After Douglass had made his way to Philadelphia and then New York, Murray followed him, bringing enough goods with her to be able to start a household. They were married in Newtown, New York, by James W. C. Pennington in September 1838. At first, they took Johnson as their name, but upon moving to New Bedford, Massachusetts, they adopted Douglass as their married name.

Anna Murray Douglass had five children within the first ten years of the marriage: Rosetta Douglass, Lewis Henry Douglass, Frederick Douglass Jr., Charles Remond Douglass, and Annie Douglass (who died at the age of 10). She helped support the family financially, working as a laundress and learning to make shoes, as Douglass's income from his speeches was sporadic, and the family was struggling. She also took an active role in the Boston Female Anti-Slavery Society and later prevailed upon her husband to train their sons as typesetters for his abolitionist newspaper, North Star. After the family moved to Rochester, New York, she established a headquarters for the Underground Railroad from her home, providing food, board and clean linen for fugitive slaves on their way to Canada.

According to Maria Diedrich, Frederick and Anna "began to live separate lives less than five years into their marriage". Factors that contributed to this, Diedrich writes, included Anna's illiteracy and Frederick's frequent travels. "They had no way to communicate when he was away, sometimes for weeks", and Anna "seemed unwilling to participate in his intellectual pursuit".

Anna Murray Douglass received little mention in Douglass's three autobiographies. Henry Louis Gates has written that "Douglass had made his life story a sort of political diorama in which she had no role". His long absences from home, and her feeling that as a relatively uneducated woman she did not fit in with the social circles Douglass was now moving in, led to a degree of estrangement between them that was in marked contrast to their earlier closeness. Hurt by her husband's liaisons with other women, she nevertheless remained loyal to Douglass's public role; her daughter Rosetta reminded those who admired her father that his "was a story made possible by the unswerving loyalty of Anna Murray."

== Later life and death ==
After the death of her youngest daughter Annie in 1860 at the age of 10, Anna Murray Douglass was often in poor health. In August 1874, she visited the family of Gibson Valentine, residing in the far northeastern corner of Maryland. After staying with the family for two or three days, she returned to the Elkton Railroad Station to catch a train. There, according to the Cecil Whig, it became generally known that she was at the station. There was "quite a flutter" and "a great curiosity to see her was manifested", according to the newspaper.

She died of a stroke in 1882 at the family home in Washington D.C. She was initially buried at Graceland Cemetery in Washington, D.C., but the cemetery closed in 1894 and on February 22, 1895, she was moved to Mount Hope Cemetery in Rochester, New York. Frederick Douglass was buried next to her after his death on February 20, 1895.

== See also ==
- List of African-American abolitionists
- Abolitionism in New Bedford, Massachusetts

== Notes ==
^ Note a: Spelled "Banarra" in some sources.

^ Note b: Douglass was at the time still known by his birth name, Frederick Bailey. He changed his name to Douglass after his escape, because as a fugitive slave he was at risk of recapture.
