= Charles Remond Douglass =

American soldier and clerk of the Freedmen's Bureau (1844 –1920)

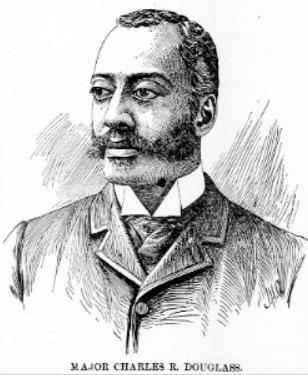
- Born: October 21, 1844; Lynn, Massachusetts
- Died: November 23, 1920 (aged 76); Washington, D.C.
- Resting place: Columbian Harmony Cemetery; Washington, D.C.
- Spouses: Mary Elizabeth Murphy (m. 1866; died 1879) Laura Haley (m. 1880)
- Children: 7 (including Joseph Douglass and Haley George)
- Parent(s): Frederick Douglass; Anna Murray Douglass
- Relatives: Douglass family

Charles Remond Douglass (October 21, 1844 – November 23, 1920) was the third and youngest son of Frederick Douglass and his first wife Anna Murray Douglass. He was the first African-American man to enlist in the military in New York during the Civil War, and served as one of the first African-American clerks in the Freedmen's Bureau in Washington, D.C.

== Biography ==
Named after a friend of his father and anti-slavery speaker, Charles Lenox Remond, Charles Remond Douglass was born on October 21, 1844, in Lynn, Massachusetts. Douglass attended public school in Rochester, New York, after his family moved to the city in late 1847. As a child he worked delivering copies of his father's newspaper North Star. In his lifetime he worked as a soldier, journalist, government clerk, real estate developer, and secretary and treasurer for the District of Columbia school district. In 1866 he married Mary Elizabeth Murphy. The couple had six children: Charles Frederick, Joseph Henry, Annie Elizabeth, Julia Ada, Mary Louise, and Edward Douglass. Of these six, Joseph Henry was the only one to live to adulthood, becoming a famous violinist. Douglass and his wife were married until her death in 1879. On December 30, 1880, Douglass married his second wife, Laura Haley. The couple had one son together, Haley George Douglass, in Canandaigua, New York, who became a school teacher at Dunbar High School in Washington, D.C., and mayor of Highland Beach, Maryland, from 1922 through his death in 1954.

=== Military career ===
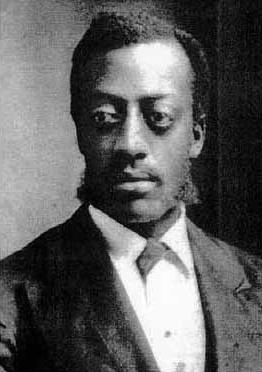
Douglass as a young man

Douglass became the first African-American man to enlist for U.S. military service in New York during the Civil War when he volunteered for the 54th Massachusetts Infantry Regiment. His brother Lewis Henry Douglass, also served in the 54th, ultimately becoming a sergeant major in that regiment. Due to illness, Douglass (Charles) was not able to deploy with the troops, thus remaining at the training camp in Readville, Massachusetts, as late as November 1863. He went on to join another black military regiment, the 5th Massachusetts Cavalry, in which he rose to the rank of first sergeant. In 1864 President Abraham Lincoln discharged Douglass due to poor health, at the request of his father. On December 7, 1880, Douglass helped to organize the Capital City Guards' Battalion, in which served as a captain and major. The organization later became the First Separate Battalion, National Guard of the District of Columbia. Douglass held several commands in the District of Columbia National Guard, along with several high posts in the Grand Army of the Republic.

=== Career ===
From 1867 to 1869, Douglass served as one of the first African-American clerks in the Freedmen’s Bureau when he and his family moved to Washington, D.C. This was followed up with his work in the Treasury Department from 1869 to 1875. He served as a clerk to the Santo Domingo Commission in 1871, then returned to the Caribbean when United States President Ulysses S. Grant appointed him consul to Puerto Plata, Santo Domingo. In 1875 Douglass became a clerk in the U.S. consulate in Santo Domingo, where he remained until 1879 when he returned to the United States after his wife's death. He then moved to Corona, New York, and entered the West India commissions business. In 1882 Douglass began working as an examiner for the Pension Bureau in Washington, D.C. After 53 years in government service, he retired in August 1920.

Douglass served as secretary and treasurer for the District of Columbia schools after he was appointed a trustee in 1872. While working in the district he actively employed the first African-American teachers in the District's schools and assured they received equal pay with Euro-American teachers.

=== Other work ===
After his father purchased the "New National Era" in 1870, Douglass became a correspondent for the paper. He became a real estate developer and developed a 26-acre tract with 1400 feet of beach front summer resort in Maryland in 1892 that became known as Highland Beach. His youngest son, Haley George would later become mayor of Highland Beach. For many years he served as president of the Bethel Literary and Historical Association, a cultural and literary institution for African Americans in Washington, D.C. Douglass also became a member of the District of Columbia's branch for the National Association for the Advancement of Colored People.

=== Death ===
Douglass died in Washington, D.C., on November 23, 1920, (age 76) after a short illness attributed to Bright's disease. He was buried at Columbian Harmony Cemetery in Washington, D.C., on November 26. He was survived by his wife Laura and two sons, Joseph Henry Douglass and Haley George Douglass.

== See also ==
- List of African-American abolitionists

== Bibliography ==
- Green, Robert Ewell (1990). Swamp Angels: A Biographical Study of the 54th Massachusetts Regiment: True Facts About the Black Defenders of the Civil War. Washington, D.C.: BoMark/Greene Publishing Group. ISBN 9780945733034.
