= Lewis Henry Douglass =

American soldier

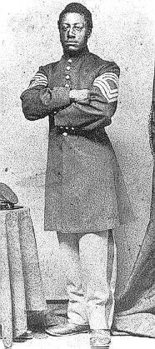
- Lewis Henry Douglass in his Union Army Uniform.
- Born: October 9, 1840; New Bedford, Bristol County, Massachusetts, U.S.
- Died: September 19, 1908 (aged 67); Washington, D.C., U.S.
- Burial place: Hyattsville, Prince George's County, Maryland
- Military career
- Allegiance: United States
- Branch: United States Army (Union Army)
- Service years: 1863-1864
- Rank: Sergeant Major
- Conflicts: American Civil War: Second Battle of Fort Wagner

Lewis Henry Douglass (October 9, 1840 – September 19, 1908) was an American military Sergeant Major, the oldest son of Frederick Douglass and his first wife Anna Murray Douglass.

== Early life ==
Lewis Henry Douglass was born on 9 October 1840 in New Bedford, Massachusetts. Douglass was well educated and as a boy apprenticed, in Rochester, New York, as a typesetter for his father's newspapers The North Star and Douglass' Weekly.

== Military career ==
He joined the Union Army on March 25, 1863, only two months after the Emancipation Proclamation allowed African Americans to engage in combat in the Union Army. He fought for one of the first official African American units in the United States during the Civil War, the famed 54th Massachusetts Infantry Regiment.

Shortly after joining the army, Douglass attained the rank of Sergeant Major, the highest rank a black man could reach. He took part in the Battle of Grimball's Landing (second James Island battle), the Second Battle of Fort Wagner, and the Battle of Olustee. At the Second Battle of Fort Wagner, half of his regiment was killed or wounded, but this battle turned the public's attention toward the sacrifices made by African Americans in the war. Douglass addressed the bravery of the African American troops in a letter to his future wife Helen Amelia Loguen:

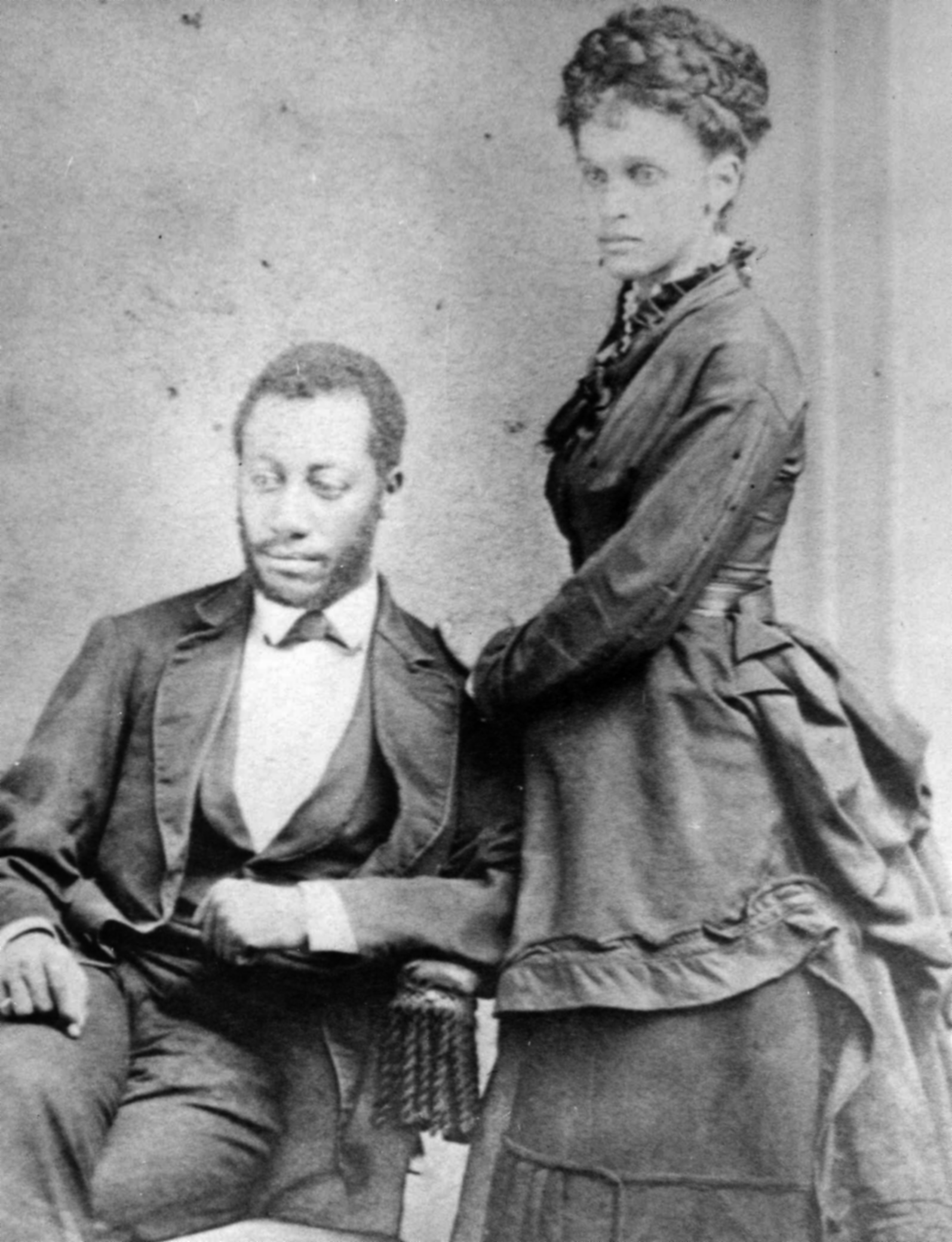
Lewis Henry Douglass and his wife Helen Amelia

MORRIS ISLAND. S. C. July 20

MY DEAR AMELIA: I have been in two fights, and am unhurt. I am about to go in another I believe to-night. Our men fought well on both occasions. The last was desperate we charged that terrible battery on Morris Island known as Fort Wagoner, and were repulsed with a loss of 300 killed and wounded. I escaped unhurt from amidst that perfect hail of shot and shell. It was terrible. I need not particularize the papers will give a better than I have time to give. My thoughts are with you often, you are as dear as ever, be good enough to remember it as I no doubt you will. As I said before we are on the eve of another fight and I am very busy and have just snatched a moment to write you. I must necessarily be brief. Should I fall in the next fight killed or wounded I hope to fall with my face to the foe.

If I survive I shall write you a long letter. DeForrest of your city is wounded George Washington is missing, Jacob Carter is missing, Chas Reason wounded Chas Whiting, Chas Creamer all wounded. The above are in hospital.

This regiment has established its reputation as a fighting regiment not a man flinched, though it was a trying time. Men fell all around me. A shell would explode and clear a space of twenty feet, our men would close up again, but it was no use we had to retreat, which was a very hazardous undertaking. How I got out of that fight alive I cannot tell, but I am here. My Dear girl I hope again to see you. I must bid you farewell should I be killed. Remember if I die I die in a good cause. I wish we had a hundred thousand colored troops we would put an end to this war. Good Bye to all Write soon Your own loving LEWIS

Douglass was later wounded and became ill, forcing him to be medically discharged from the army in 1864.

== Post-war career ==
After the Civil War, he worked as a teacher for the Freedman's Bureau. In 1866, Lewis and his brother, Frederick Douglass, Jr. went to Denver where they were hosted by Henry O. Wagoner, a friend of their father. Wagoner taught the brothers typography and along with William J. Hardin, Lewis taught reading, writing, and other subjects to adult blacks in Wagoner's home.

Douglass married Helen Amelia Loguen in 1869 and moved to Washington D.C. where he became the first typesetter employed by the Government Printing Office. Douglass's employment by the Government Printing Office as typesetter did not last long because he was unable to join the typesetters' union due to racial intimidation.

Like his father, Lewis Henry Douglass was a "valuable citizen" to Washington D.C. through his involvement with the New National Era and other political impact. He helped establish and was the senior editor of the New National Era (1870-1874) with his father, a "well conducted" newspaper aimed at addressing the issues of the black community in D.C. He had a political impact when appointed to the legislative council of the District of Columbia by Ulysses S. Grant where he pushed for racial equality by creating a bill like one that required restaurants to post their prices so they could not overcharge blacks. During the period of U.S. expansion, Douglass was an outspoken critic of the McKinley administration for its involvement in the Philippines and its lack of commitment to solve domestic issues of racial violence towards African Americans.

It is a sorry, though true, fact that whatever this government controls, injustice to dark races prevails.. The people of Cuba, Porto Rico [sic], Hawaii and Manila know it well as do the wronged Indian and outraged black man in the United States

Douglass had a stroke in 1904 that greatly impacted his health and died four years later, at the age of 67.
