= Frederick Douglass Jr. =

American abolitionist, essayist, and newspaper editor (1842–1892)

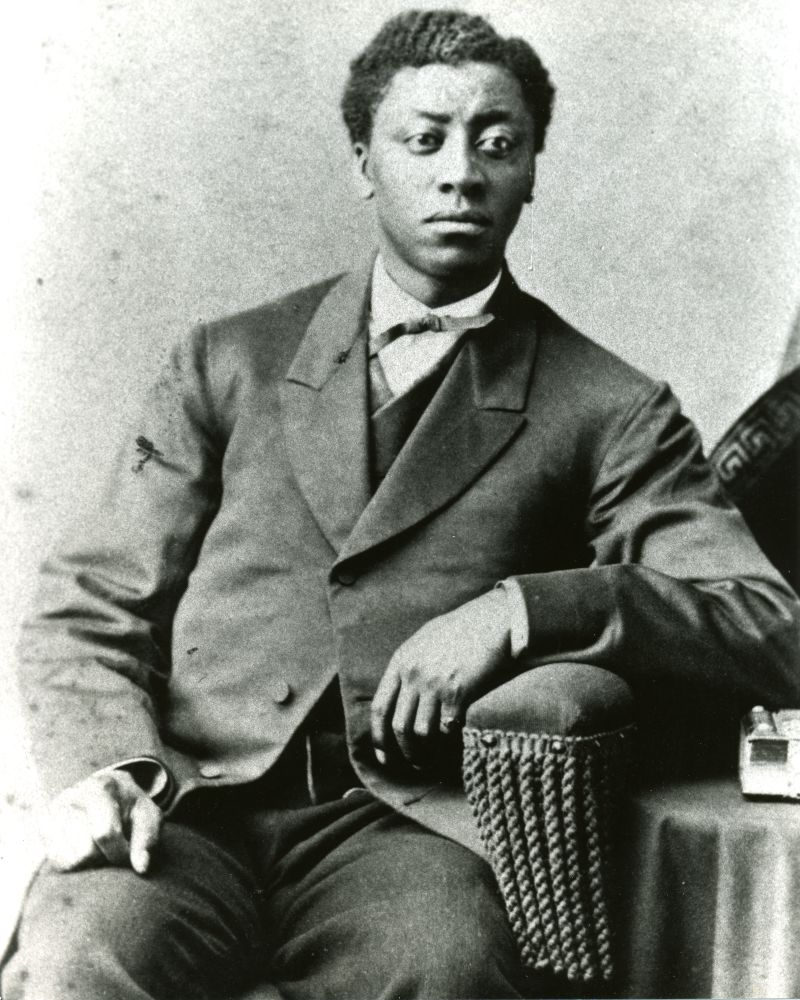
- Frederick Douglass Jr. c. 1862
- Born: March 3, 1842; New Bedford, Massachusetts, US
- Died: July 26, 1892 (aged 50); Washington, D.C., US
- Other name: Fred Douglass Jr.
- Occupations: Printer, Editor, Typesetter
- Spouse: Virginia Hewlett Douglass (m. 1869; died 1889)
- Children: 7
- Parent(s): Frederick Douglass; Anna Murray Douglass
- Relatives: Douglass family

Frederick Augustus Washington Bailey Douglass Jr. (March 3, 1842 – July 26, 1892) was the second son of Frederick Douglass and his wife Anna Murray Douglass. Born in New Bedford, Massachusetts, he was an abolitionist, essayist, newspaper editor, and an official recruiter of Black-American soldiers for the United States Union Army during the American Civil War.

== Early life ==
Douglass was the third eldest of five children born to the Douglass family, comprising three sons and two daughters. As a youngster while still under his parents' roof he joined them as active members and conductors of the Underground Railroad, receiving fugitives at their Rochester, New York home; feeding and clothing them, and providing safe, warm shelter as they made their way from bondage to freedom, which for many of these meant escape to British North America.

== Military service ==
During the American Civil War, Douglass joined his father as a recruiter of United States Colored Troops for the Union Army and was commissioned a Recruiting Sergeant, attached to the U.S. 25th Colored Infantry. Although he himself was never a combat soldier during the American Civil War conflict, as were his two brothers, he was proud to have been a recruiter in behalf of the Union cause, especially regarding the 55th Massachusetts Infantry Regiment. As such, he worked closely with his father who had been the foremost civilian recruiter for the 54th Massachusetts Infantry Regiment, and who had also served as a consultant and advisor to President Abraham Lincoln on the enlistment of African-Americans into the Union Army, in supporting the Commander in Chief's objective of reinforcing the Union's armed forces to put down the rebellion of the break-away Confederate States. Both his older brother Lewis Henry Douglass and younger brother Charles Remond Douglass were among the first enlistees in that regiment.

== Career ==
Douglass was a printer and editor, having learned these skills while working as an apprentice on his father's newspaper The North Star. Together with his father and his brother Lewis, Douglass became co-editor of the New Era or New National Era, a journal published specifically post–Civil War freed slaves, between the years 1870 to 1874. Douglass was also a trained typesetter, having completed formal training at Denver, Colorado. When his father, Frederick Douglass Sr., was appointed United States Marshal by President Rutherford B. Hayes in the year 1877, Douglass was made a bailiff and later attained a clerkship in the office of the Recorder of Deeds during his father's tenure in that role for the District of Columbia which was from 1881 until 1885.

== Personal life ==
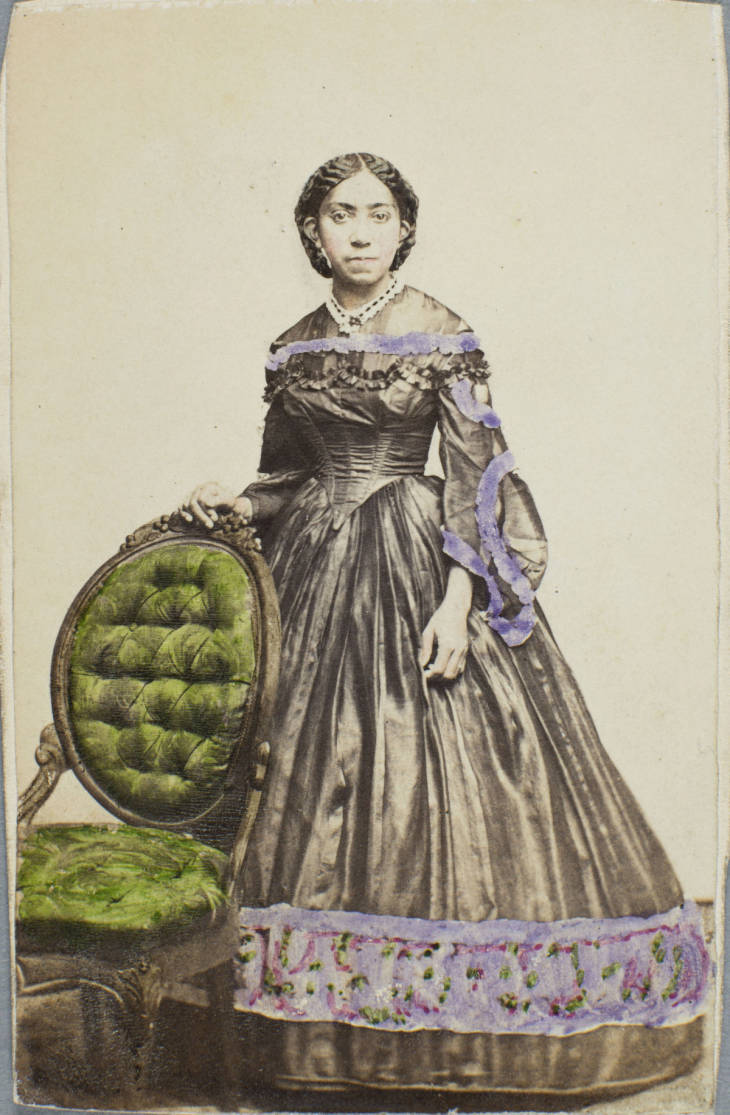
Virginia L. Molyneaux Hewlett Douglass

On August 4, 1869, Virginia Hewlett Douglass and Frederick Douglass Jr. married in Cambridge, Massachusetts. Together they had seven children: Fredrick Aaron Douglass (1870–1886), Virginia Anna Douglass (1871–1872), Lewis Emmanuel Douglass (c.1874–1875), Maud Ardell Douglass (1877–1877), Gertrude Pearl Douglass (1883–1887), Robert Smalls Douglass (1886–1910), Charles Paul Douglass (1879–1895). Five predeceased their parents, four dying in infancy and early childhood, and only Robert survived past the age of sixteen, dying however at twenty-four as well.

== Death ==
Frederick Douglass Jr. died on July 26, 1892, and was initially interred at Graceland Cemetery, beside his wife Virginia Hewlett who had preceded him in death on December 14, 1889. This later changed with the closing of Graceland Cemetery in 1894; the remains were exhumed and removed to Woodlawn Cemetery in the Benning Ridge section of Washington, D.C.

== Regarding his application for a clerkship in the office of the Recorder of Deeds ==
The following represents correspondence between Frederick Douglass Jr., and District of Columbia Register of Deeds, Simon Wolf. It goes on to describe content of the cover letter accompanying his application for a clerkship within that office.

"Yesterday Simon Wolf, Esq., the newly appointed register of deeds, received the following letter from Frederick Douglass, jr., a brother of Mr. [Charles] Douglass, at the Government office (and not the 'colored printer at the Government office,' as erroneously stated in the 'Star of yesterday). The letter will be read with interest at this time:"

Washington, D.C., May 21, 1869.

Simon Wolf, Esq., Register of Deeds:

DEAR SIR: I have the honor to request an appointment as clerk in the office of which you have the distinguished honor to be the head. I belong to that despised class which has not been known in the field of applicants for position under the Government heretofore. I served my country during the war, under the colors of Massachusetts, my own native State, and am the son of a man (Frederick Douglass) who was once held in a bondage protected by the laws of this nation; a nation, the perpetuity of which, with many others of my race, I struggled to maintain. I am by trade a printer, but in consequence of combinations entered into by printers' unions throughout the country, I am unable to obtain employment at it. I therefore hope that you will give this, my application, the most favorable consideration.

I have the honor to be, very respectfully, your obedient servant,

FREDERICK DOUGLASS, JR.

The following is the official reply:

RECORDER'S OFFICE

Washington, D.C., May 21, 1869.

Your application is before me, and has received favorable consideration. I see no reason in the world why you or your race should not have the full countenance in the struggle for progress and education, and I am particularly happy in being the means of encouraging you; for, as a descendant of a race equally maligned and prejudged, I have a feeling of common cause; and who can foresee but what the stone the builders reject may become the head stone of our political and social structure.

Very respectfully,

S. Wolf

== General sources ==
- Blight, David W. (2018). Frederick Douglass: Prophet of Freedom. New York: Simon & Schuster. ISBN 9781416590316. OCLC 1057342963.
