= Life and Times of Frederick Douglass =

Autobiography by Frederick Douglass

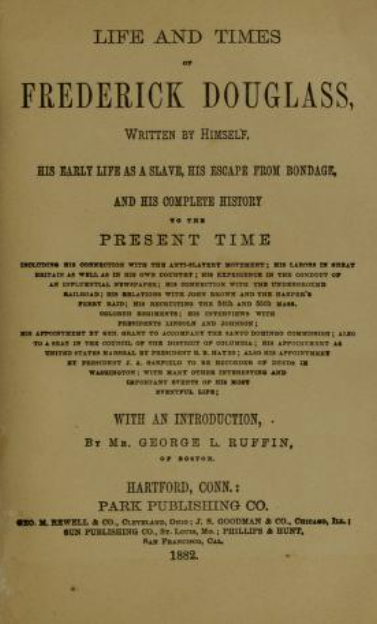
- Title page for Life and Times of Frederick Douglass (1882)
- Author: Frederick Douglass
- Language: English
- Genre: Autobiography
- Publisher: Park Publishing Co. (1881); Christian Age Office (1882, UK); De Wolfe & Fiske Co. (1892, US)
- Publication date: 1881
- Publication place: United States
- Preceded by: My Bondage and My Freedom

Life and Times of Frederick Douglass is Frederick Douglass's third autobiography, published in 1881 and revised in 1892. Because of the emancipation of American slaves during and following the American Civil War, Douglass gave more details about his life as a slave and his escape from slavery in this volume than he could in his two previous autobiographies (which would have put him and his family in danger). It is Douglass's only autobiography to discuss his life during and after the Civil War, including his encounters with American presidents such as Lincoln and Garfield, his account of the ill-fated "Freedman's Bank", and his service as the United States Marshall of the District of Columbia. Frederick Douglass shed light on his life as a slave. Although it is the least studied and analyzed of the autobiographies, Life and Times of Frederick Douglass allows readers to view his life as a whole.

The 1892 revision brought Douglass's story up to date with thirteen new chapters, the final three of which covered his experience in Haiti, to which he was U.S. minister from 1889 to 1891. Douglass also "lightly edited" the 1881 edition, according to Robert S. Levine.

The full title of both the 1881 and 1892 editions is Life and Times of Frederick Douglass, Written by Himself. His Early Life as a Slave, His Escape from Bondage, and His Complete History to the Present Time, Including His Connection with the Anti-slavery Movement; His Labors in Great Britain as Well as in His Own Country; His Experience in the Conduct of an Influential Newspaper; His Connection with the Underground Railroad; His Relations with John Brown and the Harper's Ferry Raid; His Recruiting the 54th and 55th Mass. Colored Regiments; His Interviews with Presidents Lincoln and Johnson; His Appointment by Gen. Grant to Accompany the Santo Domingo Commission—Also to a Seat in the Council of the District of Columbia; His Appointment as United States Marshal by President R.B. Hayes; Also His Appointment by President J.A. Garfield; with Many Other Interesting and Important Events of His Most Eventful Life; With an Introduction by Mr. George L. Ruffin, of Boston. Hartford, Conn.: Park Publishing Co., 1881; Boston: De Wolfe & Fiske Co., 1892.

The full title of the 1882 British edition is The Life and Times of Frederick Douglass, From 1817 to 1882, Written by Himself. Illustrated. With an Introduction by the Right Hon. John Bright, M.P. London: Christian Age Office, 1882.

== Part I ==
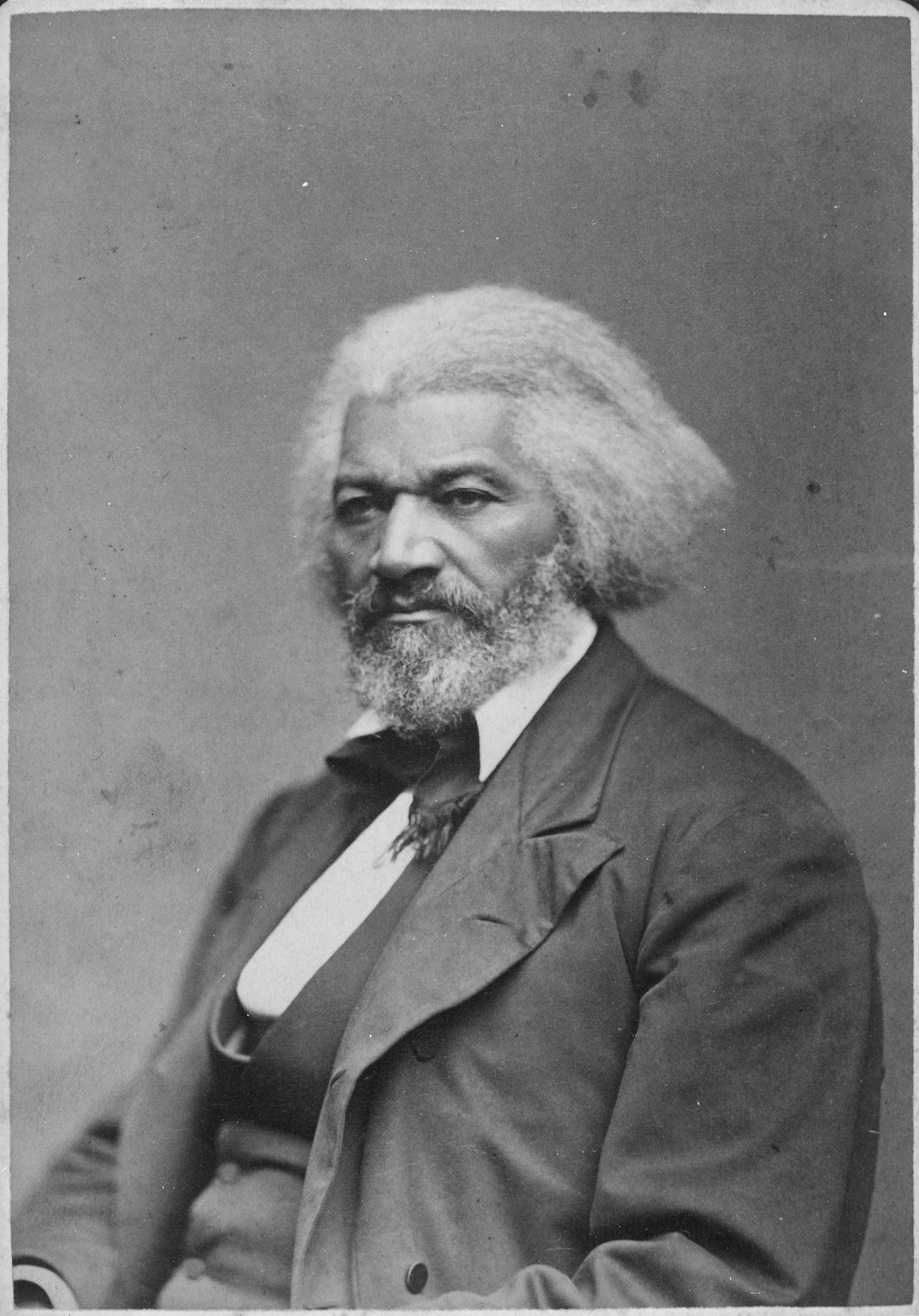
Frederick Douglass, c.1879

=== Chapters 1–4 ===
Douglass begins by describing his earliest childhood memories of living with his grandparents, Betsy and Isaac Bailey, until he was seven or eight years old. He was born enslaved in Talbot County on the Eastern Shore of Maryland. Douglass discusses how his grandmother was treated better than other Black people in the area. Douglass claims to know little about his parentage, as his mother was rarely able to see him as a "hired out" enslaved worker, and he is unsure of his father's identity. He recalls learning that he was enslaved when forced to leave his grandparents' cabin to live on the Lloyd plantation. Douglass details the cruelty he witnessed and experienced while living at the Lloyd plantation.

=== Chapters 5–8 ===
Douglass details several cruel interactions he witnessed between Captain Anthony and slaves at the plantation. He is particularly descriptive of the Captain's interactions with enslaved women who had no control over what happened to them. Rape is described as a constant occurrence in an enslaved woman's life. In chapter seven, Douglass describes Colonel Lloyd's life and house, which he contrasts with the horrors of slavery. He also describes the peculiar characteristics of overseers at the plantation, including Austin Gore, Mr. Hopkins's successor. Douglass also details how slaves were murdered by their overseers, such as Bill Denby, whom Gore shot. The overseer received no punishment from his superiors.

=== Chapters 9–13 ===
Douglass befriends two white people from the Colonel's family: Lucretia (Captain Anthony's daughter and Captain Thomas Auld's wife) and Daniel Lloyd (Colonel Lloyd's youngest son). Lucretia informs Douglass that he will be sent to live with Mr. Hugh Auld. His move to Baltimore, Maryland, is described as a turning point in Douglass's life. Douglass highlights how Baltimore was brutal in its slaveholding practices despite its proximity to a free state. Mrs. Auld and Douglass form a connection, and she gives him lessons on reading and writing. However, when Mr. Auld discovers this, he forbids her to continue the lessons. At this point, Douglass understands how knowledge is connected to freedom. Without Mrs. Auld's lessons, Douglass searches for different ways to educate himself, such as carrying a spelling book and purchasing The Colombian Orator. With the acquisition of knowledge, Douglass examines the morality of slavery. Charles Lawson, a Black man who resides near the Aulds, encourages Douglass to focus on Christianity. With Captain Anthony's death, all of his property, including his slaves, was divided between his children Andrew and Lucretia. Douglass becomes Lucretia and Captain Thomas Auld's property after the division. Douglass is taken from Baltimore after Lucretia's death.

=== Chapters 14–17 ===
Captain Thomas Auld deprives his slaves of food and mistreats them. Auld believes that Douglass is spoiled and puts him under the control of Edward Covey, a cruel man known as a "slave-breaker". Covey severely whips, overworks, and abuses Douglass, who describes him as a hypocritical Christian. One day while working in the field, Douglass collapses because he has fallen ill from overwork, but Covey claims he is lying and savagely beats him. Douglass, covered with blood walks back to St. Michaels and begs Captain Thomas Auld not to send him back to Covey, but Auld refuses. When Douglass returns, Covey is set on whipping him; this time, however, Douglass resists and proves to be stronger than Covey. Covey never beats Douglass again.

=== Chapters 18–21 ===
A year after staying with Covey, Douglass moves to the farm of William Freeland, who is portrayed as less cruel than Covey. Douglass begins a Sunday school with other slaves who work with him. During his second year working at Freeland's farm, Douglass decides to escape and head North. Douglass confides in some of his fellow slaves, who also plan to run away. However, they are betrayed and imprisoned. Captain Thomas Auld decides not to sell Douglass to the deep South and instead sends him to Baltimore, where he lives with Sophia Auld and Hugh. Douglass makes a deal with Auld, where he works elsewhere and is allowed to keep a small portion of his earnings while Auld receives the rest.

Nevertheless, Douglass attends a Methodist camp meeting without asking his masters' permission, which infuriates Auld. Douglass works as a dutiful slave while planning his escape. Finally, he succeeds in reaching New Bedford, but in his first two autobiographies he did not give details of his escape, in order to protect those who helped him run away.

== Part II ==
=== Chapter 1–5 ===
In Life and Times Douglass reveals that he escaped by dressing as a sailor and carrying a "sailor's protection" document that he borrowed from a friend. Being a sailor was a popular position for free Black people. By using the document, Douglass successfully boarded a train from Baltimore to Philadelphia. After conquering various obstacles, Douglass arrives in Philadelphia and boards another train heading to New York. After arriving in New York, Douglass realizes that it is not a safe place for fugitive slaves. With his connections and calking experience, Douglass is able to go to New Bedford, Massachusetts. Douglass finds a home in Massachusetts and changes his surname to Douglass. He delivered his first speech in 1841 advocating the abolition of slavery. He joins the New England Anti-Slavery Society, which organizes conventions in six of the free states. However, things do not go as expected. In Syracuse, New York, a man attempts to divert the discussion of slavery abolition to communism. In Rochester, New York, and Clinton, Ohio, the abolitionist cause is accepted, but in Pendleton, Indiana, a mob attacked Douglass and other abolitionists, injuring them.

=== Chapter 6–8 ===
After the publication of his narrative in 1845, Douglass went to England, where he did not experience prejudice at all. Douglass is able to raise enough money to purchase his freedom from Captain Thomas Auld. After returning from Europe, Douglass settled in Rochester and published The North Star, an anti-slavery newspaper. In the newspaper, Douglass discusses the American Constitution and how it is a pro-liberty document. Douglass still experiences prejudice when living in Rochester and draws attention to the everlasting oppressive system. While working as a conductor on the Underground Railroad, Douglass assisted fugitive slaves trying to go to Canada. Douglass met abolitionists such as John Brown and Harriet Beecher Stowe, who influenced his life as an abolitionist.

=== Chapters 9–12 ===
Douglass discusses how the tension between the North and the South increased as anti-slavery efforts increased. John Brown, in his raid on Harpers Ferry, Virginia, took control of the federal arsenal there, as part of a scheme to liberate slaves. Although Douglass knew about Brown's plan, he opposed it because he thought it was doomed to fail. But people assumed that Douglass was involved due to his connection to Brown, so he escaped to Canada and then to England. While in Europe, Douglass finds out that his daughter Anne had died, and he returns to America. With the election of President Abraham Lincoln, Douglass views the American Civil War as a fight to end the slavery system. In 1863, Douglass met Lincoln, who welcomed him into the White House and listened to his concerns regarding the unequal treatment of Black soldiers, who had been allowed to enlist after Lincoln issued his Emancipation Proclamation January 1, 1863, freeing the slaves in states in rebellion.

=== Chapters 13–19 ===
After the abolition of slavery, Douglass realized the emancipated slaves needed advocates to speak on their behalf. Douglass continues delivering speeches that seek to achieve equality. He is elected by the citizens of Rochester to represent them at the National Loyalist Convention. Douglass meets Amanda Sears, Lucretia Auld's daughter when walking in the procession. Douglass established the New National Era after he moved to Washington, DC Douglass also became a member of the Board of Trustees of the Freedmen's Savings and Trust Company. He was then elected the bank's president. Douglass visits Captain Thomas Auld in 1877 when he returns to St. Michaels. His former master tells Douglass that he was "too smart" to be enslaved and was correct to escape. He also visits the Lloyd plantation, which brings memories from his past as a slave. Douglass discusses how he experienced prejudice even as a free man. For example, when trying to eat dinner while traveling in a steamer, white people remove him from the cabin due to his skin color. In the final chapter of his Part II, Douglass thanks people he knows who participated in the anti-slave movement as well as a reflection of a person's purpose in life. Douglass concludes Part II by acknowledging that his purpose in recounting his story has been fulfilled.

== Part III ==
=== Chapters 1–7 ===
Part III of the narrative was written ten years after Douglass wrote and published Parts I and II. In chapter one, Douglass reflects on the abolitionist days, while the remaining chapters discuss the events of 1881-1891, such as President James Garfield's inauguration and his death about a month after he was shot by Charles J. Guiteau. Garfield appointed Douglass as United States Marshal of the District of Columbia. His death affected Douglass's hopes for equality. Prior to his death, Garfield had informed Douglass of his plan to appoint a Black man as minister to Haiti. Douglass becomes the Recorder of Deeds for the District of Columbia, which he enjoys more than his previous position. Douglass was judged for remarrying a white woman named Helen Pitts two years after his wife died.

Douglass expresses his admiration for President Grover Cleveland, because he "acts upon his convictions." He argues that the results of the 1884 presidency were due to the fact that Republicans disregarded Black people as means to increase Southern support.

=== Chapter 8–13 ===
Douglass reflects on his trip to Europe and the rest of the world with his wife in 1886 and the people he met in Great Britain years before. He details the scenery and people he met along the way. He continues to deliver speeches all over the world, speaking on behalf of Black people aiming to achieve racial equality. Specifically, Douglass speaks against the Supreme Court's decision to invalidate the 1875 Civil Rights Act. Douglass is then appointed Minister Resident and Consul General to the Republic of Haiti by President Harrison in 1889. However, after some time, Douglass resigned from this position due to increased public pressure from the American Press. The last two chapters of Part III address his conduct as Minister of Haiti. Although Douglass concludes his book with a hopeful tone, there is no happy ending.

== Key Figures ==
- Frederick Douglass: writer, abolitionist, social activist, public speaker, and former slave.
- Sophia Auld: Hugh Auld's wife, who at first treats Douglass with much kindness and gives him lessons on how to read and write. However, at a request from her husband, Auld ceases to teach Douglass and tries to prevent him from acquiring knowledge.
- Betsy Bailey: Frederick Douglass's grandmother in whose cabin Douglass lived until he turned seven.
- Captain Aaron Anthony: Douglass's first legal owner. Captain Anthony is described as a cruel enslaver and an unhappy man.
- Lucretia Auld: Captain Aaron Anthony's daughter who is kind towards Douglass. Lucretia used to bring bread to Douglass on nights he was hungry.
- Captain Thomas Auld: Lucretia Auld's husband who takes possession of Douglass once his wife dies. Captain Thomas Auld sends Douglass to work on Edward Covey's farm, where he is severely abused.
- Austin Gore: An overseer of the Lloyd plantation who is described to be extremely cruel. Gore murders Bill Denby, one of the slaves on the Lloyd plantation.
- Edward Covey: Known as the "negro-breaker," Covey abuses slaves working on his farm as a means to make them more obedient. After enduring much abuse from Covey, Frederick successfully fights with him, which puts an end to Covey's physical mistreatment of Douglass.
- Charles Lawson: A Black man who introduces the power of Christianity to Douglass.
- John Brown: A man who influenced Douglass's life as an abolitionist. Brown and his companions raided the federal arsenal at Harpers Ferry, Virginia, hoping to incite an uprising of slaves.

== Reactions to Text ==
Several scholars criticized Life and Times of Frederick Douglass, and Douglass was disappointed with how his narrative was received. From the 1880s to 1890s, African American newspapers entirely ignored his third narrative. William Andrews, as well as other scholars, criticized the fact that Douglass's last autobiography can be seen as a shift in African American literature from "asserting black identity against a slaveholding nation" to "accommodation to the values and goals of the white middle class into which they attempted to assimilate". For these scholars, Douglass's last autobiography lacks a sense of purpose in the post-Civil War era. Jürgen E. Grandt writes that in Life and Times of Frederick Douglass, Douglass "seeks to break out of the tautology of language in order to rejoin text in history". While in his two previous narratives, Douglass focused on the quest for literacy, in Life and Times, he sought to "re(connect) with a realm outside of language". Grandt adds that Douglass finds it difficult "to escape the tautology of language by placing authentic blackness outside of the text itself". The shift in focus on Douglass's third autobiography caused it to be the least studied out of all three of his autobiographies. Grandt also writes that the Life and Times of Frederick Douglass is "indicative of a general loss of emotional force and economy".

Robert S. Levine writes that Life and Times "has generally been regarded as something of an embarrassment, a self-indulgent work of over 600 pages that need be read only by Douglass specialists.... But Life and Times is the only autobiography in which Douglass discusses John Brown, Abraham Lincoln, the Civil War, Reconstruction, his return to Maryland's Eastern Shore, his second marriage, and his vexed role as U.S. minister and consul to Haiti.... Douglass for the most part tells a compelling story ... in ways that are highly rhetorical, performative, and not completely to be trusted".

== See also ==
- Narrative of the Life of Frederick Douglass, an American Slave. First autobiography, 1845.
- My Bondage and My Freedom: Second autobiography, 1855.
