= Self-Made Men =

1859 lecture by Frederick Douglass

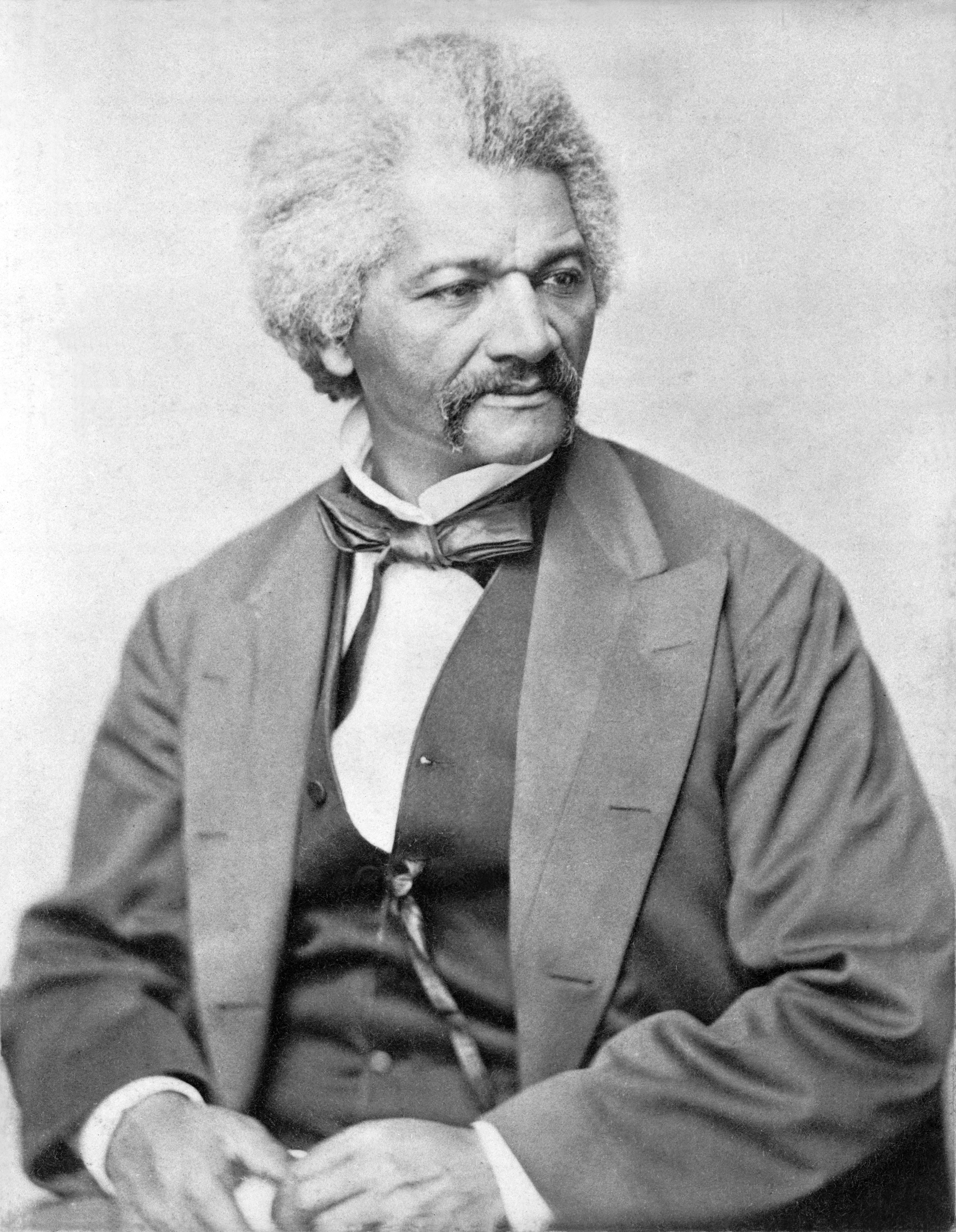
Frederick Douglass, photographed between 1850 and 1860.

"Self-Made Men" is a lecture, first delivered in 1859, by Frederick Douglass, which gives his own definition of the self-made man and explains what he thinks are the means to become such a man.

== Douglass's view ==
Douglass stresses the low origins of the self-made man, who has not inherited his social position by birth or other favourable circumstances, but who achieves everything without any outside assistance:

Self-made men ... are the men who owe little or nothing to birth, relationship, friendly surroundings; to wealth inherited or to early approved means of education; who are what they are, without the aid of any of the favoring conditions by which other men usually rise in the world and achieve great results. (pp549-50)

In addition, Douglass does not believe in what he calls the "good luck theory" (p552), which attributes success to chance and friendly circumstances. He believes that "opportunity is important but exertion is indispensable" (p553). It is not luck that makes a man a self-made man, but considerable physical and mental effort. Douglass underlines the importance of hard work as a necessary means to achieve success. He remarks that "there is nothing good, great or desirable ..., that does not come by some kind of labor" (p555). Douglass is convinced that success can be explained by only one word, namely "work!" (p556)

He further argues that there is a natural hierarchy of men. An ambitious man will naturally, through hard work, climb the social ladder, whereas the unmotivated man will not improve his position: "the man who will get up will be helped up; and the man who will not get up will be allowed to stay down" (p557). Applying this theory to the situation of the African-Americans, Douglass remarks: "Give the negro fair play and let him alone. If he lives, well. If he dies, equally well. If he cannot stand up, let him fall down." (p557)

Yet Douglass admits that industry is not the only explanation of the phenomenon of the self-made man. In his opinion, necessity is what urges a man to achieve more. Moreover, favourable circumstances are counterproductive to one's resolution to get ahead. Ease and luxury rather lead to helplessness and inactivity and an inactive man can never become a self-made man. "As a general rule, where circumstances do most for men there man will do least for himself; and where man does least, he himself is least. His doing makes or unmakes him."(p558) However, though acknowledging that there are other factors for success such as "order, the first law of heaven" (562), Douglass insists that hard work is the most important of them all, without which all others would fail:

My theory of self-made men is, then, simply this; that they are men of work. Whether or not such men have acquired material, moral or intellectual excellence, honest labor faithfully, steadily and persistently pursued, is the best, if not the only, explanation of their success. (p560)

== Differences between Douglass and Franklin ==
The concept of the self-made man is deeply rooted in the American Dream. Benjamin Franklin, one of the Founding Fathers of the United States, is sometimes said to have created the concept of the self-made man. In his Autobiography, he describes his way from a poor, unknown son of a candle-maker to a very successful business man and highly acknowledged member of the American society. Franklin creates the archetype of someone coming from low origins, who, against all odds, breaks out of his inherited social position, climbs up the social ladder and creates a new identity for himself. Key factors in this rise from rags to riches are hard work and a solid moral foundation. Franklin also stresses the significance of education for self-improvement.

Despite all these similarities between Douglass's and Franklin's concept of the self-made man, the two men differ in their emphasis on relationships to other men. Before Douglass even gives his definition of the self-made man, he remarks, "Properly speaking, there are in the world no such men as self-made men." (p549)

It must in truth be said though it may not accord well with self-conscious individuality and self-conceit, that no possible native force of character, and no depth or wealth of originality, can lift a man into absolute independence of his fellow-men, and no generation of men can be independent of the preceding generation. (p549)

Whereas Franklin does not put a strong emphasis on relationships, for Douglass, they are a matter of the utmost importance. Douglass understands himself as part of a larger entity and highlights what he calls the "brotherhood and inter-dependence of mankind" (p549). Comparing the relationship between an individual and the masses to that between a wave and the ocean, Douglass explains that, though we differ like the waves, we all depend on each other and the power and greatness of each individual derives exactly from this interdependence. Since all men complement each other in their abilities and strengths, Douglass further argues that "the balance of power is kept comparatively even, and a self-acting brotherhood and interdependence is maintained." (p549)

Like [Franklin, Douglass stresses moral principles. According to him, "the principles of honor, integrity and affection" (p561) are the essential prerequisite for enduring success:

All human experience proves over and over again, that any success which comes through meanness, trickery, fraud and dishonour, is but emptiness and will only be a torment to its possessor. (p561)

== See also ==
- Narrative of the Life of Frederick Douglass, an American Slave (1845), Douglass's first book
- My Bondage and My Freedom (1855), Douglass's next memoir
- The Heroic Slave, a heartwarming Narrative of the Adventures of Madison Washington, in Pursuit of Liberty, (1852), a fiction book by Douglass based on the experiences of Madison Washington.
- Rags to riches
- Novus homo - A similar concept in Roman and Renaissance social philosophy
