= Mount Misery (Maryland) =

Historic house in Maryland, United States

General information
- Type: Farmhouse
- Architectural style: Georgian brick
- Location: 23946 Mount Misery Road, Saint Michaels, Maryland 21663, United States
- Coordinates: 38°46′55″N 76°14′55″W
- Construction started: Circa 1805

Mount Misery is a historic residence near Saint Michaels in rural Talbot County, Maryland, United States. Once owned by early 19th-century farmer and slaveholder Edward Covey, it was where young slave Frederick Douglass was sent to be broken. From 2003 to 2019 the house was owned by Donald Rumsfeld. The name of the property is attributed "to the original owner, said to have been a sad and doleful Englishman. His merrier brother then built a house, and to put him on ... named it Mount Pleasant."

== Background ==
The home was built on land granted by Charles Calvert, 3rd Baron Baltimore in 1667. Originally, the home had four bedrooms and five fireplaces. The home was restored in 1954 and currently the measures 4,052 square feet (376.4 m^{2}). It was expanded by Rumsfeld in 2003. It sits on a cliff overlooking the Broad Creek portion of the Chesapeake Bay.

In 1833, Douglass was rented to Covey so that Covey would break the teenage slave's spirit. Both the plantation, and its owner Covey, are described by Douglass in My Bondage and My Freedom. In his subsequent book The Narrative of the Life of Frederick Douglass, Douglass writes that:

Mr. Covey had acquired a very high reputation for breaking young slaves, and this reputation was of immense value to him. It enabled him to get his farm tilled with much less expense to himself than he could have had it done without such a reputation".

During his servitude at Mount Misery, Douglass and Covey had a physical altercation. Douglass came to see this fight with Covey as life-transforming, and he introduced the story in his autobiography as such: "You have seen how a man was made a slave; you shall see how a slave was made a man."

Douglass' attempted escape from the plantation in 1834 led his owner to send him to Baltimore, where he eventually escaped slavery.

The house has gone through different owners and at one point was a bed and breakfast.

In 2003 the house was purchased by Donald Rumsfeld as a vacation home. At the time his neighbors were Vice President Dick Cheney and political strategist Joe Trippi. Rumsfeld sold the house in 2019.

The plantation is the setting of Andrew Satio's play, Mount Misery: A Comedy of Enhanced Interrogations. The play involves Donald Rumsfeld and Frederick Douglass based on the former's purchase of the plantation where Douglass was sent as a slave.

== See also ==
- Wye House
