= Thomas Denham =

American merchant

Thomas Denham was a Philadelphia merchant who plays an important role in The Autobiography of Benjamin Franklin, as a father figure, friend, and benefactor who helps the young Benjamin Franklin during and after his first trip to England in 1724–1726. Upon their return to the Colonies in 1726, Denham employs Franklin as a clerk and bookkeeper in his newly opened shop (where the two also lived together), which was likely located at the current day address of 39 South Front Street, Philadelphia, Pennsylvania.

== Literary significance ==
Besides Franklin himself, Denham is one of the most principled characters introduced in Franklin's autobiography. As such, Denham plays a part in an emotional loss for Franklin, as well as helping facilitate the moral and psychological growth of the protagonist from youth to young adulthood, seeking virtue and fortune in the world. Many elements of the biography are familiar to the bildungsroman, or coming-of-age story (a genre characterized by a number of formal, topical, and thematic features). In a Bildungsroman, the protagonist overcomes some emotional loss with difficulty, and gradually reaches maturity and respectability as they accept, and are accepted by, society. For example, Denham is esteemed for his loyalty, embodiment of Quaker sensibilities, and financial thrift. He is held in high regard to Franklin as an example of an honorable man that has also overcome "errata" in his past.

Franklin reveals that Denham was at one time a merchant in Bristol, England, but after failing in business there, and falling badly in debt, he migrated to America where he was able to make his fortune. Although his life in America may have meant that he had escaped his creditors, he returns to England and repays his creditors in an unusual manner that impresses Franklin:

There, by a close application to business as a merchant, he [Denham] acquired a plentiful fortune in a few years. Returning to England in the ship with me, he invited his old creditors to an entertainment, at which he thanked them for the easy composition they had favored him with, and, when they expected nothing but the treat, every man at the first remove found under his plate an order on a banker for the full amount of the unpaid remainder with interest.

During their time in England, Denham shows candor by telling Franklin rightly that Governor Keith had betrayed him and thus stranded him in England. Denham's initial kindness to Franklin is further cemented as permanent loyalty after Franklin helps him thwart a plot against one of his friends, Andrew Hamilton, the prominent Philadelphia lawyer. Denham encourages Franklin to find employment and save money so that they may return to America together. Upon returning to Philadelphia, Franklin works and lives with Denham until Denham's death in 1727, when Franklin again takes up his printing trade. Franklin describes the loss of Denham as follows:

Mr. Denham took a store in Water-street, where we opened our goods; I attended the business diligently, studied accounts, and grew, in a little time, expert at selling. We lodged and boarded together; he counseled me as a father, having sincere regard for me. I respected and loved him, and we might have gone on together very happy, but, in the beginning of February, 1726/7, when I had just pass'd my twenty-first year, we both were taken ill. My distemper was a pleurisy, which very nearly carried me off. I suffered a good deal, gave up the point in my own mind, and was rather disappointed when I found myself recovering, regretting, in some degree, that I must now, some time or other, have all that disagreeable work to do over again. I forget what his distemper was; it held him a long time, and at length carried him off. He left me a small legacy in a nuncupative will, as a token of his kindness for me, and he left me once more to the wide world; for the store was taken into the care of his executors, and my employment under him ended.
