= Narrative of the Life of Frederick Douglass =

Autobiography

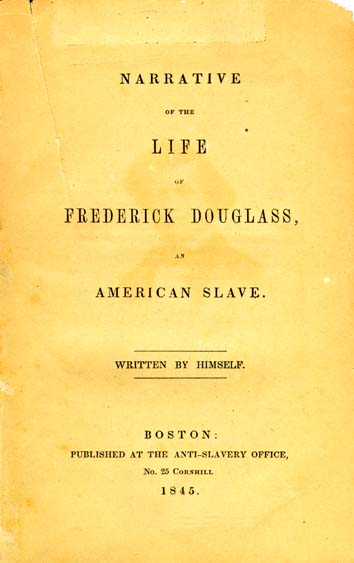
- Author: Frederick Douglass
- Language: English
- Subject: Civil rights
- Genre: Autobiography, slave narrative
- Publisher: Anti-Slavery Office
- Publication date: 1845
- Publication place: United States
- Dewey Decimal: 973.8
- LC Class: E449 .D749
- Followed by: The Heroic Slave
- Text: Narrative of the Life of Frederick Douglass at Wikisource

Narrative of the Life of Frederick Douglass, an American Slave is an 1845 memoir and treatise on abolition written by African-American orator and former slave Frederick Douglass during his time in Lynn, Massachusetts. It is the first of Douglass's three autobiographies, the others being My Bondage and My Freedom (1855) and Life and Times of Frederick Douglass (1881, revised 1892).

Narrative of the Life of Frederick Douglass is generally held to be the most famous of a number of narratives written by former slaves during the same period. In factual detail, the text describes the events of his life and is considered to be one of the most influential pieces of literature to fuel the abolitionist movement of the early 19th century in the United States.

Narrative of the Life of Frederick Douglass comprises eleven chapters that recount Douglass's life as a slave and his ambition to become a free man. It contains two introductions by well-known white abolitionists: a preface by William Lloyd Garrison and a letter by Wendell Phillips, both arguing for the veracity of the account and the literacy of its author.

== Synopsis ==
Douglass begins by explaining that he does not know the date of his birth, and that his mother died when he was 7 years old. He has very few memories of her (children were commonly separated from their mothers), only of the rare nighttime visit. At a very early age, he sees his Aunt Hester being whipped. This exposes Douglass to the true nature of slavery.

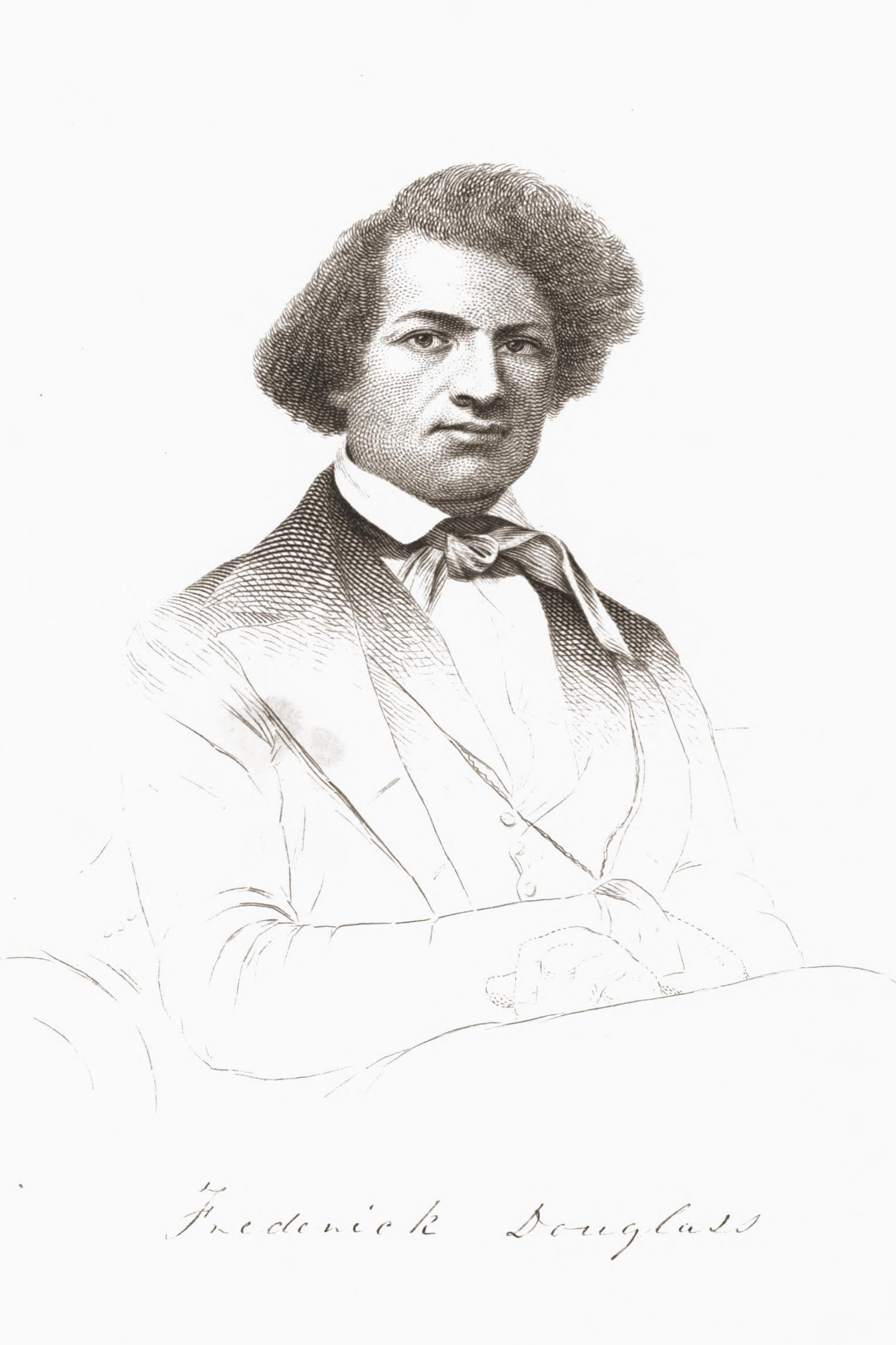
Frontispiece of Douglass from the first edition

Douglass is moved to Baltimore, Maryland. He discusses the wife of his new owner, Sophia Auld. Initially, she teaches Douglass the alphabet and how to spell small words, but her husband, Hugh Auld, disapproves and states that if slaves could read, they would not be fit to be slaves. (Anti-literacy laws also prohibited teaching antebellum slaves to read and write.) Upon hearing this, Douglass realizes the importance of reading and the possibilities that this skill could allow him. He takes it upon himself to learn how to read and does so by playing games with white neighboring children.

When Douglass is ten or eleven, his master dies, and his property, including his slaves, is divided between the master's son and daughter. Douglass sees how slaves are valued along with livestock, deepening his hatred of slavery. He is sent back to Baltimore to live with the Auld family.

He is then moved through a few situations before being sent to St. Michael's. His regret at not having attempted to run away is evident, but on his voyage he makes a mental note that he traveled in a north-easterly direction and considers this information to be of extreme importance. For some time, he lives with Thomas Auld. Douglass is pleased when he eventually is lent to Edward Covey, owner of the Mount Misery plantation, for a year, simply because he would be fed. Covey is known as a "negro-breaker", who breaks the will of slaves.

He is worked and beaten to exhaustion, which finally causes him to collapse one day while working in the fields. Because of this, he is brutally beaten once more by Covey. A few days later, Covey attempts to tie up Douglass, but he fights back. After a two-hour long physical battle, Douglass ultimately conquers Covey. After this fight, he is never beaten again. Douglass is not punished by the law. When his one-year contract ends under Covey, Douglass is sent to live on William Freeland's plantation. On Freeland's plantation, Douglass befriends other slaves and teaches them how to read. Douglass and a small group of slaves plan to escape, but they are caught and Douglass is jailed. Following his release about a week later, he is sent to Baltimore once more. He becomes an apprentice in a shipyard, where he is disliked by several white apprentices due to his slave status and race; at one point he gets into a fight with them and they nearly gouge out his left eye. Woefully beaten, Douglass goes to Hugh Auld, who is kind regarding this situation and refuses to let Douglass return to the shipyard. Hugh Auld tries to find a lawyer but all refuse, saying they can only do something for a white person. Douglass eventually finds his own job and plans the day on which he will escape to the North. He succeeds in reaching New Bedford, but he does not give details in order to protect those who help others flee enslavement. He attends an anti-slavery convention and eventually becomes a well-known orator and abolitionist.

After the main narrative, Douglass's appendix clarifies that he is not against religion as a whole; instead he referred to "the slaveholding religion of this land, and with no possible reference to Christianity proper". He includes a satire of a hymn, titled simply "A Parody". It criticizes religious slave owners, each stanza ending with the phrase "heavenly union", mimicking the original's form.

== Publication history ==
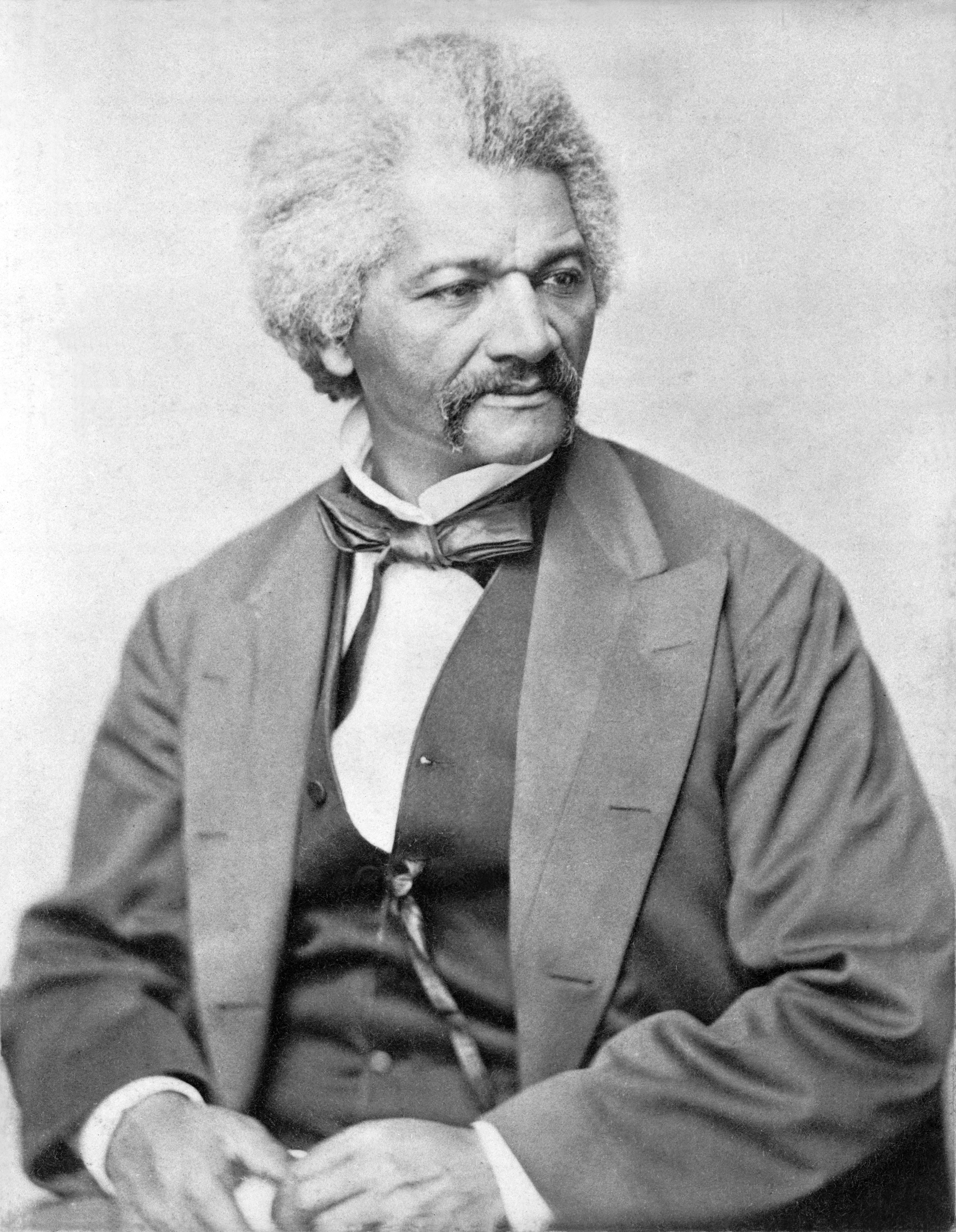
Douglass, photographed between 1850 and 1860

Douglass's Narrative was published on May 1, 1845, and within four months of this publication, five thousand copies were sold. By 1860, almost 30,000 copies were sold. After publication, he left Lynn, Massachusetts and sailed to England and Ireland for two years in fear of being recaptured by his owner in the United States. While there, he gained supporters who paid $710.96 to purchase his emancipation from his legal owner. One of the more significant reasons Douglass published his Narrative was to offset the demeaning manner in which white people viewed him. When he spoke in public, his white abolitionist associates established limits to what he could say on the platform. More specifically, they did not want him to analyze the current slavery issues or to shape the future for black people. However, once Narrative of the Life of Frederick Douglass was published, he was given the liberty to speak more honestly. Because of the work in his Narrative, Douglass gained significant credibility from those who previously did not believe the story of his past. While Douglass was in Ireland, the Dublin edition of the book was published by the abolitionist printer Richard D. Webb to great acclaim and in later editions Douglass wrote extensively in later editions very positively about his experience in Ireland. His newfound liberty on the platform eventually led him to start a Black newspaper, against the advice of his "fellow" abolitionists--the North Star.

== Reactions to the text ==
A letter questioning the veracity of Douglass's account came from A. C. C. Thompson, was a neighbor of Thomas Auld, who was Douglass's master for some time. In Thompson's "Letter from a Slave Holder", he claimed that the slave he knew was "an unlearned, and rather an ordinary negro". Thompson was confident that Douglass "was not capable of writing the Narrative". He also disputed Douglass's description in the Narrative of various cruel white slave holders that he either knew or knew of.

Prior to the publication of the Narrative, the public could not fathom how a formerly enslaved person could appear to be so educated. Upon listening to his oratory, many were skeptical of the stories he told. After publication of the Narrative, however, the public was swayed. Margaret Fuller, a prominent transcendentalist, author, and editor, admired Douglass's book: "we have never read [a narrative] more simple, true, coherent, and warm with genuine feeling". She also suggested that "every one may read his book and see what a mind might have been stifled in bondage, — what a man may be subjected to the insults of spendthrift dandies, or the blows of mercenary brutes, in whom there is no whiteness except of the skin, no humanity in the outward form".... Douglass's Narrative was influential in the anti-slavery movement.

== Influence on contemporary black studies ==
Angela Y. Davis analyzed Douglass's Narrative in two lectures delivered at UCLA in 1969, titled "Recurring Philosophical Themes in Black Literature." Those lectures were subsequently published during Davis's imprisonment in 1970–1971 as the 24-page pamphlet Lectures on Liberation. The lectures, along with a 2009 introduction by Davis, were republished in Davis's 2010 new critical edition of the Narrative.

The first chapter of this text has also been mobilized in several major texts that have become foundational texts in contemporary Black studies: Hortense Spillers in her article "Mama's Baby, Papa's Maybe: An American Grammar Book” (1987); Saidiya Hartman in her book Scenes of Subjection: Terror, Slavery, and Self-Making in Nineteenth-Century America (1997), and Fred Moten in his book In the Break: The Aesthetics of the Black Radical Tradition (2003). Each author uniquely contends with and navigates through Douglass’s writing. Specifically, each author has a divergent approach to revisiting or reproducing narratives of the suffering enslaved body. These divergences on Douglass are further reflected in their differing explorations of the conditions where subject and object positions of the enslaved body are produced and/or troubled. Spillers mobilizes Douglass’s description of his and his siblings’ early separation from their mother and subsequent estrangement from each other to articulate how the syntax of subjectivity, in particular “kinship”, has a historically specific relationship to the objectifying formations of chattel slavery which denied genetic links and familial bonds between the enslaved. This denial was part of the processes that worked to reinforce the enslaved position as property and object. Spillers frames Douglass’s narrative as writing that, although frequently returned to, still has the ability to “astonish” contemporary readers with each return to this scene of enslaved grief and loss (Spillers, “Mama’s Baby”, 76). By tracing the historical conditions of captivity through which slave humanity is defined as “absence from a subject position” narratives like Douglass’s, chronicles of the Middle Passage, and Incidents in the Life of a Slave Girl, are framed as impression points that have not lost their affective potential or become problematically familiar through repetitions or revisions (Spillers, “Mama’s Baby”, 66). Spillers own (re)visitation of Douglass’s narrative suggests that these efforts are a critical component to her assertion that “[i]n order for me to speak a truer word concerning myself, I must strip down through layers of attenuated meanings, made an excess in time, over time, assigned by a particular historical order, and there await whatever marvels of my own inventiveness” (Spillers, "Mama's Baby", 65).

In contrast to Spiller’s articulation that repetition does not rob Douglass’s narrative of its power, Saidiya Hartman explores how an over familiarity with narratives of the suffering enslaved body is problematic. In Hartman's work, repeated “exposure of the violated body” is positioned as a process that can lead to a benumbing “indifference to suffering” (Hartman, Scenes of Objection, 4). This turn away from Douglass’ description of the violence carried out against his Aunt Hester is contextualized by Hartman's critical examination of 19th century abolitionist writings in the Antebellum South. These abolitionist narratives included extreme representations of violence carried out against the enslaved body which were included to establish the slave's humanity and evoke empathy while exposing the terrors of the institution. However, Hartman posits that these abolitionist efforts, which may have intended to convey enslaved subjectivities, actually aligned more closely to replications of objectivity since they “reinforce[d] the ‘thingly’ quality of the captive by reducing the body to evidence” (Hartman, Scenes of Subjection, 19). Instead of concentrating on these narratives that dramatized violence and the suffering black body, Hartman is more focused on revealing the quotidian ways that enslaved personhood and objectivity were selectively constructed or brought into tension in scenes like the coffle, coerced performances of slave leisure on the plantation, and the popular theater of the Antebellum South.

Fred Moten's engagement with Narrative of The Life of Frederick Douglass echoes Spillers assertion that “every writing as a revision makes the ‘discovery’ all over again” (Spillers, 69). In his book chapter “Resistance of the Object: Aunt Hester’s Scream” he speaks to Hartman's move away from Aunt Hester's experience of violence. Moten questions whether Hartman's opposition to reproducing this narrative is not actually a direct move through a relationship between violence and the captive body positioned as object, that she had intended to avoid. Moten suggests that as Hartman outlines the reasons for her opposition, her written reference to the narrative and the violence of its content may indeed be an inevitable reproduction. This is reflected in his question “of whether performance in general is ever outside the economy of reproduction” (Moten, In the Break, 4). A key parameter in Moten's analytical method and the way he engages with Hartman's work is an exploration of blackness as a positional framework through which objectivity and humanity are performed. This suggests that an attempt to move beyond the violence and object position of Aunt Hester would always be first a move through these things. Through this framework of the performativity of blackness Moten's revisitation of Douglass’s narrative explores how the sounds of black performance might trouble conventional understandings of subjectivity and subjective speech.

== See also ==
- My Bondage and My Freedom (1855), Douglass's second autobiography
- Self-Made Men (Frederick Douglass)
- The Heroic Slave, a Heartwarming Narrative of the Adventures of Madison Washington, in Pursuit of Liberty (1852), a fictional narrative by Douglass based on the experiences of Madison Washington.
- Life and Times of Frederick Douglass (1881, 1892), Douglass's third autobiography
- Timeline of Lynn, Massachusetts
