= The Autobiography of Benjamin Franklin =

1791 book by Benjamin Franklin

Autobiography of Benjamin Franklin
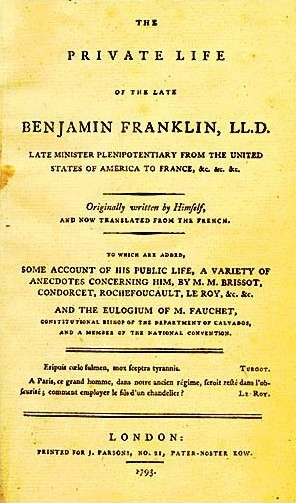
- Cover of the first English edition of 1793.
- Author: Benjamin Franklin
- Original title: Mémoires de la vie privée de Benjamin Franklin
- Language: American English
- Genre: Autobiography
- Publisher: Buisson, Paris (French edition); J. Parson's, London (First English reprint)
- Publication date: 1791
- Publication place: United States
- English publication date: 1793
- Pages: 143

The Autobiography of Benjamin Franklin is the traditional name for the unfinished record of his own life written by Benjamin Franklin from 1771 to 1790; however, Franklin appears to have called the work his Memoirs. Although it had a tortuous publication history after Franklin's death, this work has become one of the most famous and influential examples of an autobiography ever written.

Franklin's account of his life is divided into four parts, reflecting the different periods during which he wrote them. There are actual breaks between the first three parts of the narrative, but Part Three's narrative continues into Part Four without an authorial break. The work ends with events in his life from the year 1758 when he was 52 (Franklin would die in 1790 at age 84).

In the "Introduction" of the 1916 publication of the Autobiography, editor F. W. Pine wrote that Franklin's biography provided the "most remarkable of all the remarkable histories of our self-made men" with Franklin as the greatest exemplar.

== Summary ==
=== Part One ===
Part One of the Autobiography is addressed to Franklin's son William age 41, at that time (1771) Royal Governor of New Jersey. While in England at the estate of the Bishop of St Asaph in Twyford, the 65-year-old Franklin begins by describing his parents and grandparents, recounting his childhood, expressing his fondness for reading, and narrating his apprenticeship to his brother James Franklin, a Boston printer and publisher of the New-England Courant. A fan of the Spectator by Joseph Addison and Sir Richard Steele, Franklin slipped an anonymous paper under the door of his brother's printing house at night. Not knowing its author, James Franklin published it in the Courant, which encouraged Franklin to publish more essays under the pen name Silence Dogood, later collected as the "Silence Dogood" essays. When Franklin finally revealed his authorship, James Franklin was angered, leading to frequent disputes between the two, and causing Franklin to eventually abandon the apprenticeship.

After being jailed by authorities, James Franklin was ordered to cease publication of the Courant, leading him to contrive to have the paper continue under his brother Benjamin's name, but fully under his own control. While signing the discharge of Franklin's apprenticeship, James Franklin attempted to draft new secret indenture papers that would secure Franklin's service for another period of time. But when a fresh disagreement arose between the brothers, Franklin abandoned his brother, correctly judging that he will not produce the secret indenture papers. ("It was not fair in me to take this Advantage", Franklin comments, "and this I therefore reckon one of the first Errata of my life".) James Franklin, however, made it impossible for Franklin to get work anywhere else in Boston. Sneaking onto a ship without his father or brother's knowledge, Franklin headed for New York City, to work with printer William Bradford, but it turned out that Bradford was unable to employ him. However, Franklin was instructed to find Bradford's son Andrew, a Philadelphia printer, who had recently lost an employee.

Arriving in Philadelphia, Franklin finally found work under printer Samuel Keimer. The Governor of Pennsylvania, Sir William Keith, took notice of Franklin and offered to set him up in business for himself. On Keith's recommendation, Franklin traveled to London, but on arrival found that Keith had not written the promised letter of recommendation for him, and that "no one who knew him had the smallest Dependence on him". Franklin found little work there until he returned to Philadelphia as an assistant to Thomas Denham, a Quaker merchant, only to return to Keimer's shop after Denham's unexpected death. After quitting over his wages, Franklin left Keimer to begin a printing partnership with Hugh Meredith, a former co-worker. The shop is subsidized by Meredith's father, though most of the work is done by Franklin as Meredith is not much of worker and is given to drinking.

Their first project was to launch a newspaper, but when Keimer hears of this, he rushes out a paper of his own, the Pennsylvania Gazette, a failure, which Franklin buys from Keimer and makes "extremely profitable". (The Saturday Evening Post traces its lineage to Franklin's Pennsylvania Gazette.) The partners also received an appointment as printers for the Pennsylvania assembly. When financial setbacks led to Meredith's father withdrawing his financial support of the paper, friends loaned Franklin the money he needs to keep it in operation. The partnership amicably dissolved when Meredith relocated to North Carolina, and Franklin continued the business in his own name. In 1730, Franklin married Deborah Read, and after which, with the help of the Junto, he drafted proposals for Library Company of Philadelphia. Part One ends with a memo from Franklin's noting that "The Affairs of the Revolution occasion'd the Interruption".

=== Part Two ===
The second part begins with two letters Franklin received in the early 1780s while in Paris, encouraging him to continue the Autobiography, of which both correspondents have read Part One. (Although Franklin does not say so, there had been a breach with his son William after the writing of Part One, since the father had sided with the Revolutionaries and the son had remained loyal to the British Crown.) At Passy, a suburb of Paris, Franklin begins Part Two in 1784, giving a more detailed account of his public library plan. He then discusses his "bold and arduous Project of arriving at moral Perfection", listing thirteen virtues he wishes to perfect in himself. He creates a book with columns for each day of the week, marking his offenses against each virtue with black spots. Of these virtues, he notices that Order is the hardest for him to keep. He eventually realizes that perfection is not to be attained, but his attempt makes him feel better and happier.

Benjamin Franklin's 13 Virtues

1. Temperance: Eat not to dullness; drink not to elevation.
2. Silence: Speak not but what may benefit others or yourself; avoid trifling conversation.
3. Order: Let all your things have their places; let each part of your business have its time.
4. Resolution: Resolve to perform what you ought; perform without fail what you resolve.
5. Frugality: Make no expense but to do good to others or yourself; i.e., waste nothing.
6. Industry: Lose no time; be always employ'd in something useful; cut off all unnecessary actions.
7. Sincerity: Use no hurtful deceit; think innocently and justly, and, if you speak, speak accordingly.
8. Justice: Wrong none by doing injuries, or omitting the benefits that are your duty.
9. Moderation: Avoid extremes; forbear resenting injuries so much as you think they deserve.
10. Cleanliness: Tolerate no uncleanliness in body, cloaths, or habitation.
11. Tranquillity: Be not disturbed at trifles, or at accidents common or unavoidable.
12. Chastity: Rarely use venery but for health or offspring, never to dullness, weakness, or the injury of your own or another's peace or reputation.
13. Humility: Imitate Jesus and Socrates.

— Autobiography, Section 9

=== Part Three ===
Beginning in August 1788, when Franklin had returned to Philadelphia, the author says he will not be able to utilize his papers as much as he had expected since many were lost in the recent Revolutionary War. He does, however, quote a couple of his writings from the 1730s that survived. One is the "Substance of an intended Creed" consisting of what he then considered to be the "Essentials" of all religions. He had intended this as a basis for a projected sect but, Franklin says, did not pursue the project.

In 1732, Franklin first publishes his Poor Richard's Almanack, which becomes very successful. He also continues his profitable newspaper. In 1734, a preacher named Rev. Samuel Hemphill arrives from County Tyrone Ireland; Franklin supports him and writes pamphlets on his behalf. However, someone finds out that Hemphill has been plagiarizing portions of his sermons from others. However, Franklin rationalizes this by saying he would rather hear good sermons taken from others than poor sermons of the man's composition.

Franklin studies languages, reconciles with his brother James, and loses a four-year-old son to smallpox. Franklin's club, the Junto, grows and breaks up into subordinate clubs. Franklin becomes Clerk of the General Assembly in 1736 thus entering politics for the first time, and the following year becomes Comptroller to the Postmaster General, which makes it easier to get reports and fulfill subscriptions for his newspaper. He proposes improvements to the city's watch and fire prevention regulations.

The famed preacher George Whitefield arrives in 1739, and despite significant differences in their religious beliefs, Franklin assists Whitefield by printing his sermons and journals and lodging him in his house. As Franklin continues to succeed, he provides the capital for several of his workers to start printing houses of their own in other colonies. He makes further proposals for the public good, including some for the defense of Pennsylvania, which cause him to contend with the pacifist position of the Quakers.

In 1740 he invents the Franklin stove, refusing a patent on the device because it was for "the good of the people". He proposes an academy, which opens after money is raised by subscription for it and it expands so much that a new building has to be constructed for it. Franklin obtains other governmental positions (city councilman, alderman, burgess, justice of the peace) and helps negotiate a treaty with the Indians. After helping Thomas Bond establish a hospital, he helps pave the streets of Philadelphia and draws up a proposal for John Fothergill about doing the same in London. In 1753 Franklin becomes Deputy Postmaster General.

The next year, as war with the French is expected, representatives of the several colonies, including Franklin, meet with the Indians to discuss defense; Franklin at this time draws up a proposal for the union of the colonies, but it is not adopted. General Braddock arrives with two regiments, and Franklin helps him secure wagons and horses, but the general refuses to take Ben's warning about danger from hostile Indians during Braddock's planned march to Frontenac (now Kingston, Ontario). When Braddock's troops are subsequently attacked, the general is mortally wounded and his forces abandon their supplies and flee.

A military is formed on the basis of a proposal by Benjamin Franklin, and the governor asks him to take command of the northwestern Frontier. With his son as aide de camp, Franklin heads for Gnadenhut, raising men for the military and building forts. Returning to Philadelphia, he is chosen colonel of the regiment; his officers honor him by personally escorting him out of town. This attention offends the proprietor of the colony (Thomas Penn, son of William Penn) when someone writes an account of it in a letter to him, whereupon the proprietor complains to the government in England about Franklin.

Now the Autobiography discusses "the Rise and Progress of [Franklin's] Philosophical Reputation." He starts experiments with electricity and writes letters about them that are published in England as a book. Franklin's description of his experiments is translated into French, and Abbé Nollet, who is offended because this work calls into question his own theory of electricity, publishes his own book of letters attacking Franklin. Declining to respond on the grounds that anyone could duplicate and thus verify his experiments, Franklin sees another French author refute Nollet, and as Franklin's book is translated into other languages, its views are gradually accepted and Nollet's are discarded. Franklin is also voted an honorary member of the Royal Society.

A new governor arrives, but disputes between the assembly and the governor continue. (Since the colonial governors are bound to fulfill the instructions issued by the colony's proprietor, there is a continuing struggle for power between the legislature and the governor and proprietor.) The assembly is on the verge of sending Franklin to England to petition the King against the governor and proprietor, but meanwhile Lord Loudoun arrives on behalf of the English government to mediate the differences. Franklin nevertheless goes to England accompanied by his son, after stopping at New York and making an unsuccessful attempt to be recompensed by Loudoun for his outlay of funds during his militia service. They arrive in England on July 27, 1757.

=== Part Four ===
Written sometime between November 1789 and Franklin's death on April 17, 1790, this section is very brief. After Franklin and his son arrive in London, the former is counseled by Fothergill on the best way to advocate his cause on behalf of the colonies. Franklin visits Lord Grenville, president of the King's Privy Council, who asserts that the king is the legislator of the colonies. Franklin then meets the proprietaries (the switch to the plural is Franklin's, so apparently others besides Thomas Penn are involved). But the respective sides are far from any kind of agreement. The proprietaries ask Franklin to write a summary of the colonists' complaints; when he does so, their solicitor for reasons of personal enmity delays a response. Over a year later, the proprietaries finally respond to the assembly, regarding the summary to be a "flimsy Justification of their Conduct." During this delay the assembly has prevailed on the governor to pass a taxation act, and Franklin defends the act in English court so that it can receive royal assent. While the assembly thanks Franklin, the proprietaries, enraged at the governor, turn him out and threaten legal action against him; in the last sentence, Franklin tells us the governor "despis'd the Threats, and they were never put in Execution".

== Authorship and publication history ==
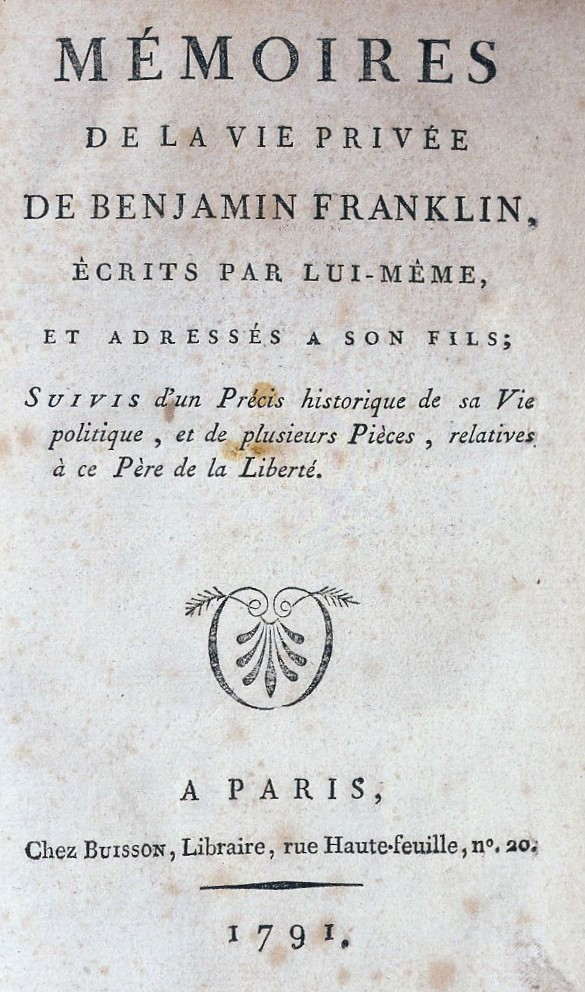
Title page of the original edition of the autobiography in French.

Despite authoring the constituent parts of his autobiography separately and over the course of multiple decades, Franklin intended his composition to stand as a unified piece of work. According to editors J. A. Leo Lemay and P. M. Zall, Franklin began writing part one of the autobiography in July or August 1771, which is also when he most likely authored an outline for the whole work. Over a decade later in 1782, Franklin was prompted by leading Philadelphia merchant Abel James to continue writing the autobiography. In a letter to Franklin that was ultimately included in the autobiography, James wrote of the work:

“If it is not yet continued, I hope thou wilt not delay it, Life is uncertain as the Preacher tells us, and what will the World say if kind, humane and benevolent Ben Franklin should leave his Friends and the World deprived of so pleasing and profitable a Work, a Work which would be useful and entertaining not only to a few, but to millions.”

Franklin subsequently completed Part Two while living in France in 1784. Part Three was authored in 1788–1789 after Franklin returned to the United States, and Part Four was authored by an ailing Franklin in the final stages of his life.

The Autobiography remained unpublished during Franklin's lifetime. In 1791, the first edition appeared, in French rather than English, as Mémoires de la vie privée de Benjamin Franklin, published in Paris. This translation of Part One only was based on a flawed transcript made of Franklin's manuscript before he had revised it. This French translation was then retranslated into English in two London publications of 1793, and one of the London editions served as a basis for a retranslation into French in 1798 in an edition which also included a fragment of Part Two.

The first three parts of the Autobiography were first published together (in English) by Franklin's grandson, William Temple Franklin, in London in 1818, in Volume 1 of Memoirs of the Life and Writings of Benjamin Franklin. W. T. Franklin did not include Part Four because he had previously traded away the original hand-written holograph of the Autobiography for a copy that contained only the first three parts. Furthermore, he felt free to make unauthoritative stylistic revisions to his grandfather's autobiography, and on occasion followed the translated and retranslated versions mentioned above rather than Ben Franklin's original text.

W. T. Franklin's text was the standard version of the Autobiography for half a century, until John Bigelow purchased the original manuscript in France and in 1868 published the most reliable text that had yet appeared, including the first English publication of Part Four. In the 20th century, important editions by Max Ferrand and the staff of the Huntington Library in San Marino, California (Benjamin Franklin's Memoirs: Parallel Text Edition, 1949) and by Leonard W. Labaree (1964, as part of the Yale University Press edition of The Papers of Benjamin Franklin) improved on Bigelow's accuracy. In 1981, J. A. Leo Lemay and P.M. Zall produced The Autobiography of Benjamin Franklin: A Genetic Text, attempting to show all revisions and cancellations in the holograph manuscript. This, the most accurate edition of all so far published, served as a basis for Benjamin Franklin's Autobiography: A Norton Critical Edition and for the text of this autobiography printed in the Library of America's edition of Franklin's Writings.

The Autobiography of Benjamin Franklin also became the first full-length audiobook in history, which was voiced by actor Michael Rye and released in 1969.

In 2005, on the 300th anniversary of Franklin's birthday, writer and economist Mark Skousen published The Compleated Autobiography by Benjamin Franklin. In it, Skousen compiled and edited Franklin's later autobiographical papers to complete the Autobiography, covering from 1757 to the end of Franklin's life.

== Reactions to the work ==
In Frank Woodworth Pine's introduction to the 1916 edition by Henry Holt and Company, Pine wrote that Franklin's Autobiography provided the "most remarkable of all the remarkable histories of our self-made men" with Franklin as the greatest exemplar of the "self-made man".

Franklin is a good type of our American manhood. Although not the wealthiest or the most powerful, he is undoubtedly, in the versatility of his genius and achievements, the greatest of our self-made men. The simple yet graphic story in the Autobiography of his steady rise from humble boyhood in a tallow-chandler shop, by industry, economy, and perseverance in self-improvement, to eminence, is the most remarkable of all the remarkable histories of our self-made men. It is in itself a wonderful illustration of the results possible to be attained in a land of unequaled opportunity by following Franklin's maxims.

Franklin's Autobiography has received widespread praise, both for its historical value as a record of an important early American and for its literary style. It is often considered the first American book to be taken seriously by Europeans as literature. William Dean Howells in 1905 asserted that "Franklin's is one of the greatest autobiographies in literature, and towers over other autobiographies as Franklin towered over other men." By the 1860s, use of the Autobiography and its depiction of Franklin's industry and relentless self-improvement had become widespread as an instructive model for youth. So much so that Mark Twain wrote an essay humorously castigating Franklin for having "brought affliction to millions of boys since, whose fathers had read Franklin's pernicious biography". D. H. Lawrence wrote a notable invective in 1923 against the "middle-sized, sturdy, snuff-coloured Doctor Franklin," finding fault with Franklin's attempt at crafting precepts of virtue and perfecting himself.

Many other readers have found the work's tone conceited, with its frequent references to the universal esteem Franklin claims to enjoy in virtually all times and places throughout his life. Franklin's repeated, highly specific references to his own pursuit of money has put off many readers.

== Literary criticisms ==
- Shurr, William H. (1992). ""Now, Gods, Stand up for Bastards": Reinterpreting Benjamin Franklin's Autobiography". American Literature. 64 (3): 435–451. doi:10.2307/2927746. JSTOR 2927746.
- Baker, Jennifer Jordan (2000). "Benjamin Franklin's "Autobiography" and the Credibility of Personality". Early American Literature. 35 (3): 274–293. doi:10.1353/eal.2000.0001. JSTOR 25057205. S2CID 161751281.
- Beidler, Philip D. (1981). "The "Author" of Franklin's "Autobiography"". Early American Literature. 16 (3): 257–269. JSTOR 25056436.
- Ward, John William (1963). ""Who Was Benjamin Franklin?"". The American Scholar. 32 (4): 541–553. JSTOR 41209128.
- Saunders, Judith P. (2018). “The Autobiography of Benjamin Franklin: The Story of a Successful Social Animal.” American Classics: Evolutionary Perspectives, pp. 1–22. JSTOR.

== Manuscripts and editions to 1900 ==
Manuscripts

- Lost original draft, 1771.
- Copy discovered by Abel James, 1782, given by John Bigelow to the Pierpont Morgan Library, MA 723.
- Le Veillard Copy, returned by Thomas Jefferson in May 1786 and lost, Veillard's translation of this text was acquired in 1908 by the Manuscript Division, Library of Congress.
- William Short Copy, ordered by Thomas Jefferson in 1786, Jefferson Papers, Manuscript Division, Library of Congress.
- William Temple Franklin Copies, purchased by Library of Congress with Henry Stevens papers in 1882, Franklin Papers, Series II, Manuscript Division, Library of Congress.
- Holograph Manuscript purchased from Church by Henry Huntington, Henry Huntington Library, San Marino, California. View annotated text and MS page images at Literature in Context: An Open Anthology of Literature.

Printed editions (1790–1901)

- Stuber, Henry. "History of the Life and Character of Benjamin Franklin." Universal Asylum and Columbian Magazine. 4 (May, June and July 1790), 268–72, 332–39, 4–9.
- Carey, Mathew. "Short sketch of the life of Dr. Franklin." American Museum. 8 (July, November 1790), 12–20, 210–12. Internet Archive
- Franklin, Benjamin. Mémoires de la vie privée de Benjamin Franklin écrits par lui-méme, et adressés a son fils; suivis d'un précis historique de sa vie politique, et de plusieurs pièces, relatives à ce père de la liberté. Translated by Jacques Gibelin. Paris: F. Buisson Libraire, 1791.
- Franklin, Benjamin. Works of the late Doctor Benjamin Franklin: consisting of his life written by himself: together with Essays, humorous, moral & literary, chiefly in the manner of the Spectator: in two volumes. Edited by Benjamin Vaughan and Richard Price. London: Printed for G.G.J. and J. Robinson, 1793.
- Franklin, Benjamin. The private life of the late Benjamin Franklin. London: J. Parsons, 1793.
- Franklin, Benjamin. The life of Dr. Benjamin Franklin. Philadelphia: Benjamin Johnson, 1794.
- Franklin, Benjamin. Benjamin Franklins kleine Schriften: meist in der Manier des Zuschauers: nebst seinem Leben. Weimar: Im Verlage des Industrie-Comptoirs, 1794.
- Franklin, Benjamin. The life of Doctor Benjamin Franklin. Edited by Richard Price. New-London, CN: Charles Holt, 1798.
- Franklin, Benjamin. Vie de Benjamin Franklin écrite par lui-même; suivie de ses œvres morales, politiques et littéraires, dont la plus grande partie n'avoit pas encore été publiée. Edited and translated by J. Castera. Paris: F. Buisson, 1798.
- Franklin, Benjamin. The Works of the late Dr. Benjamin Franklin; consisting of his life written by himself: together with essays humorous, moral, and literary; chiefly in the manner of the Spectator. New York: John Tiebout, 1799.
- Franklin, Benjamin. The Works of the Late Dr. Benjamin Franklin Consisting of His Life, Written by Himself: Together with Essays, Humorous, Moral and Literary, Chiefly in the Manner of the Spectator: to Which Is Added, Not in Any Other Edition, an Examination Before the British House of Lords Respecting the Stamp Act. Philadelphia: Wm. W. Woodward, 1801.
- Franklin, Benjamin. The Complete Works in Philosophy, Politics, and Morals, of the Late Dr. Benjamin Franklin, Now First Collected and Arranged: With Memories of His Early Life. Edited by Marshall. London: J. Johnson, and Longman, Hurst, Rees and Orme, 1806.
- Franklin, Benjamin. Memoirs of the life and writings of Benjamin Franklin. Edited by William Franklin. Philadelphia: T.S. Manning, 1818.
- Franklin, Benjamin. The Life of the Late Dr. Benjamin Franklin. New York. Evert Duyckinck, 1813.
- Franklin, Benjamin. Memoirs of the life and writings of Benjamin Franklin. London: Henry Colburn, 1818.
- Franklin, Benjamin. The works of Dr. Benjamin Franklin. Philadelphia: B.C. Buzby, 1818.
- Franklin, Benjamin. Mémoires sur la vie de Benjamin Franklin écrits par lui-même. Paris: Jules Renouard, 1828.
- Franklin, Benjamin. Memoirs of Benjamin Franklin. Edited by William Temple Franklin, William Duane, George B. Ellis, and Henry Stevens. Philadelphia: M'Carty & Davis, 1831.
- Franklin, Benjamin. The works of Benjamin Franklin. Edited by Jared Sparks. Boston: Hilliard, Gray, and Company, 1836–1840.
- Franklin, Benjamin. The Life of Benjamin Franklin. Edited by Jared Sparks. Boston: Tappan and Dennet, 1844.
- Franklin, Benjamin. Benjamin Franklin: His Autobiography; With a Narrative of His Public Life and Services. Edited by Weld, H. Hastings. New York: Harper and Bros., 1849.
- Franklin, Benjamin. The Autobiography of Benjamin Franklin: published verbatim from the original manuscript, by his grandson, William Temple Franklin. Edited by Jared Sparks. London: Henry G. Bohn, 1850.
- Franklin, Benjamin. Benjamin Franklin's Autobiography. Leipzig: Alphons Dürr, 1858.
- Franklin, Benjamin. Autobiography of Benjamin Franklin edited from his manuscript. Edited by John Bigelow. Philadelphia: J.B. Lippincott & Co., 1868.
- Franklin, Benjamin. The Life of Benjamin Franklin. Edited by John Bigelow. Philadelphia: J.B. Lippincott, 1874.
- Franklin, Benjamin. Franklin's boyhood: from his autobiography. Old South Leaflets, No. 5. Boston: Beacon Press, 1883. Google books
- Franklin, Benjamin. The Autobiography of Benjamin Franklin edited by Henry Morley. Cassell's National Library. London, Paris, New York & Melbourne: Cassell & Company, 1883
- Franklin, Benjamin. The autobiography of Benjamin Franklin, and a sketch of Franklin's life from the point where the autobiography ends, drawn chiefly from his letters. With notes and a chronological historical table. Boston: Houghton, 1886.
- Franklin, Benjamin. The Complete Works of Benjamin Franklin: Including His Private as Well as His Official and Scientific Correspondence, and Numerous Letters and Documents Now for the First Time Printed, With Many Others Not Included in any Former Collection: Also the Unmutilated and Correct Version of his Autobiography. Edited by John Bigelow and Henry Bryan Hall. New York and London: G. P. Putnam's Sons, 1887–1888.
- Franklin, Benjamin. The Autobiography of Benjamin Franklin. New York and London: G. P. Putnam's Sons, 1889.
- Franklin, Benjamin. The autobiography of Benjamin Franklin. Prepared for use in schools. Edited by J. W. Abernethy. English Classic Series. no. 112–113. New York: Charles E. Merrill Co., 1892.
- Franklin, Benjamin. The Autobiography of Benjamin Franklin. Philadelphia: H. Altemus, 1895.
- Franklin, Benjamin. The Autobiography of Benjamin Franklin. New York and Cincinnati: American Book Company, 1896.
- Franklin, Benjamin. The Autobiography of Benjamin Franklin and a Sketch of Franklins Life: From the Point Where the Autobiography Ends. Boston: Houghton, Mifflin, and Co., 1896.
- Franklin, Benjamin. The life of Benjamin Franklin: Franklin's autobiography with the continuation by Jared Sparks. Französische und Englische Schulbibliothek, 52. Edited by Franz Wüllenweber. Leipzig: Renger, 1899.
- Franklin, Benjamin. The Autobiography of Benjamin Franklin: Poor Richard's Almanac and other papers. New York: A. L. Burt Co., 1900.

== Sources ==
- J. A. Leo Lemay & P. M. Zall, eds., Benjamin Franklin's Autobiography: A Norton Critical Edition (NY: Norton, 1986). ISBN 0-393-95294-0. (Used for most information in article, including quotes from Autobiography text, history of publication, and critical opinions).
- Benjamin Franklin: Writings, ed. J. A. Leo Lemay (NY: Library of America, 1987). ISBN 0-940450-29-1. (Notes on p. 1559 are source for dating of Part Four.)
