= Self-made man =

Person responsible for their own success

A self-made man is a person whose success is of their own making.

Benjamin Franklin, one of the Founding Fathers of the United States, has been described as the greatest exemplar of the self-made man. Inspired by Franklin's autobiography, Frederick Douglass developed the concept of the self-made man in a series of lectures that spanned decades starting in 1879.

Originally, the term referred to an individual who arises from a poor or otherwise disadvantaged background to eminence in financial, political or other areas by nurturing qualities, such as perseverance and diligence, as opposed to achieving these goals through inherited fortune, family connections, or other privileges. By the mid-1950s, success in the United States generally implied "business success".

== Origins ==
According to the Oxford English Dictionary, the first documented written usage of "self-made man" was in English physician and philosopher John Bulwer's 1650 poem about body modification, Anthropetamorophosis, or, The Artificial Changeling.

The phrase "self-made man" in its modern sense can be found in both American and British periodicals in the 1820s. General Samuel Blackburn running for office in Virginia in 1824 used it to describe himself. The English writer William Hazlitt described Lord Chatham in The New Monthly Magazine in 1826 as "a self-made man, bred in a camp, not in a court." An 1831 obituarist in The Liberator describing Rev. Thomas Paul wrote, "As a self-made man, (and, in the present age, every colored man, if made at all, must be self-made,) he was indeed a prodigy."

An oft-repeated but no longer credible claim is that the term "self-made man" was "coined" on February 2, 1832, by Henry Clay in the United States Senate. (Historian Irvin G. Wyllie used Clay's Senate speech on that date as his first example of its use in his 1954 book, The Self-Made Man in America: The Myth of Rags to Riches, stating that it "was first applied" on that occasion).

== Self-made man metrics ==
In 2014, Forbes introduced a new metric to the individuals who earned a place on the Forbes 400 wealthiest list. This metric indicates how much a person on the list was responsible for creating his or her wealth. The highest ranking of ten was earned by bootstrappers like Oprah Winfrey and George Soros, who grew up poor and had to "overcome significant obstacles" to earn the status of self-made billionaires. The lowest score of one was assigned to billionaires who had inherited their fortune then did not work to increase it.

== Self-made men ==
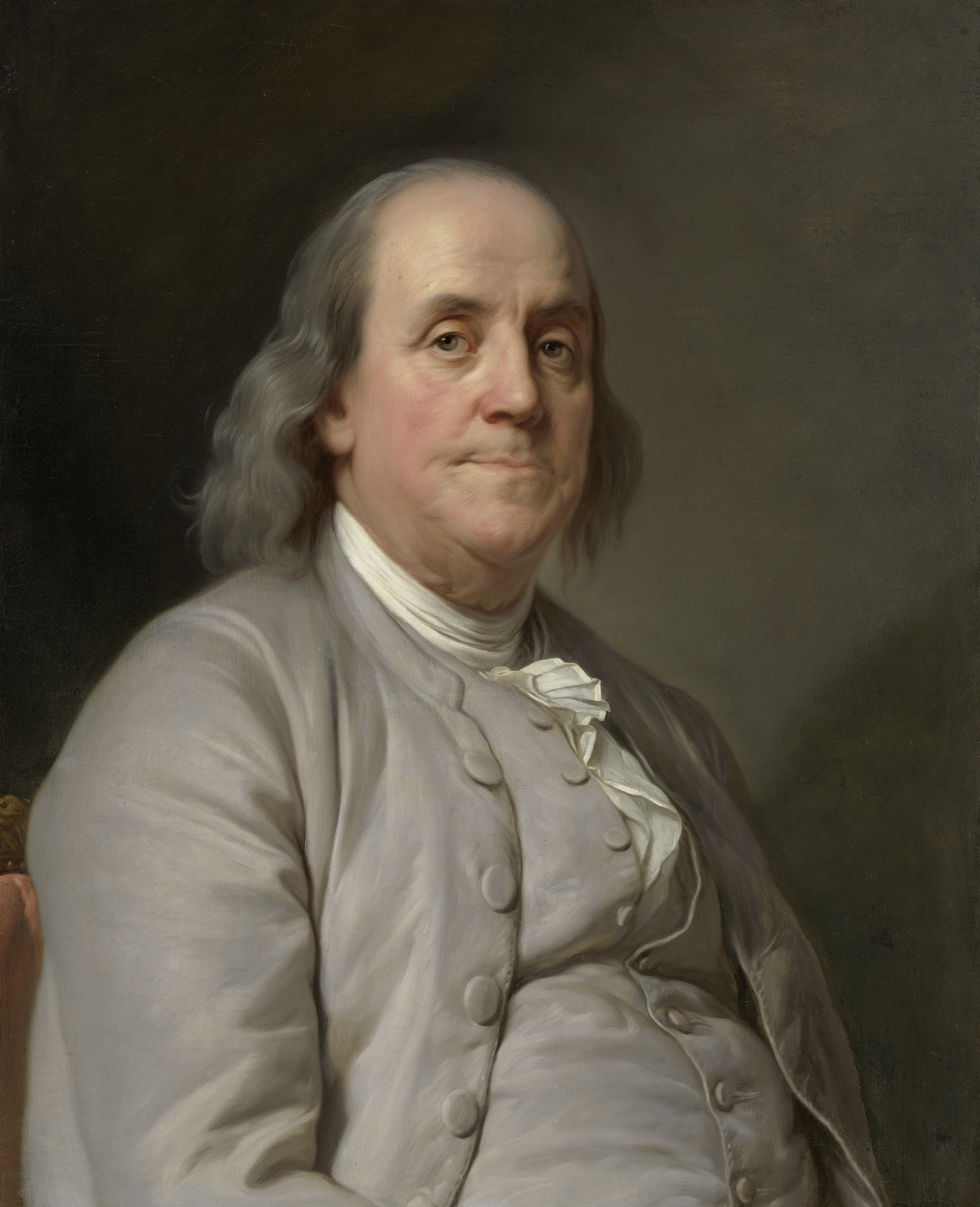
Benjamin Franklin, c. 1785. Oil by Duplessis

Benjamin Franklin, one of the Founding Fathers of the United States, has been described as "undoubtedly the original self-made man." and the greatest exemplar of the "self-made man". Both the American Dream and the self-made man concepts are inextricably linked and are rooted in American history. Franklin's autobiography was described by the editor of the 1916 edition, as the "most remarkable of all the remarkable histories of our self-made men". His autobiography, which was dedicated to his son William Franklin, with the first chapter based on a 1771 letter to William, was used as illustrative of the journey of the self-made man in the eighteenth century in Colonial United States. Franklin introduced the archetypal self-made man through his own life story in which in spite of all odds he overcame his low and humble origins and inherited social position—his father was a candle-maker—to re-invent himself through self-improvement based on a set of strong moral values such as "industry, economy, and perseverance" thereby attaining "eminence" in the classic rags to riches narrative. Franklin's maxims as published in his Autobiography provide others, specifically his own son, with strategies for attaining status in the United States, described as a "land of unequaled opportunity" in the last quarter of the 18th century.

F. W. Pine wrote in his introduction of the 1916 publication of The Autobiography of Benjamin Franklin, that Franklin's biography provided the "most remarkable of all the remarkable histories of our self-made men" with Franklin as the greatest exemplar of the "self-made man".

"Franklin is a good type of our American manhood. Although not the wealthiest or the most powerful, he is undoubtedly, in the versatility of his genius and achievements, the greatest of our self-made men. The simple yet graphic story in the Autobiography of his steady rise from humble boyhood in a tallow-chandler shop, by industry, economy, and perseverance in self-improvement, to eminence, is the most remarkable of all the remarkable histories of our self-made men. It is in itself a wonderful illustration of the results possible to be attained in a land of unequaled opportunity by following Franklin's maxims."

— Frank Woodworth Pine 1916

Franklin and Frederick Douglass, describe the "self-made man in similar language: "Being possessionless and unencumbered by authority is the necessary beginning state for the potential self-made man. One cannot be "made" by the help of a father, teacher, mentor, etc. ..., but must rise by one's own grit, determination, discipline, and opportunism. The irony is that they have made themselves free from bounds and possessions, in a sense impoverished, so that they can then begin to acquire power and wealth on their own. The key is to acquire those possessions and power without help. The goal, then, is not to become famous or wealthy in the literal sense, but to participate in something precise and mythical."

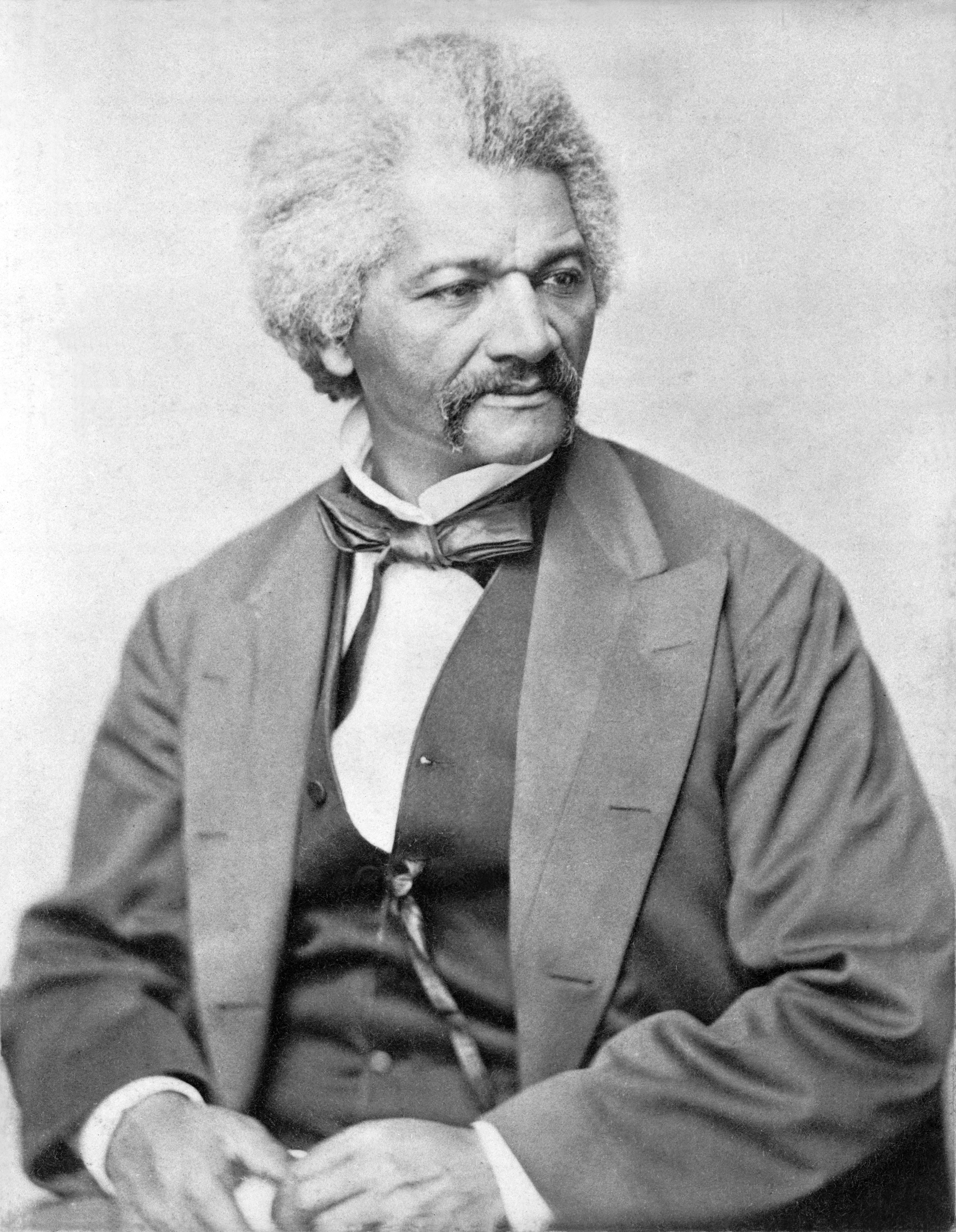
Frederick Douglass, photographed between 1850 and 1860.

Frederick Douglass developed the concepts in a series of lectures "Self-Made Men" from 1859 onward, for example 1895, which were published and archived in "The Frederick Douglass Papers at the Library of Congress". In his 1872 lecture Douglass noted that there were "no such men as self-made men. That term implies an individual independence of the past and present which can never exist ... Our best and most valued acquisitions have been obtained either from our contemporaries or from those who have preceded us in the field of thought and discovery. We have all either begged, borrowed or stolen. We have reaped where others have sown, and that which others have strown, we have gathered." However, he then provided one of his most detailed descriptions of the self-made man,

Self-made men are the men who, under peculiar difficulties and without the ordinary helps of favoring circumstances, have attained knowledge, usefulness, power and position and have learned from themselves the best uses to which life can be put in this world, and in the exercises of these uses to build up worthy character. They are the men who owe little or nothing to birth, relationship, friendly surroundings; to wealth inherited or to early approved means of education; who are what they are, without the aid of any favoring conditions by which other men usually rise in the world and achieve great results. ... They are the men who, in a world of schools, academies, colleges and other institutions of learning, are often compelled by unfriendly circumstances to acquire their education elsewhere and, amidst unfavorable conditions, to hew out for themselves a way to success, and thus to become the architects of their own good fortunes. ... From the depths of poverty such as these have often come. ... From hunger, rags and destitution, they have come ..."

— Frederick Douglass. 1872. "Self-Made Men" (full-text)

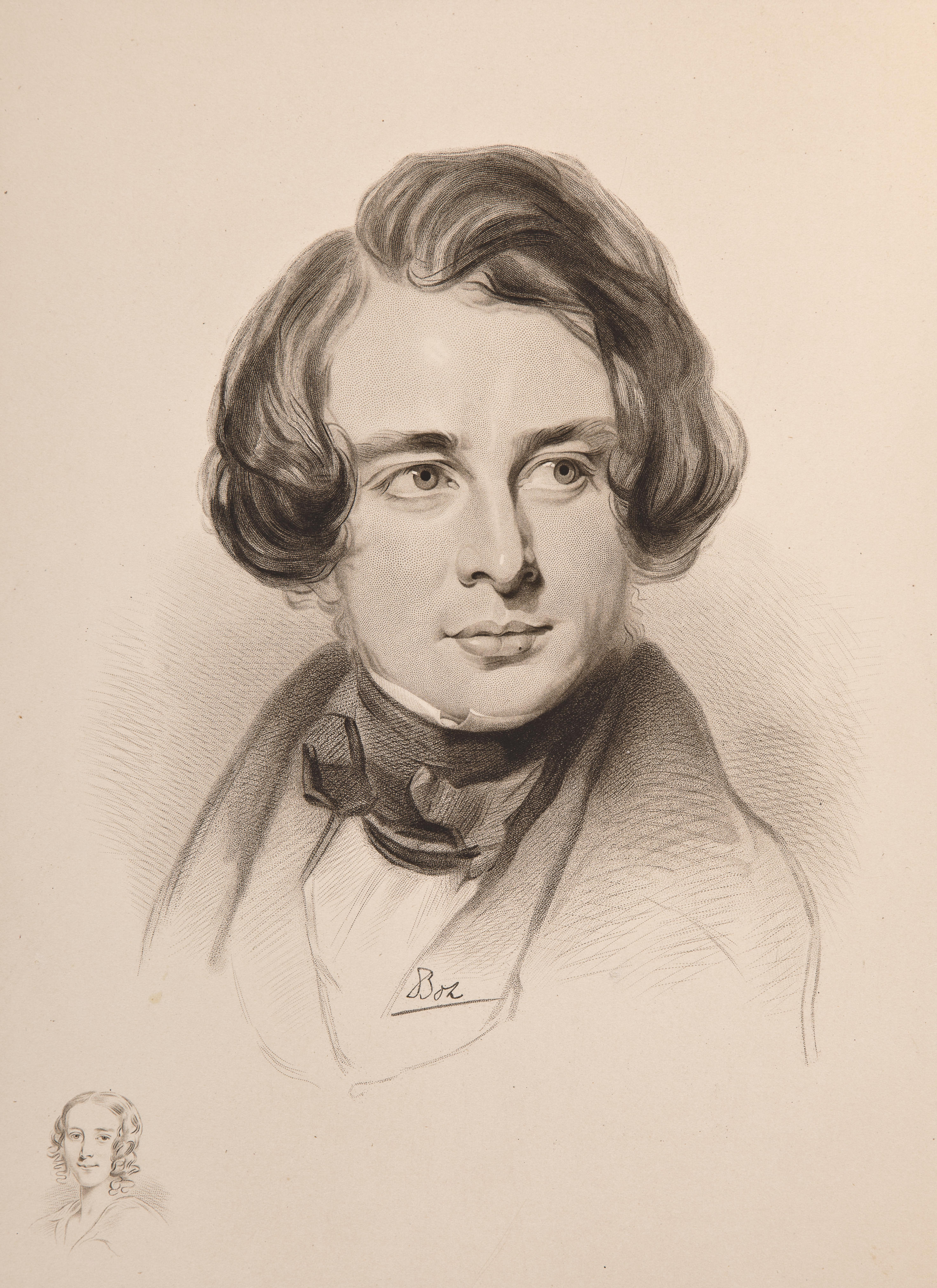
Sketch of English novelist Charles Dickens in 1842. Juliet John backed up the claim for Dickens "to be called the first self-made global media star of the age of mass culture."

Abraham Lincoln, Michael Faraday, George Stephenson, Charles Dickens, Frederick Douglass, P. T. Barnum, Booker T. Washington, Andrew Carnegie, and Henry Ford have also been described as self-made men. Both Carnegie and Lee Iacocca acknowledge that their own autobiographies were influenced by Franklin's. In theirs, both Lincoln and Ronald Reagan described their own origins as somewhat disadvantaged to reflect the narrative of self-made men. Blumenthal began his 2016 biography of Lincoln—A Self-Made Man—with the phrase, "I used to be a slave", referring to Lincoln's claim in 1856 that his "domineering and uneducated father" "exploited" young Lincoln by "renting" him out to "rural neighbors in Indiana." Following his escape from servitude, Lincoln re-invented himself. Lincoln was inspired by Franklin's Autobiography.

The Industrial Revolution spurred the growth of new businesses formed by self-made men in various industries that appeared in towns and cities throughout Britain. According to food historian Polly Russell: "Manufacturers such as Huntley & Palmers in Reading, Carr's of Carlisle and McVitie's in Edinburgh transformed from small family-run businesses into state-of-the-art operations". In addition to goods being sold in the growing number of stores, street sellers were common in an increasingly urbanized country. The soft drinks company, R. White's Lemonade, began in 1845 by selling drinks in London streets in a wheelbarrow. As the spa town of Harrogate, England, grew in size and prosperity in the 19th and early 20th centuries, the self-made men Richard Ellis, George Dawson, and David Simpson, became rich property developers, and draper's apprentice John Turner became even more prosperous as the town's moneylender.

In an 1893 article in a railway magazine, Eugene V. Debs offered Andrew Johnson (1808 – 1875), the 17th President of the United States, Henry Wilson (1812–1875) was the 18th Vice President of the United States (1873–1875), Daniel Webster (1782 – 1852) who served twice as United States Secretary of State, Edward Everett, and Rufus Choate as exemplary nineteenth-century self-made men. Debs contrasted the successful self-made men to those whose "illiteracy, stupidity, lack of ambition, forever keeps them at the bottom ... [who] prefer pool to school, and choose to hammer coal and shovel it into a fire-box rather than employ their leisure in learning what they must know if they expect to rise." He calls on them to "resolve upon a change of habits — renounce follies and vices, obtain elementary books and study."

In John G. Cawelti's 1965 book Apostles of the self-made man, he listed Benjamin Franklin, Thomas Jefferson, Ralph Waldo Emerson, Horatio Alger, and John Dewey as individuals "who either played a major role in shaping the success ideal or were associate with it in the public mind."

In the restaurant business Frank Giuffrida, the owner and manager of the Hilltop Steak House which opened in Saugus 1961 and became the biggest restaurant in the United States by the 1980s, is described as self-made man in the Slate article. Frank Giuffrida's parents were Sicilian immigrants who lived in Lawrence, Massachusetts. He began to work before he completed high school to run the family butcher shop when his father died. He opened the Hilltop Steakhouse after he sold the family store. His innovative strategy was to offer large size portions in a large scale restaurant, making up for the extra cost of generous portions by the economy of scale. According to the New York Times, the "Hilltop exceeded $27 million gross" in 1987.

In the field of modern art, Arshile Gorky has been described as a self-made man who rose from "a dark, rich peasant culture" to prominence among "New York modern artists" through his "self-taught erudition and aggressive principles."

== Self-made women ==
Zhou Qunfei is a Chinese entrepreneur and founder of Lens Technology, a major supplier of touch screens for smartphones and tablets. According to Forbes magazine, as of 2024, she was ranked as the world's ninth richest self-made woman. Based on Forbes metric for ranking billionaires, Zhou Qunfei's score would be ten, as she was born poor and arose to eminence through her own work and initiative.

Kiran Mazumdar-Shaw is a philanthropist and self-made entrepreneur in India's biotechnology industry. She is the founder, executive chairperson, and former managing director of Biocon Limited, a biopharmaceutical company based in Bengaluru.—a company she founded out of her garage in Bengaluru.

== In literature and popular culture ==
=== Ragged Dick (1868) ===
Horatio Alger Jr.'s six-volume Ragged Dick series which began with the first full-length novel, Ragged Dick published in May 1868, a Bildungsroman "whose name became synonymous with the rags-to-riches narrative", where young Dick eventually became the successful and distinguished Richard Hunter.

In 1947, the Alexandria, Virginia-based Horatio Alger Association of Distinguished Americans, which was named after Horatio Alger, to honor the importance of perseverance and hard work. The Association grants scholarships and gives the Horatio Alger Award annually. All scholarships are funded by the generosity of the members of the Horatio Alger Association.

=== The Great Gatsby (1925) ===
In F. Scott Fitzgerald's magnum opus The Great Gatsby, describes the downfall of the "archetypal, if somewhat misguided" "socially ambitious self-made man" Jay Gatsby who rose from "an obscure and impoverished Midwestern childhood to become a wealthy and sought-after center of Long Island society". Gatsby contrasts with Ben Franklin and the characters in Horatio Alger Jr. novels, as successful 'self-made men'. His story serves as a cautionary tale regarding the American Dream where "an unhappy fate is inevitable for the poor and striving individual, and the rich are allowed to continue without penalty their careless treatment of others' lives."

== Ultra high-net-worth individuals ==
According to the 2017 "World Ultra Wealth Report" by research company Wealth-X, "wealth creation" from 1997 through 2017 has been "driven largely by self-made individuals", mainly men. According to the report, ultra high-net-worth individuals (UHNWI), those who have a net worth of at least US$30 million, were "predominantly self-made" having "earned their fortunes". Two-thirds of the UHNWI sourced "their wealth from their own efforts" such as "fruitful business ventures or successful investments." Of the 226,450 UHNWIs, 66% were self-made; of the 7,200 UHNW millennials (born between 1980 and 1995), 66% were self-made; of the 28,985 UHNW women, 45% were self-made; of the 33,290 UHNWI from emerging Asia (excluding Japan, Singapore and Hong Kong), 68% were self-made; and of the 34,961 UHNW Ivy League individuals, 75% were self-made.

== Cultural history ==
In his 2000 book Creating the Modern Man, cultural historian Tom Pendergast traced the way in which the concept of the self-made man was referenced in men's magazines from 1900 through 1950. Pendergast divided masculinity into only two periods: Victorian, which was "based on property-ownership and family", and "post-Victorian", which was "based on a cult of personality, self-improvement, and narcissism". He described the "ideal Victorian man" as a "property owning man of character who believed in honesty, integrity, self-restraint, and duty to God, country, and family". The post-Victorian image of the self-made man was crucial to Pendergast's study. He revealed how through magazines men "were encouraged to form their identities around an ideology of hard work."

== Criticism of concept ==
Mike Myatt in Forbes writes that "behind every success are significant investments and contributions by some if not all the following people: family, friends, associates, protagonists, antagonists, advisors, teachers, authors, mentors, coaches, and the list could go on". Malcolm Gladwell states that "success is a product of culture of background and what your parents and great-grandparents and great great grandparents did for a living".

In September 2011, US Senator Elizabeth Warren challenged the concept of the self-made man in a video that went viral, garnering over one million views on YouTube. Warren stated that "there is nobody in this country who got rich on his own. Nobody".

In his book The Roots of American Individualism, Alex Zakaras describes the notion of a 'self-made man' as one of the three foundational myths of American individualism. He criticizes the concept of 'self-made' in American society as ignoring the role of social structures, privilege, and luck in shaping individual outcomes.

== See also ==
- Autodidacticism
- Bootstrapping
- Cultural icon
- Entrepreneurship
- Epithet
- Parvenu
- Nouveau riche
- Novus homo
- New men
- No man is an island
- Promotion (marketing)
- Rugged individualism
- Social class
- Social mobility
- Survivorship bias
- You didn't build that
