= Edward Covey =

19th-century farmer and American slaveholder in Talbot County, Maryland

- Born: December 2, 1805
- Died: May 2, 1875 (aged 69)
- Occupation: Farmer
- Known for: Maryland slaveholder

Edward Covey (December 2, 1805 – May 2, 1875), was an early 19th-century farmer and slaveholder in Talbot County, Maryland. He owned the plantation known as Mount Misery and was discussed by Frederick Douglass in My Bondage and My Freedom.

== Background ==
Covey is described by Frederick Douglass in My Bondage and My Freedom (published in 1855) as a "first rate hand at breaking young negroes". In The Narrative of the Life of Frederick Douglass, Douglass writes that "Mr. Covey had acquired a very high reputation for breaking young slaves, and this reputation was of immense value to him. It enabled him to get his farm tilled with much less expense to himself than he could have had it done without such a reputation". In 1833, Douglass was rented to Covey for a year so that Covey would break the teenage slave's spirit.

One day, after numerous vicious beatings at Covey's hands, Douglass fought back. He fought off Covey's cousin and his fight with Covey himself, which lasted nearly two hours, ended with Douglass's victory. Douglass later wrote that "It is, perhaps, not altogether creditable to my natural temper, that, after this conflict with Mr. Covey, I did, at times, purposely aim to provoke him to an attack, by refusing to keep with the other hands in the field, but I could never bully him to another battle."

== Legacy ==
Covey's former home, Mount Misery, was recently owned by Donald Rumsfeld. Covey is a character in the opera, Harriet, the Woman Called Moses.

== See also ==
- Wye House
