= My Bondage and My Freedom =

1855 autobiography by Frederick Douglass

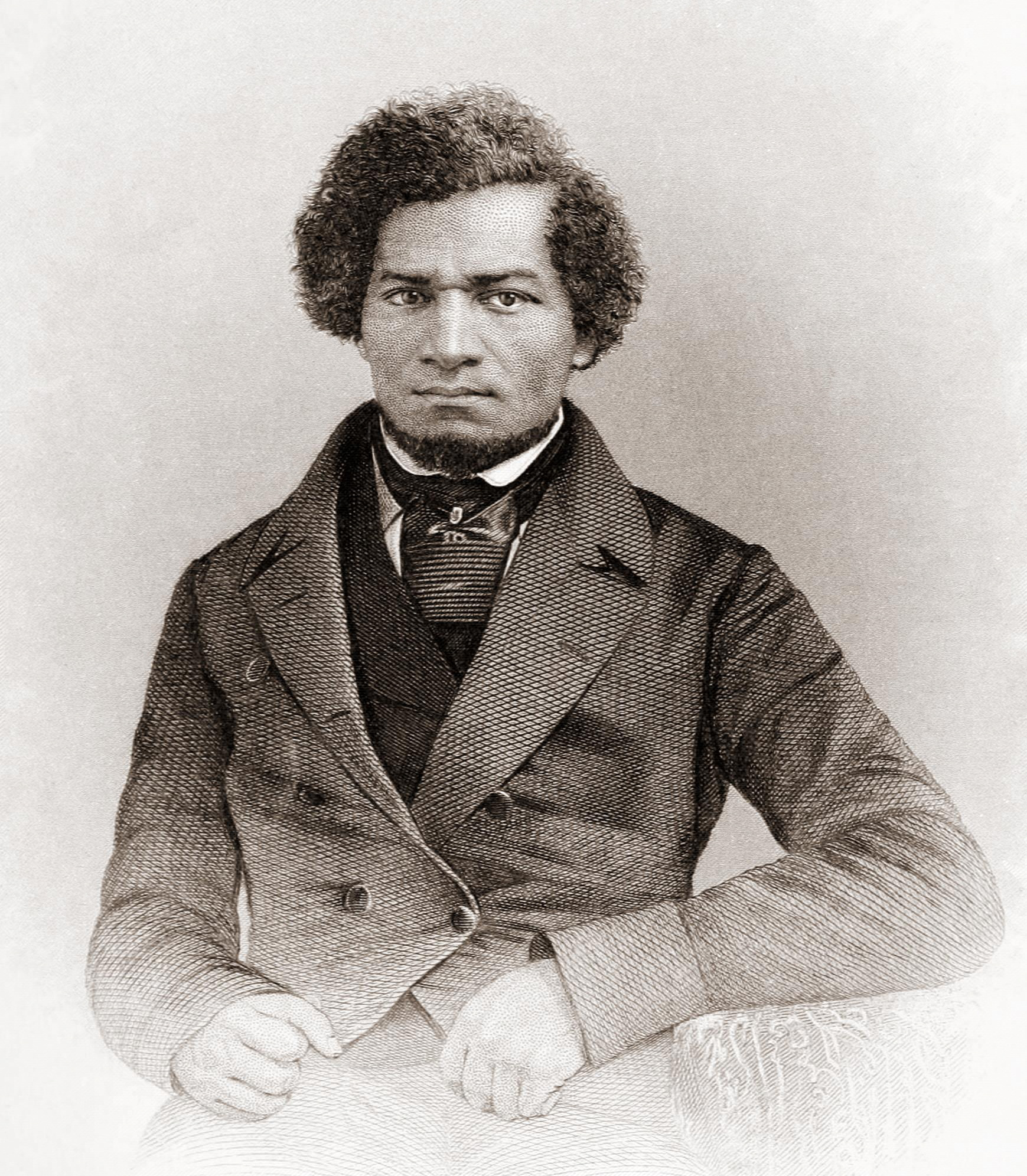
Frederick Douglass, from the 1855 frontispiece

My Bondage and My Freedom is an autobiographical slave narrative written by Frederick Douglass and published in 1855. It is the second of three autobiographies written by Douglass and is mainly an expansion of his first, Narrative of the Life of Frederick Douglass, an American Slave. The book depicts in greater detail his transition from bondage to liberty. Following this liberation, Douglass went on to become a prominent abolitionist, orator, author, newspaper publisher, and advocate for women's rights.

The book included an introduction by James McCune Smith, who Douglass called the "foremost black influence" of his life.

== See also ==
- Edward Covey
