= Earl of March =

Titles in the peerages of Scotland and England

Earl of March is a title that has been created several times, respectively, in the Peerage of Scotland and the Peerage of England. The title derives from the "marches" or borderlands between England and either Wales (Welsh Marches) or Scotland (Scottish Marches), and it was held by several great feudal families which owned lands in those districts. Later, however, the title came to be granted as an honorary dignity, and ceased to carry any associated power in the marches.

The Scottish earldom is extant in its own right, and it is held by James Charteris, 13th Earl of Wemyss and 9th Earl of March.

The English earldom is today the main non-ducal subsidiary title of the Duke of Richmond. The current duke's eldest son, named Charles like his father, enjoys it as a courtesy title.

== Earls of March in the Peerage of Scotland ==
Earldom of March (Peerage of Scotland)
- Arms of the Dunbar Earls of March
- Creation date: 11th century
- Created by: Malcolm III of Scotland
- Peerage: Peerage of Scotland
- First holder: Patrick de Dunbar, 8th Earl of March
- Present holder: James Charteris, 13th Earl of Wemyss and 9th Earl of March
- Remainder to: the 1st Earl's heirs male of the body lawfully begotten.

The Earls of March on the Scottish border were descended from Gospatric, Earl of Northumbria, but being soon afterwards deprived of this position he fled to Scotland, where Máel Coluim III, King of Scotland, welcomed him and granted him Dunbar and the adjoining lands. His successors controlled the Marches, but Earl of March was only assumed as an alternative title to that of Earl of Dunbar by Patrick de Dunbar, 8th Earl of March. The last of his successors was George de Dunbar, 11th Earl of March and Dunbar, whose honours and lands were forfeited to the Crown. He retired to England and died in obscurity.

Following his forfeiture, the next creation of the Earldom of March was for Alexander Stuart, Duke of Albany. At the death of his successor John, the dukedom and earldom became extinct. The next creation was for Robert Stuart, but at his death, the earldom again became extinct.

The most recent Scottish creation of the Earldom of March was in 1697 for Lord William Douglas, second son of the William Douglas, 1st Duke of Queensberry. He was also created Lord Douglas of Neidpath, Lyne and Munard, and Viscount of Peebles, with remainder to heirs male of his body, failing which to his other heirs male and of tailzie. He was succeeded by his son, also William, who married Anne Douglas-Hamilton, 2nd Countess of Ruglen. They were both succeeded by their son, another William, who became 3rd Earl of March and 3rd Earl of Ruglen.

In 1768 the third earl was created Baron Douglas of Amesbury, and in 1778 he succeeded his first cousin twice removed, Charles Douglas, 3rd Duke of Queensberry, as fourth Duke of Queensberry. The duke died childless in 1810, however, and his titles were inherited by several different individuals. The earldom of Ruglen and barony of Douglas of Amesbury became extinct. The dukedom of Queensberry was inherited by his second cousin once removed, Henry Scott, 3rd Duke of Buccleuch (see the Duke of Buccleuch for later history of this title). The marquessate and earldom of Queensberry passed to his kinsman Sir Charles Douglas, 5th Baronet (see the Marquess of Queensberry for later history of these titles). The earldom of March and its two subsidiary titles were inherited by his second cousin once removed Francis Wemyss-Charteris, later the eighth Earl of Wemyss.

=== Scottish Earls of March, first Creation ===
See Earl of Dunbar, for which "Earl of the March" is used as an alternate title

=== Scottish Earls of March, second Creation (1455) ===
- Alexander Stewart, 1st Duke of Albany (c. 1455–1485)
- John Stewart, 2nd Duke of Albany (1481–1536)

=== Scottish Earls of March, third Creation (1581) ===
With subsidiary title Lord (of) Dunbar (1581)

- Robert Stuart, 1st Earl of March (died 1586)

=== Scottish Earls of March, fourth Creation (1697) ===
With subsidiary titles of Lord Douglas of Neidpath, Lyne and Munard, and Viscount of Peebles

- William Douglas, 1st Earl of March (1673–1705), second son of William Douglas, 1st Duke of Queensberry
- William Douglas, 2nd Earl of March (1696–1731)
- William Douglas, 4th Duke of Queensberry and 3rd Earl of March (1724–1810)
- Francis Douglas, 8th Earl of Wemyss and 4th Earl of March (1772–1853)

See Earl of Wemyss and March for later holders of the title.

Marquesses of Queensberry and Dukes of Buccleuch, Dover, Monmouth, and Queensberry

Lord Scott of Buccleuch, 1606
Walter Scott c. 1565–1611; 1st Lord Scott of Buccleuch
Earl of Buccleuch and Lord Scott of Whitchester and Eskdaill, 1619	Viscount Drumlanrig and Lord Douglas of Hawick and Tibbers, 1628; Earl of Queensberry, 1633
Walter Scott c. 1606–1633; 1st Earl of Buccleuch, etc., 2nd Lord Scott of Buccleuch	William Douglas c. 1582 – c. 1639–1640; 1st Earl of Queensberry, etc.
Francis Scott; 1626–1651; 2nd Earl of Buccleuch, etc., 3rd Lord Scott of Buccleuch	King Charles II; 1630–1685	James Douglas d. 1671; 2nd Earl of Queensberry, etc.	William Douglas d. 1673
Duke of Buccleuch (2nd creation), April 1663	Duke of Monmouth, Earl of Doncaster, and Baron Scott of Tynedale, February 1663; Duke of Buccleuch (1st creation), Earl of Dalkeith (1st creation), and Lord Scott of Whitchester and Eskdale, April 1663	Marquess of Queensberry, Earl of Drumlanrig and Sanquhar, Viscount of Nith, Torthorwald and Ross, 1682; Duke of Queensberry, Marquess of Dumfriesshire, 1684	Baronet, of Kelhead, 1668
Mary Scott; 1647–1661; 3rd Countess of Buccleuch, etc., 4th Lady Scott of Buccleuch	Anne Scott; 1651–1732; 1st Duchess of Buccleuch, 4th Countess of Buccleuch, etc., 5th Lady Scott of Buccleuch	James Scott; 1649–1685; Duke of Monmouth, etc., Duke of Buccleuch, etc.	William Douglas; 1637–1695; 1st Duke of Queensberry, etc., 1st Marquess of Queensberry, etc., 3rd Earl of Queensberry, etc.	Catherine Douglas	James Douglas; 1639–1708; 1st Baronet of Kelhead
Dukedoms of Monmouth and Buccleuch and subsidiary titles forfeit, 1685
Duke of Dover, Marquess of Beverley, and Baron Ripon, 1708	Earl of March (Scotland, 4th creation), Viscount of Peebles, and Lord Douglas of Neidpath, Lyne and Munard, 1697
James Scott; 1674–1705 styled Earl of Dalkeith	James Douglas; 1662–1711; 2nd Duke of Queensberry, etc., 1st Duke of Dover, etc., 2nd Marquess of Queensberry, etc.	William Douglas; 1673–1705; 1st Earl of March, etc.	Anne Douglas d. 1700	William Douglas d. 1733; 2nd Baronet of Kelhead
Earl of Doncaster and Baron Scott of Tynedale, restored, 1743	Earl of Solway, Viscount of Tiberris, Lord Douglas of Lockerbie, Dalveen and Thornhill, 1706
Francis Scott; 1695–1751; 2nd Duke of Buccleuch, etc., 5th Earl of Buccleuch, etc., 6th Lord Scott of Buccleuch	Jane Douglas; 1701–1729	James Douglas; 1697–1715; 3rd Marquess of Queensberry, etc.	Charles Douglas; 1698–1778; 3rd Duke of Queensberry, etc., 2nd Duke of Dover, etc., 4th Marquess of Queensberry, etc., Earl of Solway, etc.	William Douglas; 1696–1731; 2nd Earl of March, etc.	James Wemyss; 1699–1756; 5th Earl of Wemyss, etc.	John Douglas c. 1708–1778; 3rd Baronet of Kelhead
Excluded from succession to the dukedoms of Queensberry and Dover (Note: James Douglas, 3rd Marquess of Queensberry was excluded from the line of succession to the Dukedoms of Queensberry and Dover when his father — the 2nd Duke of Queensberry — surrendered all of his titles except the Marquessate and its subsidiary titles back to the Crown and obtained a new grant with the same precedence for the surrendered titles that altered the succession to his second son and then the heirs male and female of the 1st Earl of Queensberry. The succession of the Marquessate continued in remainder to the heirs male of the 1st Earl of Queensberry.)	Dukedom of Dover and its subsidiary titles, and earldom of Solway and its subsidiary titles extinct, 1778
Francis Scott; 1721–1750 styled Earl of Dalkeith	Henry Douglas; 1722–1754 styled Earl of Drumlanrig	Charles Douglas; 1726–1756 styled Earl of Drumlanrig	William Douglas; 1724–1810; 4th Duke of Queensberry, etc., 5th Marquess of Queensberry, etc., 3rd Earl of March, etc., Earl of Ruglen	Francis Wemyss-Charteris; 1723–1808 self-styled 7th Earl of Wemyss, etc.
Henry Scott; 1746–1812; 5th Duke of Queensberry, etc., 3rd Duke of Buccleuch, etc., 7th Lord Scott of Buccleuch	Francis Wemyss Charteris; 1749–1808 styled Lord Elcho	William Douglas c. 1730–1783; 4th Baronet of Kelhead
Baron Wemyss, 1821; Earl of Wemyss attainder reversed, 1826
George Scott; 1768 styled Earl of Dalkeith	Charles William Henry Montagu-Scott; 1772–1819; 6th Duke of Queensberry, etc., 4th Duke of Buccleuch, etc., 8th Lord Scott of Buccleuch	Francis Wemyss Charteris Douglas; 1772–1853; 8th Earl of Wemyss, etc., 4th Earl of March, 1st Baron Wemyss	Charles Douglas; 1777–1837; 6th Marquess of Queensberry, etc., 5th Baronet of Kelhead	John Douglas; 1779–1856; 7th Marquess of Queensberry, etc., 6th Baronet of Kelhead
George Henry Scott; 1798–1808; Lord Scott of Whitchester	Walter Francis Montagu Douglas Scott; 1806–1884; 7th Duke of Queensberry, etc., 5th Duke of Buccleuch, etc., 8th Earl of Buccleuch, etc., 9th Lord Scott of Buccleuch	Francis Wemyss-Charteris; 1795–1883; 9th Earl of Wemyss, 5th Earl of March, 2nd Baron Wemyss	Archibald William Douglas; 1818–1858; 8th Marquess of Queensberry, etc., 7th Baronet of Kelhead
Baron Montagu of Beaulieu (UK), 1885
William Henry Walter Montagu Douglas Scott; 1831–1914; 8th Duke of Queensberry, etc., 6th Duke of Buccleuch, etc., 10th Lord Scott of Buccleuch	Henry John Montagu-Scott; 1832–1905; 1st Baron Montagu of Beaulieu	Francis Wemyss-Charteris; 1818–1914; 10th Earl of Wemyss, 6th Earl of March, 3rd Baron Wemyss	John Sholto Douglas; 1844–1900; 9th Marquess of Queensberry, etc., 8th Baronet of Kelhead
Baron Kelhead (UK), 1893
Walter Henry Montagu Douglas Scott; 1861–1886 styled Earl of Dalkeith	John Charles Montagu Douglas Scott; 1864–1935; 9th Duke of Queensberry, etc., 7th Duke of Buccleuch, etc., 11th Lord Scott of Buccleuch	John Walter Edward Douglas-Scott-Montagu; 1866–1929; 3rd Baron Montagu of Beaulieu	Hugo Richard Charteris; 1857–1937; 11th Earl of Wemyss, 7th Earl of March, 4th Baron Wemyss	Francis Archibald Douglas; 1867–1894 styled Viscount Drumlanrig, Baron Kelhead	Percy Sholto Douglas; 1868–1920; 10th Marquess of Queensberry, etc., 9th Baronet of Kelhead
Barony Kelhead extinct, 1894
Walter John Montagu-Douglas-Scott; 1894–1973; 10th Duke of Queensberry, etc., 8th Duke of Buccleuch, etc., 12th Lord Scott of Buccleuch	Hugo Charteris; 1884–1916	Francis Archibald Kelhead Douglas; 1898–1954; 11th Marquess of Queensberry, etc., 10th Baronet of Kelhead
Baron Charteris of Amisfield, 1978
Walter Francis John Montagu Douglas Scott; 1923–2007; 11th Duke of Queensberry, etc., 9th Duke of Buccleuch, etc., 13th Lord Scott of Buccleuch	Edward John Barrington Douglas-Scott-Montagu; 1926–2015; 3rd Baron Montagu of Beaulieu	Francis David Charteris; 1912–2008; 12th Earl of Wemyss, 8th Earl of March, 5th Baron Wemyss	Martin Michael Charles Charteris; 1913–1999; Baron Charteris of Amisfield	David Harrington Angus Douglas; 1929–2026; 12th Marquess of Queensberry, etc., 11th Baronet of Kelhead
Baron Charteris of Amisfield extinct, 1999
Richard Walter John Montagu Douglas Scott b. 1954; 12th Duke of Queensberry, etc., 10th Duke of Buccleuch, etc., 14th Lord Scott of Buccleuch	Ralph Douglas-Scott-Montagu b. 1961; 4th Baron Montagu of Beaulieu	Jonathan Deane Montagu-Scott b. 11 October 1975	James Charteris b. 1948; 13th Earl of Wemyss, 9th Earl of March, 6th Baron Wemyss	Sholto Francis Guy Douglas b. 1967; 13th Marquess of Queensberry, etc., 12th Baronet of Kelhead	Lord Torquil Oberon Tobias Douglas b. 1978
Heir presumptive to the Barony Montagu of Beaulieu	Heir presumptive to the Marquessate of Queensberry
Walter John Francis Montagu Douglas Scott b. 1984 styled Earl of Dalkeith	Francis Richard (Dick) Charteris b. 1984 style Lord Elcho
Heir presumptive to the Dukedom of Queensbury, etc. and the Dukedom of Buccleuch, etc.	Heir apparent to the earldoms of Wemyss and March
Willoughby Ralph Montagu Douglas Scott b. 2016 styled Lord Eskdaill

== Earls of March in the Peerage of England ==
The Earls of March on the Welsh Marches were descended from Roger Mortimer, as there had been no single office in this region since the Earl of Mercia. He forfeited his title, which was in the Peerage of England, for treason in 1330, but his grandson Roger managed to have it restored eighteen years later. With the death of the fifth Earl, however, there remained no more Mortimers who were heirs to the first Earl, and the title passed to the fifth earl's nephew, Richard Plantagenet, Duke of York. Duke Richard passed the title on to his son Edward, who would later become King Edward IV, causing the earldom of March to merge into the Crown.

In the Peerage of England, the next creation of the earldom came when Edward Plantagenet, Duke of Cornwall was made Earl of March in 1479. In 1483, he succeeded as King Edward V, and the earldom merged in the crown. Later that year, however, his uncle Richard of Gloucester usurped the throne as Richard III.

The next English creation was in favour of Esme Stewart, the third Duke of Lennox. His successors bore the earldom, until the death of the sixth Duke, when both the earldom and the dukedom became extinct. The last English creation was in favour of Charles Lennox, 1st Duke of Richmond and Lennox. His successors have borne the English earldom of March since then.

=== English Earls of March, first Creation (1328) ===
- Roger Mortimer, 1st Earl of March (1287–1330) (forfeit 1330)
- Roger Mortimer, 2nd Earl of March (1328–1360) (restored 1348 (barony), 1354 (earldom))
- Edmund Mortimer, 3rd Earl of March (1352–1381)
- Roger Mortimer, 4th Earl of March (1374–1398)
- Edmund Mortimer, 5th Earl of March (1391–1425)
- Richard Plantagenet, 3rd Duke of York, 6th Earl of March (1411–1460)
- Edward Plantagenet, 4th Duke of York, 7th Earl of March (1442–1483) (became King in 1461)

=== English Earls of March, second Creation (1479) ===
- Edward, Duke of Cornwall (1470–1483?) (proclaimed King in 1483)

=== English Earls of March, third Creation (1619) ===
- Esmé Stewart, 3rd Duke of Lennox (1579–1624)
- James Stewart, 1st Duke of Richmond (1612–1655)
- Esmé Stewart, 2nd Duke of Richmond (1649–1660)
- Charles Stewart, 3rd Duke of Richmond (1639–1672)

=== English Earls of March, fourth Creation (1675) ===
- The title is now held by the Duke of Richmond, and is used as a courtesy title by his heir apparent, currently Charles Henry Gordon-Lennox (born 1994), Earl of March and Kinrara.

== See also ==
- Marcher Lords – English title for the Welsh Marches
- List of Marcher lordships
