= Douglas baronets of Kelhead (1668) =

Escutcheon of the Douglas baronets of Kelhead

The Douglas baronetcy of Kelhead, parish of Cummertrees, Dumfriesshire, was created on 26 February 1668 in the Baronetage of Nova Scotia for James Douglas, son of Sir William Douglas of Kelhead, governor of Carlisle Castle in 1647.

== Douglas baronets, of Kelhead (1668) ==
- Sir James Douglas, 1st Baronet (19 February 1639 – c. 1707)
- Sir William Douglas, 2nd Baronet of Kelhead, (c. 1675 – 10 October 1733). He was the son of the 1st Baronet and Catherine Douglas, a sister of the 3rd Earl of Queensbury (later the Duke of Queensbury). Sir William was married to Helen Erskine, a daughter of Colonel John Erskine, Deputy Governor of Stirling Castle. They had nine children, of whom their eldest son succeeded to the title upon his father's death.
- Sir John Douglas, 3rd Baronet (c 1708 – 13 November 1778) MP for Dumfries-shire 1741–1747
- Sir William Douglas, 4th Baronet (c.1731 – 16 May 1783), MP for Dumfries 1768–1780
- Sir Charles Douglas, 5th Baronet. He subsequently succeeded to the Marquessate of Queensberry in 1810; with which title the baronetcy remains merged.

== Notes ==
Marquesses of Queensberry and Dukes of Buccleuch, Dover, Monmouth, and Queensberry

Lord Scott of Buccleuch, 1606
Walter Scott c. 1565–1611; 1st Lord Scott of Buccleuch
Earl of Buccleuch and Lord Scott of Whitchester and Eskdaill, 1619 | Viscount Drumlanrig and Lord Douglas of Hawick and Tibbers, 1628; Earl of Queensberry, 1633
Walter Scott c. 1606–1633; 1st Earl of Buccleuch | William Douglas (c. 1582 – c. 1639–1640); 1st Earl of Queensberry
King Charles II; 1630–1685 | Francis Scott; 1626–1651; 2nd Earl of Buccleuch | James Douglas d. 1671; 2nd Earl of Queensberry | William Douglas d. 1673
Duke of Monmouth and Earl of Doncaster, Duke of Buccleuch (1st creation) and Earl of Dalkeith, 1663 | Duke of Buccleuch (2nd creation), 1663 | Marquess of Queensberry and Earl of Drumlanrig and Sanquhar, 1682; Marquess of Dumfriesshire, 1683; Duke of Queensberry, 1684 | Baronet Douglas of Kelhead, 1668
James Scott; 1649–1685; Duke of Monmouth and Earl of Doncaster, Duke of Buccleuch and Earl of Dalkeith | Anne Scott; 1651–1732; 1st Duchess of Buccleuch, 4th Countess of Buccleuch | Mary Scott; 1647–1661; 3rd Countess of Buccleuch | William Douglas; 1637–1695; 1st Duke of Queensberry, Marquess of Queensberry, Marquess of Dumfriesshire, and Earl of Drumlanrig and Sanquhar, 3rd Earl of Queensberry | Lady Catherine Douglas | James Douglas; 1639–1708; 1st Baronet of Kelhead
Dukedoms of Monmouth and Buccleuch (1st creation) and earldoms of Buccleuch and Doncaster forfeit, 1663
Duke of Dover and Marquess of Beverley, 1708 | Earl of March, 1697
James Scott; 1674–1705 styled Earl of Dalkeith | James Douglas; 1662–1711; 2nd Duke of Queensberry, 1st Duke of Dover and Marquess of Beverley, 2nd Marquess of Queensberry, Marquess of Dumfriesshire, and Earl of Drumlanrig and Sanquhar | William Douglas d. 1705; Earl of March | William Douglas d. 1733; 2nd Baronet of Kelhead
Earl of Doncaster restored, 1743 | Earl of Solway, 1706
Francis Scott; 1695–1751; 2nd Duke of Buccleuch and Earl of Dalkeith, 2nd Earl of Doncaster | Jane Douglas; 1701–1729 | James Douglas; 1697–1715; 3rd Marquess of Queensberry, Marquess of Dumfriesshire, and Earl of Drumlanrig and Sanquhar | Charles Douglas; 1698–1778; 3rd Duke of Queensberry, 2nd Duke of Dover and Marquess of Beverley, 4th Marquess of Queensberry, Marquess of Dumfriesshire, and Earl of Drumlanrig and Sanquhar, Earl of Solway | William Douglas; 1696–1731; Earl of March | John Douglas c. 1708–1778; 3rd Baronet of Kelhead
Excluded from succession to the dukedoms of Queensberry and Dover (Note: James Douglas, 3rd Marquess of Queensberry, a homicidal maniac, was excluded from the line of succession to the Dukedoms of Queensberry and Dover when his father — the 2nd Duke of Queensberry — surrendered all of his titles except the Marquessate and its subsidiary titles back to the Crown and obtained a new grant with the same precedence for the surrendered titles that altered the succession to his second son and then the heirs male and female of the 1st Earl of Queensberry. The succession of the Marquessate continued in remainder to the heirs male of the 1st Earl of Queensberry.) | Dukedom of Dover and Marquessate of Beverley, and earldom of Solway extinct, 1778
Francis Scott; 1721–1750 styled Earl of Dalkeith | Henry Douglas; 1722–1754 styled Earl of Drumlanrig | Charles Douglas; 1726–1756 styled Earl of Drumlanrig | William Douglas; 1724–1810; 4th Duke of Queensberry, 5th Marquess of Queensberry, Marquess of Dumfriesshire, and Earl of Drumlanrig and Sanquhar, Earl of March
Henry Scott; 1746–1812; 3rd Duke of Buccleuch and Earl of Dalkeith, 5th Duke of Queensberry | William Douglas c. 1730–1783; 4th Baronet of Kelhead
George Scott; 1768 styled Earl of Dalkeith | Charles William Henry Montagu-Scott; 1772–1819; 4th Duke of Buccleuch and Earl of Dalkeith, 6th Duke of Queensberry | Charles Douglas; 1777–1837; 6th Marquess of Queensberry, Marquess of Dumfriesshire, and Earl of Drumlanrig and Sanquhar | John Douglas; 1779–1856; 7th Marquess of Queensberry, Marquess of Dumfriesshire, and Earl of Drumlanrig and Sanquhar
George Henry Scott; 1798–1808; Lord Scott of Whitchester | Walter Francis Montagu Douglas Scott; 1806–1884; 5th Duke of Buccleuch and Earl of Dalkeith, 7th Duke of Queensberry | Archibald William Douglas; 1818–1858; 8th Marquess of Queensberry, Marquess of Dumfriesshire, and Earl of Drumlanrig and Sanquhar
William Henry Walter Montagu Douglas Scott; 1831–1914; 6th Duke of Buccleuch and Earl of Dalkeith, 8th Duke of Queensberry | Henry John Montagu-Scott; 1832–1905; Baron Montagu of Beaulieu | John Sholto Douglas; 1844–1900; 9th Marquess of Queensberry, Marquess of Dumfriesshire, and Earl of Drumlanrig and Sanquhar
Walter Henry Montagu Douglas Scott; 1861–1886 styled Earl of Dalkeith | John Charles Montagu Douglas Scott; 1864–1935; 7th Duke of Buccleuch and Earl of Dalkeith, 9th Duke of Queensberry | Francis Archibald Douglas; 1867–1894 styled Viscount Drumlanrig, Baron Kelhead | Percy Sholto Douglas; 1868–1920; 10th Marquess of Queensberry, Marquess of Dumfriesshire, and Earl of Drumlanrig and Sanquhar
Walter John Montagu Douglas Scott; 1894–1973; 8th Duke of Buccleuch and Earl of Dalkeith, 10th Duke of Queensberry | Francis Archibald Kelhead Douglas; 1898–1954; 11th Marquess of Queensberry, Marquess of Dumfriesshire, and Earl of Drumlanrig and Sanquhar
Walter Francis John Montagu Douglas Scott; 1923–2007; 9th Duke of Buccleuch and Earl of Dalkeith, 11th Duke of Queensberry | David Harrington Angus Douglas b. 1929; 12th Marquess of Queensberry, Marquess of Dumfriesshire, and Earl of Drumlanrig and Sanquhar
Richard Walter John Montagu Douglas Scott b. 1954; 10th Duke of Buccleuch and Earl of Dalkeith, 12th Duke of Queensberry | Sholto Francis Guy Douglas b. 1967 styled Viscount Drumlanrig | Lord Torquil Oberon Tobias Douglas b. 1978
Walter John Francis Montagu Douglas Scott b. 1984 styled Earl of Dalkeith
Willoughby Ralph Montagu Douglas Scott b. 2016; Lord Eskdaill
