= Duke of Buccleuch =

Scottish title of nobility

Dukedom of Buccleuch held with Dukedom of Queensberry
- Creation date: 1663
- Created by: Charles II
- Peerage: Peerage of Scotland
- First holder: James Scott
- Present holder: Richard Scott, 10th Duke
- Heir apparent: Walter Scott, Earl of Dalkeith
- Remainder to: the 1st Duke's heirs male of the body lawfully begotten
- Subsidiary titles: Marquess of Dumfriesshire; Earl of Buccleuch; Earl of Dalkeith; Earl of Doncaster; Earl of Drumlanrig and Sanquhar; Viscount of Nith, Tortholwald and Ross; Baron Scott of Tindale; Lord Scott of Buccleuch; Lord Scott of Whitchester and Eskdaill; Lord Douglas of Kilmount, Middlebie and Dornock
- Seats: Bowhill House; Drumlanrig Castle; Boughton House; Eildon Hall; Dalkeith Palace*
- Former seats: Montagu House; Beaulieu Palace House
- Motto: Amo ("I love")
- *Dalkeith Palace remains in the ownership of the Dukes, but is not presently inhabited by them or their family.

Duke of Buccleuch (/bəˈkluː/ bə-KLOO), formerly also spelt Duke of Buccleugh, is a title in the Peerage of Scotland created twice on 20 April 1663, first for James Scott, Duke of Monmouth, and second suo jure for his wife Anne Scott, 4th Countess of Buccleuch. Monmouth, the eldest illegitimate son of King Charles II, was attainted after rebelling against his uncle King James II and VII, but his wife's title was unaffected and passed on to their descendants, who have successively borne the surnames Scott, Montagu-Scott, Montagu Douglas Scott and Scott again. In 1810, the 3rd Duke of Buccleuch inherited the Dukedom of Queensberry, also in the Peerage of Scotland, thus separating that title from the Marquessate of Queensberry.

== History ==
The substantial origin of the ducal house of the Scotts of Buccleuch dates back to the large grants of lands in Scotland to Sir Walter Scott of Kirkurd and Buccleuch, a border chief, by King James II, in consequence of the fall of the 8th Earl of Douglas (1452), but the family traced their descent back to a Sir Richard le Scott (1240–1285). Sir Walter Scott of Branxholme and Buccleuch (died 1552) distinguished himself at the Battle of Pinkie Cleugh (1547). His great-grandson Sir Walter was created Lord Scott of Buccleuch in 1606.

The novelist Sir Walter Scott, Bart., was directly descended of the Lords of Buccleuch. His family history, fancifully interpreted, is the main subject of much of The Lay of the Last Minstrel.

William Montagu Douglas Scott, Earl of Dalkeith, who became the 7th Duke of Buccleuch was elected President of St. Andrew's Ambulance Association in 1908. The Presidency of the Association (now St Andrew's First Aid) has been held by the Buccleuch family from that date.

Sarah Ferguson, former wife of Andrew Mountbatten-Windsor, is a great-great-granddaughter of the 6th Duke of Buccleuch.

The 7th Duke of Buccleuch had a daughter, Alice, who married Prince Henry, Duke of Gloucester (third son of King George V and uncle of Queen Elizabeth II) in 1935, becoming a member of the British royal family. Prince Richard, Duke of Gloucester and Prince William of Gloucester are grandsons of the 7th Duke of Buccleuch.

Most of the Dukes of Buccleuch (the 3rd, 4th, 5th, 6th, 7th) are buried in the Buccleuch Memorial Chapel in St. Mary's Episcopal Church, Dalkeith, Midlothian. The 2nd Duke (died 1751) is buried in Eton College Chapel. The most recent Dukes (the 8th and 9th) are buried among the ruins of Melrose Abbey in Melrose.

Dukes of Buccleuch are invariably granted the honour of Knight of the Order of the Thistle.

=== Subsidiary titles ===
Other titles in the Peerages of the British Isles held by the Duke of Buccleuch include: Earl of Buccleuch (1619), Earl of Dalkeith (1663) and Lord Scott of Whitchester and Eskdaill (1619) (all in the Peerage of Scotland). The Duke also holds the two subsidiary titles of the attainted Dukedom of Monmouth, namely Earl of Doncaster (1663) and Baron Scott of Tindale (1663) (both in the Peerage of England), and several subsidiary titles associated with the Dukedom of Queensberry, namely Marquess of Dumfriesshire (1683), Earl of Drumlanrig and Sanquhar (1682), Viscount of Nith, Tortholwald and Ross (1682) and Lord Douglas of Kilmount, Middlebie and Dornock (1682) (all in the Peerage of Scotland). The Earldom of Doncaster and Barony of Scott of Tindale had been forfeit at the time of the first Duke's attainder, but the titles were restored to the 2nd Duke of Buccleuch in 1742. Until 1835, the Dukes also held lands in the West Riding of Yorkshire and the ancient title of Lord of Bowland. The Duke of Buccleuch is the hereditary chief of Clan Scott. The holder is one of only five people in the UK to hold multiple different dukedoms, the others being Cornwall/Rothesay/Cambridge (all currently held by the Prince of Wales), Hamilton/Brandon, Argyll (Scotland/UK), and Richmond/Lennox/Gordon.

The courtesy title used by the Duke's eldest son and heir is Earl of Dalkeith; and that of Lord Dalkeith's eldest son and heir is Lord Eskdaill.

== Estates and residences ==
=== Family seats ===
The family seats are Bowhill House, three miles from Selkirk, representing the Scott line; Drumlanrig Castle in Dumfries and Galloway, representing the Douglas line; and Boughton House in Northamptonshire, England, representing the Montagu line. These three houses are still lived in by the family and are also open to the public. The family also owns Dalkeith Palace in Midlothian, which is let, and has owned several other country houses and castles in the past.

=== Estates ===
In the 1883 edition of John Bateman's The Great Landowners of Great Britain and Ireland, Walter Montagu Douglas Scott, 5th Duke of Buccleuch's estates were recorded as spanning 460,108 acres across England and Scotland, including 17,965 acres in Northamptonshire, 6,881 acres in Warwickshire, 1,065 acres in Huntingdonshire, 894 acres in Buckinghamshire, 369 acres in Lancashire, 7 acres in Surrey, 254,179 acres in Dumfriesshire, 104,461 acres in Roxburghshire, 60,428 acres in Selkirkshire, 3,436 acres in Midlothian, 9,091 acres in Lanarkshire, 1,000 acres in Kirkcudbrightshire, 272 acres in Peeblesshire, and 60 acres in Fife, which produced a combined annual income of £217,163. Bateman noted that the Duke of Buccleuch enjoyed an additional annual income of £14,692 arising from minerals, quarries and Granton Harbour, rendering his total annual income as approximately £231,900.

The current Duke of Buccleuch, Richard Scott, the 10th Duke, is one of the largest private landowners in Scotland with some 200,000 acres (over 80,000 hectares) and chairman of the Buccleuch Group, a holding company with interests in commercial property, rural affairs, food, and beverages. The title originally comes from a holding in the Scottish Borders, near Selkirk.

=== London residences ===
Henry Scott, 3rd Duke of Buccleuch came into possession of a grand London standalone mansion Montagu House, Whitehall through his marriage to Lady Elizabeth Montagu. Lady Elizabeth's grandfather John Montagu, 2nd Duke of Montagu had acquired the House in 1731, and she inherited the property following the deaths of her mother Mary, Duchess of Montagu in 1775 and her father George Montagu, 1st Duke of Montagu in 1790.

In 1853 the grandson of Lady Elizabeth and the 3rd Duke of Buccleuch, Walter Montagu-Douglas-Scott, 5th Duke of Buccleuch commissioned the Scottish Architect William Burn to replace the existing Montagu House with a palatial residence in the French Renaissance Chateau style. The new Montagu House was completed in 1858, and continued to serve as the London residence of the Dukes and their families until 1917, when the British government requisitioned the House during the First World War, after which it was occupied by the Ministry of Labour. In her memoirs, the 5th Duke's great-granddaughter Princess Alice, Duchess of Gloucester was critical of his decision to renew the Crown Lease of the site of Montagu House, and noted that the £120,000 spent on constructing the new Montagu House in the 1850s could have covered the cost of purchasing the freehold of another London mansion, Chesterfield House. Alice also asserted that the Duke's architect William Burn had encouraged the 5th Duke to purchase the freehold of Chesterfield House rather than renewing the lease of Montagu House.

By the end of the War John Montagu-Douglas-Scott, 7th Duke of Buccleuch had purchased the leasehold of No. 2 Grosvenor Place, which had previously been used as the London townhouse of the Dukes of Northumberland from 1873 until c. 1917. This continued to be the London residence of the Dukes of Buccleuch until Walter Montagu-Douglas-Scott, 8th Duke of Buccleuch handed over use of the property to the London Association of Scottish Societies to be used as a London headquarters and social centre for all Scotsmen serving in the armed forces during the Second World War. By 1946 No. 2 Grosvenor Place had been leased to Imperial Chemical Industries for an annual rent of just under £10,000.

Montagu House, Whitehall was demolished in 1949-50.

Following the conclusion of the Second World War, by 1950 Walter Montagu-Douglas-Scott, 8th Duke of Buccleuch had taken an apartment at No. 15 Grosvenor Square as his London residence, which he continued to occupy in 1970.

By 1970 his son John Scott, Earl of Dalkeith and his wife Jane Scott, Countess of Dalkeith maintained a London residence at No. 46 Bedford Gardens, Kensington. Following Lord Dalkeith's accession as 9th Duke of Buccleuch in 1973, he continued to maintain the house as a London residence, and reportedly owned both No. 44 and No. 46 Bedford Gardens by 1988.

== List of title holders ==
=== Feudal barons of Buccleuch (1488) ===
- David Scott (d. c. 1491/2), 1st of Buccleuch
- Walter Scott (d. c. 1504), 2nd of Buccleuch
- Walter Scott of Branxholme and Buccleuch (d. 1552), 3rd of Buccleuch
- Walter Scott (c. 1549–1574), 4th of Buccleuch
- Walter Scott (1565–1611), 1st Lord Scott of Buccleuch, 5th of Buccleuch (created Lord Scott of Buccleuch in 1606)

=== Lords Scott of Buccleuch (1606) ===
- Walter Scott (1565–1611), 1st Lord Scott of Buccleuch, son of the 4th Baron
- Walter Scott, 2nd Lord Scott of Buccleuch (d. 1633), 2nd Lord Scott of Buccleuch (created Earl of Buccleuch in 1619)

=== Earls of Buccleuch (1619) ===
- Walter Scott (d. 1633), 1st Earl of Buccleuch
- Francis Scott (1626–1651), 2nd Earl of Buccleuch
- Mary Scott (1647–1661), 3rd Countess of Buccleuch
- Anne Scott (1651–1732), 4th Countess of Buccleuch was created Duchess of Buccleuch in 1663

=== Dukes of Buccleuch, first creation (1663) ===
Also Earl of Doncaster and Baron Scott of Tynedale

- James Scott (1649–1685), Duke of Buccleuch, Duke of Monmouth, was executed for the Monmouth Rebellion and his honours forfeit.

=== Dukes of Buccleuch, second creation (1663) ===
- Anne Scott (1651–1732), 1st Duchess of Buccleuch
- Francis Scott (1695–1751), 2nd Duke of Buccleuch
- Henry Scott, 3rd Duke of Buccleuch, 5th Duke of Queensberry (1746–1812) (succeeded as Duke of Queensberry)
- Charles William Henry Montagu Scott, (1772–1819), 4th Duke of Buccleuch, 6th Duke of Queensberry, second son of the 3rd Duke
- Walter Francis Montagu Douglas Scott (1806–1884), 5th Duke of Buccleuch, 7th Duke of Queensberry
- William Henry Walter Montagu Douglas Scott (1831–1914), 6th Duke of Buccleuch, 8th Duke of Queensberry
- John Charles Montagu Douglas Scott (1864–1935), 7th Duke of Buccleuch, 9th Duke of Queensberry
- Walter John Montagu Douglas Scott (1894–1973), 8th Duke of Buccleuch, 10th Duke of Queensberry
- Walter Francis John Montagu Douglas Scott (1923–2007), 9th Duke of Buccleuch, 11th Duke of Queensberry
- Richard Walter John Montagu Douglas Scott (b. 1954), 10th Duke of Buccleuch, 12th Duke of Queensberry

The heir apparent is the present holder's son Walter John Francis Montagu Douglas Scott, Earl of Dalkeith (b. 1984)
The heir apparent's heir apparent is his son, Willoughby Ralph Montagu Douglas Scott, Lord Eskdaill (b. 2016)

== Family tree ==
Marquesses of Queensberry and Dukes of Buccleuch, Dover, Monmouth, and Queensberry

Lord Scott of Buccleuch, 1606
Walter Scott c. 1565–1611; 1st Lord Scott of Buccleuch
Earl of Buccleuch and Lord Scott of Whitchester and Eskdaill, 1619	Viscount Drumlanrig and Lord Douglas of Hawick and Tibbers, 1628; Earl of Queensberry, 1633
Walter Scott c. 1606–1633; 1st Earl of Buccleuch, etc., 2nd Lord Scott of Buccleuch	William Douglas c. 1582 – c. 1639–1640; 1st Earl of Queensberry, etc.
Francis Scott; 1626–1651; 2nd Earl of Buccleuch, etc., 3rd Lord Scott of Buccleuch	King Charles II; 1630–1685	James Douglas d. 1671; 2nd Earl of Queensberry, etc.	William Douglas d. 1673
Duke of Buccleuch (2nd creation), April 1663	Duke of Monmouth, Earl of Doncaster, and Baron Scott of Tynedale, February 1663; Duke of Buccleuch (1st creation), Earl of Dalkeith (1st creation), and Lord Scott of Whitchester and Eskdale, April 1663	Marquess of Queensberry, Earl of Drumlanrig and Sanquhar, Viscount of Nith, Torthorwald and Ross, 1682; Duke of Queensberry, Marquess of Dumfriesshire, 1684	Baronet, of Kelhead, 1668
Mary Scott; 1647–1661; 3rd Countess of Buccleuch, etc., 4th Lady Scott of Buccleuch	Anne Scott; 1651–1732; 1st Duchess of Buccleuch, 4th Countess of Buccleuch, etc., 5th Lady Scott of Buccleuch	James Scott; 1649–1685; Duke of Monmouth, etc., Duke of Buccleuch, etc.	William Douglas; 1637–1695; 1st Duke of Queensberry, etc., 1st Marquess of Queensberry, etc., 3rd Earl of Queensberry, etc.	Catherine Douglas	James Douglas; 1639–1708; 1st Baronet of Kelhead
Dukedoms of Monmouth and Buccleuch and subsidiary titles forfeit, 1685
Duke of Dover, Marquess of Beverley, and Baron Ripon, 1708	Earl of March (Scotland, 4th creation), Viscount of Peebles, and Lord Douglas of Neidpath, Lyne and Munard, 1697
James Scott; 1674–1705 styled Earl of Dalkeith	James Douglas; 1662–1711; 2nd Duke of Queensberry, etc., 1st Duke of Dover, etc., 2nd Marquess of Queensberry, etc.	William Douglas; 1673–1705; 1st Earl of March, etc.	Anne Douglas d. 1700	William Douglas d. 1733; 2nd Baronet of Kelhead
Earl of Doncaster and Baron Scott of Tynedale, restored, 1743	Earl of Solway, Viscount of Tiberris, Lord Douglas of Lockerbie, Dalveen and Thornhill, 1706
Francis Scott; 1695–1751; 2nd Duke of Buccleuch, etc., 5th Earl of Buccleuch, etc., 6th Lord Scott of Buccleuch	Jane Douglas; 1701–1729	James Douglas; 1697–1715; 3rd Marquess of Queensberry, etc.	Charles Douglas; 1698–1778; 3rd Duke of Queensberry, etc., 2nd Duke of Dover, etc., 4th Marquess of Queensberry, etc., Earl of Solway, etc.	William Douglas; 1696–1731; 2nd Earl of March, etc.	James Wemyss; 1699–1756; 5th Earl of Wemyss, etc.	John Douglas c. 1708–1778; 3rd Baronet of Kelhead
Excluded from succession to the dukedoms of Queensberry and Dover (Note: James Douglas, 3rd Marquess of Queensberry was excluded from the line of succession to the Dukedoms of Queensberry and Dover when his father — the 2nd Duke of Queensberry — surrendered all of his titles except the Marquessate and its subsidiary titles back to the Crown and obtained a new grant with the same precedence for the surrendered titles that altered the succession to his second son and then the heirs male and female of the 1st Earl of Queensberry. The succession of the Marquessate continued in remainder to the heirs male of the 1st Earl of Queensberry.)	Dukedom of Dover and its subsidiary titles, and earldom of Solway and its subsidiary titles extinct, 1778
Francis Scott; 1721–1750 styled Earl of Dalkeith	Henry Douglas; 1722–1754 styled Earl of Drumlanrig	Charles Douglas; 1726–1756 styled Earl of Drumlanrig	William Douglas; 1724–1810; 4th Duke of Queensberry, etc., 5th Marquess of Queensberry, etc., 3rd Earl of March, etc., Earl of Ruglen	Francis Wemyss-Charteris; 1723–1808 self-styled 7th Earl of Wemyss, etc.
Henry Scott; 1746–1812; 5th Duke of Queensberry, etc., 3rd Duke of Buccleuch, etc., 7th Lord Scott of Buccleuch	Francis Wemyss Charteris; 1749–1808 styled Lord Elcho	William Douglas c. 1730–1783; 4th Baronet of Kelhead
Baron Wemyss, 1821; Earl of Wemyss attainder reversed, 1826
George Scott; 1768 styled Earl of Dalkeith	Charles William Henry Montagu-Scott; 1772–1819; 6th Duke of Queensberry, etc., 4th Duke of Buccleuch, etc., 8th Lord Scott of Buccleuch	Francis Wemyss Charteris Douglas; 1772–1853; 8th Earl of Wemyss, etc., 4th Earl of March, 1st Baron Wemyss	Charles Douglas; 1777–1837; 6th Marquess of Queensberry, etc., 5th Baronet of Kelhead	John Douglas; 1779–1856; 7th Marquess of Queensberry, etc., 6th Baronet of Kelhead
George Henry Scott; 1798–1808; Lord Scott of Whitchester	Walter Francis Montagu Douglas Scott; 1806–1884; 7th Duke of Queensberry, etc., 5th Duke of Buccleuch, etc., 8th Earl of Buccleuch, etc., 9th Lord Scott of Buccleuch	Francis Wemyss-Charteris; 1795–1883; 9th Earl of Wemyss, 5th Earl of March, 2nd Baron Wemyss	Archibald William Douglas; 1818–1858; 8th Marquess of Queensberry, etc., 7th Baronet of Kelhead
Baron Montagu of Beaulieu (UK), 1885
William Henry Walter Montagu Douglas Scott; 1831–1914; 8th Duke of Queensberry, etc., 6th Duke of Buccleuch, etc., 10th Lord Scott of Buccleuch	Henry John Montagu-Scott; 1832–1905; 1st Baron Montagu of Beaulieu	Francis Wemyss-Charteris; 1818–1914; 10th Earl of Wemyss, 6th Earl of March, 3rd Baron Wemyss	John Sholto Douglas; 1844–1900; 9th Marquess of Queensberry, etc., 8th Baronet of Kelhead
Baron Kelhead (UK), 1893
Walter Henry Montagu Douglas Scott; 1861–1886 styled Earl of Dalkeith	John Charles Montagu Douglas Scott; 1864–1935; 9th Duke of Queensberry, etc., 7th Duke of Buccleuch, etc., 11th Lord Scott of Buccleuch	John Walter Edward Douglas-Scott-Montagu; 1866–1929; 3rd Baron Montagu of Beaulieu	Hugo Richard Charteris; 1857–1937; 11th Earl of Wemyss, 7th Earl of March, 4th Baron Wemyss	Francis Archibald Douglas; 1867–1894 styled Viscount Drumlanrig, Baron Kelhead	Percy Sholto Douglas; 1868–1920; 10th Marquess of Queensberry, etc., 9th Baronet of Kelhead
Barony Kelhead extinct, 1894
Walter John Montagu-Douglas-Scott; 1894–1973; 10th Duke of Queensberry, etc., 8th Duke of Buccleuch, etc., 12th Lord Scott of Buccleuch	Hugo Charteris; 1884–1916	Francis Archibald Kelhead Douglas; 1898–1954; 11th Marquess of Queensberry, etc., 10th Baronet of Kelhead
Baron Charteris of Amisfield, 1978
Walter Francis John Montagu Douglas Scott; 1923–2007; 11th Duke of Queensberry, etc., 9th Duke of Buccleuch, etc., 13th Lord Scott of Buccleuch	Edward John Barrington Douglas-Scott-Montagu; 1926–2015; 3rd Baron Montagu of Beaulieu	Francis David Charteris; 1912–2008; 12th Earl of Wemyss, 8th Earl of March, 5th Baron Wemyss	Martin Michael Charles Charteris; 1913–1999; Baron Charteris of Amisfield	David Harrington Angus Douglas; 1929–2026; 12th Marquess of Queensberry, etc., 11th Baronet of Kelhead
Baron Charteris of Amisfield extinct, 1999
Richard Walter John Montagu Douglas Scott b. 1954; 12th Duke of Queensberry, etc., 10th Duke of Buccleuch, etc., 14th Lord Scott of Buccleuch	Ralph Douglas-Scott-Montagu b. 1961; 4th Baron Montagu of Beaulieu	Jonathan Deane Montagu-Scott b. 11 October 1975	James Charteris b. 1948; 13th Earl of Wemyss, 9th Earl of March, 6th Baron Wemyss	Sholto Francis Guy Douglas b. 1967; 13th Marquess of Queensberry, etc., 12th Baronet of Kelhead	Lord Torquil Oberon Tobias Douglas b. 1978
Heir presumptive to the Barony Montagu of Beaulieu	Heir presumptive to the Marquessate of Queensberry
Walter John Francis Montagu Douglas Scott b. 1984 styled Earl of Dalkeith	Francis Richard (Dick) Charteris b. 1984 style Lord Elcho
Heir presumptive to the Dukedom of Queensbury, etc. and the Dukedom of Buccleuch, etc.	Heir apparent to the earldoms of Wemyss and March
Willoughby Ralph Montagu Douglas Scott b. 2016 styled Lord Eskdaill

Line of succession (simplified)
- Walter Montagu Douglas Scott, 5th Duke of Buccleuch, 7th Duke of Queensberry (1806–1884)
  - William Montagu Douglas Scott, 6th Duke of Buccleuch, 8th Duke of Queensberry (1831–1914)
    - John Montagu Douglas Scott, 7th Duke of Buccleuch, 9th Duke of Queensberry (1864–1935)
      - Walter Montagu Douglas Scott, 8th Duke of Buccleuch, 10th Duke of Queensberry (1894–1973)
        - John Montagu Douglas Scott, 9th Duke of Buccleuch, 11th Duke of Queensberry (1923–2007)
          - Richard Montagu Douglas Scott, 10th Duke of Buccleuch, 12th Duke of Queensberry (b. 1954)
            - (1). Walter Montagu Douglas Scott, Earl of Dalkeith (b. 1984)
              - (2). Willoughby Montagu Douglas Scott, Lord Eskdaill (b. 2016)
            - (3). Lord Charles David Peter Montagu Douglas Scott (b. 1987)
              - (4). Rufus Peter Francis Montagu Douglas Scott (b. 2017)
              - (5). Wilfred Richard Montagu Douglas Scott (b. 2019)
              - (6). Milo William Montagu Douglas Scott (b. 2022)
          - (7). Lord William Henry John Montagu Douglas Scott (b. 1957)
          - (8). Lord Damian Torquil Francis Charles Montagu Douglas Scott (b. 1970)
            - (9). Alexander Edward James Montagu Douglas Scott (b. 2002)
            - (10). Orlando John Sebastian Montagu Douglas Scott (b. 2009)
      - Lord William Montagu-Douglas-Scott (1896–1958)
        - male issue in line
    - Lord George William Montagu Douglas Scott (1866–1947)
      - John Henry Montagu Douglas Scott (1911–1991)
        - male issue in line
      - Claud Everard Walter Montagu Douglas Scott (1915–1994)
        - male issue in line
    - Lord Herbert Andrew Montagu Douglas Scott (1872–1943)
      - Andrew Montagu Douglas Scott (1906–1971)
        - male issue in line
  - Henry Douglas-Scott-Montagu, 1st Baron Montagu of Beaulieu (1832–1905)
    - Barons Montagu of Beaulieu

== Coats of arms ==
Ancestral Scott arms: Or on a bend azure a mullet of six points between two crescents of the field

Arms of the Duke of Monmouth & Buccleuch

Arms of the 3rd Duke of Buccleuch

Arms of the 4th Duke of Buccleuch

Arms of the 5th Duke of Buccleuch

Arms of the 8th to 10th Duke of Buccleuch

Coat of arms of the Duke of Buccleuch
Adopted 1935 Coronet A coronet of a Duke Crest A Stag trippant proper armed and attired Or Escutcheon Quarterly: 1st grandquarter for the Earldom of Doncaster: the arms of King Charles II debruised by a Baton Sinister Argent; 2nd grandquarter for the Dukedom of Argyll: quarterly, 1st and 4th: Gyronny of eight Or and Sable (Campbell); 2nd and 3rd: Argent a Lymphad sails furled Sable flags and pennons flying Gules and oars in action of the second (Lorne); 3rd grandquarter for the Dukedom of Queensberry: quarterly, 1st and 4th: Argent a Heart Gules crowned with an Imperial Crown Or on a Chief Azure three Mullets of the field (Douglas); 2nd and 3rd, Azure a Bend between six Cross Crosslets fitchée Or (Mar); the whole of this grandquarter within a Bordure Or charged with a double Tressure flory-counter-flory Gules; 4th grandquarter for the Dukedom of Montagu: quarterly, 1st: Argent three Fusils conjoined in fess Gules a Bordure Sable (Montagu); 2nd: Or an Eagle displayed Vert beaked and membered Gules (Monthermer); 3rd: Sable a Lion rampant Argent on a Canton of the last a Cross Gules (Churchill); 4th: Argent a Chevron Gules between three Caps of Maintenance their fronts turned to the sinister Azure furred Ermine (Brudenell); over the grandquarters at the fess point an Inescutcheon Or on a Bend Azure a Mullet of six points between two Crescents of the field (Scott). Supporters On either side a Female Figure proper habited from the waist downwards in a Kirtle Azure gathered up at the knees the arms and bosom uncovered around the shoulders a Flowing Mantle as before suspended by the exterior hand girdle and sandals Gules and her head adorned with a Plume of three Ostrich Feathers Argent Motto Amo ("I Love")

== In media ==
- Nick Carraway, the narrator of F. Scott Fitzgerald's The Great Gatsby, says his family has "a tradition that we're descended from the Dukes of Buccleuch", but then points out that this is not true.

== See also ==
- Buccleuch, Scottish Borders
- Clan Douglas
- Clan Scott
- Clan Stewart as they are descendants of the Duke of Monmouth, the eldest illegitimate son of King Charles II
- Duke of Buccleugh (ship) – several ships with that name
