= Duke of Queensberry =

Title in the Peerage of Scotland

Dukedom of Queensberry held with Dukedom of Buccleuch
- Arms of the Dukes of Buccleuch, who have held the title of Duke of Queensberry since 1810
- Creation date: 3 February 1684
- Created by: Charles II
- Peerage: Peerage of Scotland
- First holder: William Douglas, 1st Marquess of Queensberry
- Present holder: Richard Scott, 12th Duke
- Heir apparent: Walter Scott, Earl of Dalkeith
- Remainder to: the 2nd Duke's heirs of entail, male or female, descended from the body of the 1st Earl of Queensberry
- Subsidiary titles: Marquess of Dumfriesshire; Earl of Drumlanrig and Sanquhar; Viscount of Nith, Tortholwald and Ross; Lord Douglas of Kinmount, Middlebie and Dornock
- Seats: Bowhill House; Drumlanrig Castle; Dumfries and Galloway; Boughton House; Dalkeith Palace*
- Former seat: Montagu House
- Motto: FORWARD
- *Dalkeith Palace remains in the ownership of the Dukes, but is not presently inhabited by them or their family.

The title Duke of Queensberry was created in the Peerage of Scotland on 3 February 1684 along with the subsidiary title Marquess of Dumfriesshire for William Douglas, Marquess of Queensberry. The Dukedom was held along with the Marquessate of Queensberry until the death of the 4th Duke (and 5th Marquess) in 1810, when the Marquessate was inherited by Sir Charles Douglas of Kelhead, 5th Baronet, while the Dukedom was inherited by the 3rd Duke of Buccleuch. Since then the title of Duke of Queensberry has been held by the Dukes of Buccleuch.

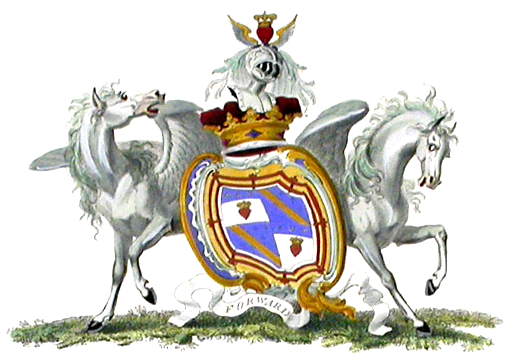
Arms of the 1st, 2nd and 3rd Dukes of Queensberry.

In 1708, the 2nd Duke was created Duke of Dover (along with the subsidiary titles Marquess of Beverley and Baron Ripon) in the Peerage of Great Britain, but these titles became extinct upon the death of the 2nd Duke of Dover in 1778. In 1945, King George VI offered Winston Churchill the title of Duke of Dover, which he declined.

Several subsidiary titles are associated with the Dukedom of Queensberry, namely Marquess of Dumfriesshire (1683), Earl of Drumlanrig and Sanquhar (1682), Viscount of Nith, Tortholwald and Ross (1682) and Lord Douglas of Kinmount, Middlebie and Dornock (1682) (all in the Peerage of Scotland).

The seat of the Dukes is at Drumlanrig Castle, built by the 1st Duke of Queensberry.

== Dukes of Queensberry (1684) ==
Other titles: Marquess of Dumfriesshire, Earl of Drumlanrig and Sanquhar, Viscount of Nith, Torthorwald and Ross and Lord Douglas of Kinmount, Middlebie and Dornock (1684)
Other titles (1st to 4th Dukes): Marquess of Queensberry (1682), Earl of Queensberry (1633), Earl of Drumlanrig and Sanquhar (1682), Viscount of Drumlanrig (1628), Viscount of Nith, Torthorwald and Ross (1682), Lord Douglas of Hawick and Tibbers (1628) and Lord Douglas of Kinmount, Middlebie and Dornock (1682)

- William Douglas, 1st Duke of Queensberry (1637–1695) was, until February 1684, Marquess of Queensberry
- James Douglas, 2nd Duke of Queensberry, 1st Duke of Dover (1662–1711), eldest son of the 1st Duke

Other titles: Duke of Dover, Marquess of Beverley and Baron Ripon (1708)

  - William Douglas, Earl of Drumlanrig (1696), eldest son of the 2nd Duke, died in infancy
  - James Douglas, 3rd Marquess of Queensberry (1697–1715), second son of the 2nd Duke, was an imbecile and was excluded from the succession to the dukedom only by a charter of novodamus and then died without issue

Other titles (3rd Duke): Earl of Solway, Viscount Tibbers and Lord Douglas of Lockerby, Dalveen and Thornhill (1706)

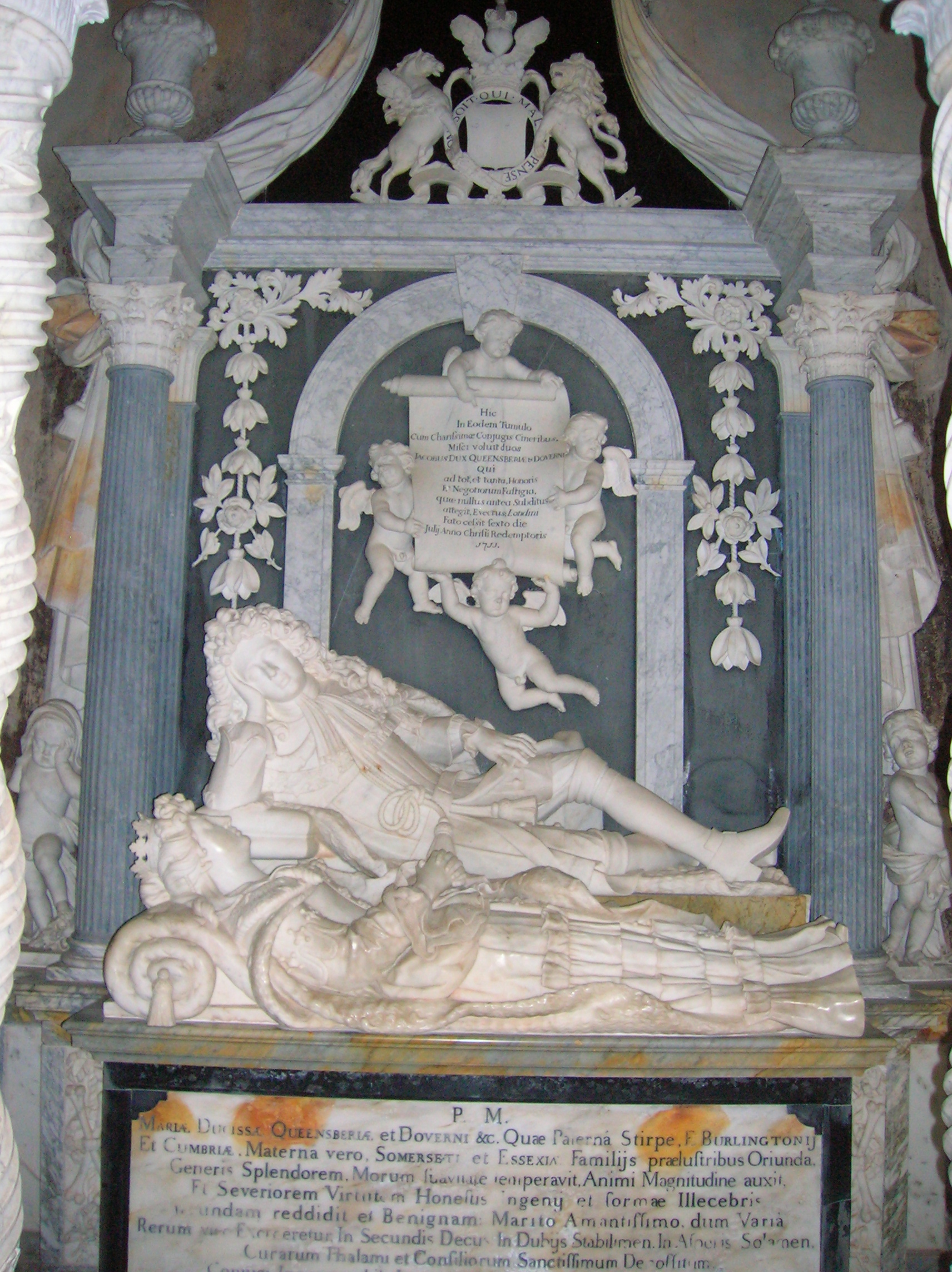
Memorial to James Douglas, 2nd Duke of Queensberry, and Mary, his wife at Durisdeer.

- Charles Douglas, 3rd Duke of Queensberry, 2nd Duke of Dover (1698–1778), third son of the 2nd Duke, succeeded his father due to special remainder and died without issue
  - Henry Douglas, Earl of Drumlanrig (1722–1754), elder son of the 3rd Duke, died without issue
  - Charles Douglas, Earl of Drumlanrig (1726–1756), younger son of the 3rd Duke, died without issue

Other titles (4th Duke): Earl of Ruglen (1697), Earl of March (1697), Viscount of Riccartoun (1697), Viscount of Peebles (1697), Lord Hillhouse (1697), Lord Douglas of Neidpath, Lyne and Munard (1697) and Baron Douglas, of Amesbury in the county of Wiltshire (GB, 1786)

- William Douglas, 4th Duke of Queensberry (1724–1810), great-grandson of the 1st Duke via the Earls of March

Other titles (5th Duke onwards): Duke of Buccleuch (1663), Earl of Buccleuch (1619), Earl of Doncaster, in the county of York (En 1663, restored 1743), Earl of Dalkeith (1663), Lord Scott of Buccleuch (1606), Baron Scott of Whitchester and Eskdaill (1619), Baron Scott of Tindall, in the county of Northumberland (En 1663, restored 1743) and Lord Scott of Whitchester and Eskdale (1663)

- Henry Scott, 3rd Duke of Buccleuch, 5th Duke of Queensberry (1746–1812), great-grandson of the 2nd Duke of Queensberry
  - George Scott, Earl of Dalkeith (1768), eldest son of the 3rd Duke of Buccleuch, died in infancy
- Charles William Henry Montagu-Scott, 4th Duke of Buccleuch, 6th Duke of Queensberry (1772–1819), second son of the 3rd Duke
  - George Henry Scott, Lord Scott of Whitchester (1798–1808), eldest son of the 4th Duke, died young
- Walter Francis Montagu Douglas Scott, 5th Duke of Buccleuch, 7th Duke of Queensberry (1806–1884), second son of the 4th Duke
- William Henry Walter Montagu Douglas Scott, 6th Duke of Buccleuch, 8th Duke of Queensberry (1831–1914), eldest son of the 5th Duke
  - Walter Henry Montagu Douglas Scott, Earl of Dalkeith (1861–1886), eldest son of the 6th Duke, died unmarried
- John Charles Montagu Douglas Scott, 7th Duke of Buccleuch, 9th Duke of Queensberry (1864–1935), second son of the 6th Duke
- Walter John Montagu Douglas Scott, 8th Duke of Buccleuch, 10th Duke of Queensberry (1894–1973), eldest son of the 7th Duke
- Walter Francis John Montagu Douglas Scott, 9th Duke of Buccleuch, 11th Duke of Queensberry (1923–2007), only son of the 8th Duke
- Richard Walter John Montagu Douglas Scott, 10th Duke of Buccleuch, 12th Duke of Queensberry (born 1954), eldest son of the 9th Duke

== Family Tree ==
Marquesses of Queensberry and Dukes of Buccleuch, Dover, Monmouth, and Queensberry

Lord Scott of Buccleuch, 1606
Walter Scott c. 1565–1611; 1st Lord Scott of Buccleuch
Earl of Buccleuch and Lord Scott of Whitchester and Eskdaill, 1619	Viscount Drumlanrig and Lord Douglas of Hawick and Tibbers, 1628; Earl of Queensberry, 1633
Walter Scott c. 1606–1633; 1st Earl of Buccleuch, etc., 2nd Lord Scott of Buccleuch	William Douglas c. 1582 – c. 1639–1640; 1st Earl of Queensberry, etc.
Francis Scott; 1626–1651; 2nd Earl of Buccleuch, etc., 3rd Lord Scott of Buccleuch	King Charles II; 1630–1685	James Douglas d. 1671; 2nd Earl of Queensberry, etc.	William Douglas d. 1673
Duke of Buccleuch (2nd creation), April 1663	Duke of Monmouth, Earl of Doncaster, and Baron Scott of Tynedale, February 1663; Duke of Buccleuch (1st creation), Earl of Dalkeith (1st creation), and Lord Scott of Whitchester and Eskdale, April 1663	Marquess of Queensberry, Earl of Drumlanrig and Sanquhar, Viscount of Nith, Torthorwald and Ross, 1682; Duke of Queensberry, Marquess of Dumfriesshire, 1684	Baronet, of Kelhead, 1668
Mary Scott; 1647–1661; 3rd Countess of Buccleuch, etc., 4th Lady Scott of Buccleuch	Anne Scott; 1651–1732; 1st Duchess of Buccleuch, 4th Countess of Buccleuch, etc., 5th Lady Scott of Buccleuch	James Scott; 1649–1685; Duke of Monmouth, etc., Duke of Buccleuch, etc.	William Douglas; 1637–1695; 1st Duke of Queensberry, etc., 1st Marquess of Queensberry, etc., 3rd Earl of Queensberry, etc.	Catherine Douglas	James Douglas; 1639–1708; 1st Baronet of Kelhead
Dukedoms of Monmouth and Buccleuch and subsidiary titles forfeit, 1685
Duke of Dover, Marquess of Beverley, and Baron Ripon, 1708	Earl of March (Scotland, 4th creation), Viscount of Peebles, and Lord Douglas of Neidpath, Lyne and Munard, 1697
James Scott; 1674–1705 styled Earl of Dalkeith	James Douglas; 1662–1711; 2nd Duke of Queensberry, etc., 1st Duke of Dover, etc., 2nd Marquess of Queensberry, etc.	William Douglas; 1673–1705; 1st Earl of March, etc.	Anne Douglas d. 1700	William Douglas d. 1733; 2nd Baronet of Kelhead
Earl of Doncaster and Baron Scott of Tynedale, restored, 1743	Earl of Solway, Viscount of Tiberris, Lord Douglas of Lockerbie, Dalveen and Thornhill, 1706
Francis Scott; 1695–1751; 2nd Duke of Buccleuch, etc., 5th Earl of Buccleuch, etc., 6th Lord Scott of Buccleuch	Jane Douglas; 1701–1729	James Douglas; 1697–1715; 3rd Marquess of Queensberry, etc.	Charles Douglas; 1698–1778; 3rd Duke of Queensberry, etc., 2nd Duke of Dover, etc., 4th Marquess of Queensberry, etc., Earl of Solway, etc.	William Douglas; 1696–1731; 2nd Earl of March, etc.	James Wemyss; 1699–1756; 5th Earl of Wemyss, etc.	John Douglas c. 1708–1778; 3rd Baronet of Kelhead
Excluded from succession to the dukedoms of Queensberry and Dover (Note: James Douglas, 3rd Marquess of Queensberry was excluded from the line of succession to the Dukedoms of Queensberry and Dover when his father — the 2nd Duke of Queensberry — surrendered all of his titles except the Marquessate and its subsidiary titles back to the Crown and obtained a new grant with the same precedence for the surrendered titles that altered the succession to his second son and then the heirs male and female of the 1st Earl of Queensberry. The succession of the Marquessate continued in remainder to the heirs male of the 1st Earl of Queensberry.)	Dukedom of Dover and its subsidiary titles, and earldom of Solway and its subsidiary titles extinct, 1778
Francis Scott; 1721–1750 styled Earl of Dalkeith	Henry Douglas; 1722–1754 styled Earl of Drumlanrig	Charles Douglas; 1726–1756 styled Earl of Drumlanrig	William Douglas; 1724–1810; 4th Duke of Queensberry, etc., 5th Marquess of Queensberry, etc., 3rd Earl of March, etc., Earl of Ruglen	Francis Wemyss-Charteris; 1723–1808 self-styled 7th Earl of Wemyss, etc.
Henry Scott; 1746–1812; 5th Duke of Queensberry, etc., 3rd Duke of Buccleuch, etc., 7th Lord Scott of Buccleuch	Francis Wemyss Charteris; 1749–1808 styled Lord Elcho	William Douglas c. 1730–1783; 4th Baronet of Kelhead
Baron Wemyss, 1821; Earl of Wemyss attainder reversed, 1826
George Scott; 1768 styled Earl of Dalkeith	Charles William Henry Montagu-Scott; 1772–1819; 6th Duke of Queensberry, etc., 4th Duke of Buccleuch, etc., 8th Lord Scott of Buccleuch	Francis Wemyss Charteris Douglas; 1772–1853; 8th Earl of Wemyss, etc., 4th Earl of March, 1st Baron Wemyss	Charles Douglas; 1777–1837; 6th Marquess of Queensberry, etc., 5th Baronet of Kelhead	John Douglas; 1779–1856; 7th Marquess of Queensberry, etc., 6th Baronet of Kelhead
George Henry Scott; 1798–1808; Lord Scott of Whitchester	Walter Francis Montagu Douglas Scott; 1806–1884; 7th Duke of Queensberry, etc., 5th Duke of Buccleuch, etc., 8th Earl of Buccleuch, etc., 9th Lord Scott of Buccleuch	Francis Wemyss-Charteris; 1795–1883; 9th Earl of Wemyss, 5th Earl of March, 2nd Baron Wemyss	Archibald William Douglas; 1818–1858; 8th Marquess of Queensberry, etc., 7th Baronet of Kelhead
Baron Montagu of Beaulieu (UK), 1885
William Henry Walter Montagu Douglas Scott; 1831–1914; 8th Duke of Queensberry, etc., 6th Duke of Buccleuch, etc., 10th Lord Scott of Buccleuch	Henry John Montagu-Scott; 1832–1905; 1st Baron Montagu of Beaulieu	Francis Wemyss-Charteris; 1818–1914; 10th Earl of Wemyss, 6th Earl of March, 3rd Baron Wemyss	John Sholto Douglas; 1844–1900; 9th Marquess of Queensberry, etc., 8th Baronet of Kelhead
Baron Kelhead (UK), 1893
Walter Henry Montagu Douglas Scott; 1861–1886 styled Earl of Dalkeith	John Charles Montagu Douglas Scott; 1864–1935; 9th Duke of Queensberry, etc., 7th Duke of Buccleuch, etc., 11th Lord Scott of Buccleuch	John Walter Edward Douglas-Scott-Montagu; 1866–1929; 3rd Baron Montagu of Beaulieu	Hugo Richard Charteris; 1857–1937; 11th Earl of Wemyss, 7th Earl of March, 4th Baron Wemyss	Francis Archibald Douglas; 1867–1894 styled Viscount Drumlanrig, Baron Kelhead	Percy Sholto Douglas; 1868–1920; 10th Marquess of Queensberry, etc., 9th Baronet of Kelhead
Barony Kelhead extinct, 1894
Walter John Montagu-Douglas-Scott; 1894–1973; 10th Duke of Queensberry, etc., 8th Duke of Buccleuch, etc., 12th Lord Scott of Buccleuch	Hugo Charteris; 1884–1916	Francis Archibald Kelhead Douglas; 1898–1954; 11th Marquess of Queensberry, etc., 10th Baronet of Kelhead
Baron Charteris of Amisfield, 1978
Walter Francis John Montagu Douglas Scott; 1923–2007; 11th Duke of Queensberry, etc., 9th Duke of Buccleuch, etc., 13th Lord Scott of Buccleuch	Edward John Barrington Douglas-Scott-Montagu; 1926–2015; 3rd Baron Montagu of Beaulieu	Francis David Charteris; 1912–2008; 12th Earl of Wemyss, 8th Earl of March, 5th Baron Wemyss	Martin Michael Charles Charteris; 1913–1999; Baron Charteris of Amisfield	David Harrington Angus Douglas; 1929–2026; 12th Marquess of Queensberry, etc., 11th Baronet of Kelhead
Baron Charteris of Amisfield extinct, 1999
Richard Walter John Montagu Douglas Scott b. 1954; 12th Duke of Queensberry, etc., 10th Duke of Buccleuch, etc., 14th Lord Scott of Buccleuch	Ralph Douglas-Scott-Montagu b. 1961; 4th Baron Montagu of Beaulieu	Jonathan Deane Montagu-Scott b. 11 October 1975	James Charteris b. 1948; 13th Earl of Wemyss, 9th Earl of March, 6th Baron Wemyss	Sholto Francis Guy Douglas b. 1967; 13th Marquess of Queensberry, etc., 12th Baronet of Kelhead	Lord Torquil Oberon Tobias Douglas b. 1978
Heir presumptive to the Barony Montagu of Beaulieu	Heir presumptive to the Marquessate of Queensberry
Walter John Francis Montagu Douglas Scott b. 1984 styled Earl of Dalkeith	Francis Richard (Dick) Charteris b. 1984 style Lord Elcho
Heir presumptive to the Dukedom of Queensbury, etc. and the Dukedom of Buccleuch, etc.	Heir apparent to the earldoms of Wemyss and March
Willoughby Ralph Montagu Douglas Scott b. 2016 styled Lord Eskdaill

== Coat of arms ==
Coat of arms of the Duke of Buccleuch and Duke of Queensberry
Adopted 1935 Coronet A coronet of a Duke Crest A Stag trippant proper armed and attired Or Escutcheon Quarterly: 1st grandquarter for the Earldom of Doncaster: the arms of King Charles II debruised by a Baton Sinister Argent; 2nd grandquarter for the Dukedom of Argyll: quarterly, 1st and 4th: Gyronny of eight Or and Sable (Campbell); 2nd and 3rd: Argent a Lymphad sails furled Sable flags and pennons flying Gules and oars in action of the second (Lorne); 3rd grandquarter for the Dukedom of Queensberry: quarterly, 1st and 4th: Argent a Heart Gules crowned with an Imperial Crown Or on a Chief Azure three Mullets of the field (Douglas); 2nd and 3rd, Azure a Bend between six Cross Crosslets fitchée Or (Mar); the whole of this grandquarter within a Bordure Or charged with a double Tressure flory-counter-flory Gules; 4th grandquarter for the Dukedom of Montagu: quarterly, 1st: Argent three Fusils conjoined in fess Gules a Bordure Sable (Montagu); 2nd: Or an Eagle displayed Vert beaked and membered Gules (Monthermer); 3rd: Sable a Lion rampant Argent on a Canton of the last a Cross Gules (Churchill); 4th: Argent a Chevron Gules between three Caps of Maintenance their fronts turned to the sinister Azure furred Ermine (Brudenell); over the grandquarters at the fess point an Inescutcheon Or on a Bend Azure a Mullet of six points between two Crescents of the field (Scott). Supporters On either side a Female Figure proper habited from the waist downwards in a Kirtle Azure gathered up at the knees the arms and bosom uncovered around the shoulders a Flowing Mantle as before suspended by the exterior hand girdle and sandals Gules and her head adorned with a Plume of three Ostrich Feathers Argent Motto Amo ("I Love")

== See also ==
- Marquess of Queensberry
