= Marquess of Queensberry =

Title in the Peerage of Scotland

Marquessate of Queensberry
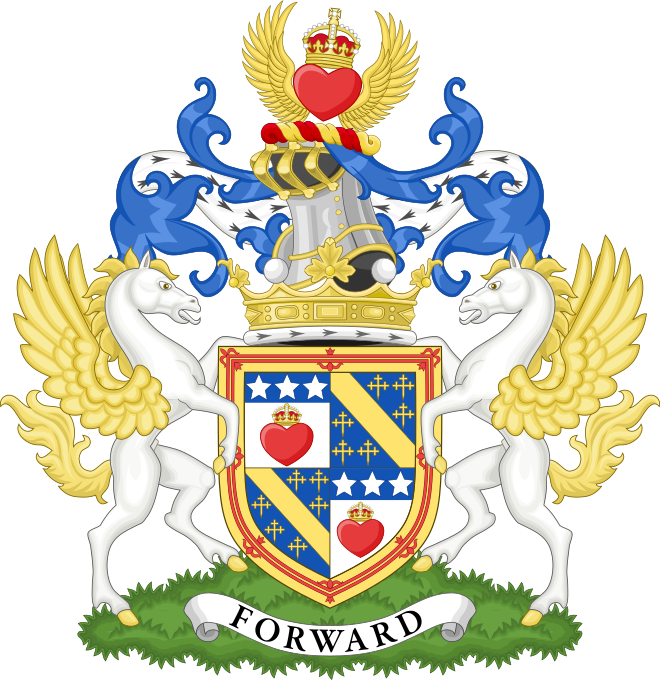
- Arms: Quarterly: 1st & 4th, Argent, a Human's Heart Gules, imperially crowned Or, on a Chief Azure, three Mullets of the field (for Douglas); 2nd & 3rd, Azure, a bend between six Crosses-Crosslet fitchée Or (for Mar); all within a Bordure Or, charged with a Double Tressure flory counterflory Gules (for Scotland). Crest: A Human Heart Gules, imperially crowned proper, within two Wings Or. Supporters: On either side a Pegasus Argent, winged crined and unguled Or.
- Creation date: 11 February 1682
- Created by: Charles II of Scotland
- Peerage: Peerage of Scotland
- First holder: William Douglas, 1st Marquess of Queensberry
- Present holder: Sholto Douglas, 13th Marquess of Queensberry
- Heir presumptive: Lord Torquil Douglas
- Remainder to: heirs male whatsoever of the grantee
- Subsidiary titles: Earl of Queensberry; Viscount Drumlanrig; Lord Douglas of Hawick & Tibbers; Baronet of Kelhead
- Status: Extant
- Former seat: Kinmount House
- Motto: FORWARD

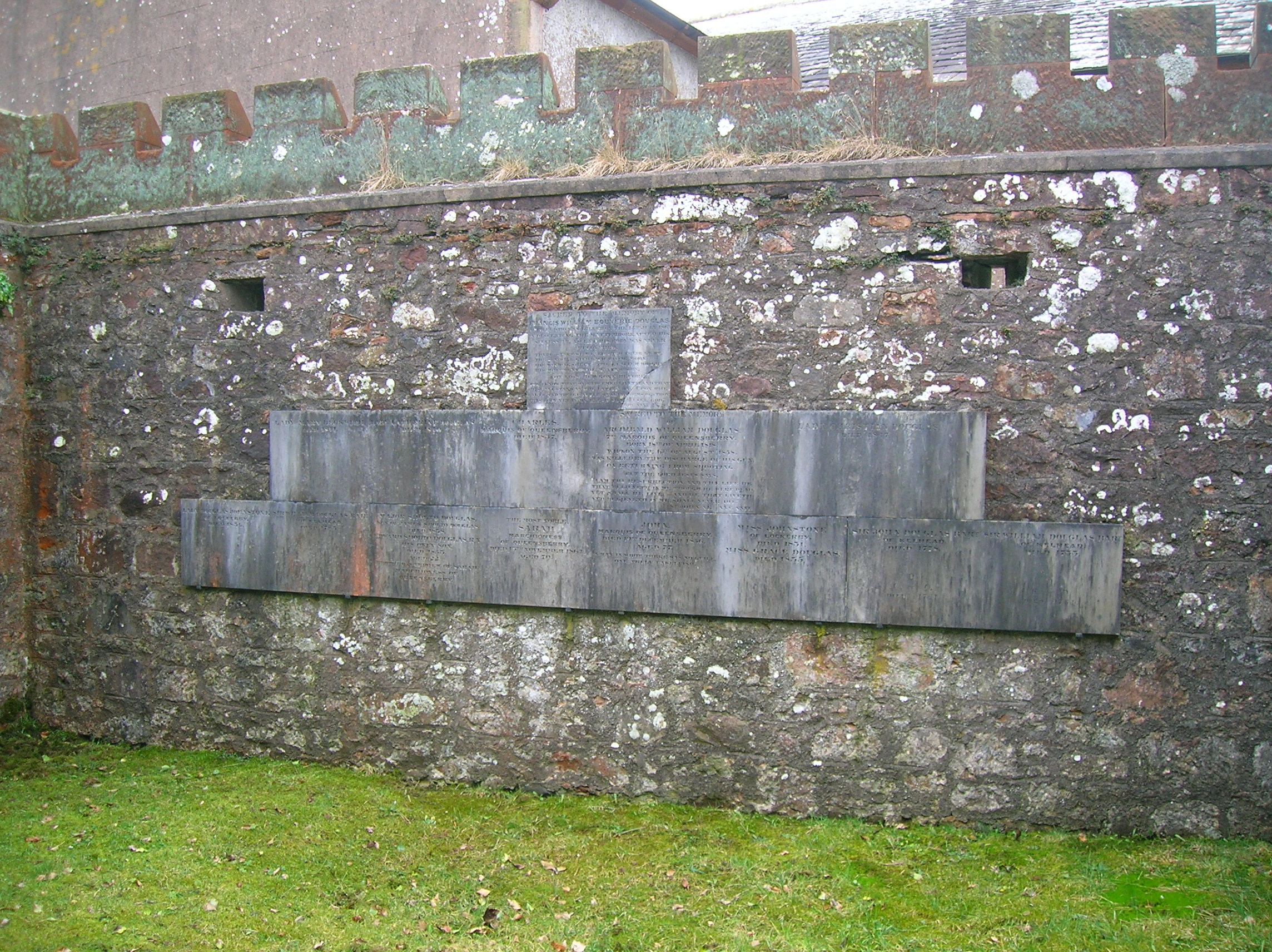
Memorial plaques at the Douglas Family Mausoleum, Cummertrees Parish Church

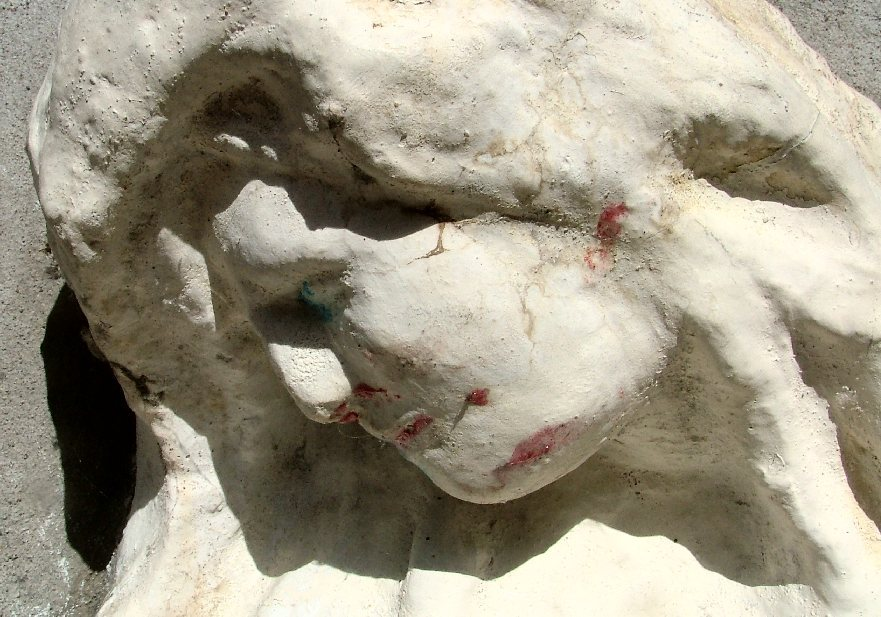
The Queensberry Monument Dumfries

Marquess of Queensberry is a title in the Peerage of Scotland. The title has been held since its creation in 1682 by a member of the Douglas family. The Marquesses also held the title of Duke of Queensberry from 1684 to 1810, when it was inherited by the Duke of Buccleuch.

== History ==
The feudal barony of Drumlanrig was held by Sir William Douglas, illegitimate son of the 2nd Earl of Douglas and Mar, some time before 1427, when he died. His descendant William Douglas, 9th of Drumlanrig, was created the 1st Earl of Queensberry in 1633.

The subsidiary titles of Lord Queensberry are: Earl of Queensberry (created 1633), Viscount Drumlanrig (1628) and Lord Douglas of Hawick and Tibbers (1628), all in the peerage of Scotland. He is also a Scottish baronet, styled "of Kelhead", created 26 February 1668, so the 6th Marquess was the 5th Baronet. The courtesy title used by Lord Queensberry's eldest son and heir is Viscount Drumlanrig. There is no special courtesy title for Lord Drumlanrig's eldest son and heir.

The family seat of the Marquesses of Queensberry was Kinmount House in the parish of Cummertrees, south Scotland, which was sold by the 9th Marquess in 1896. The traditional burial place of the Marquesses of Queensberry is the Douglas family mausoleum at Cummertrees Parish Church.

The 9th Marquess is particularly well known because of the rules of boxing that were named after him (the Marquess of Queensberry rules), and for his litigious interaction with Oscar Wilde.

On 22 June 1893, Queen Victoria raised Francis Archibald, Viscount Drumlanrig, the heir of the 9th Marquess, to the peerage of the United Kingdom as Baron Kelhead. Francis, Lord Drumlanrig, died without descendants the following year and the title "Baron Kelhead" became extinct.

== Lairds of Drumlanrig ==
- William Douglas, 1st of Drumlanrig (died 1427)
- William Douglas, 2nd of Drumlanrig (died 1458)
- William Douglas, 3rd of Drumlanrig (died 1464)
- William Douglas, 4th of Drumlanrig (died 1484)
- James Douglas, 5th of Drumlanrig (died 1498)
- William Douglas, 6th of Drumlanrig (died 1513)
- James Douglas, 7th of Drumlanrig (died 1578)
- James Douglas, 8th of Drumlanrig (died 1615)
- William Douglas, 9th of Drumlanrig, 1st Earl of Queensberry (died 1640) (became Earl of Queensberry in 1633)

== Earls of Queensberry (1633) ==
- William Douglas, 1st Earl of Queensberry (died 8 March 1639/40)
- James Douglas, 2nd Earl of Queensberry (died 1671)
- William Douglas, 3rd Earl of Queensberry (1637–1695) (became Marquess of Queensberry in 1682, and Duke of Queensberry in 1684)

== Marquesses (1682) and Dukes of Queensberry (1684) ==
- William Douglas, 1st Duke of Queensberry (1637–1695)
- James Douglas, 2nd Duke of Queensberry (1672–1711) (became Duke of Dover in 1708)
  - James Douglas, 3rd Marquess of Queensberry, (1697–1715)
- Charles Douglas, 3rd Duke of Queensberry, 4th Marquess of Queensberry (1698–1778) (Dukedom of Dover extinct in 1778)
- William Douglas, 4th Duke of Queensberry, 5th Marquess of Queensberry (1725–1810)

The 2nd Duke of Queensberry surrendered all of his titles except the Marquessate and its subsidiary titles to the Crown and obtained a new grant under the same precedence (1684) with remainder to the Dukedom and those subsidiary titles bypassing his second son to his third son and further to the heirs male and female of the 1st Earl of Queensberry. Upon his death the Marquessate passed to James Douglas, 3rd Marquess and a homicidal maniac known as "the Cannibalistic Idiot." He was excluded from his father's titles after the duke's death, which instead passed to Charles Douglas, 3rd Duke. The 3rd Duke also succeeded as Marquess upon the latter's death at age 17.

The Dukedom of Queensberry passed by special remainder to the heirs male or female of the 1st Earl of Queensberry who was Henry Scott, 3rd Duke of Buccleuch, son of Francis Scott, Earl of Dalkeith through Lady Jean Douglas (married to Francis Scott, 2nd Duke of Buccleuch) who was eldest daughter surviving infancy of the 2nd Duke of Queensberry.

== Marquesses of Queensberry from 1810 (cont. 1682) ==
- Charles Douglas, 6th Marquess of Queensberry (1777–1837)
- John Douglas, 7th Marquess of Queensberry (1779–1856)
- Archibald William Douglas, 8th Marquess of Queensberry (1818–1858)
- John Sholto Douglas, 9th Marquess of Queensberry (1844–1900)
- Percy Sholto Douglas, 10th Marquess of Queensberry (1868–1920)
- Francis Archibald Kelhead Douglas, 11th Marquess of Queensberry (1896–1954)
- David Harrington Angus Douglas, 12th Marquess of Queensberry (1929–2026)
- Sholto Francis Guy Douglas, 13th Marquess of Queensberry (born 1967).

The heir presumptive is the current holder's brother Lord Torquil Oberon Tobias Douglas (born 1978).

== Baronets, of Kelhead (26 February 1668) ==
See Douglas baronets

- Sir James Douglas, 1st Baronet (1639–1708)
- Sir William Douglas, 2nd Baronet (died 1733)
- Sir John Douglas, 3rd Baronet (died 1778)
- Sir William Douglas, 4th Baronet (died 1783)
- Charles Douglas, 6th Marquess of Queensberry (1777–1837)

See above for further succession

== Family tree and line of succession ==
Marquesses of Queensberry and Dukes of Buccleuch, Dover, Monmouth, and Queensberry

Lord Scott of Buccleuch, 1606
Walter Scott c. 1565–1611; 1st Lord Scott of Buccleuch
Earl of Buccleuch and Lord Scott of Whitchester and Eskdaill, 1619	Viscount Drumlanrig and Lord Douglas of Hawick and Tibbers, 1628; Earl of Queensberry, 1633
Walter Scott c. 1606–1633; 1st Earl of Buccleuch, etc., 2nd Lord Scott of Buccleuch	William Douglas c. 1582 – c. 1639–1640; 1st Earl of Queensberry, etc.
Francis Scott; 1626–1651; 2nd Earl of Buccleuch, etc., 3rd Lord Scott of Buccleuch	King Charles II; 1630–1685	James Douglas d. 1671; 2nd Earl of Queensberry, etc.	William Douglas d. 1673
Duke of Buccleuch (2nd creation), April 1663	Duke of Monmouth, Earl of Doncaster, and Baron Scott of Tynedale, February 1663; Duke of Buccleuch (1st creation), Earl of Dalkeith (1st creation), and Lord Scott of Whitchester and Eskdale, April 1663	Marquess of Queensberry, Earl of Drumlanrig and Sanquhar, Viscount of Nith, Torthorwald and Ross, 1682; Duke of Queensberry, Marquess of Dumfriesshire, 1684	Baronet, of Kelhead, 1668
Mary Scott; 1647–1661; 3rd Countess of Buccleuch, etc., 4th Lady Scott of Buccleuch	Anne Scott; 1651–1732; 1st Duchess of Buccleuch, 4th Countess of Buccleuch, etc., 5th Lady Scott of Buccleuch	James Scott; 1649–1685; Duke of Monmouth, etc., Duke of Buccleuch, etc.	William Douglas; 1637–1695; 1st Duke of Queensberry, etc., 1st Marquess of Queensberry, etc., 3rd Earl of Queensberry, etc.	Catherine Douglas	James Douglas; 1639–1708; 1st Baronet of Kelhead
Dukedoms of Monmouth and Buccleuch and subsidiary titles forfeit, 1685
Duke of Dover, Marquess of Beverley, and Baron Ripon, 1708	Earl of March (Scotland, 4th creation), Viscount of Peebles, and Lord Douglas of Neidpath, Lyne and Munard, 1697
James Scott; 1674–1705 styled Earl of Dalkeith	James Douglas; 1662–1711; 2nd Duke of Queensberry, etc., 1st Duke of Dover, etc., 2nd Marquess of Queensberry, etc.	William Douglas; 1673–1705; 1st Earl of March, etc.	Anne Douglas d. 1700	William Douglas d. 1733; 2nd Baronet of Kelhead
Earl of Doncaster and Baron Scott of Tynedale, restored, 1743	Earl of Solway, Viscount of Tiberris, Lord Douglas of Lockerbie, Dalveen and Thornhill, 1706
Francis Scott; 1695–1751; 2nd Duke of Buccleuch, etc., 5th Earl of Buccleuch, etc., 6th Lord Scott of Buccleuch	Jane Douglas; 1701–1729	James Douglas; 1697–1715; 3rd Marquess of Queensberry, etc.	Charles Douglas; 1698–1778; 3rd Duke of Queensberry, etc., 2nd Duke of Dover, etc., 4th Marquess of Queensberry, etc., Earl of Solway, etc.	William Douglas; 1696–1731; 2nd Earl of March, etc.	James Wemyss; 1699–1756; 5th Earl of Wemyss, etc.	John Douglas c. 1708–1778; 3rd Baronet of Kelhead
Excluded from succession to the dukedoms of Queensberry and Dover (Note: James Douglas, 3rd Marquess of Queensberry was excluded from the line of succession to the Dukedoms of Queensberry and Dover when his father — the 2nd Duke of Queensberry — surrendered all of his titles except the Marquessate and its subsidiary titles back to the Crown and obtained a new grant with the same precedence for the surrendered titles that altered the succession to his second son and then the heirs male and female of the 1st Earl of Queensberry. The succession of the Marquessate continued in remainder to the heirs male of the 1st Earl of Queensberry.)	Dukedom of Dover and its subsidiary titles, and earldom of Solway and its subsidiary titles extinct, 1778
Francis Scott; 1721–1750 styled Earl of Dalkeith	Henry Douglas; 1722–1754 styled Earl of Drumlanrig	Charles Douglas; 1726–1756 styled Earl of Drumlanrig	William Douglas; 1724–1810; 4th Duke of Queensberry, etc., 5th Marquess of Queensberry, etc., 3rd Earl of March, etc., Earl of Ruglen	Francis Wemyss-Charteris; 1723–1808 self-styled 7th Earl of Wemyss, etc.
Henry Scott; 1746–1812; 5th Duke of Queensberry, etc., 3rd Duke of Buccleuch, etc., 7th Lord Scott of Buccleuch	Francis Wemyss Charteris; 1749–1808 styled Lord Elcho	William Douglas c. 1730–1783; 4th Baronet of Kelhead
Baron Wemyss, 1821; Earl of Wemyss attainder reversed, 1826
George Scott; 1768 styled Earl of Dalkeith	Charles William Henry Montagu-Scott; 1772–1819; 6th Duke of Queensberry, etc., 4th Duke of Buccleuch, etc., 8th Lord Scott of Buccleuch	Francis Wemyss Charteris Douglas; 1772–1853; 8th Earl of Wemyss, etc., 4th Earl of March, 1st Baron Wemyss	Charles Douglas; 1777–1837; 6th Marquess of Queensberry, etc., 5th Baronet of Kelhead	John Douglas; 1779–1856; 7th Marquess of Queensberry, etc., 6th Baronet of Kelhead
George Henry Scott; 1798–1808; Lord Scott of Whitchester	Walter Francis Montagu Douglas Scott; 1806–1884; 7th Duke of Queensberry, etc., 5th Duke of Buccleuch, etc., 8th Earl of Buccleuch, etc., 9th Lord Scott of Buccleuch	Francis Wemyss-Charteris; 1795–1883; 9th Earl of Wemyss, 5th Earl of March, 2nd Baron Wemyss	Archibald William Douglas; 1818–1858; 8th Marquess of Queensberry, etc., 7th Baronet of Kelhead
Baron Montagu of Beaulieu (UK), 1885
William Henry Walter Montagu Douglas Scott; 1831–1914; 8th Duke of Queensberry, etc., 6th Duke of Buccleuch, etc., 10th Lord Scott of Buccleuch	Henry John Montagu-Scott; 1832–1905; 1st Baron Montagu of Beaulieu	Francis Wemyss-Charteris; 1818–1914; 10th Earl of Wemyss, 6th Earl of March, 3rd Baron Wemyss	John Sholto Douglas; 1844–1900; 9th Marquess of Queensberry, etc., 8th Baronet of Kelhead
Baron Kelhead (UK), 1893
Walter Henry Montagu Douglas Scott; 1861–1886 styled Earl of Dalkeith	John Charles Montagu Douglas Scott; 1864–1935; 9th Duke of Queensberry, etc., 7th Duke of Buccleuch, etc., 11th Lord Scott of Buccleuch	John Walter Edward Douglas-Scott-Montagu; 1866–1929; 3rd Baron Montagu of Beaulieu	Hugo Richard Charteris; 1857–1937; 11th Earl of Wemyss, 7th Earl of March, 4th Baron Wemyss	Francis Archibald Douglas; 1867–1894 styled Viscount Drumlanrig, Baron Kelhead	Percy Sholto Douglas; 1868–1920; 10th Marquess of Queensberry, etc., 9th Baronet of Kelhead
Barony Kelhead extinct, 1894
Walter John Montagu-Douglas-Scott; 1894–1973; 10th Duke of Queensberry, etc., 8th Duke of Buccleuch, etc., 12th Lord Scott of Buccleuch	Hugo Charteris; 1884–1916	Francis Archibald Kelhead Douglas; 1898–1954; 11th Marquess of Queensberry, etc., 10th Baronet of Kelhead
Baron Charteris of Amisfield, 1978
Walter Francis John Montagu Douglas Scott; 1923–2007; 11th Duke of Queensberry, etc., 9th Duke of Buccleuch, etc., 13th Lord Scott of Buccleuch	Edward John Barrington Douglas-Scott-Montagu; 1926–2015; 3rd Baron Montagu of Beaulieu	Francis David Charteris; 1912–2008; 12th Earl of Wemyss, 8th Earl of March, 5th Baron Wemyss	Martin Michael Charles Charteris; 1913–1999; Baron Charteris of Amisfield	David Harrington Angus Douglas; 1929–2026; 12th Marquess of Queensberry, etc., 11th Baronet of Kelhead
Baron Charteris of Amisfield extinct, 1999
Richard Walter John Montagu Douglas Scott b. 1954; 12th Duke of Queensberry, etc., 10th Duke of Buccleuch, etc., 14th Lord Scott of Buccleuch	Ralph Douglas-Scott-Montagu b. 1961; 4th Baron Montagu of Beaulieu	Jonathan Deane Montagu-Scott b. 11 October 1975	James Charteris b. 1948; 13th Earl of Wemyss, 9th Earl of March, 6th Baron Wemyss	Sholto Francis Guy Douglas b. 1967; 13th Marquess of Queensberry, etc., 12th Baronet of Kelhead	Lord Torquil Oberon Tobias Douglas b. 1978
Heir presumptive to the Barony Montagu of Beaulieu	Heir presumptive to the Marquessate of Queensberry
Walter John Francis Montagu Douglas Scott b. 1984 styled Earl of Dalkeith	Francis Richard (Dick) Charteris b. 1984 style Lord Elcho
Heir presumptive to the Dukedom of Queensbury, etc. and the Dukedom of Buccleuch, etc.	Heir apparent to the earldoms of Wemyss and March
Willoughby Ralph Montagu Douglas Scott b. 2016 styled Lord Eskdaill

Line of succession (simplified)
- John Douglas, 9th Marquess of Queensberry (1844–1900)
  - Percy Douglas, 10th Marquess of Queensberry (1868–1920)
    - Francis Douglas, 11th Marquess of Queensberry (1896–1954)
      - David Douglas, 12th Marquess of Queensberry (1929–2026)
        - Sholto Francis Guy Douglas, 13th Marquess of Queensberry (b. 1967)
        - (1). Lord Torquil Oberon Tobias Douglas (b. 1978)
      - (2). Lord Gawain Archibald Francis Douglas (b. 1948)
        - (3). Jamie Sholto Francis Douglas (b. 1975)
          - (4). Nikhel Jamie Gawain Douglas (b. 2009)
  - Lord Sholto George Douglas (1872–1942)
    - Sholto Augustus Douglas (1900–1950)
      - male issue in remainder

There are other heirs in remainder to the marquessate descended from the younger heirs male of Sir William Douglas, 4th Baronet.
