= Regiment of Horse (Scotland) =

Seventeenth century Scottish cavalry unit

The Regiment of Horse was a cavalry unit active in Scotland in the late seventeenth century, which played an important role in the events of that period.

== Independent Troops of Horse, 1678–1682 ==
The regiment had its origin in three Independent Troops of Horse established on 23 September 1678, each with four officers and sixty men. The first troop to be issued with its royal warrant was commanded by the veteran Cavalier James Ogilvy, 2nd Earl of Airlie and his nephew Adam Urquhart of Meldrum, who had previously been the officers of the Lord Chancellor's Troop of the Life Guard, disbanded two years earlier. The second troop was led by two young noblemen, James Home, 5th Earl of Home and the Master of Ross. The third commission went to Captain John Graham of Claverhouse, a man of less exalted rank, but a highly regarded officer of the Dutch Life Guards, who had gained the powerful patronage of the king's brother, the Duke of York.

Although Scotland had lent military assistance to both sides in the ongoing Franco-Dutch War, the Independent Troops seem to have been raised for garrison duty in Scotland, to guard against the perceived threat of the Covenanters – committed Presbyterians who rejected any government that did not obey their religious principles, but were perhaps further radicalized by state repression. In 1679, they formed a small army and defeated an outnumbered Claverhouse at the Battle of Drumclog, but the Independent Troops played a key role in the repulse of their assault on Glasgow.

Subsequently, tensions emerged between the Independent Troops and Lieutenant-General Tam Dayell, the senior professional soldier in Scotland, who became commander in chief before the year's end. It seems that Dayell did not get on well with Airlie or Graham, and tactically, he seems to have favoured the dragoons, companies of mounted infantry armed with muskets and polearms, clad in plain hodden grey uniforms.

In 1681, Dayell had the dragoon companies combined as a regiment under his own command, the famous Scots Greys, in response, Captain Graham seems to have proposed to his patron the Duke of York that the Independent Troops of Horse should be similarly re-organized into a unified regiment.

== Regiment of Horse, 1682–1689 ==
On Christmas Day 1682, King Charles informed the Scottish Privy Council that "Our Three (formerly Independent) Troops of Horse" were "to be formed a Regt. of Horse", with John Graham of Claverhouse as Colonel. A fourth troop was added, funded by reducing the strength of each unit to around fifty men, and by demobilizing two hundred infantrymen in the foot regiments. An attempt to pay Claverhouse's salary as colonel by dismissing all the staff officers of the Scots Greys was not successful, and deepened the existing hostility between the Horse and the Dragoons.

In 1684, two more troops were added, raised from the House of Douglas and their followers. The troop commanders now included two Earls, a Lord of Parliament and a Duke's son, a concentration of aristocracy unparalleled in Scotland's other regiments at that time. Colonel Graham was still only a laird, but in 1685, his patron the Duke of York became king.

As a sign of royal favour, the regiment was renamed on 21 December 1685 as the King's Own Regiment of Horse, sometimes subsequently referred to as the Royal Regiment of Horse. Soon after, the regiment was exempted from the purview of the Inspector of the Forces alongside the Life Guard, suggesting that like the similarly named unit in England, it shared some of the prestige of the Household troops.

== Revolution and Rebellion ==
In 1688, the Scottish army marched south to defend King James against a Dutch invasion, led by his son-in-law William of Orange. Claverhouse was ennobled as Viscount Dundee, and the Royal Regiment of Horse and the Royal Scots were willing to put up a fight, but the king was discouraged by large numbers of military and political defections, and London was occupied by Dutch troops; English resistance collapsed, and James agreed to go into exile, leaving the country on 23 December.

In the confusion, it is not entirely clear what happened to the King's Own Regiment of Horse. Claverhouse remained firmly committed to King James, but his second-in-command, the Earl of Drumlanrig went over decisively to William of Orange, and was rewarded with command of the Scottish Troop in his Life Guard.

In spite of the defections among the Scottish soldiers and politicians in England, James still remained in theory as King north of the Border, where loyal commanders controlled the main fortresses, so Claverhouse and one of his troop commanders, the Earl of Balcarres, resolved to ride north in February 1689 – almost certainly accompanied by Claverhouse's own troop, and perhaps by other elements of the regiment. In March, Claverhouse's troop acted as his bodyguard at the Convention of Estates, dramatically riding out of Edinburgh with him when it became clear that the Parliament would accept William as king; in April, they formally took up arms in the name of King James.

William III had appointed Charles Douglas, 2nd Earl of Selkirk as the new commander of the King's Own Regiment of Horse, and planned to send them to fight in Ireland; but any meaningful force of troopers that remained seems to have drifted away. Some perhaps joined their old Colonel (the Royal Scots also attempted to march north), but a number may have followed Drumlanrig into the Williamite Life Guard, while others simply laid down their arms. Either way, payments of wages to the Williamite regiment ceased on 30 March 1689, marking the effective end of the Royal Regiment of Horse as a unit.
