= Charles Douglas, 3rd Duke of Queensberry =

Scottish judge and landowner

His Grace The Duke of Queensberry and Dover PC
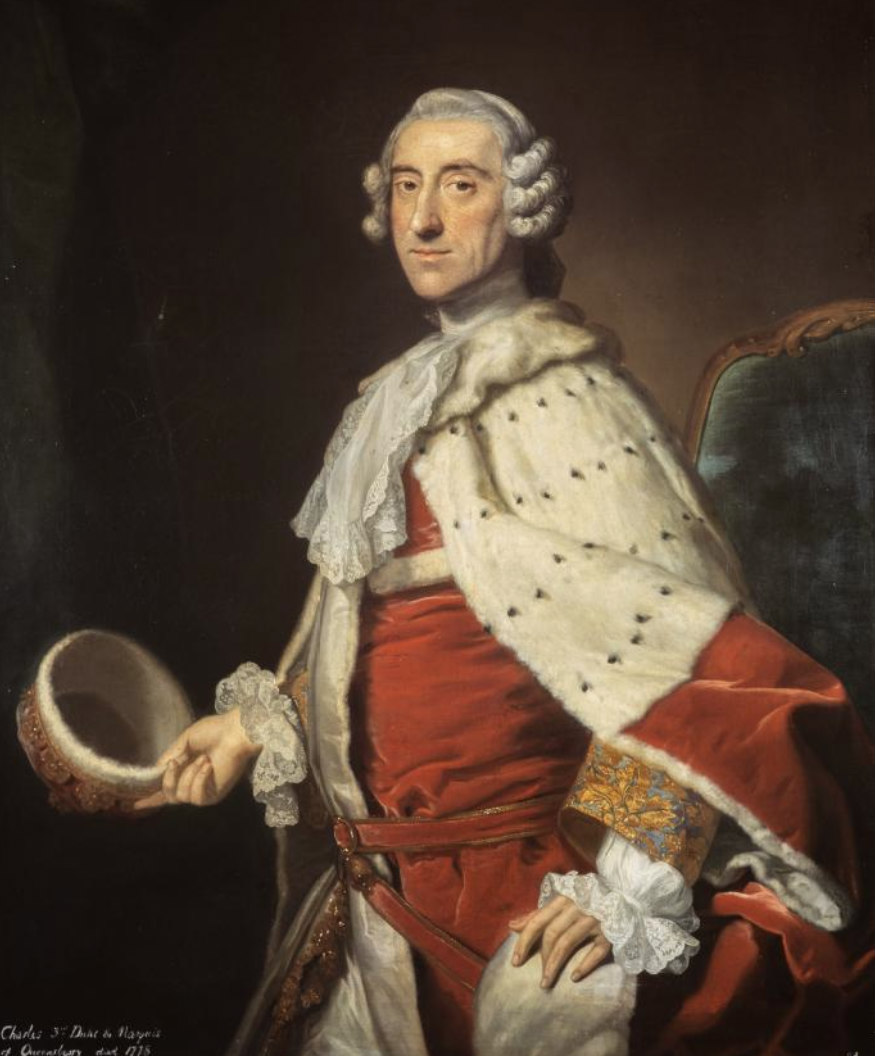
- Portrait by Thomas Hudson

Keeper of the Great Seal of Scotland
- In office 1761–1763
- Preceded by: The Duke of Argyll
- Succeeded by: The Duke of Atholl

Personal details
- Born: Charles Douglas; 24 November 1698 Queensberry House, Edinburgh, Scotland
- Died: 22 October 1778 (aged 79) Amesbury, Wiltshire, England
- Spouse: Lady Catherine Hyde (m. 1720; died 1777)
- Children: Henry Douglas, Earl of Drumlanrig
- Parent(s): James Douglas, 2nd Duke of Queensberry; Lady Mary Boyle

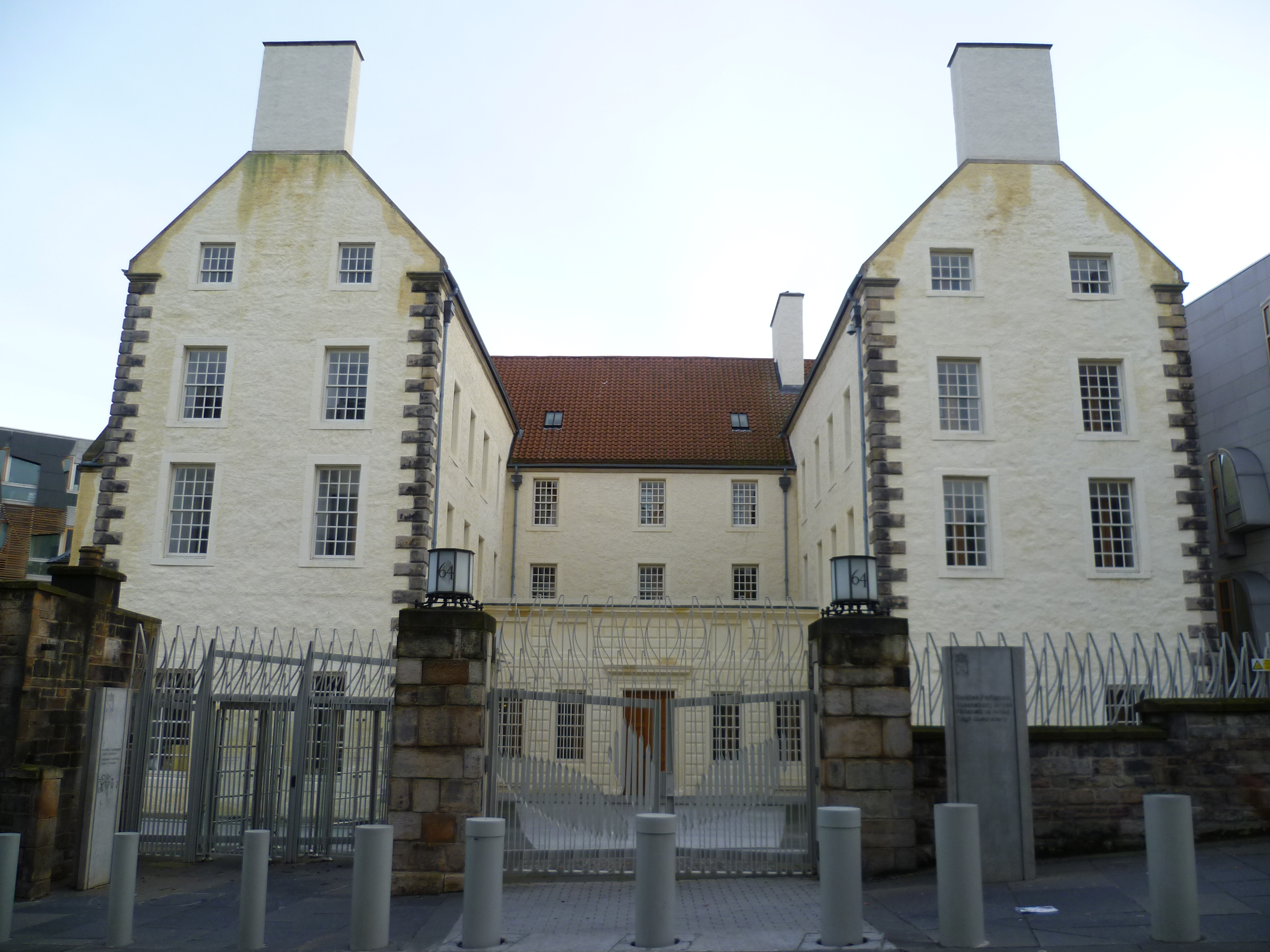
Queensberry House, Canongate, Edinburgh

Charles Douglas, 3rd Duke of Queensberry, 2nd Duke of Dover, PC (24 November 1698 – 22 October 1778) was a Scottish judge and landowner.

== Life ==
Charles was born in Queensberry House in Edinburgh on 24 November 1698, the younger son of James Douglas, 2nd Duke of Queensberry, 1st Duke of Dover, and his wife Mary Boyle, daughter of Charles Boyle, 3rd Viscount Dungarvan,

On 17 June 1706, while still a child, Charles was created in his own right Lord Douglas of Lockerbie, Dalveen and Thornhill, Viscount of Tiberris and Earl of Solway. In 1711, he succeeded his father as Duke of Queensberry, superseding his mentally ill older brother James Douglas. This happened because, in view of James being insane, the crown had granted a novodamus which excluded him from the succession to the Dukedom, but left James the Scottish Marquessate of the same name (Queensberry). In any case, the insane James died in 1715, at which point the Duke inherited the Marquessate as well, becoming 4th Marquess of Queensberry.

In 1728, Queensberry (as he was now known) took up the cause of John Gay, a friend of his wife, after Gay was refused a licence for his opera Polly. He quarreled with George II and resigned his appointments in the same year.

In 1746, the Duke of Queensberry invested in the British Linen Company as one of the original proprietors, hoping to aid the development of the Scottish economy through the manufacturing of linen to be sold to the American colonies and Caribbean plantations. In 1762, after the death of Archibald Campbell, 3rd Duke of Argyll, Queensberry became the Governor of the company until 1776. The period was one of turmoil and restructuring, as the directors of the company decided to stop manufacturing linen from factories owned in the Highlands and turn to financing independent manufacturers to continue their trade. It was an important moment in the history of Scottish finance and the future of the company.

He was a founding governor of London's Foundling Hospital, created in 1739. He was appointed Keeper of the Great Seal of Scotland in 1761 and was Lord Justice General from 1763 until his death in 1778. Queensberry was one of many who had lost heavily from the failure of the Douglas Heron and Co Bank in 1776. As his sons predeceased him, leaving him without heirs, his English titles, including the dukedom of Dover, became extinct, but the Queensberry title passed to his cousin, William Douglas.

== Family ==
On 10 March 1720 he married Lady Catherine Hyde, a daughter of Henry Hyde, 4th Earl of Clarendon. They had two sons, who both predeceased him:

- Henry Douglas, Earl of Drumlanrig (1722–1754)
- Charles Douglas, Earl of Drumlanrig (1726–1756)

Political offices
Preceded by Earl of Rothes	Vice Admiral of Scotland; 1722–1729	Succeeded by Earl of Stair
Preceded by Earl of Islay	Keeper of the Great Seal of Scotland; 1761–1763	Succeeded by Duke of Atholl
Legal offices
Preceded by Marquess of Tweeddale	Lord Justice General; 1763–1778	Succeeded by Earl of Mansfield
Honorary titles
Preceded by The Earl of Winchilsea and Nottingham	Senior Privy Counsellor; 1769–1778	Succeeded by The Earl of Sandwich
Peerage of Scotland
Preceded by James Douglas	Duke of Queensberry; 1711–1778	Succeeded by William Douglas
Preceded by James Douglas	Marquess of Queensberry; 1715–1778	Succeeded by William Douglas
New creation	Earl of Solway; 1706–1778	Extinct
Peerage of Great Britain
Preceded by James Douglas	Duke of Dover; 1711–1778	Extinct
