= Charter of novodamus =

Scottish feudal land grant change

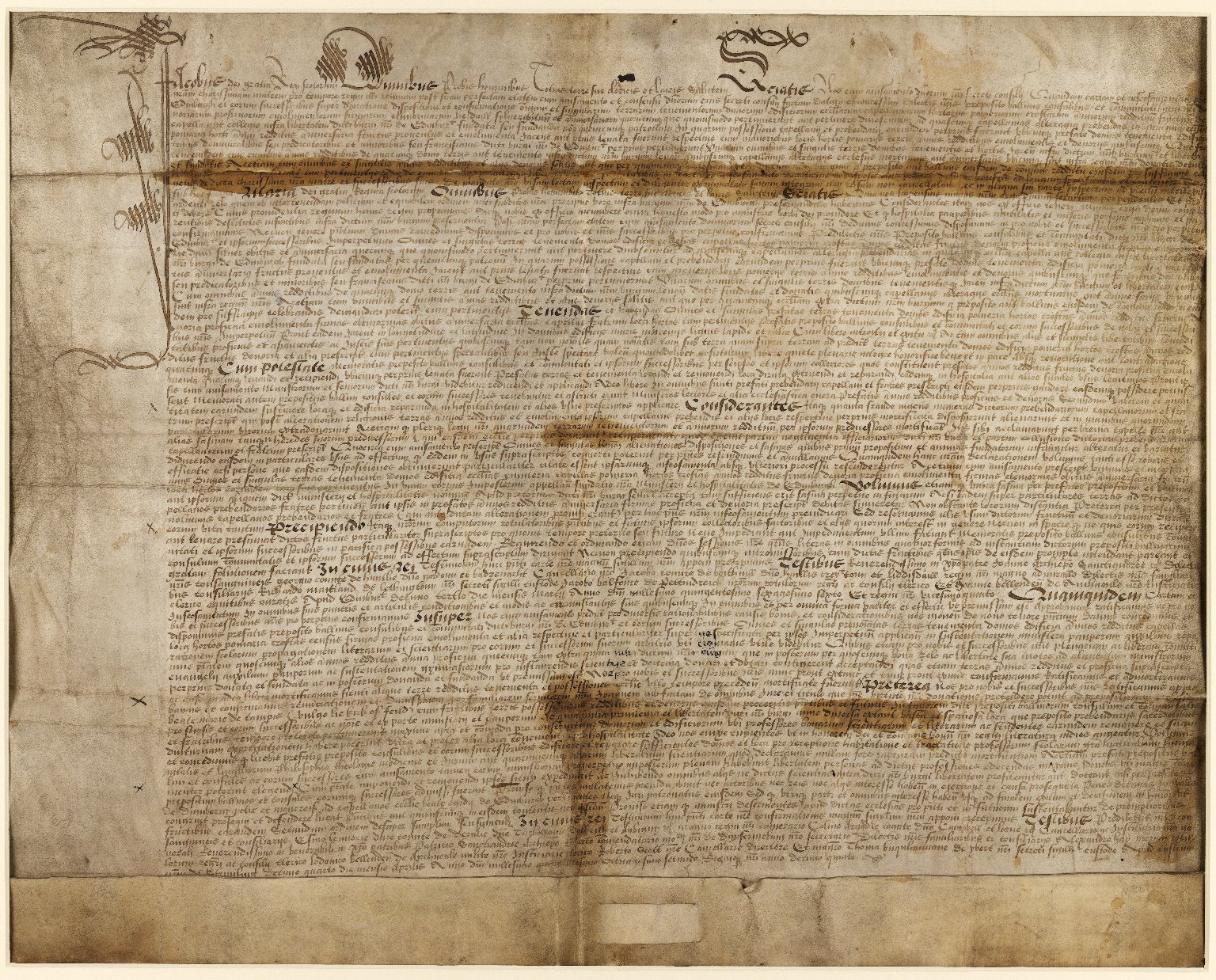
A 1582 charter of novodamus from King James VI which established the University of Edinburgh

A charter of novodamus, in Scottish feudal land law, is a fresh grant of lands to the grantee. It is usually granted to make some change in the incidents of tenure of land already granted, or to resolve doubts about the grant or its terms.

== See also ==
- Director of Chancery

== Sources ==
David Walker, ed. (1978). The Oxford Companion to Law. p. 894.
