= William Douglas of Kelhead =

Colonel Sir William Douglas of Kelhead (died 1673) raised a regiment of foot in Nithsdale and Annandale in 1643.

Arms of the House Douglas of Kelhead

== Early life ==
William Douglas was the son of William Douglas, 1st Earl of Queensberry (d. 1640) and Isobel Kerr of Lothian, daughter of Mark Kerr, 1st Earl of Lothian. His brother later became the 2nd Earl of Queensberry (d. 1671), and through a contract with him was left Kelhead.

== Career ==
Variously known as Colonel William Douglas of Kilhead’s (sic) Regiment of Foot and The Nithsdale and Annandale Regiment, it was a Covenanter Regiment of Foot raised for service in England, forming part of the Earl of Leven’s army.

At the Battle of Marston Moor, 2 July 1644, the second line was entirely composed of Scots, including William Douglas of Kilhead's Regiment, under Major-General Sir James Lumsden.

The regiment were previously deployed at the Siege of Newcastle in February 1644, and were again on 19 October 1644, when it was part of The "Third Brigade", sited opposite Pilgrim Street Gate, which they successfully assaulted that day, leading to the fall of the city.

From October 1644 to 25 June 1645, the regiment was part of the force that besieged Carlisle. Following the surrender, Colonel William Douglas was appointed Governor.

He was created Baronet of Nova Scotia in 1668.

== Personal life ==
He married Agnes Fawside, daughter of George Fawside of Fawside. Their son, Sir James Douglas of Kelhead (1639-1708) was made a Baronet in the Baronetage of Nova Scotia in his father's lifetime.
