= James Douglas, 2nd Duke of Queensberry =

Scottish statesman

His Grace The Duke of Queensberry and Dover KG PC
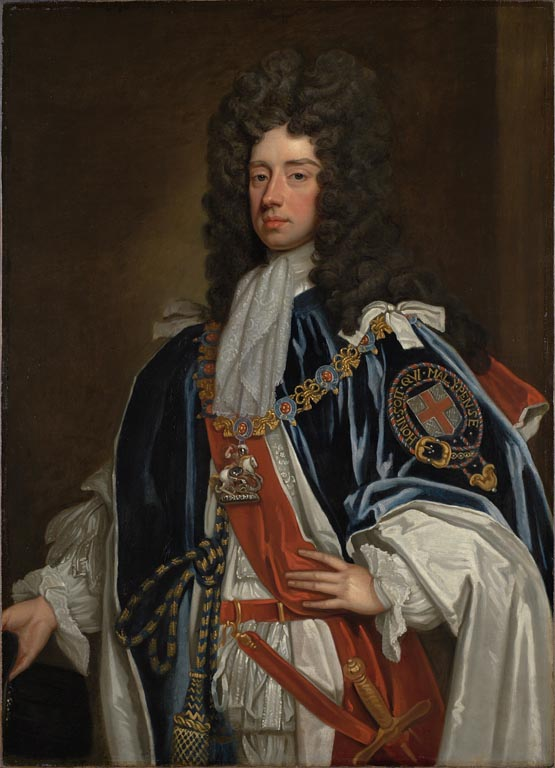
- Portrait by Sir Godfrey Kneller, c. 1701–1705

Secretary of State for Scotland
- In office 3 February 1709 – 6 July 1711
- Monarch: Anne
- Preceded by: The Earl of Mar
- Succeeded by: The Earl of Mar

Lord High Commissioner
- In office 31 July 1706 – 1 May 1707
- Monarch: Anne
- Preceded by: The Duke of Argyll
- In office 25 April 1700 – 31 May 1704
- Monarchs: William II; Anne
- Preceded by: The Earl of Marchmont
- Succeeded by: The Marquess of Tweeddale

Personal details
- Born: 18 December 1662 Sanquhar Castle, Dumfriesshire; Scotland
- Died: 6 July 1711 (aged 48) Mayfair, London, England
- Resting place: Durisdeer Parish Church, Durisdeer, Dumfries and Galloway
- Spouse: Hon. Mary Boyle (c. 1664–1709)
- Children: James Douglas, 3rd Marquess of Queensberry; Charles Douglas, 3rd Duke of Queensberry; Jane Scott, Countess of Dalkeith
- Parents: William Douglas, 1st Duke of Queensberry; Isabel Douglas

James Douglas, 2nd Duke of Queensberry and 1st Duke of Dover (18 December 1662 – 6 July 1711) was a Scottish statesman who was a leading politician in Scotland during the late 17th and the early 18th centuries. As Lord High Commissioner he was instrumental in negotiating and passing the Acts of Union 1707 with England, which created the Kingdom of Great Britain.

== Life ==
He was the eldest son of William Douglas, 1st Duke of Queensberry and his wife Isabel Douglas, daughter of William Douglas, 1st Marquess of Douglas. His title before succeeding his father was Lord Drumlanrig.

Educated at the University of Glasgow, he was appointed a Scottish Privy Counsellor in 1684, and was lieutenant-colonel of Dundee's regiment of horse. He supported William III in 1688 and was appointed colonel of the Scots Troop, Horse Guards Regiment. On his father's death in 1695 he succeeded to several titles, including 2nd Duke of Queensberry.

He was appointed Lord High Treasurer of Scotland from 1693 and Keeper of the Privy Seal of Scotland from 1695 to 1702. In 1696 he was appointed as Extraordinary Lord of Session. He was Lord High Commissioner to the Parliament of Scotland in 1700, 1702 and 1703, in which role he procured the abandonment of the Darien scheme. He was appointed a Knight of the Garter in 1701.

On the accession of Queen Anne in 1702, Douglas was appointed Secretary of State, soon jointly with George Mackenzie, 1st Earl of Cromartie. Douglas encouraged the Jacobites by his undecided attitude on the question of the royal succession, and was deluded into unconsciously furthering the Jacobite designs of Simon Fraser, 11th Lord Lovat. Lovat had used Queensberry's jealousy of the Duke of Atholl to obtain a commission from him to get evidence in France which would implicate Atholl. The plot was betrayed to Atholl by Robert Ferguson, and Douglas withdrew from government in 1704.

Reinstated as Keeper of the Privy Seal in 1705, he was among the Scottish commissioners who signed the 1706 Treaty of Union with England, ratified by the Acts of Union 1707. For this he was very unpopular in Scotland, but he received a pension of £3,000 a year.

In 1708 he was appointed to the British Privy Council and created Duke of Dover, Marquess of Beverley and Baron Ripon in the Peerage of Great Britain (titles extinct on the 1778 death of the second holder). He was Secretary of State for Scotland from 1709 until his death. His under-secretary during this period was the writer Nicholas Rowe. Queensberry died at his house in Albemarle Street, London, in 1711, of an "iliack passion" (intestinal obstruction). He was later reburied with his wife Marie at Durisdeer Parish Church in Nithsdale.

Queensberry House in Edinburgh is today part of the Scottish Parliament Building.

== Family ==
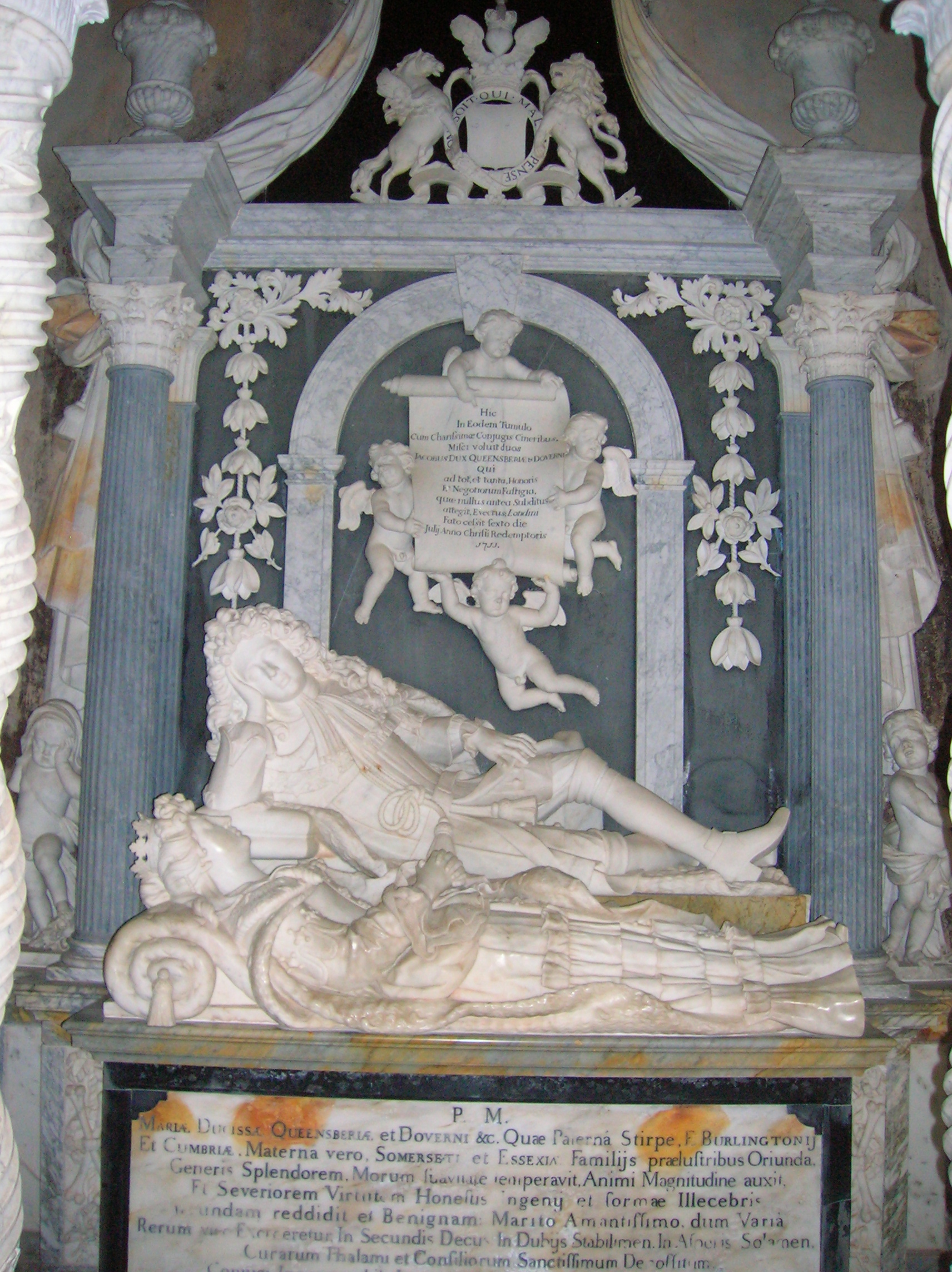
Tomb of James Douglas, 2nd Duke of Queensberry, and his wife, Mary, in Durisdeer Parish Church

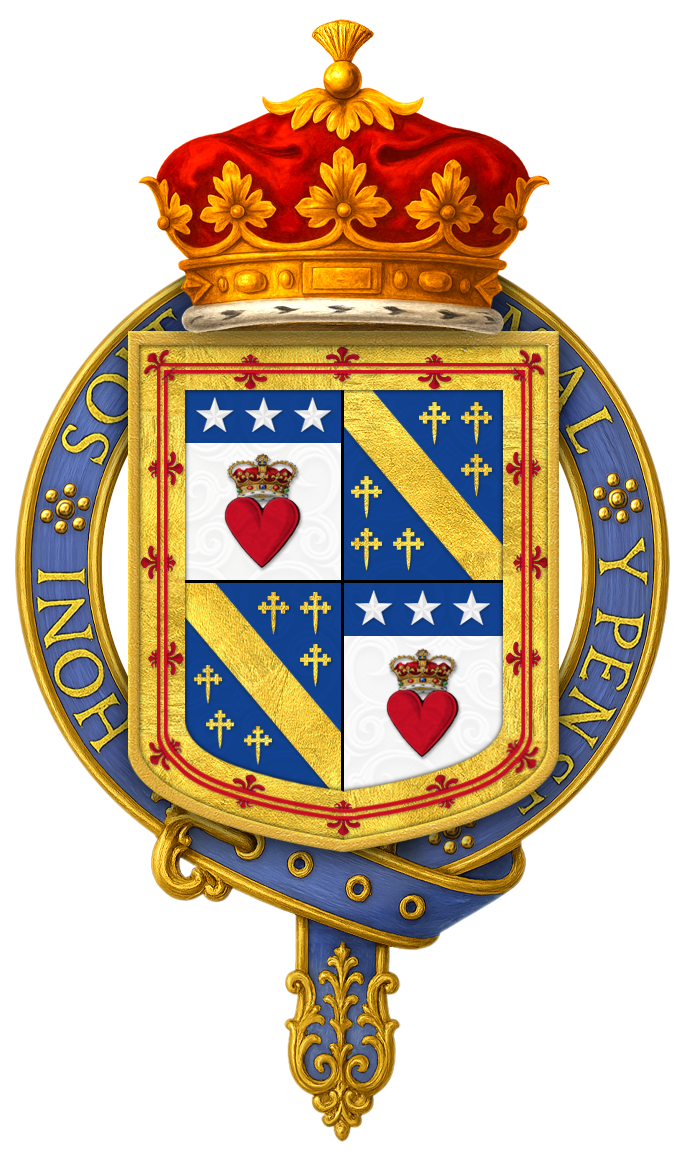
Arms of James Douglas, 2nd Duke of Queensberry, 1st Duke of Dover, KG

He married Mary Boyle, daughter of The Viscount Dungarvan and had at least 3 children:

- James (1697–1715). Insane; passed over from succeeding all his father's titles except the marquessate; he died unwed and childless
- Charles (1698–1778), succeeded his father as duke. He had two sons, but both died childless.
- Jane (1701–1729), married (as his first wife) The Earl of Dalkeith. Her descendants were the eventual inheritors of the family estates.

Military offices
Preceded by The Earl of Linlithgow	Captain and Colonel of the Scots Troop of Horse Guards; 1688–1696	Succeeded by The Earl of Argyll
Political offices
Unknown	Lord High Treasurer of Scotland; 1693 – Date unknown	Unknown
Preceded by The Earl of Melville	Keeper of the Privy Seal of Scotland; 1695–1702	Succeeded by The Duke of Atholl
Preceded by The Earl of Hyndford; The Earl of Seafield	Secretary of State; 1702–1704 with George Mackenzie	Succeeded by The Earl of Roxburghe; The Earl of Seafield
Preceded by The Duke of Atholl	Keeper of the Privy Seal of Scotland; 1705–1709	Succeeded by The Duke of Montrose
Preceded by The Earl of Mar	Secretary of State for Scotland; 1709–1711	Succeeded by The Earl of Mar
Parliament of Scotland
Preceded by The Earl of Tullibardine	Lord High Commissioner; 1700–1704	Succeeded by The Marquess of Tweeddale
Preceded by The Duke of Argyll	Lord High Commissioner; 1706–1707	Succeeded by Act of Union 1707
Peerage of Scotland
Preceded by William Douglas	Duke of Queensberry; 1695–1711	Succeeded by Charles Douglas
Preceded by William Douglas	Marquess of Queensberry; 1695–1711	Succeeded by James Douglas
Peerage of Great Britain
New creation	Duke of Dover; 1708–1711	Succeeded by Charles Douglas
