= James Douglas, 3rd Marquess of Queensberry =

Scottish noble

- Marquess of Queensberry
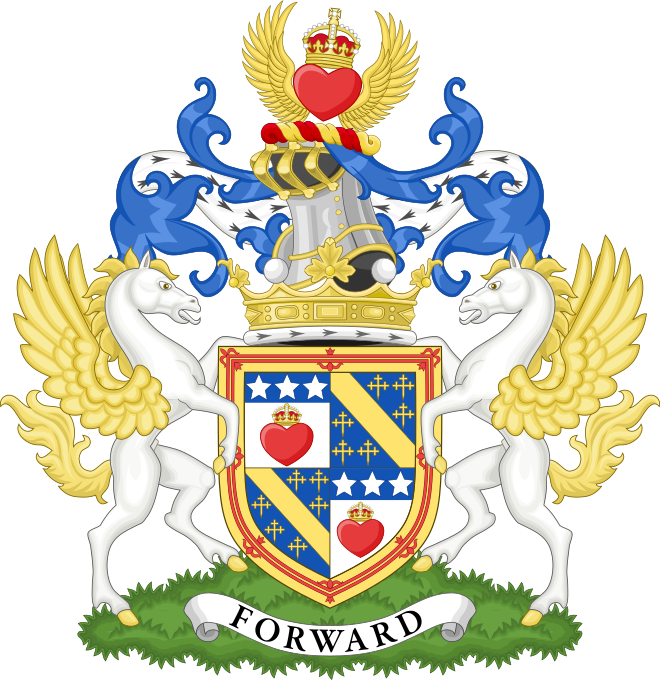
- Coat of arms
- Tenure: 1711–1715
- Predecessor: James Douglas, 2nd Marquess of Queensberry
- Successor: Charles Douglas, 4th Marquess of Queensberry
- Known for: Allegedly murdering and cannibalising a kitchen boy
- Born: 2 November 1697
- Died: 24 January 1715 (aged 17)
- Buried: 17 February 1715; Londesborough
- Father: James Douglas, 2nd Duke of Queensberry
- Mother: Mary Boyle

James Douglas, 3rd Marquess of Queensberry (2 November 1697 – 24 January 1715), known until 1711 as James Douglas, Earl of Drumlanrig, was a Scottish nobleman, the second son, and eldest to survive infancy, of James Douglas, 2nd Duke of Queensberry.

== Life ==
Stories describe him as an "imbecile" and violently insane. He was kept under lock and key from childhood at Queensberry House in Edinburgh, now part of the Scottish Parliament complex.

It is reported that when the Act of Union was signed in 1707, the disruption from either the festivities or the riots resulted in his escape. Drumlanrig, then around 10 years old, slaughtered a servant in the house's kitchen, roasted him on a spit, and began to eat him before he was discovered and apprehended. There have been suggestions that the story was fabricated by opponents of the Act of Union as evidence of divine punishment. He was afterwards known as 'The Cannibalistic Idiot'. The oven he used is located in a room in the basement of Queensberry House, which housed the Parliament's Allowances Office until 2012, when it became a private bar for MSPs and their guests.

A charter of novodamus (i.e., de novo damus, "we grant anew"; a charter containing a clause by which a feudal superior re-bestows a former grant under a new set of conditions) had been made out in 1706 for his father's titles, excepting the marquessate of Queensberry, to remove James Douglas from the succession.

== Death ==
He died on 24 January 1715 and was buried on 17 February. The parish register for Calverley, near Leeds, West Yorkshire, includes the burial record of "James Dowgles, Marquess of Drumlangrick" under the heading "burials at Calverley and Pudsey" but states that he died at "Woodall" and was buried in "Launsborow", which the 1887 transcriber interprets as "Woodhall" and Londesborough respectively, stating that he "appears to have died at Woodhall under the care of Mr. Richardson".

His brother Charles Douglas, 3rd Duke of Queensberry, succeeded him to the marquessate.

Peerage of Scotland
Preceded by James Douglas	Marquess of Queensberry; 1711–1715	Succeeded by Charles Douglas
