= Walter Scott, 1st Earl of Buccleuch =

Scottish nobleman

Arms of Scott of Buccleuch: Or, on a bend azure a mullet of six points between two crescents of the first

Walter Scott, 1st Earl of Buccleuch, 2nd Baron Scott of Buccleuch (before 1606 – 20 November 1633) was a Scottish nobleman.

He was the son of Walter Scott, 1st Lord Scott of Buccleuch (c. 1549–1611), and Mary Kerr, a daughter of Mark Kerr, 1st Earl of Lothian.

Scott had several siblings, including his brother Francis Scott, who succeeded him as the 2nd Earl of Buccleuch. The family played a prominent role in the Border regions of Scotland, and Walter Scott, through his inherited titles and connections, continued the tradition of political and military involvement.

His marriage to Lady Mary Hay, daughter of Francis Hay, 9th Earl of Erroll, added to the family's prestigious alliances. The Scott family's influence endured through generations, contributing significantly to the historical tapestry of Scottish nobility.

He succeeded his father as Lord Scott of Buccleuch on 15 December 1611. He was created Earl of Buccleuch, with the subsidiary title Baron Scott of Whitchester and Eskdaill, on 16 May 1619.

In 1624 several members of the Eliot family conspired to murder the earl, but their attempt came to nothing.

He was commander of a detachment of Scotsmen in the service of Holland in 1629 against the Spaniards, when he served at the Siege of 's-Hertogenbosch. He died on 20 November 1633 in London, but was not buried at Hawick until 11 June 1634 as the ship carrying his body was driven by a storm towards the coast of Norway.

He had married Lady Mary Hay, daughter of Francis Hay, 9th Earl of Erroll and Elizabeth Douglas, around 15 October 1616, with a tocher of 20,000 merks. He had a son and heir, Francis, and two daughters.

== Family ==
Walter Scott and Mary Hay contracted on 11 October 1616 and were married on 15 October 1616. Some of their notable children include:

1. Francis Scott, 2nd Earl of Buccleuch (1626–1651): Born in 1626, Francis succeeded his father as the 2nd Earl of Buccleuch. He died in 1651.
2. Walter Scott (1627–1633): Born in 1627, Walter died at a young age in 1633.
3. Anne Scott, Countess of Buccleuch (1628–1700): Born in 1628. She died in 1700.
4. Margaret Scott (1630–1678): Born in 1630. She died in 1678.
5. Mary Scott (1632–1668): Born in 1632. She died in 1668.

Peerage of Scotland
New creation	Earl of Buccleuch; 1619–1633	Succeeded by Francis Scott
Preceded by Walter Scott	Lord Scott of Buccleuch; 1611–1633	Succeeded by Francis Scott
