= William Douglas, 1st Earl of Queensberry =

Scottish noble

William Douglas, 1st Earl of Queensberry (c. 1582 – 8 March 1639/40) was a Scottish noble.

He was the eldest son of James Douglas, 8th of Drumlanrig and his wife Mary Fleming. He inherited his father's title, as 9th Laird of Drumlanrig, in October 1615. Between 1616 and 1623, he held the offices of Provost of Lincluden, Sheriff of Dumfries, and Justice of the peace for Dumfries. On 1 April 1628 he was created lord Douglas, of Hawick and Tibbers, viscount Drumlanrig.

He was created the first earl of Queensberry in 1633, originating the still-extant Queensberry titles. On his death he was succeeded in his titles by his son James.

== Family ==
He married Isabel Kerr, daughter of Mark, Earl of Lothian in 1603. They had issue:

- James (before 1622 – 1671), who became second earl
- William (died 1673), ancestor of subsequent marquesses of Queensberry
- Archibald (born after 1604)
- Robert
- Margaret (died 1640), married James Johnstone, 1st Earl of Hartfell in 1622
- Janet, married Thomas Maclellan, 2nd Lord Kirkcudbright 28 July 1640

Peerage of Scotland
New creation	Earl of Queensberry; 1633–1640	Succeeded by James Douglas
New creation	Viscount of Drumlanrig; 1628–1671	Succeeded by James Douglas
