= Henry Douglas, Earl of Drumlanrig =

The Earl of Drumlanrig
- Portrait of Drumlanrig attributed to Francis Lindo
- Born: 30 October 1722
- Died: 19 October 1754 (aged 31)
- Spouse: Lady Elizabeth Hope
- Parents: Charles Douglas, 3rd Duke of Queensberry (father); Catherine Douglas, Duchess of Queensberry (mother)
- Military career
- Allegiance: Scotland; Dutch Republic
- Service years: 1747–1753
- Unit: Scots Brigade
- Conflicts: War of the Austrian Succession; Siege of Coni

Henry Douglas, Earl of Drumlanrig (30 October 1722 – 19 October 1754) was a Scottish army officer.

== Biography ==
Henry Douglas was born in 1722, the eldest son of Charles Douglas, 3rd Duke of Queensberry, 2nd Duke of Dover, and his wife Catherine.

He was educated at Winchester College and at Christ Church, University of Oxford and then chose a military life. He served in two campaigns under the Earl of Stair and three campaigns under the King of Sardinia, where, at the Siege of Coni, he so distinguished himself that Charles Emmanuel, King of Sardinia, ordered his ambassador in London to wait on the Duke of Queensberry to thank him for the services performed by his son.

He commanded a regiment of two battalions in the Scots Brigade in the Netherlands between 1747 and 1753. He married on 24 July 1754 Lady Elizabeth Hope, daughter of John Hope, 2nd Earl of Hopetoun, but accidentally shot himself dead near Bawtry, in Yorkshire on 19 October 1754. His widow died only 18 months later. Henry's brother, Charles, succeeded him, but died in 1756, leaving their father without heirs. The Queensberry titles passed in 1778 to a distant cousin, William Douglas, Earl of March and Ruglan.
