= James Douglas, 2nd Earl of Queensberry =

17th-century Scottish noble and politician

James Douglas, 2nd Earl of Queensberry (before 1622 – 1671) was a Scottish noble, politician and Covenanter.

== Biography ==
James was the second son of William Douglas, 1st Earl of Queensberry and his wife Isabel. On his father's death in 1640 he succeeded to the titles 2nd Earl of Queensberry, 2nd Viscount of Drumlanrig, and 2nd Lord Douglas of Hawick and Tibberis.

James was appointed a Commissioner for the apprehension of papists on 5 July 1642. He supported Charles I in the Civil War and was taken prisoner after the Battle of Kilsyth, being confined in Carlisle in 1645. Subsequently, he was fined 180,000 Scots merks (of which only 120,000 was paid), and again fined £4,000 under Cromwell's Act of Grace, which constituted a conditional pardon. In 1661 he was appointed a Commissioner of Excise, and a justice of the peace in 1663.

== Family ==
James married first Mary Hamilton (Viscountess Drumlanrig), 3rd daughter of James Hamilton, 2nd Marquess of Hamilton, by contract dated 4 June 1630. She died on 29 October 1633. The marriage had no issue.

He married secondly Margaret Stewart, daughter of John Stewart, 1st Earl of Traquair, by contract dated 26 March 1635. Issue:

- William (1637–1695), 3rd earl and 1st Duke of Queensbury
- James (1645–1691), Lieutenant-General
- John (died 8 August 1675), died in Siege of Trier
- Robert (died 1676), died in Siege of Maastricht
- Mary, married Alexander Stewart, 3rd Earl of Galloway
- Isabel, married William Lockhart, 1st Baronet of Lockhart
- Catherine, married Sir James Douglas, 1st Baronet of Kelhead
- Margaret, married Sir Alexander Jardine, 1st Baronet of Applegirth
- Henrietta (1657 – 15 April 1736), married Sir Robert Grierson, 1st Baronet of Lag

Peerage of Scotland
Preceded by William Douglas	Earl of Queensberry; 1640–1671	Succeeded by William Douglas
