= Francis Douglas, Viscount Drumlanrig =

British baron

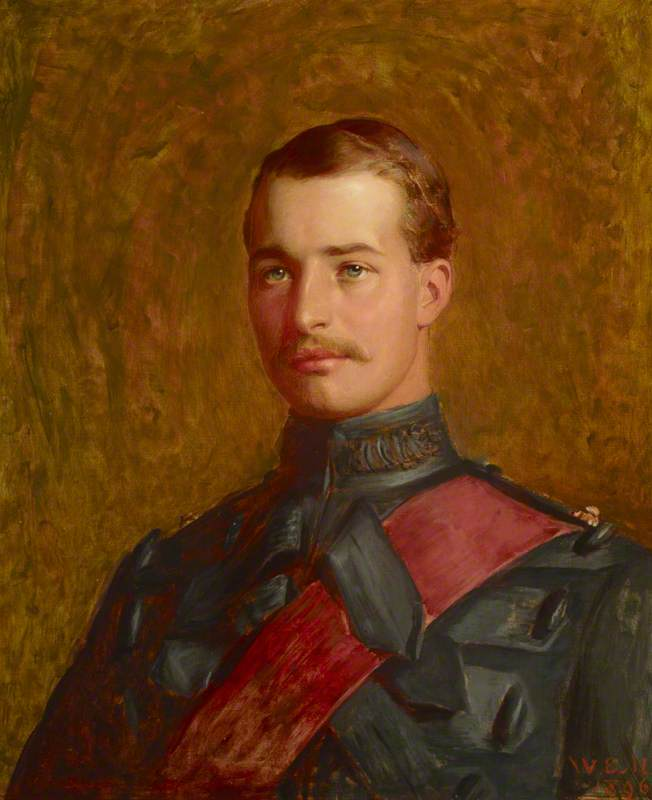
Posthumous portrait of Drumlanrig, by William Edwards Miller, 1896

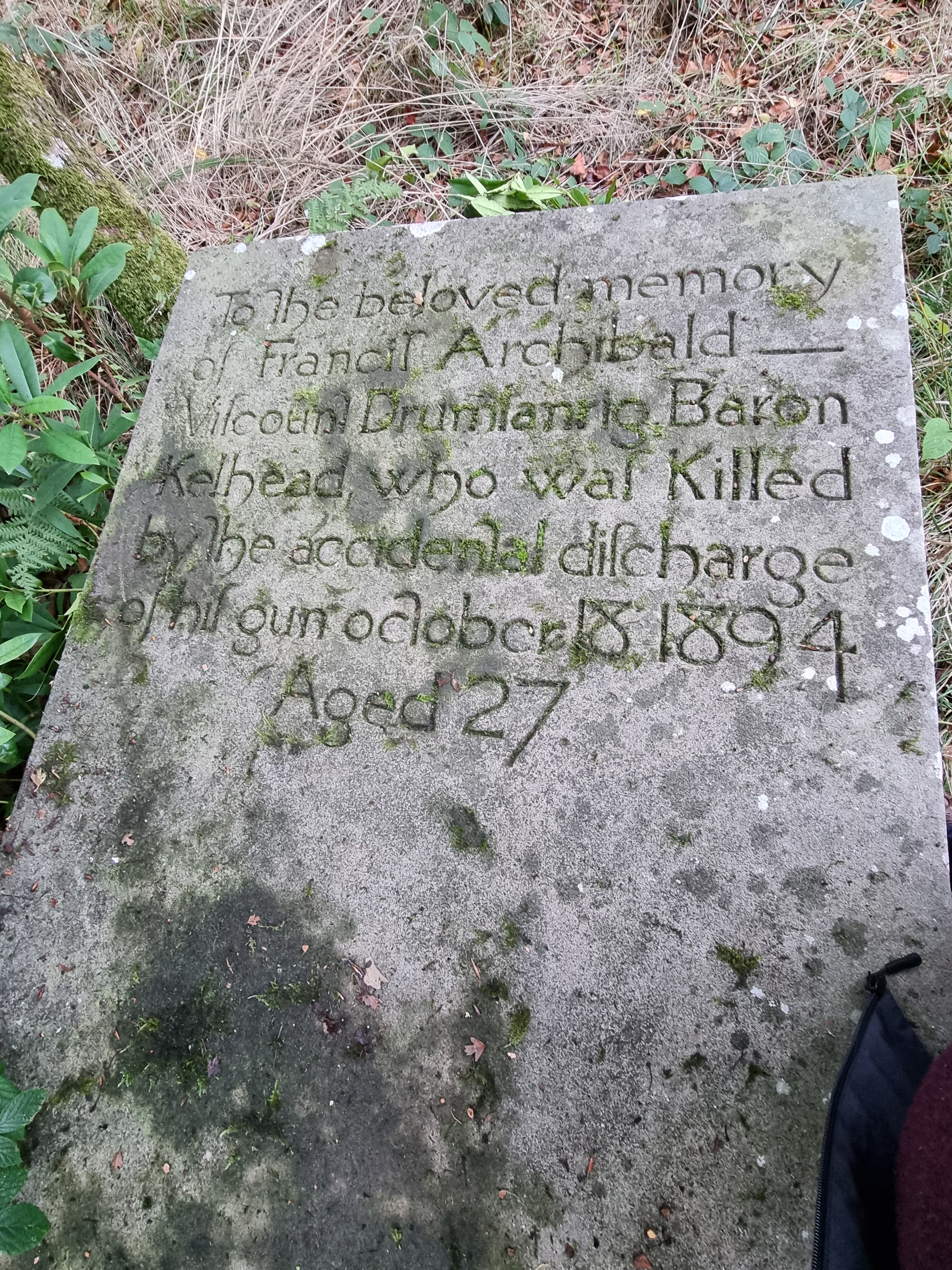
Grave of Francis Douglas at Gooley Hill, near Kinmount House

Francis Archibald Douglas, Viscount Drumlanrig (3 February 1867 – 18 October 1894), also 1st Baron Kelhead in his own right, was a British nobleman and Liberal politician.

== Early life ==
Born at 8 Chesterfield Street, Mayfair, London, Drumlanrig was the eldest son of John Douglas, 9th Marquess of Queensberry, by his first wife Sibyl, daughter of Alfred Montgomery. As the heir apparent of the Marquess, he used the courtesy title Viscount Drumlanrig. He was educated at Harrow and at the Royal Military College, Sandhurst and served as lieutenant in the 2nd Battalion of the Coldstream Guards, British Army, from June 1887, when he received his commission, to 1893.

== Political career ==
Lord Drumlanrig later served as private secretary to the Liberal politician Lord Rosebery. Owing to Rosebery's patronage, on 22 June 1893 he was created Baron Kelhead, of Kelhead in the County of Dumfries, in the Peerage of the United Kingdom. This gave him his own seat in the House of Lords, unlike his father, whose titles were all in the Peerage of Scotland. In July 1893 he was appointed a Lord-in-waiting by Rosebery.

Lord Queensberry had served in Parliament from 1872 to 1880 as a Scottish representative peer, but in 1880 he refused, as an atheist, to take the religious oath of allegiance to the Queen. He was not allowed to take his seat and was never again chosen as a representative peer by the Scottish nobles. Drumlanrig's accession to Parliament as the 1st Baron Kelhead precipitated a bitter dispute between him and Queensberry, and also between Queensberry and Rosebery, who became Prime Minister in 1894.

== Personal life ==
On 18 October 1894, sixteen months after his ennoblement, Drumlanrig died at Quantock Lodge, Somerset, at age 27, from injuries received during a shooting party. The inquest returned a verdict of "accidental death", but his death was also rumoured to be suicide or murder. He was buried in the family burial ground at Kinmount, Dumfriesshire, where his gravestone states he "was killed by the accidental discharge of his gun". He was unmarried and his younger brother Lord Percy Douglas became heir to his father's titles. It was speculated at the time, and evidence suggests, that Drumlanrig may have had a homosexual relationship with Rosebery. It has been further suggested that Queensberry had threatened to expose the Prime Minister's supposed proclivities if his government did not vigorously prosecute Oscar Wilde for Wilde's relationship with Drumlanrig's younger brother, Lord Alfred Douglas. Rosebery was, by most accounts, happily married until the death of his wife in 1890, though gossip that Rosebery was homosexual or bisexual was widespread. Queensberry believed, as he put it in a letter, that "Snob Queers like Rosebery" had corrupted his sons, and he held Rosebery indirectly responsible for Drumlanrig's death.

Peerage of the United Kingdom
New creation	Baron Kelhead; 1893–1894	Extinct
