= Helen Douglas Irvine =

Scottish novelist

Helen Douglas-Irvine

Helen Douglas Irvine (born Helen Florence Douglas-Irvine; 29 February 1880 – 22 May 1946) was a Scottish novelist, historian and translator and was one of the Douglases of Grangemuir.

== Early life and education ==
Helen Florence Douglas-Irvine was born in 1880, the daughter of Walter Douglas-Irvine and Anne Frances (née Lloyd), granddaughter of Lord William Robert Keith Douglas (the younger brother of both Charles Douglas, 6th Marquess of Queensberry and John Douglas, 7th Marquess of Queensberry).

She was one of the first female graduates of St Andrews University having read History, near her family home Grangemuir, near Pittenweem in Fife.

== Career ==
Douglas-Irvine wrote seven novels, four books of history, and at least two book-length translations. She was also a contributing author to the Victoria County History book series, and contributed poetry to the collection A Scallopshell of Quiet (1917). She was a clerk with the French Red Cross during World War I.

== Death ==
Douglas Irvine died on 22 May 1946 from pneumonia in Chile, while researching a book on early Spanish colonial life. She was 66 years old. Her grave is in Dunino, Fife.

== Works ==
=== Novels ===
- Magdalena (1936)
- Fray Mario (1939)
- Mirror of a Dead Lady (1940)
- Angelic Romance (1941)
- Sweet is the Rose (1944)
- 77 Willow Road (1945)
- Torchlight Procession (1946)

=== Historical writing ===
- Royal Palaces of Scotland (1911)
- Extracts Relating to Mediaeval Markets and Fairs in England (1912)
- History of London (1912)
- The Making of Rural Europe (1923)

=== Translations ===
- (with W.D. MacInnes), Emile Legouis and Louis Cazamian, A History of English Literature (1926)
- (with Charlotte Balfour), Saint Catherine of Genoa, Treatise on Purgatory (1946)
