= Douglases of Grangemuir =

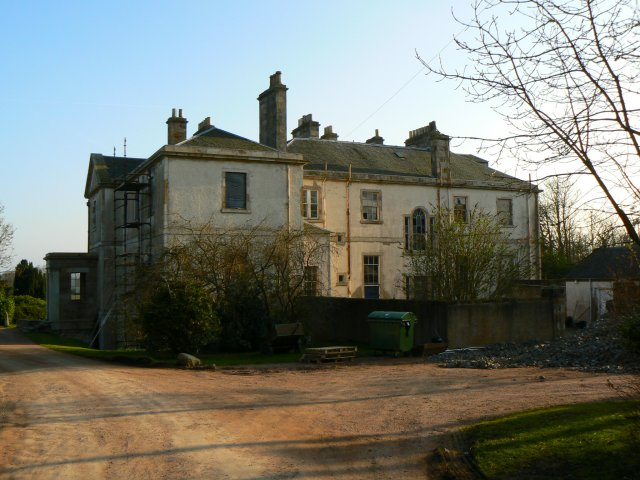
Grangemuir House

Grangemuir House was the seat of a junior branch of the Douglas family in Scotland. The house and attached estate was bought by Walter Irvine, a Scot who owned sugar estates in Tobago and Luddington House in Surrey.

It then passed to Irvine's daughter, Elizabeth, and her husband, Lord William Robert Keith Douglas, the fourth son of Sir William Douglas, 4th Baronet of Kelhead, and younger brother of both Charles Douglas, 6th Marquess of Queensberry and John Douglas, 7th Marquess of Queensberry. Grangemuir House is located just north of Pittenweem in Fife, Scotland and is now sitting within Grangemuir Woodland Chalet Park.

The house was of French design and was constructed as a hunting lodge for the family in the 18th century. The building was clad in the 1970s with pebbledashed concrete as a cheap way of excluding damp. Members of this branch of the Douglas family usually matriculated their arms with the mottos Jamais Arrière or Forward. However, in 1979, the previous head of the family, Walter Francis Edward Douglas (1917–2013), who converted to Roman Catholicism, was granted permission by the Lord Lyon to matriculate his arms with the motto Tendir and Trewe, as taken from the 15th-century poem The Buke of the Howlat, by Sir Richard Holland, chaplain to Archibald Douglas, Earl of Moray:

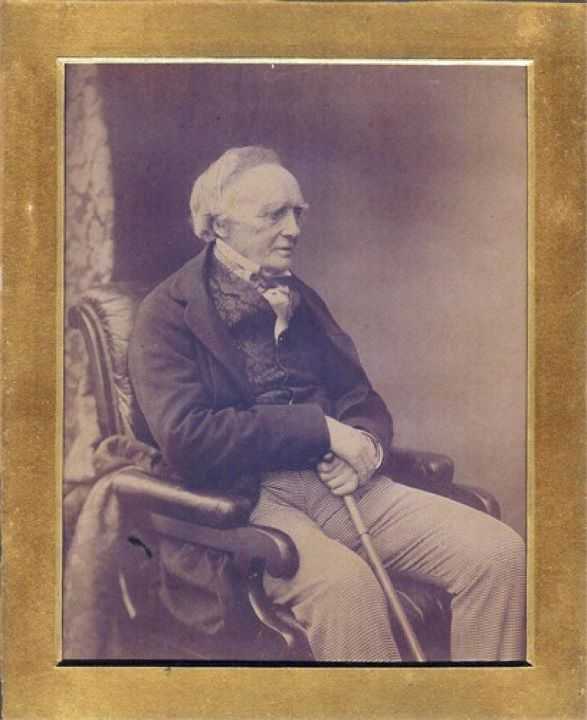
Lord William Robert Keith Douglas

O Douglas, O Douglas!
Tendir and trewe

== History ==
Grangemuir House was given to Lord William Robert Keith Douglas (1783 – 1859) along with 2,700 acres (11 km^{2}) of land surrounding it. On 24 November 1824, he married Elizabeth Irvine (died 1864); the couple had three children, William (1824–1868), Walter (1825–1901), and Charles (1837–1918). The children founded the Douglas Cottage Hospital in St Andrews in 1866 as a memorial to their mother, Lady William Douglas of Grangemuir - this memorial is still reflected in the contemporary St Andrews Memorial Hospital, one of whose wards is still called the Douglas Ward.

The heir, Walter Douglas Irvine married Anne Frances Lloyd, the daughter of an Anglo-Irish doctor from County Roscommon in 1870. They had six children, a number of whom were profoundly deaf. Some of these were known by the surname "Irvine", others "Douglas", rather than "Douglas-Irvine":

1. William Keith Douglas-Irvine (1876–1957)
2. Capt. (Walter) Francis Douglas (1878–1950)
3. Helen Florence Douglas (1880–1947), notable translator, historian & fiction writer and one of the first female graduates of St Andrews University
4. Rev. Henry Archibald Douglas-Irvine (1883–1962), Parson
5. Charles Gordon Douglas-Irvine (1885–1946)
6. Capt. Edward Percy Douglas (1886–?)
7. Lucy Christina Douglas-Irvine (1874?–19??), artist
8. Elizabeth Douglas-Irvine (?–?)

The 1905 Valuation Rolls show that after Walter died in 1901, almost all of the 64 listed properties were put under tenancy, including Grangemuir House, Farm and surrounding buildings which was rented by a Col. Erskine from May 1902 onwards (he eventually purchased the property in 1920). In 1912, 1913, 1914, 1915 and 1916 a Mrs Douglas Irvine rented five different properties in the nearby village of Pittenweem, changing house each year. This is presumed to be Anne, who died in 1917.

The heir, Rev. Henry Archibald Douglas-Irvine, a parson, married Beatrice Alice Mabel Gratix (died 1976) in 1913, producing a son and heir, Walter Francis Edward Douglas who was born in 1917.

In May 1920, fifteen lots of the Grangemuir and Dunino farms were put up for sale. Just four were sold due to auction bids exceeding their "upset" price. A further seven lots were sold by 1924 at values below their original valuation.

The house continued in use until the 1970s whereupon it fell into ruin and was subsequently converted to a caravan park. Reportedly it has recently been demolished as it had become unsafe.

Henry's son, Walter Francis Edward Douglas (1917 – 2013), moved to Lincolnshire to become an art teacher at Stamford School. He married Eugénie Nelly Chaudoir, a great-niece of the Belgian composer Félix Chaudoir and granddaughter of Guillaume Gustave Chaudoir, musical director of the Moore & Burgess Minstrels at St James's Hall, London. The oldest surviving member of the family is the eldest child of Walter Francis Edward Douglas, Francis Gustave Douglas (born 1946), Professor Emeritus of University College Cork who has lived in County Cork, Ireland since 1980. His own heir apparent is his son Niall Edward Douglas (born 1978).

The family branch which built Dunino church and primary school still have exclusive right of burial in one half of the church graveyard, located just south of St Andrews and just north of Grangemuir. The family resumed its connection with the area in the 1990s and 2000s when two members attended the nearby St Andrews University. Records relating to the Grangemuir estates, along with a small number of other family papers, can be found in the Special Collections Archive of St Andrews University Library. They were rescued from an Edinburgh law firm in 1994 and subsequently donated to the University.

== Economics ==
According to an article in the Dundee Courier, in 1818 Grangemuir (house and estate) was valued at around £40,000, which is equivalent to about £38 million today. The land boundary of this reference is unknown, but would be assumed to be the widest possible extent.

According to the Valuation Rolls, in 1855 Lord William Douglas owned 28 properties. A few years before he died in 1859, he built Dunino church and rebuilt the school into a much larger new building suitable for 90 children.

In 1872 when Walter Douglas assumed title, 44 properties were listed, with further properties inherited but left untitled (it cost money to register title, and inherited land was yours anyway). In addition to purchasing Eastern Grangemuir in 1873, he built many more properties on his land and in the 1895 roll, some 64 properties were listed not including properties inherited but untitled, most of which were earning rents from tenants. Grangemuir reported annual revenues to the Treasury of £5298 in 1880, which was equivalent to about £3,917,000 in 2016.

Financial problems appear to have begun to beset the family from around the Long Depression (1870s) onwards. Land area owned did not increase after 1873. Probate for Walter Douglas who died in 1901 valued his effects at £3,709 and real estate at £56,860, which is equivalent to about £2,224,000 and £34 million in 2016. However, he had a loan secured against the property for £32,013, so his total estate (in modern terms, in those days only rents from real estate counted towards probate) was £28,556, which is equivalent to £17 million in 2016.

The May 1920 auction mentioned earlier had upset prices for the fifteen lots total to £53,900 (around £11.9m today), but as mentioned earlier most of the lots could not sell at their reserve price, so this is surely an overestimate of their value at that time. Other land owners nearby experienced significant loss of value according to the Land and Property registry, with probates showing up to a two thirds loss of value between 1924 and 1945.

Reportedly, the eldest son and heir of Walter Douglas, William Keith Douglas-Irvine, required to have a trust set up to take care of him until the end of his life in 1957, and when his next eldest brother Henry Douglas took possession of that trust, only £20,000 remained (equivalent to about £1,303,000 in 2016).

== Family photographs ==
The Douglas of Grangemuir family
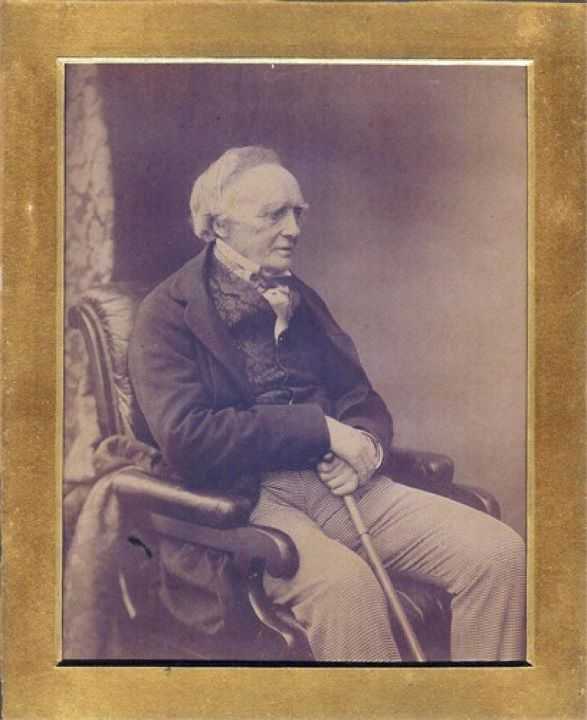
Lord William Robert Keith Douglas

Walter Douglas-Irvine of Grangemuir and Dunino

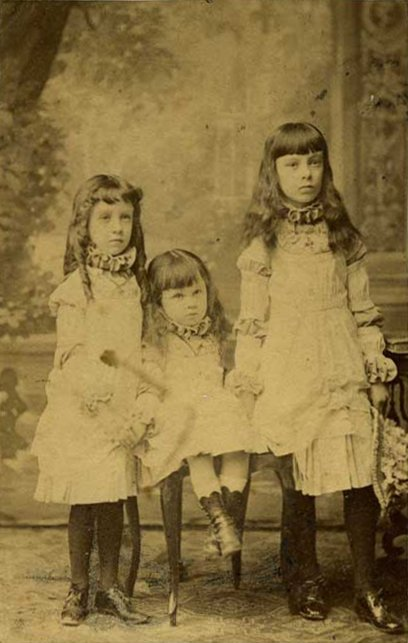
Lucy, Elizabeth & Helen, the daughters of Walter Douglas-Irvine

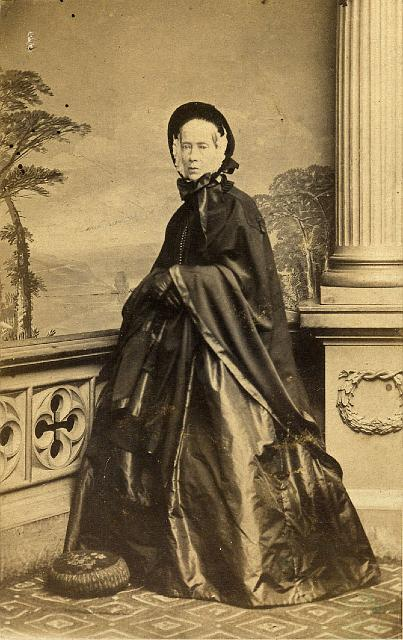
Lady William Douglas

Francis, Henry & Edward, sons of Walter Douglas-Irvine

The Rev. Henry Archibald Douglas-Irvine, son of Walter Douglas-Irvine

Walter Francis Edward Douglas-Irvine, son of Rev. Henry Archibald Douglas-Irvine

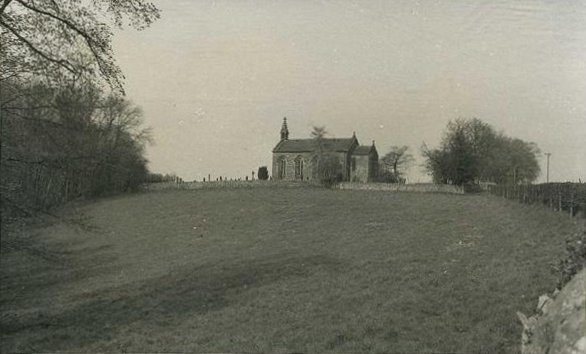
Dunino Church, the site of the Douglas family graveyard
