= Higham Ferrers Town Hall =

Municipal building in Higham Ferrers, Northamptonshire, England

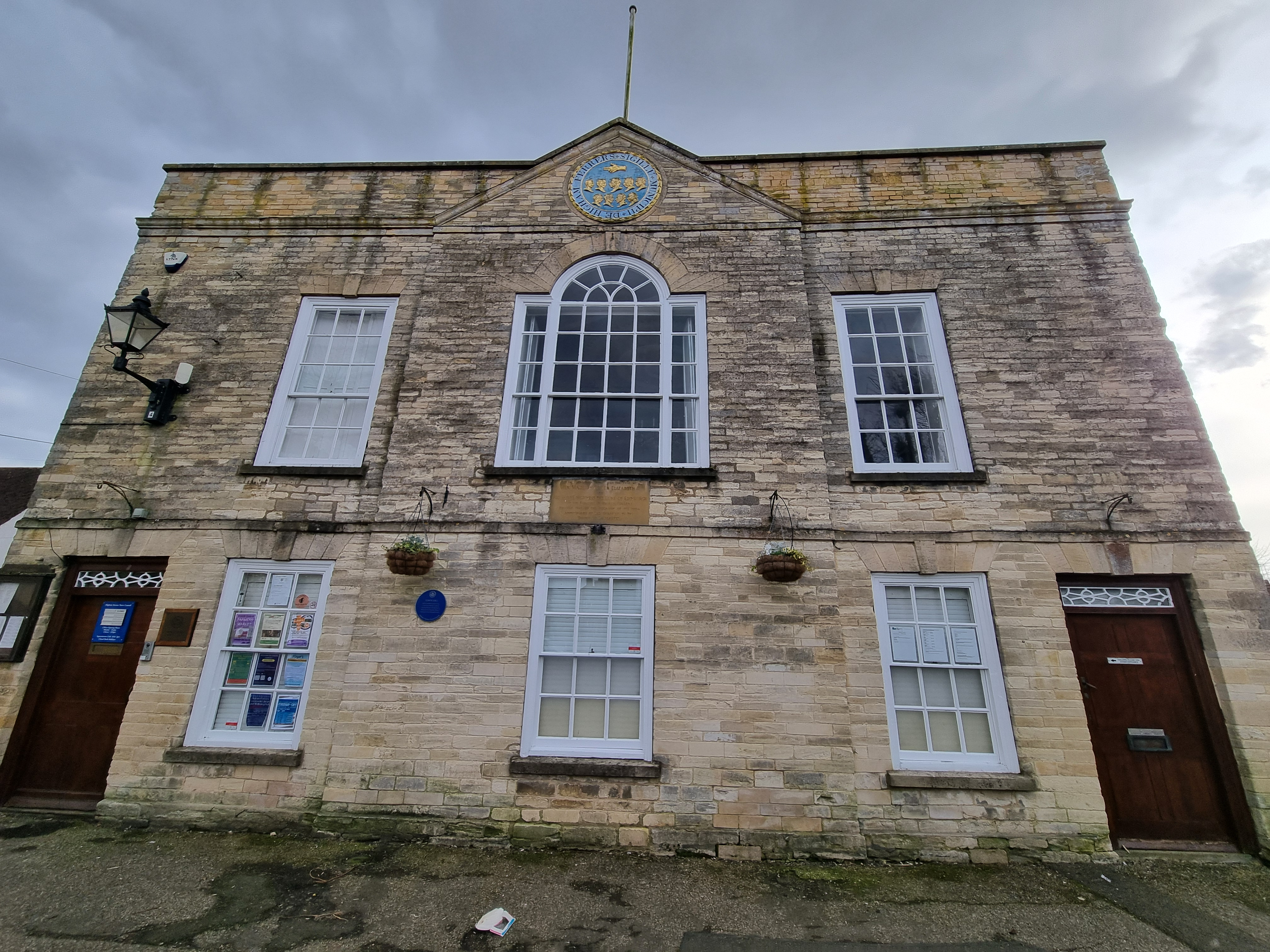
- Higham Ferrers Town Hall

- Shown in Northamptonshire
- 52.3058°N 0.5929°W
- Location: Market Square, Higham Ferrers

History
- Built: 1809

Site notes
- Architectural style: Neoclassical style

Listed Building – Grade II
- Official name: Town Hall
- Designated: 23 September 1950
- Reference no.: 1371873

Higham Ferrers Town Hall is a municipal building in the Market Square in Higham Ferrers, Northamptonshire, England. The structure, which serves as the offices and meeting place of Higham Ferrers Town Council, is a Grade II listed building.

== History ==
The first town hall was a medieval structure in the Market Square, which incorporated a lock-up for incarcerating petty criminals and an external staircase on the east side providing access to an assembly room on the first floor. The assembly room displayed two sets of mid-17th century coats of armour, which were relocated to St Mary's Church when the old town hall was demolished.

In the early 19th century, after the old town hall became dilapidated, civic leaders decided to replace it with a new structure in a similar position. The new building was designed in the neoclassical style, built in ashlar stone and was completed in 1809. The design involved a symmetrical main frontage of five bays facing onto the Market Square. The central bay, which was slightly projected forward, was fenestrated by a sash window on the ground floor and by a Venetian window on the first floor; it was surmounted by a pediment, with a roundel containing the borough coat of arms in the tympanum, and a ball finial. The bays flanking the central bay were fenestrated by sash windows on both floors, while the outer bays contained doorways with rectangular fanlights on the ground floor and were blind on the first floor. There was a parapet at roof level. Internally, the principal room was the council chamber on the first floor, which featured a moulded ceiling and a chandelier.

Higham Ferrers had a very small electorate and a dominant patron, William Fitzwilliam, 4th Earl Fitzwilliam, which meant it was recognised by the UK Parliament as a rotten borough. Its right to elect members of parliament was removed by the Reform Act 1832, and its borough council, which had met in the council chamber, was reformed under the Municipal Corporations Act 1883.

A war memorial, in the form of a stone column with a segmentally shaped pediment, which was intended to commemorate the lives of local service personnel who had died in the First World War was designed by Talbot, Brown & Fisher and unveiled outside the town hall on 11 November 1921. During the Second World War, a company of the 8th (Wellingborough District) Battalion of the Northamptonshire Home Guard were based in the building.

The building continued to serve as the meeting place of the borough council for much of the 20th century but ceased to be the local seat of government when the enlarged East Northamptonshire District Council was formed in 1974. It subsequently became the meeting place of Higham Ferrers Town Council. Queen Elizabeth II, accompanied by the Duke of Edinburgh, visited the town hall and met with civic leaders, in May 1985.

Works of art in the town hall include a portrait by Frank O. Salisbury of the mayor, John White, and a portrait by Solomon Joseph Solomon of Alderman Owen Parker.
