= Donald Pack =

British mathematician (1920–2016)

Professor Donald Pack

Prof Donald Cecil Pack CBE FRSE FEIS FIMA (1920–2016) was a 20th-century British mathematician who worked on supersonic airflows. He was one of the persons responsible for Strathclyde University receiving its university status and was its Vice Principal 1968 to 1972. He was one of the first to study the science associated with the sound barrier. In 1964 he was a joint founder of the Institute of Mathematics and its Applications (IMA).

== Life ==
He was born on 14 April 1920 at Higham Ferrers in Northamptonshire the son of John Pack and his wife, Minnie. He was educated at the local primary school then at Wellingborough School. He won a scholarship at studied mathematics at New College, Oxford graduating MA in 1941.

Upon graduation he went to do wartime research on anti-aircraft ballistics at Cambridge. In 1943 he transferred to the Armament Research and Development Establishment at Fort Halstead in Kent. From 1944 to 1946 he served as a captain with the British Army on the Rhine and began working on supersonic airflows.

In 1947 he began lecturing at Queen's College in Dundee (then linked to St Andrews University).

In 1953 he replaced Prof Albert Price in the 1812 Chair in Mathematics at the University of Strathclyde (aged only 33) and was succeeded by Gary Roach in 1985.

In 1954 he was elected a Fellow of the Royal Society of Edinburgh.

He played an important role in the founding of the Institute of Mathematics and its Applications in 1964, and was the first treasurer of the Institute from its founding in 1964 until 1972.

From 1968 to 1976 he was Chairman of the Scottish Certificate of Education Examination Board. From 1974 to 1977 he was Chairman of the Committee of Inquiry into Truancy and Indiscipline in Schools in Scotland from which developed "The Pack Report" (named in his honour). From 1977 to 1981 he was Governor of Hamilton College of Education.

In 1978 Queen Elizabeth II created him a Commander of the Order of the British Empire.

He retired in 1982 and died at Antonine House in Bearsden on 3 December 2016.

== Family ==
In 1947 he married Constance ("Connie") Gillam (d. 2010). They had three children. They were married for 63 years.

== Publications ==
- On the Formation of Shock-Waves in Supersonic Gas Jets, The Quarterly Journal of Mechanics and Applied Mathematics, Volume 1, Issue 1, 1948, Pages 1–17
- A Short History of the Department of Mathematics by D C Pack, pamphlet published by The University of Strathclyde, 1975
