= 1821 Coronation Honours =

British government recognitions

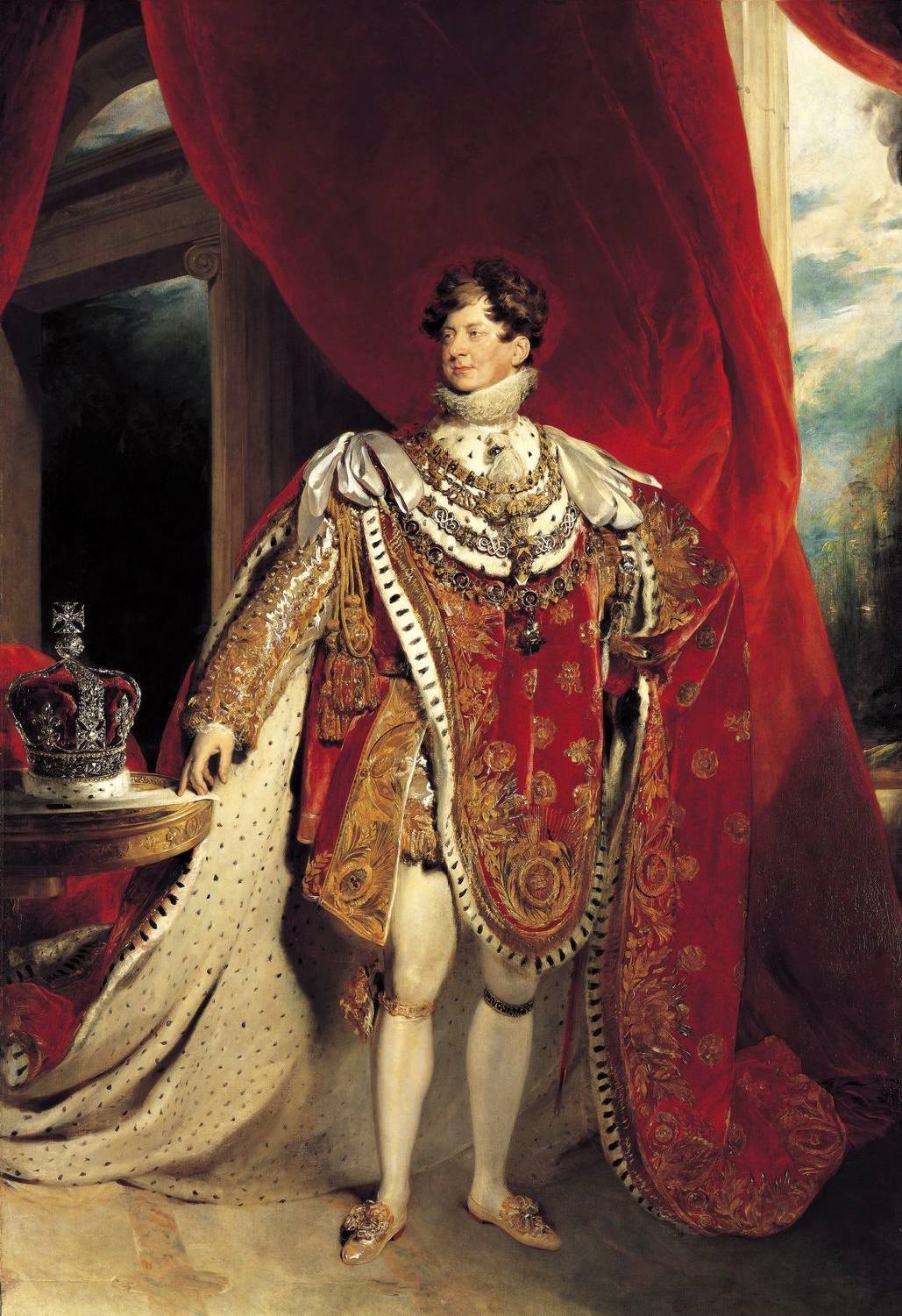
Coronation portrait of King George IV

The 1821 Coronation Honours were appointments by King George IV to various orders and honours on the occasion of his coronation on 19 July 1821. The honours were published in The London Gazette on 14, 24 and 28 July 1821.

The recipients of honours are displayed here as they were styled before their new honour.

== United Kingdom and British Empire ==
=== Viscount, Earl, and Marquess ===
- Charles, Earl of Ailesbury KT by the names, styles, and titles of Viscount Savernake, of Savernake Forest, in the county of Wilts, Earl Bruce, of Whorlton, in the county of York, and Marquess of Ailesbury, in the county of Buckingham

=== Earl ===
- Edward, Viscount Falmouth, by the name, style, and title of, Earl of Falmouth, in the county of Cornwall
- Richard William Penn, Viscount Curzon, by the name, style, and title of Earl Howe

=== Viscount and Earl ===
- John Somers, Baron Somers, by the names, styles, and titles of Viscount Eastnor, of Eastnor Castle, in the county of Hereford, and Earl Somers
- John Baron Rous, by the names, styles, and titles of Viscount Dumwich and Earl of Stradbroke, in the county of Suffolk

=== Viscount ===
- Richard, Earl of Donoughmore, by the name, style, and title of Viscount Hutchinson, of Knocklofty, in the county of Tipperary

=== Baron ===
- William, Marquess of Lothian KT by the name, style, and title of Baron Ker, of Kersheugh, in the county of Roxburgh
- Henry, Marquess Conyngham KP by the name, style, and title of Baron Minster, of Minster Abbey, in the county of Kent
- James, Earl of Ormonde and Ossory, by the name, style, and title of Baron Ormonde, of Llanthony, in the county of Monmouth
- Francis, Earl of Wemyss and March, by the name, style, and title of Baron Wemyss, of Wemyss, in the county of Fife
- Robert, Earl of Roden KP by the name, style, and title of Baron Clanbrassill, of Hyde Hall, in the county of Hertford, and Dundalk, in the county of Louth
- George, Earl of Kingston, by the name, style, and title of Baron Kingston, of Mitchelstown, in the county of Cork
- Thomas, Earl of Longford KP by the name, style and title of Baron Silchester, of Silchester, in the county of Southampton
- Lord James Murray, by the name, style, and title of Baron Glenlyon of Glenlyon, in the county of Perth
- The Right Honourable William Wellesley-Pole, by the name, style, and title of Baron Maryborough, of Maryborough, in the Queen's County.
- The Right Honourable John Foster, by the name, style, and title of Baron Oriel, of Ferrard, in the county of Louth
- The Right Honourable Sir William Scott Kt by the name, style, and title of Baron Stowell, of Stowell Park, in the county of Gloucester
- Sir Thomas Henry Liddell Bt by the name, style, and title of Baron Ravensworth, of Ravensworth Castle, in the county palatine of Durham, and of Eslington, in the county of Northumberland
- Thomas Cholmondeley, of Vale Royal, in the county palatine of Chester, by the name, style, and title of Baron Delamere, of Vale Royal, in the said county
- Cecil Weld-Forester, of Willey Park, in the county of Shropshire, by the name, style, and title of Baron Forester, of Willey Park, in the said county

=== Baroness ===
- Lady Charlotte Mary Gertrude Strutt, by the name, style, and title of Baroness Rayleigh, of Terling Place in the county of Essex

=== Baronetcies ===
- Major-General Sir Edward Kerrison Kt of Wyke House in the county of Sussex
- Sir Harry Niven Lumsden Kt of Auchindour, in the county of Aberdeen
- Thomas Francis Fremantle, of Swanbourne, in the county of Buckingham
- John Dugdale Astley, of Everleigh, in the county of Wiltshire
- Alexander Boswell, of Auchinleck, in the county of Ayr
- Robert Shaw, of Bushy Park, in the county of Dublin
- Arthur Chichester, of Greencastle, in the county of Donegal
- George Pocock, of Hart, in the county palatine of Durham, and of Twickenham, in the county of Middlesex
- William George Hylton Jolliffe, of Merstham in the county of Surrey
- Robert Townsend Farquhar, Governor and Commander in Chief in and over the Island of Mauritius
- Major Thomas Trayton Fuller-Eliott-Drake, of Nutwell Court, Buckland Abbey, of Monachorum, Sherford, and Yarcombe, in the county of Devon
- John Eardley Eardley-Wilmot, of Berkswell Hall, in the county of Warwick
- Robert Dundas, of Beechwood, in the county of Midlothian
- Colonel James Carmichael-Smyth, of Nutwood, in the county of Surrey
- David Erskine, of Cambo, in the county of Fife
- William Young, of Bailieborough Castle, in the county of Cavan
- John D'Oyly, of Kandy, in the inland of Ceylon
- David William Smith, of the province of Upper Canada, and of Preston, in the county of Northumberland
- Astley Paston Cooper, of Gadesbridge, in the county of Hertford, Surgeon to His Majesty's Person
- Thomas Phillipps, of Middle Hill, in the county of Worcester
- John Dean Paul, of Rodborough, in the county of Gloucester, and of the Strand, in the county of Middlesex
- Coutts Trotter, of West Ville, in the county of Lincoln
- Claude Scott, of Lytchet Minster, in the county of Dorset
- George Blackman, of Harley Street, in the county of Middlesex

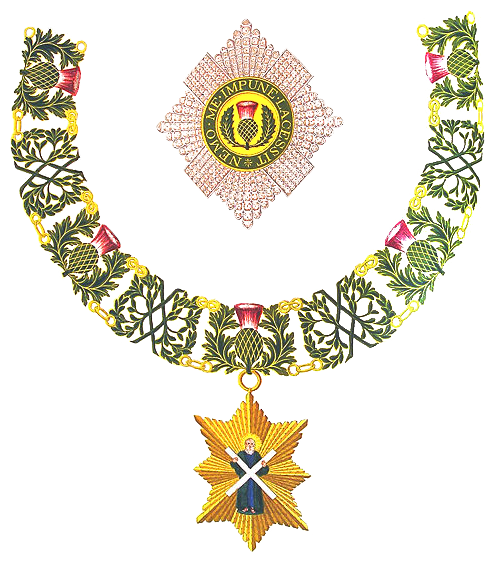
Insignia of Knight of the Thistle

=== The Most Ancient and Most Noble Order of the Thistle ===
==== Knight of the Most Ancient and Most Noble Order of the Thistle (KT) ====
- Charles, Marquess of Queensberry
- Archibald, Earl of Cassilis
- James, Earl of Lauderdale
- Robert, Viscount Melville
