= Catherine Edward =

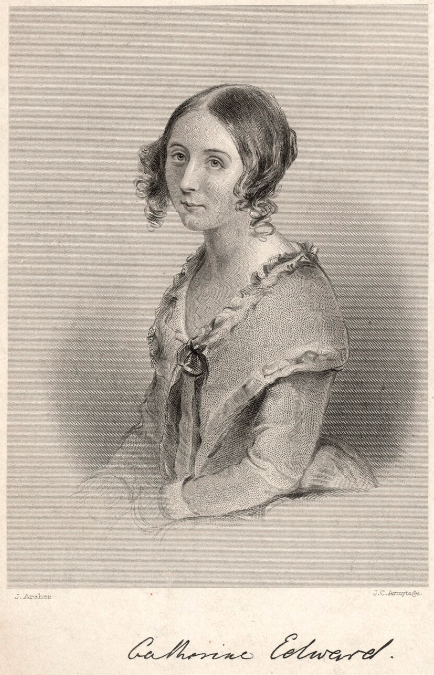
- from her autobiography
- Born: 2 April 1813
- Died: 21 February 1861 (aged 47); Wrocław
- Occupation: governess
- Known for: missionary in Silesia
- Spouse: Daniel Edward
- Children: five

Catherine Edward born Catherine Grant (2 April 1813 – 21 February 1861) was a Free Church of Scotland missionary to the Jews in Iași in Moldavia and later Galicia and Silesia.

== Life ==
Her parents, Patrick and Isabella (born Mitchell) Grant, were living in Kirkmichael, Banffshire when she was born. Her father was the minister there but he died when she was very small and her mother went to live in Edinburgh. Her mother had an income from an annuity and she also took in lodgers.

She worked as a governess for the Reverend Principal Nicoll and then took a similar role for Lord William Douglas, leaving that employment at the end of 1843.

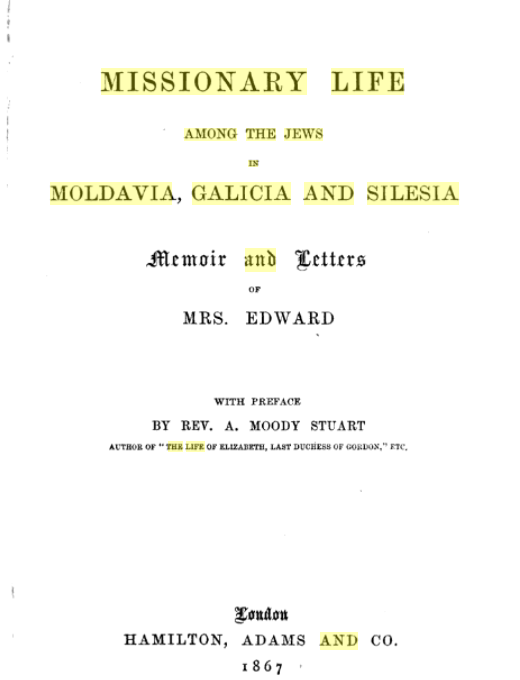
Catherine Edward's Missionary Life Among the Jews in Moldavia, Galicia and Silesia

She returned to live with her brother, William Grant of the Free Church in Ayr, and through him she met Daniel Edward who was a missionary to the Jews in Moldavia. Edward was a graduate of Edinburgh and Berlin. She was interested in his work and she joined him later in Germany where they were married on 25 August 1846. Together they went on to Iași (Jassy), the capital of Moldavia, where her new husband's mission was based. Progress was slow and there were few converts and they abandoned the work in Iași in 1848. Her memoirs reveal that she had little regard for the Jews she was trying to convert. She described them as "filthy", "cunning" and "indolent". There was a cholera outbreak and war appeared a possibility in Iași.

They moved on to work in Galicia and Silesia. At the start of 1852 they were thrown out of Austria. The work and her children was said to have visibly aged her when she returned to Scotland in 1852 and her role in the missionary work was reduced.

== Death and legacy ==
Edward died in Wrocław. In 1867 her biography, Missionary Life Among the Jews in Moldavia, Galicia and Silesia, was published including some of her letters. The biography had a preface by Alexander Moody Stuart who was the convener of the Jewish Mission of the Free Church. The book included her portrait.
