= Charles Douglas, 6th Marquess of Queensberry =

Scottish peer

The Most Honourable The Marquess of Queensberry KT
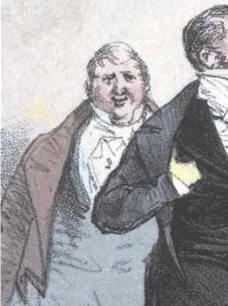
- The Marquess of Queensberry at an Almack's ball, 1815
- Born: March 1777; United Kingdom
- Died: 3 December 1837 (aged 60); St James's Place, London
- Occupation: Scottish peer
- Spouse: Lady Caroline Scott (m. 1803)
- Children: 8
- Parent(s): Sir William Douglas, 4th Baronet; Grace Johnstone
- Relatives: Sir John Douglas, 3rd Baronet (grandfather); Arthur Johnstone-Douglas (grandson)

Charles Douglas, 6th Marquess of Queensberry, KT (March 1777 – 3 December 1837), known as Sir Charles Douglas, 5th Baronet between 1783 and 1810, was a Scottish peer and member of Clan Douglas.

== Early life ==
Douglas was the eldest son and heir of Sir William Douglas, 4th Baronet, and his wife, Grace, née Johnstone, of Lockerbie. Among his four brothers and four sisters were John Douglas, 7th Marquess of Queensberry and Lord William Douglas, MP for Dumfries Burghs.

His mother was the eldest daughter and co-heiress of William Johnstone of Lockerbie. His paternal grandparents were Sir John Douglas, 3rd Baronet of Kelhead, MP for Dumfriesshire, and the former Christian Cunningham (a daughter of Sir William Cunningham, 2nd Baronet of Caprington).

== Career ==
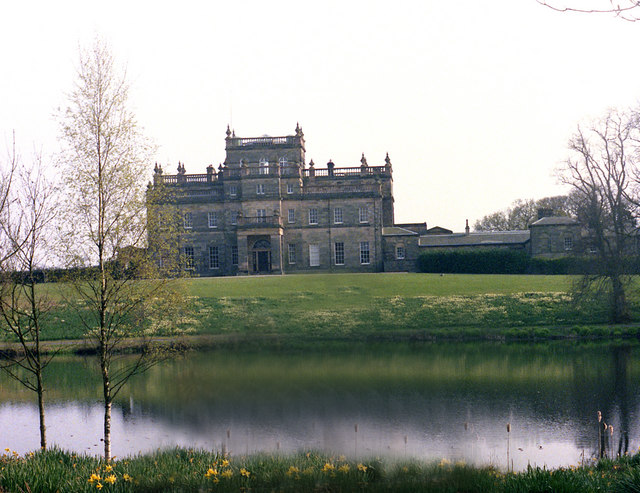
Kinmount House, seat of the 6th Marquess of Queensberry

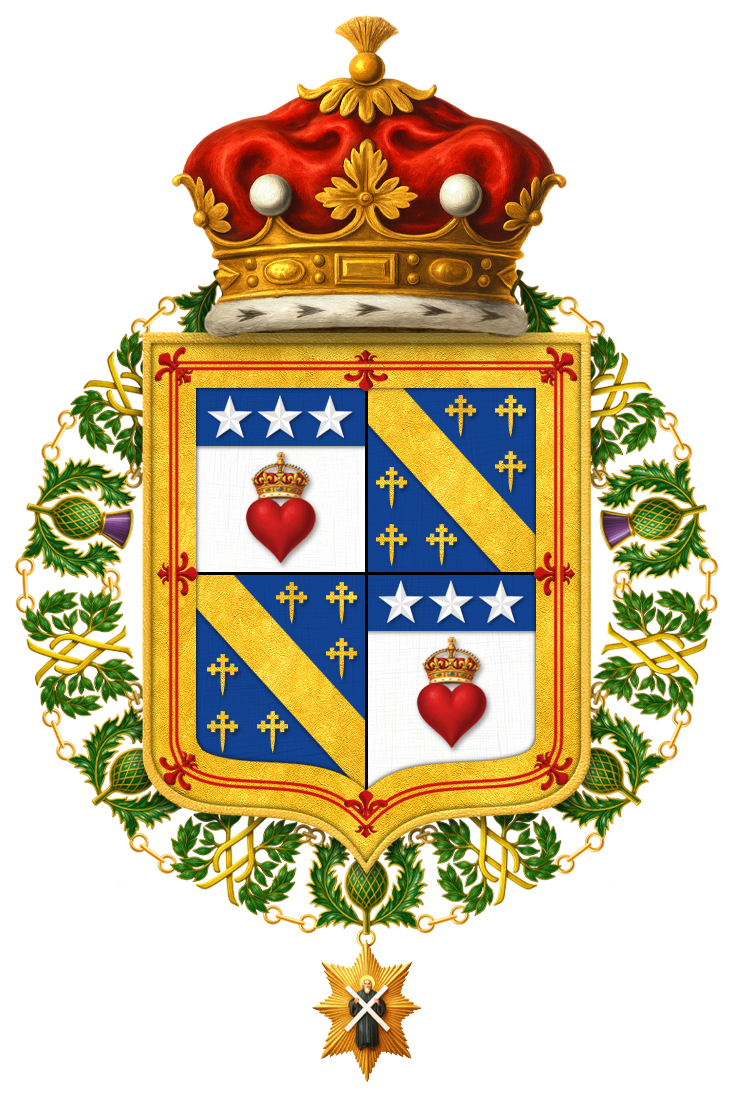
Shield of Arms of Charles Douglas, 6th Marquess of Queensberry, KT

Upon his father's death in 1783, he inherited the baronetcy of Kelhead. In 1810, he succeeded his fourth cousin once removed, William Douglas, 4th Duke of Queensberry, as Marquess of Queensberry. Upon simultaneously inheriting Kinmount House, he commissioned a new house to be built by the English architect Sir Robert Smirke, which served as the seat for subsequent Marquesses of Queensberry and still stands.

From 1812 to 1832, he was a Scottish representative peer. He was made a Knight of the Thistle in the 1821 Coronation Honours and created Baron Solway, of Kinmount, in the County of Dumfries, in 1833. From 1831 to 1837, he served as Gentleman of the Bedchamber to William IV, a position which a member of Clan Douglas had occupied intermittently since the late seventeenth century.

As Marquess of Queensberry, Douglas also acted as Lord Lieutenant of the County of Dumfries, Colonel of the Dumfries Militia and director of the Royal Scottish Academy.

== Personal life ==
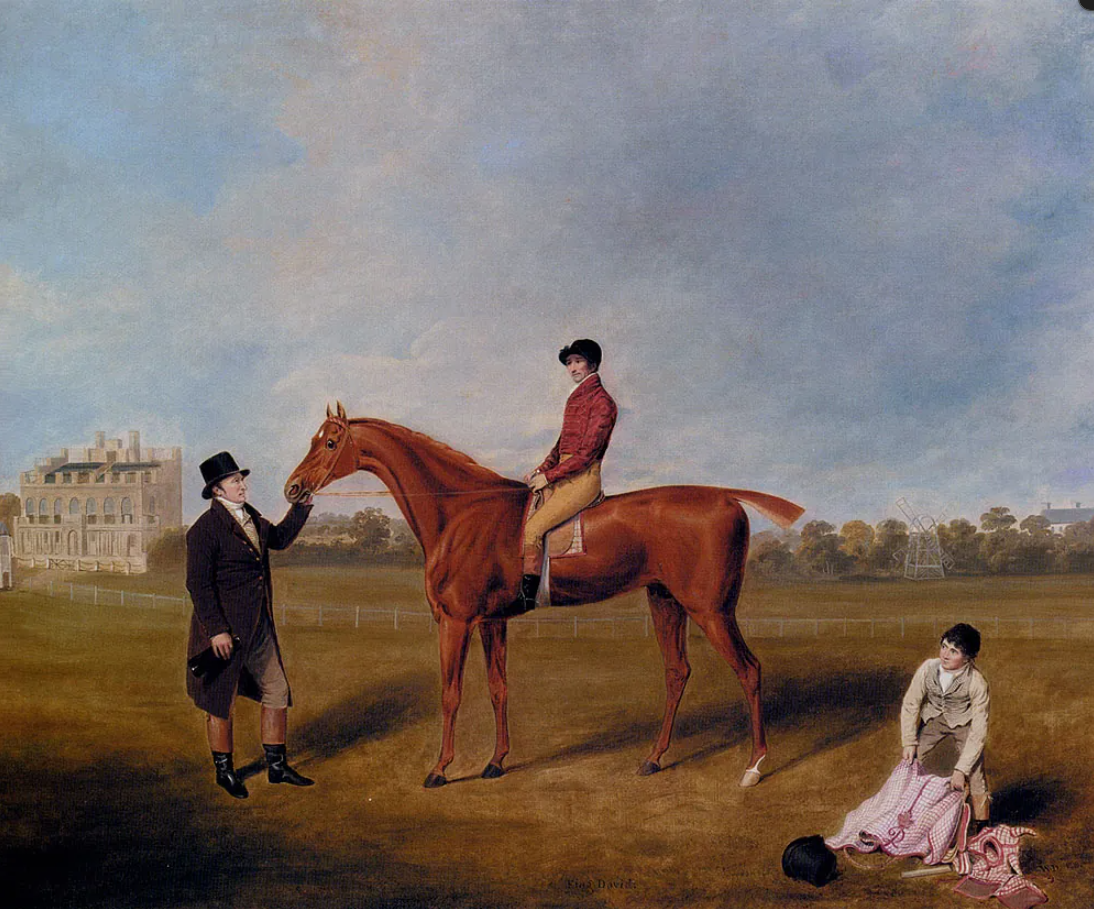
The Marquis of Queensberry's King David with Jockey Up and held by a Trainer at Newcastle by W. H. Davis, 1818

On 13 August 1803, he married Lady Caroline Scott (1774–1854), the third daughter of Henry Scott, 3rd Duke of Buccleuch and Lady Elizabeth Montagu (the only daughter of George Montagu, 1st Duke of Montagu and Mary Montagu, Countess of Cardigan). Together, they had eight daughters, including:

- Lady Caroline Elizabeth Douglas (1804–1811), who died young.
- Lady Louisa Anne Douglas (1806–1871), who married Thomas Charlton Whitmore, an English Tory MP, in 1833.
- Lady Mary Elizabeth Douglas (1807–1888), who married the Rev. Thomas Wentworth Gage, Vicar of Higham Ferrers in 1831.
- Lady Harriet Christian Douglas (1809–1902), who married Augustus Duncombe, the Dean of York from 1858 to 1880.
- Lady Jane Margaret Mary Douglas (1811–1881), who married her cousin, Robert Johnston-Douglas, in 1841; parents of Arthur Johnstone-Douglas.
- Lady Frances Caroline Douglas (d. 1827), who died unmarried.
- Lady Elizabeth Katinka Douglas (d. 1874), who married Henry St George Foote in 1861.
- Lady Anne Georgina Douglas (1817–1899), who married Charles Stirling-Home-Drummond-Moray of Abercairney, in 1845.

After a period of ill health, Queensberry died at his home at St James's Place, London in December 1837. The marquessate and baronetcy passed to his brother, John Douglas, 7th Marquess of Queensberry, while the barony of Solway became extinct.

Honorary titles
Preceded by The Duke of Buccleuch	Lord Lieutenant of Dumfries; 1819–1837	Succeeded by The Marquess of Queensberry
Baronetage of Nova Scotia
Preceded by William Douglas	Baronet (of Kelhead); 1783–1837	Succeeded by John Douglas
Peerage of Scotland
Preceded by William Douglas	Marquess of Queensberry; 1810–1837	Succeeded by John Douglas
Peerage of the United Kingdom
New title	Baron Solway; 1833–1837	Extinct
