= Sir William Douglas, 4th Baronet =

British politician (1730–1783)

Sir William Douglas Bt
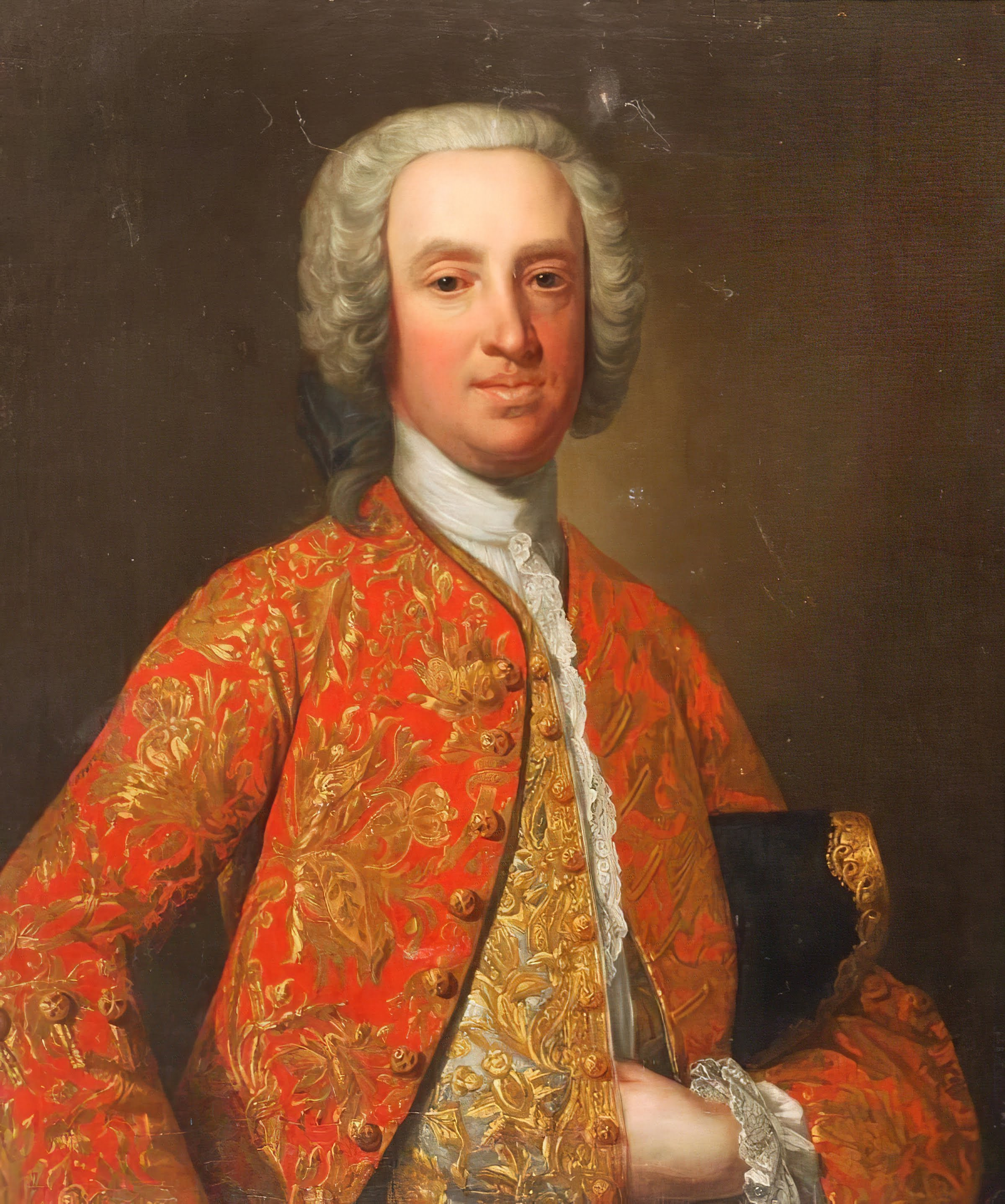

Member of Parliament for Dumfries Burghs
- In office 1768–1780
- Preceded by: Sir James Montgomery
- Succeeded by: Sir Robert Herries

Personal details
- Born: c. 1730
- Died: 16 May 1783 (aged 52–53)
- Spouse: Grace Johnstone (after 1772)
- Relations: Archibald Douglas, 8th Marquess of Queensberry (grandson)
- Children: 9, including Charles, John and William
- Parent(s): Sir John Douglas; Christian Cunningham
- Education: Glasgow University

Sir William Douglas, 4th Baronet (c. 1730 – 16 May 1783) was a British politician who represented Dumfries Burghs in the House of Commons of Great Britain from 1768 to 1780.

== Early life ==
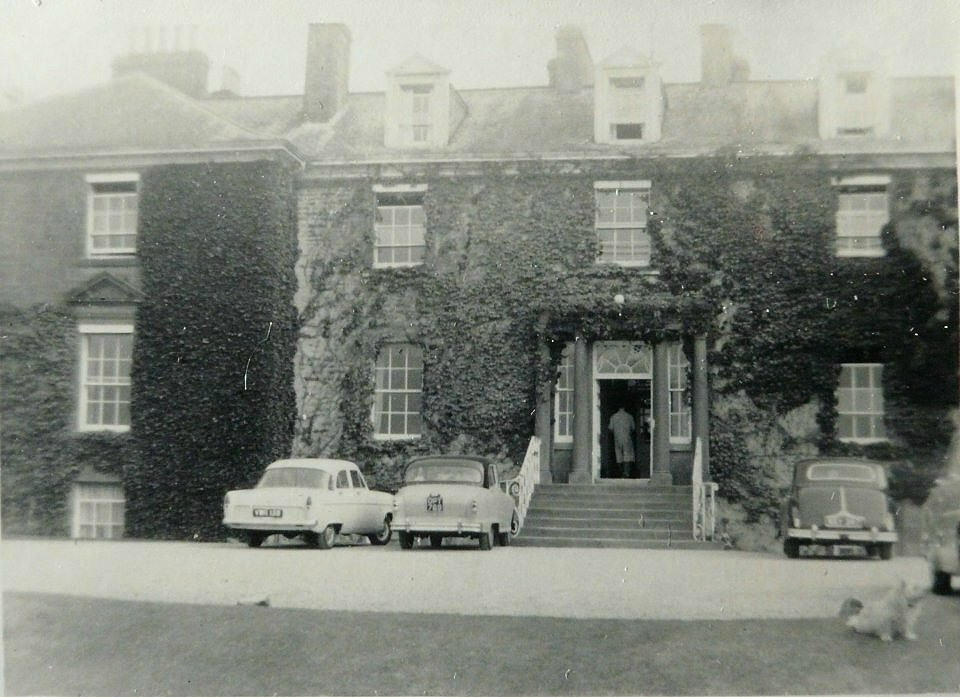
Lockerbie House Hotel, 1959

The son of Sir John Douglas, 3rd Baronet and his wife, Christian Cunningham, daughter of Sir William Cunningham, 2nd Baronet, he was a descendant of Lady Catherine Douglas, sister of William Douglas, 1st Duke of Queensberry.

Sir William was educated at Glasgow University.

== Career ==
He served as Member of Parliament for Dumfries Burghs between 1768 and 1780. He succeeded his uncle Charles Douglas, a wealthy East India Company merchant to his Breconwhat estate in Dumfries in 1770. Sir William later commissioned the building of Lockerbie House. He was also a favourite of his relative the Duke of Queensberry, who bequeathed to him £16,000 upon his death in October 1778.

== Personal life ==
On 21 March 1772, Douglas was married to Grace Johnstone, a daughter of William Johnstone. Together, they were the parents of five sons and four daughters, including:

- Lady Mary Douglas (d. 1841), who married Maj.-Gen. Sir Thomas Sydney Beckwith, son of Maj.-Gen. John Beckwith, in 1817.
- Charles Douglas, 6th Marquess of Queensberry (1777–1837), who married Lady Caroline Scott, the third daughter of Henry Scott, 3rd Duke of Buccleuch and Lady Elizabeth Montagu (the only daughter of George Montagu, 1st Duke of Montagu and Mary Montagu, Countess of Cardigan).
- John Douglas, 7th Marquess of Queensberry (1779–1856), who married Sarah Douglas, daughter of Maj. James Sholto Douglas, in 1817.
- Henry Alexander Douglas (1781–1837), who married Elizabeth Dalzell, a daughter of Robert Dalzell, in 1812. (Note: Robert Dalzell (1755–1808), would have become the 7th Earl of Carnwath in 1787, but for his grandfather's 1717 attainder.)
- Lord William Douglas (1783–1859), an MP for Dumfries Burghs; he married Elizabeth Irvine, daughter of Walter Irvine, in 1824.

Sir William died on 16 May 1783.

Parliament of the United Kingdom
Preceded by James Montgomery	Member of Parliament for Dumfries Burghs; 1768–1780	Succeeded by Sir Robert Herries
Baronetage of Nova Scotia
Preceded by John Douglas	Baronet (of Kelhead); 1778–1783	Succeeded by Charles Douglas
