= Sir John Douglas, 3rd Baronet, of Kelhead =

Sir John Douglas, 3rd Baronet
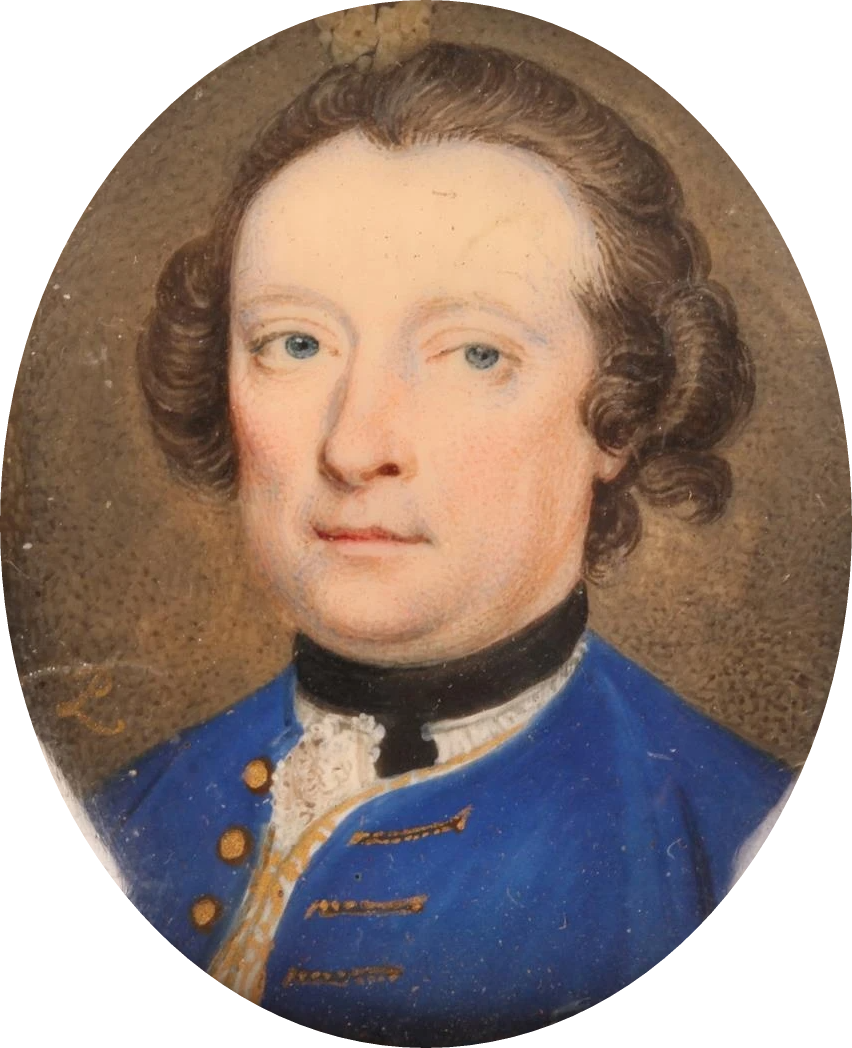
- Tenure: 1733 to 1778
- Predecessor: Sir William Douglas, 2nd Baronet of Kelhead (c. 1675-1733)
- Successor: Sir William Douglas (1731-1783)
- Born: 1708; Kelhead, Annan
- Died: 13 November 1778 (aged 70); Drumlanrig
- Residence: Kelhead, Annan
- Locality: Galloway
- Offices: Member of Parliament for Dumfriesshire 1741 to 1747
- Spouse: Christina Cunningham (c. 1710–1741)
- Issue: William (1731-1783), Charles (c. 1732-1775), Stair (c. 1735-1789)
- Parents: Sir William Douglas, 2nd Baronet of Kelhead (c. 1675-1733); Helen Erskine (1695-1764)

Sir John Douglas, 3rd Baronet (c. 1708 – 13 November 1778) came from a junior branch of the Douglas family and was related to the Dukes of Queensberry. In 1741, he was elected Member of Parliament for Dumfriesshire, a borough controlled by the Queensberry interest.

Like many members of the Tory party, he was a Jacobite sympathiser and his brothers Erskine (c. 1725-1791) and Francis (c. 1726-1793) participated in the 1745 Rising. He was arrested in August 1746 after Murray of Broughton provided evidence he visited Charles outside Stirling in January. Released in 1748 without charge, he was excluded from the 1747 Act of Indemnity and forced to resign his seat.

Constantly in financial difficulty, Douglas was imprisoned for debt in January 1778 and died in November; he was succeeded by his son William.

== Life ==
Douglas was born in Kelhead, Annan, the eldest son of Sir William Douglas, 2nd Baronet of Kelhead (c. 1675-1733) and Helen Erskine (1685-1764). His grandfather, James Douglas, was a son of William Douglas of Kelhead, second son of the 1st Earl of Queensberry.

He married Christian (1710-1741), daughter of Sir William Cunningham; they had eight children before her death in 1741, including William (1731-1783), Charles (c. 1732-1775), Stair (c. 1735-1789), Catherine, Janet and Helen.

== Career ==
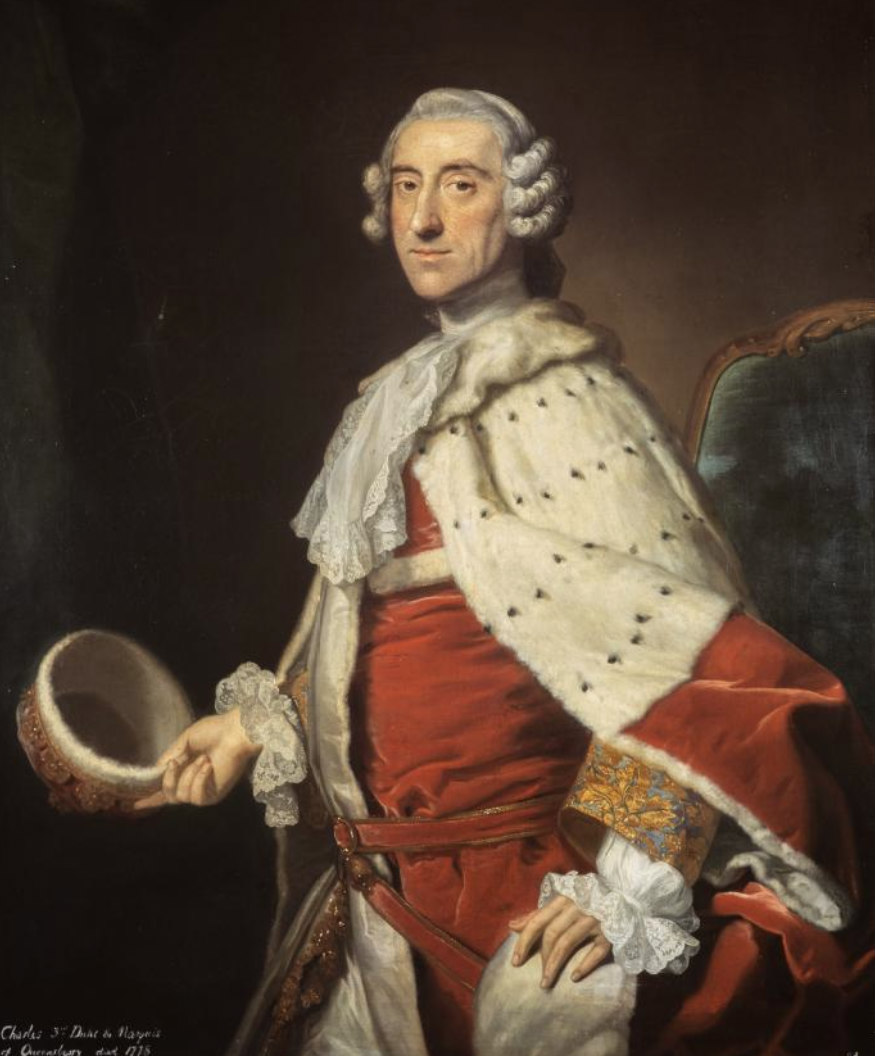
Sir John's relative Charles Douglas, Duke of Queensberry(1698-1778); Douglas managed his political affairs in Dumfriesshire

Douglas managed Queensberry's political affairs in Dumfriesshire and was a member of the Tory or 'Country' party, largely excluded from government from 1715 to 1760. The decline of Robert Walpole in the late 1730s gave the Tories hope of power for the first time in 25 years and in 1741, Douglas was returned as Member of Parliament for Dumfriesshire. In February 1742, Walpole was ousted by a coalition of Tories and Patriot Whigs, who promptly did a deal with their Whig colleagues to exclude them from the new government, known as the Broad Bottom ministry.

Fury at this led many Tories to seek support from the exiled Stuarts; Douglas was related by marriage or blood to a number of those involved in the 1745 Rising, including James Maxwell of Kirkconnell, Lord Elcho and the 5th Earl of Traquair (1699-1764). In January 1746, Douglas visited Charles during the siege of Stirling. Despite their failure to join the invasion of England, he brought messages of support from the English Jacobite leaders Lord Barrymore and Sir Watkin Williams Wynn, and assurances £10,000 was in London 'awaiting (his) use.' Murray of Broughton, who arranged the meeting, later stated he was surprised, 'never having suspected (Douglas) to be in the Pretender's interest.'

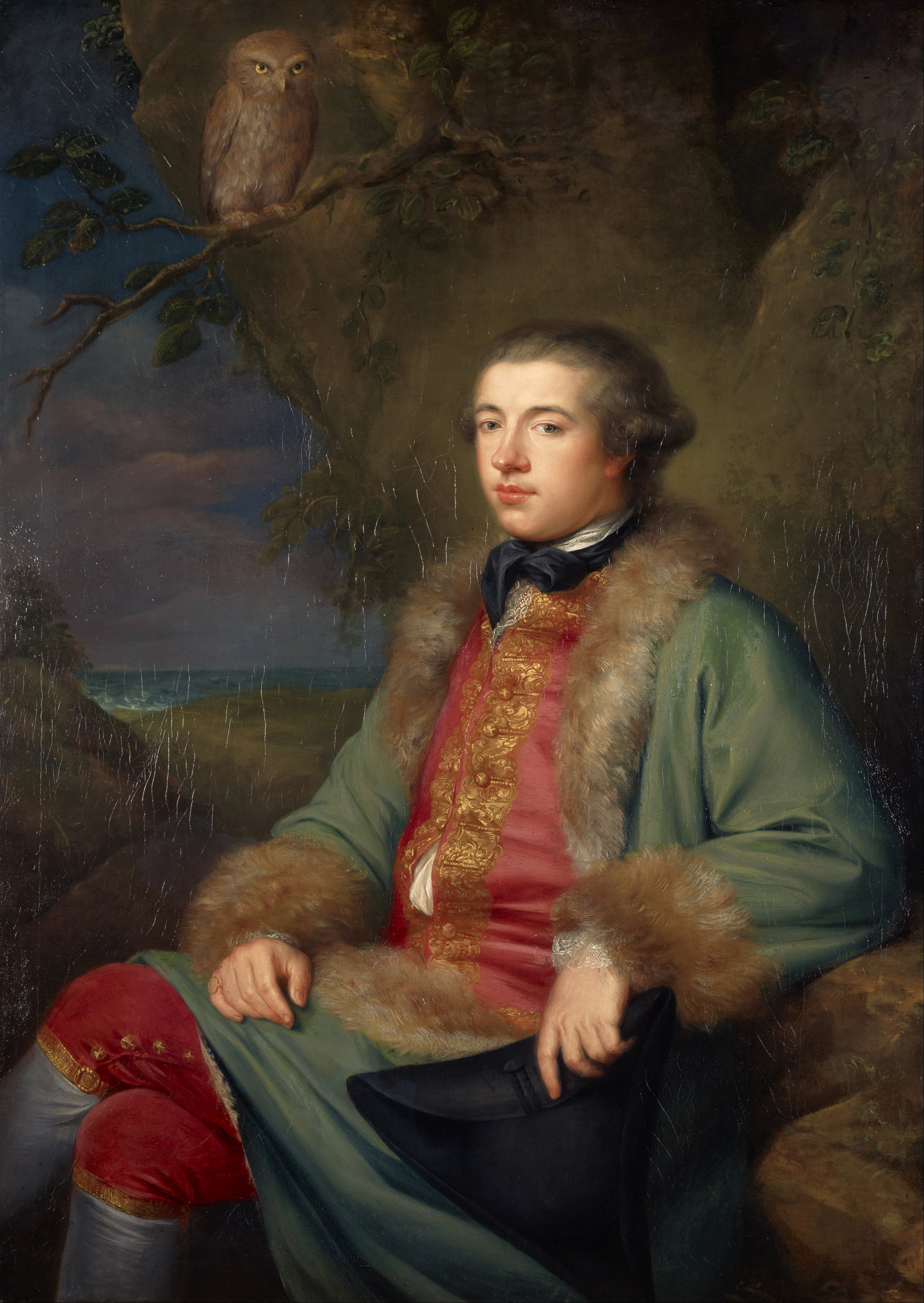
Douglas' distant relative, the biographer James Boswell, who wrote he was "a lively man, but hurried away by fanciful project."

Based on Murray's testimony, Douglas was arrested on 14 August and committed to the Tower of London; when questioned, he refused to answer on the grounds that 'being no lawyer, he doth not think fit to give any.' One famous anecdote is that when asked if he knew Murray, Douglas responded 'once I knew...a Murray of Broughton, but that was a gentleman and a man of honour.' This appears in Tales of a Grandfather, a history of Scotland written for his grandson by novelist Sir Walter Scott; while the timeline of events is broadly accurate, many of its anecdotes are not and there is no independent source for this.

Douglas was released in June 1748 but excluded from the 1747 Act of Indemnity, which ended his political career and he was replaced as MP for Dumfriesshire by Queensberry's second son, Lord Charles Douglas (1726-1756). His trial and the execution of Lovat were a warning to others and ended the practice whereby senior Tories like the Duke of Beaufort could in theory support the overthrow of their own government and institutions with impunity. Sir Watkin Williams Wynn shows why the government considered this necessary; in late 1747, he wrote to Charles claiming his supporters wished for 'another happy opportunity wherein they may exert themselves more in deeds than in words, in the support of your Royal Highness's dignity and interest and the cause of liberty.'

An inability to manage finances and the need to provide for his numerous brothers and sisters meant Douglas was perpetually short of money. In 1745, the family tutor, James Hogg, took his four sons to Glasgow and sent the two eldest to university, paying their expenses himself. His time in prison gained him considerable sympathy; Queensberry allowed him to live at Drumlanrig and reached a deal with his creditors by putting a trustee in charge of his estates.

This proved a short-term solution; in October 1762, his distant relative, biographer and author James Boswell, recorded that "by his princely improvements [of the estate] Sir John Douglas has burthened his estate with about £30,000... a lively man, but hurried away by fanciful project." Scottish legal records show continual litigation between Sir John and his creditors and his estates were sequestered once again in 1758.

Douglas' younger brother Charles Douglas was a wealthy East India merchant who died in 1770 and left his property to John's eldest son William Douglas. William was also a favourite of Queensberry, who left him £16,000 when he died in October 1778; his son's prospects allowed John to borrow large sums of money but he was imprisoned for debt in January 1778. He died in November 1778, one month after Queensberry's death in October.

== Sources ==
- Colley, Linda (2008). In Defiance of Oligarchy: The Tory Party 1714-60. Cambridge University Press. ISBN 978-0521313117.
- Dick, Alex (1897). Curiosities of a Scots Charta Chest, 1600-1800: With the Travels and Memoranda of Sir Alexander. Brown.
- Forbes, John. The History of Parliament: the House of Commons 1715-1754.
- MacLeod, Walter (1746). List of persons concerned in the rebellion, transmitted to the Commissioners of Excise by the several supervisors in Scotland in obedience to a general letter of the 7th May 1746; Volume 8. Sagwan Press. ISBN 978-1340085940.
- Murray, John (1898). Bell, Robert Fitzroy (ed.). Memorials of John Murray of Broughton: Sometime Secretary to Prince Charles Edward, 1740-1747. T. and A. Constable at the Edinburgh University Press for the Scottish History Society. OCLC 879747289.
- Zimmerman, Doron (2003). The Jacobite Movement in Scotland and in Exile, 1746-1759. Palgrave Macmillan. ISBN 978-1403912916.

Parliament of Great Britain
| Preceded by Charles Erskine | Member of Parliament for Dumfriesshire; 1741–1747 | Succeeded by Lord Charles Douglas |
Baronetage of Nova Scotia
| Preceded by William Douglas | Baronet (of Kelhead); 1733–1778 | Succeeded by William Douglas |
