= Lord William Douglas =

Scottish politician and landowner

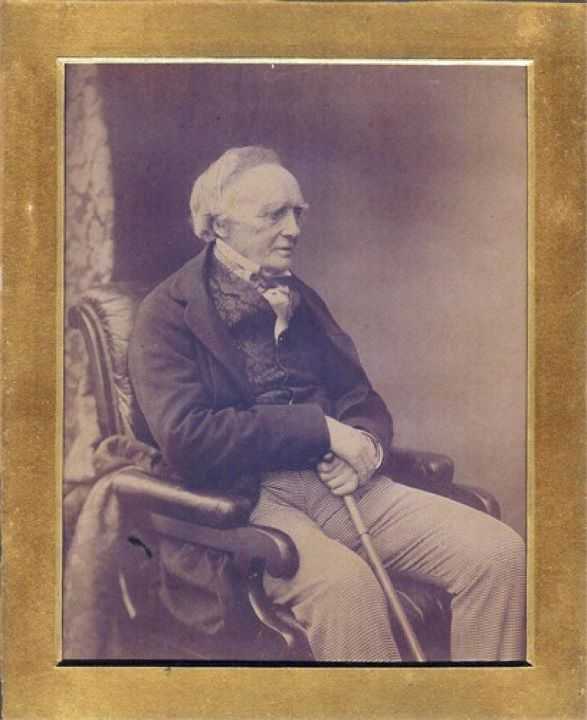
- Lord William Robert Keith Douglas, circa 1855

Lord Commissioners of the Admiralty
- In office 2 May 1827
- In office 16 February 1824
- In office 8 February 1822

Member of Parliament
- In office 1812–1832
- Monarchs: George III; George IV; William IV
- Prime Minister: Earl of Liverpool; George Canning; The Viscount Goderich; The Duke of Wellington; The Earl Grey
- Preceded by: Sir John Heron-Maxwell
- Succeeded by: Matthew Sharpe
- Constituency: Dumfries Burghs

Personal details
- Born: William Robert Keith Douglas; 6 March 1783
- Died: 5 December 1859 (aged 76)
- Resting place: Dunino, Fife
- Spouse: Elizabeth Irvine (m. 1824)
- Children: William Douglas-Irvine; Walter Douglas-Irvine; Charles Irvine Douglas
- Parents: Sir William Douglas, 4th Baronet (father); Grace Johnstone (mother)
- Relatives: 6th Marquess of Queensberry (brother); 7th Marquess of Queensberry (brother)
- Awards: Fellow of the Royal Society (1826)

Lord William Robert Keith Douglas (6 March 1783 – 5 December 1859) was a Scottish politician and landowner. He was the fourth son of Sir William Douglas, 4th Baronet of Kelhead and younger brother of both Charles Douglas, 6th Marquess of Queensberry and John Douglas, 7th Marquess of Queensberry. He represented the Dumfries Burghs constituency between 1812 and 1832 and served, on a number of occasions, as one of the Lord Commissioners of the Admiralty. He owned sugar plantation estates in Tobago which had formerly belonged to Walter Irvine, whose daughter, Elizabeth, he married on 24 November 1824. They had three sons, the second of which, Walter, went on to continue the Douglases of Grangemuir. He employed the future missionary Catherine Grant (later Edward) as a governess until 1843.

On 9 March 1826 he was elected as fellow of the Royal Society.

According to the Legacies of British Slave-Ownership at the University College London, Douglas was awarded a payment in the aftermath of the Slavery Abolition Act 1833 with the Slave Compensation Act 1837. The British Government took out a £15 million loan (worth £1.54 billion in 2025) with interest from Nathan Mayer Rothschild and Moses Montefiore that was subsequently paid off by the British taxpayers (ending in 2015). Douglas was associated with three different claims he owned 576 slaves in Tobago and received a £10,907 payment at the time (worth £1.12 million in 2025).

In May 1837, some time after William Douglas's eldest brother succeeded to the Marquessate of Queensberry, he was granted a patent of precedence which gave him the rank and style of a Marquess's younger son (Lord William Douglas).

Lord William is buried at Dunino, Fife, a village close to his family seat at Grangemuir, near Pittenweem.

== See also ==
- Douglases of Grangemuir

Parliament of the United Kingdom
Preceded by John Shaw Stewart Heron-Maxwell	Member of Parliament for Dumfries Burghs; 1812–1832	Succeeded by Matthew Sharpe
