= Higham Ferrers =

Market town in Northamptonshire, England

Coordinates: 52.3057°N 0.5844°W

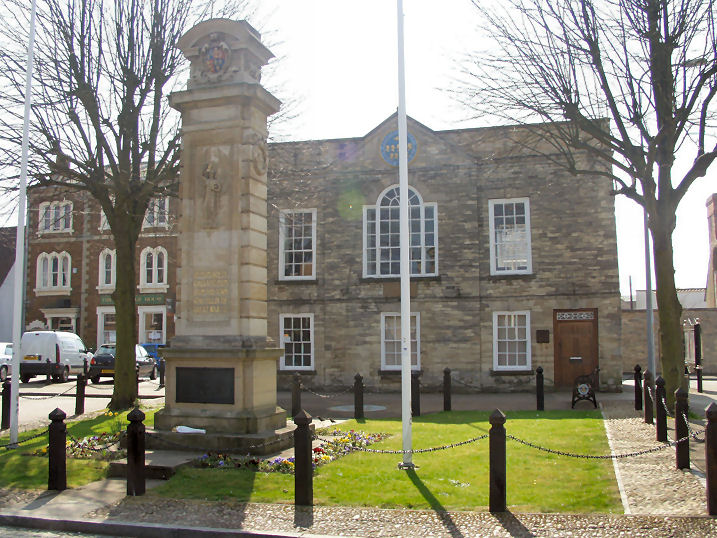
- Higham Ferrers Town Hall and War Memorial

- Location within Northamptonshire
- Population: 8,083 (2011 Census)
- OS grid reference: SP9668
- Civil parish: Higham Ferrers
- Unitary authority: North Northamptonshire
- Ceremonial county: Northamptonshire
- Region: East Midlands
- Country: England
- Sovereign state: United Kingdom
- Post town: RUSHDEN
- Postcode district: NN10
- Dialling code: 01933
- Police: Northamptonshire
- Fire: Northamptonshire
- Ambulance: East Midlands
- UK Parliament: Wellingborough and Rushden

Higham Ferrers is a market town and civil parish in the Nene Valley in North Northamptonshire, England, close to the Cambridgeshire and Bedfordshire borders. It forms a single built-up area with Rushden to the south and had a population of 8,827 at the 2021 census. The town centre contains many historic buildings around the Market Square and College Street.

== History ==
The town's name means 'High homestead/village'. The Ferrers family are mentioned in connection with the town in 1166. The hundred is named after Higham Ferrers, but the site of the meeting-place is unknown.

The first Charter of 1251 was due to the Lord of the Manor, William de Ferrers, who created the Borough in order to promote a prosperous community at the gates of his castle, where people had begun to settle in numbers and to trade in the ancient market.

Henry Chichele (c. 1364 – 12 April 1443) was born in Higham Ferrers. He was Archbishop of Canterbury and founded All Souls College, Oxford.

In 1422 Higham Ferrers School was founded.

The second Charter was granted in 1556 in the reign of Mary Tudor. For many years the town provided a safe seat in Parliament for a supporter of the Crown nominated by the Duchy of Lancaster, the biggest landowner. When James I came to the throne the town obtained a confirmation and further extension of civic powers and liberties by the Charter of 1604. Again after the Restoration of Charles II to the throne and the passing of the Corporations Act 1661 the liberties were confirmed and extended.

The town was a rotten borough and sent one MP to the unreformed House of Commons until it was stripped of its representation by the Reform Act 1832.

After the Municipal Corporations Act 1882, the modern Charter of Queen Victoria reorganised the composition of the Corporation on modern lines to conform to the pattern of local government laid down in that Act. This Charter is the only one of the town's charters written in English: the earlier charters were in Latin.

The castle is thought to have been built not long after the Norman Conquest in 1066. However towards the end of the 15th century the castle suffered years of neglect. It was finally demolished in 1523 and the stone removed to build Kimbolton Castle. A grass bank and a pond are all that remain of the defensive earthworks and moat. In the garden of the Green Dragon Inn, formerly within the area of the outer ward of the castle, are the remains of a rectangular dove-house.

== Transport and communication ==
Historically, the town was at the crossroads of the A45 east–west route from Northampton to Cambridge, and the A6 north–south road from London to Leicester. It was a busy junction as both were long-distance transport corridors. The A45 bypassed the town in the early 1990s with a dual-carriageway, the former route (through the narrow, but beautiful streets of Kimbolton) becoming the B645. As the A6 carried less traffic, a bypass around Higham Ferrers and Rushden came later, opening on 14 August 2003, with the old road through both towns becoming the A5028.

Higham Ferrers railway station was the terminus of a short (5.25 mile) railway branch line on the Midland Railway from Wellingborough. There was an intermediate station at Rushden. The station closed to passenger services in 1959 and closed completely in 1969 with the end of goods services. Today, the nearest operational railway station is at Wellingborough about four miles away, but there is no bus route connecting Higham Ferrers to Wellingborough station.

== Commerce and civic buildings ==
Higham Ferrers Farmer's Market is held on the last Saturday of each month, except in December when it is moved to the last available day before Christmas. Higham Ferrers Farmer's Market is a Certified Farmer's Market, and is part of the FARMA organisation.

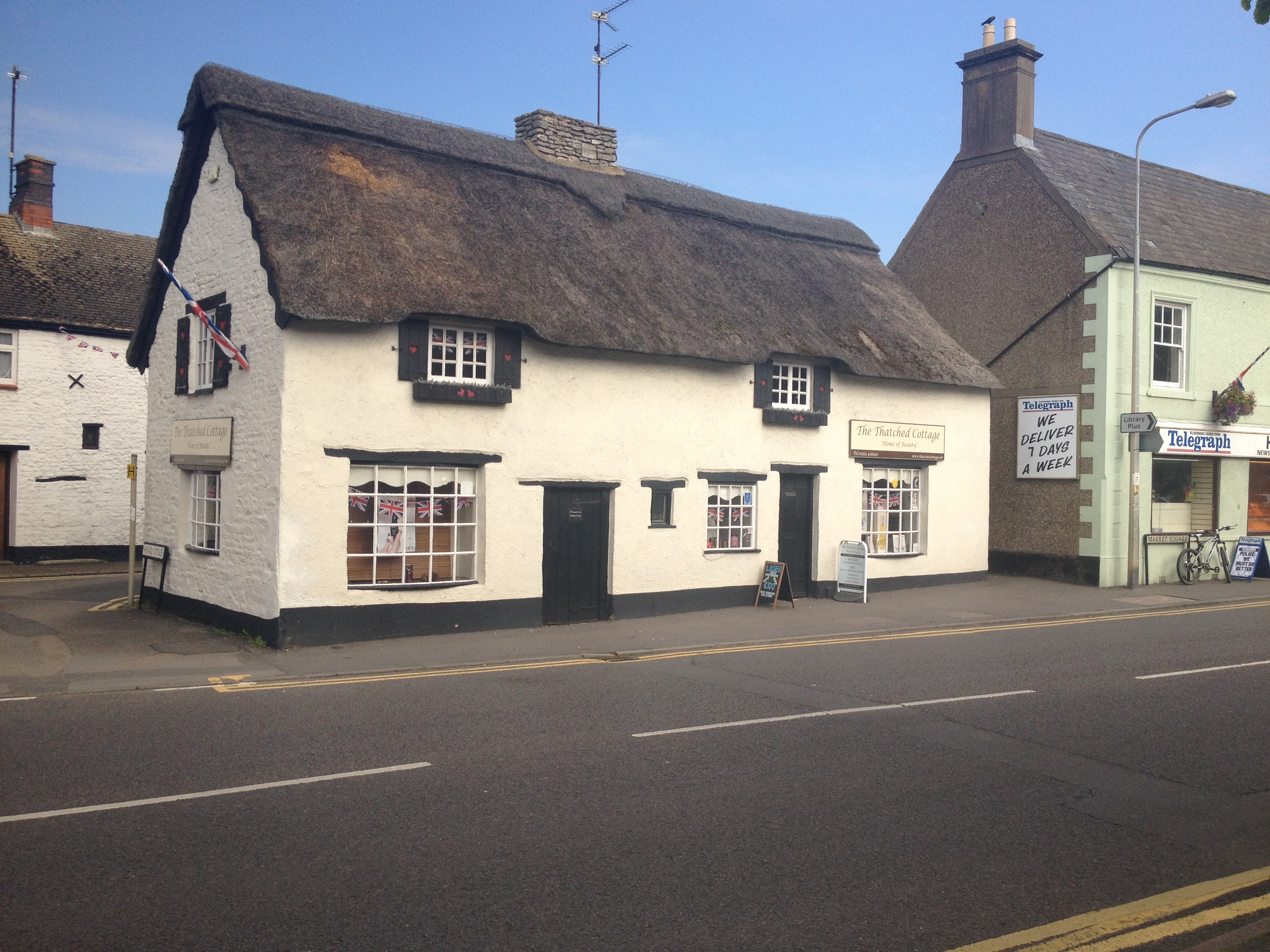
Higham Ferrers Thatched Cottage

Higham Ferrers Town Hall is on the Market Square and was completed in 1809.

== Sports ==
- Rushden & Higham RUFC was founded in 1951 and is currently based on the Bedford Road in Rushden with a 1st XV, 2nd XV, 3rd XV and Colts XV.
- Rushden and Higham United Football Club, the successor to both Higham Town and Rushden Rangers clubs, are members of the Spartan South Midlands Football League and have their ground at Hayden Road.
- Higham Ferrers Town Cricket Club, based at the recreation ground on Vinehill Drive, was established in 1881 and has a 1st XI and 2nd XI as well as an under 17s XI and under 15s XI.
- Higham Ferrers Town Bowls Club was founded in 1946 and is also at the recreation ground on Vinehill Drive.

== Education ==
- Alpha Pre-School on Westfield Terrace is a committee-run community school and has been running for over 40 years, providing part-time nursery places.
- Higham Ferrers Nursery and Infant School on Wharf Road has a Nursery unit with 52 part-time places for pre-school children and 3 classes of about 30 pupils per year group: Reception and Years 1 and 2 (roughly ages 3 to 7). This is a feeder infant school for Higham Ferrers Junior School.
- Higham Ferrers Junior School on the corner of Wharf Road and Saffron Road has classes for Years 3 to 6 (roughly ages 7 to 11), with 3 classes per year group and roughly 30 in each class.
- Henry Chichele Primary School is on the new estate to the north of the town on School Lane and has two classes per year for Reception, and Years 1 to 6 (roughly ages 4 to 11).
- The Ferrers School is on Queensway and caters for Years 7 to 13 (ages 11 to 18). Both Higham Ferrers Junior School and Henry Chichele Primary School are feeder schools.
- Moulton College can be found on the outskirts of Higham Ferrers

== Politics ==
The town council consists of 16 elected councillors and elects a mayor and deputy mayor at the annual meeting of the council in May of each year.

There is also a Higham Ferrers ward which returns two members to North Northamptonshire Council. At the 2025 election, one Reform UK councillor and one Conservative Party councillor were elected.

== Notable buildings ==
=== St Mary the Virgin ===
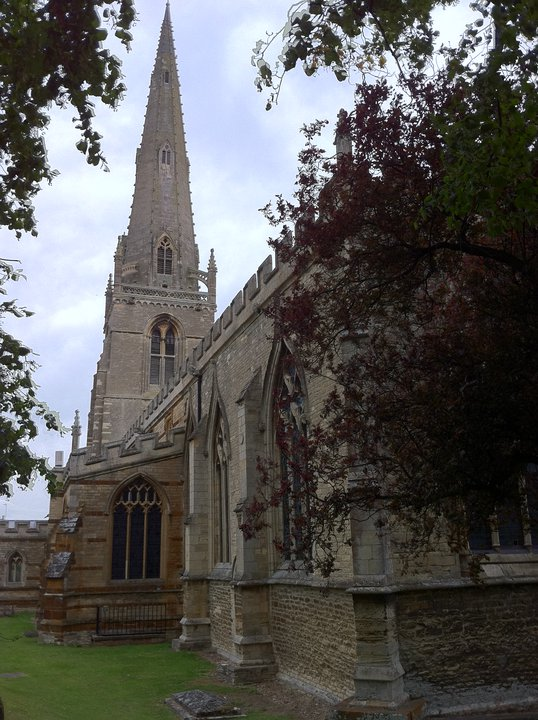
St Mary's Church

St Mary's is a Church of England parish church founded in the 13th century, and is a Grade I listed building.

=== Chichele College ===
Chichele College was founded by Henry Chichele, the Archbishop of Canterbury, in 1422 as a college for secular canons. The College had provision for 8 priests, 4 clerks, 6 choristers and a song and grammar master. In later times the college became an inn, and then later a farm. Parts of several buildings survive, including one hall now used for artistic exhibitions.

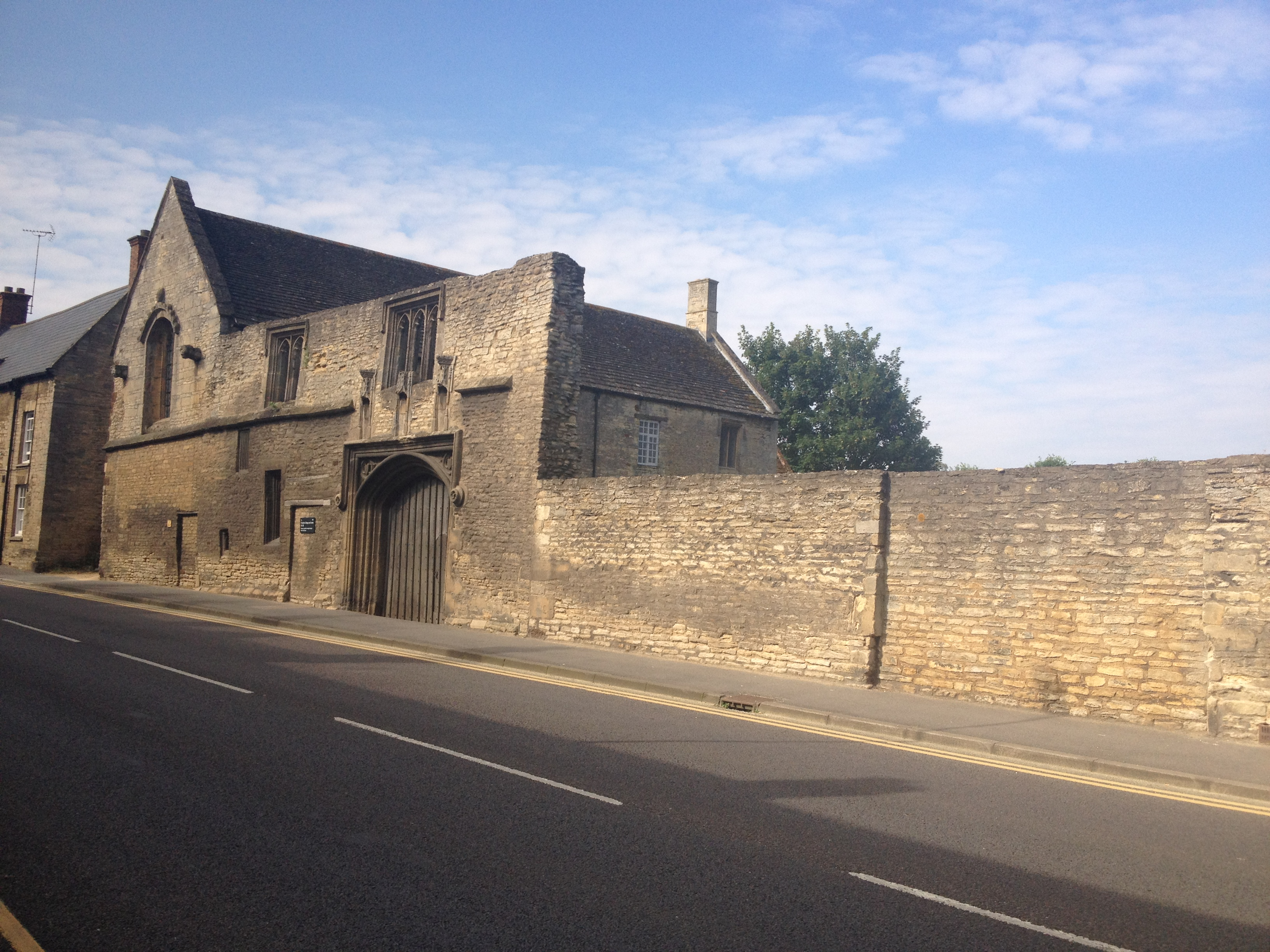
Chichele College

=== The Bede House ===
About the year 1422, when planning his college at Higham Ferrers, Archbishop Henry Chichele founded "In a place adjoining the Vicarage and the Churchyard", his Bede House or Hospital to be a dwelling place for 12 men over 50 years old to live "in close company", with one woman to look after them. It consisted of a common open Hall. Each man had his little cubicle with its locker, divided off by a screen from his fellows, and the rest of the Hall formed a common room with a fine open fireplace, itself a relic of even older times. On the South, a sheltered garden was added by taking part of the land of the Vicarage.

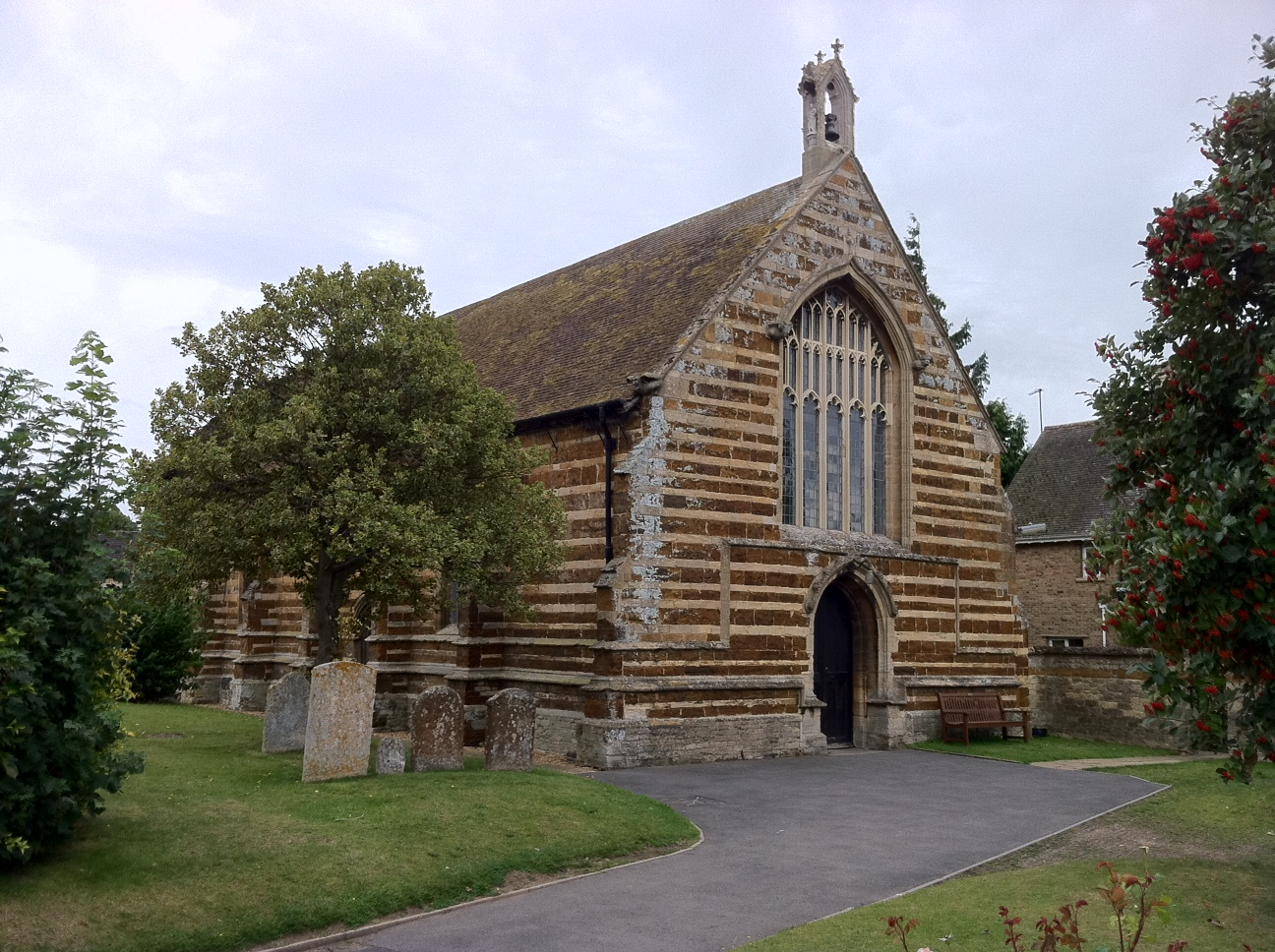
The Bede House

== Notable residents ==
- Henry Chichele (c. 1362–1443), Archbishop of Canterbury (1414–1443) and diplomat
- Donald Pack (1920–2016), professor, mathematician and expert on supersonic air waves, was born and raised here.
- Alice Maud Shipley (1869-1951), militant suffragette was born here.

== Freedom of the Town ==
The following people and military units have received the Freedom of the Town of Higham Ferrers.

=== Individuals ===
- Gwen Murdin: 21 March 2014.
- Derek Lawson: 18 February 2022.
- Richard Gell: 18 February 2022.
