= Montagu Douglas Scott =

Aristocratic family in the United Kingdom

- Scottish noble family
- Arms of Montagu Douglas Scott
- Parent family: House of Stuart
- Country: Kingdom of Scotland; Kingdom of England; United Kingdom
- Current head: Richard Scott, 10th Duke of Buccleuch
- Titles: Duke of Monmouth; Duke of Buccleuch; Duke of Queensberry; Marquess of Dumfriesshire; Earl of Buccleuch; Earl of Dalkeith; Earl of Doncaster; Earl of Drumlanrig and Sanquhar; Viscount of Nith, Tortholwald and Ross; Baron Montagu of Beaulieu; Baron Scott of Tindale
- Connected families: British royal family
- Motto: Amo (Love)
- Estates: Dalkeith Palace; Drumlanrig Castle; Bowhill House; Boughton House; Beaulieu Palace House

Montagu Douglas Scott is a prominent aristocratic family in the United Kingdom, founded by James Scott, 1st Duke of Monmouth, the eldest illegitimate son of King Charles II. He would lead the 1685 Monmouth Rebellion and married Anne Scott, 1st Duchess of Buccleuch, heiress of the Scott family. The family name was briefly Montagu-Scott before the 5th Duke adopted its current form. It's one of only a handful of families in the English-speaking world to have an unhyphenated triple-barrelled name.

The 7th Duke of Buccleuch had a daughter, Alice, who married Prince Henry, Duke of Gloucester (third son of King George V and uncle of Queen Elizabeth II) in 1935, becoming a member of the British Royal Family. Prince Richard, Duke of Gloucester and Prince William of Gloucester are grandsons of the 7th Duke of Buccleuch. Sarah Ferguson, former wife of Andrew Mountbatten-Windsor, is a great-great-granddaughter of the 6th Duke of Buccleuch.

== Dukes of Buccleuch ==
- Anne Scott, 1st Duchess of Buccleuch (1651-1732), wife of James FitzRoy, 1st Duke of Monmouth
- Francis Scott, 2nd Duke of Buccleuch (1695-1751)
- Henry Scott, 3rd Duke of Buccleuch (1746-1812)
- Charles William Henry Montagu-Scott, 4th Duke of Buccleuch & 6th Duke of Queensberry (1772-1819)
- Walter Montagu Douglas Scott, 5th Duke of Buccleuch (1806-1884)
- William Montagu Douglas Scott, 6th Duke of Buccleuch (1831-1914)
- John Montagu Douglas Scott, 7th Duke of Buccleuch (1864-1935)
- Walter Montagu Douglas Scott, 8th Duke of Buccleuch (1894-1973)
- John Scott, 9th Duke of Buccleuch (1923-2007)
- Richard Scott, 10th Duke of Buccleuch (1954-Current)

Other members of the Montagu Douglas Scott family:

- Francis Scott, Earl of Dalkeith (1721-1750)
- Princess Alice, Duchess of Gloucester (born Lady Alice Montagu Douglas Scott), daughter of the 7th Duke of Buccleuch, married in 1935 Prince Henry, Duke of Gloucester (third son of King George V and uncle of Elizabeth II), and had issue.
- Henry Douglas-Scott-Montagu, 1st Baron Montagu of Beaulieu (1832-1905)
- Lord Charles Montagu Douglas Scott (1839-1911), Royal Navy
- Lord William Montagu Douglas Scott (1896-1958), MP for Roxburgh and Selkirk (1935-1950)
- Lord Herbert Andrew Montagu Douglas Scott (1872–1944), who married Marie Josephine Edwards on 26 April 1905, and had issue, maternal great-grandfather of Sarah Ferguson.
- Louisa Jane Montagu Douglas Scott, 6th Duchess of Buccleuch (1836-1912)
- Mary Montagu Douglas Scott, 8th Duchess of Buccleuch, née Vreda Esther Mary Lascelles) (1900-1993)

== Coats of Arms ==
Ancestral Scott arms: Or on a bend azure a mullet of six points between two crescents of the field

Arms of the 1st Duke of Monmouth & Buccleuch

Arms of the 3rd Duke of Monmouth & Buccleuch

Arms of the 4th Duke of Buccleuch

Arms of the 5th Duke of Buccleuch

Arms of the 8th to 10th Duke of Buccleuch

Coat of arms of Arms of the Duke of Buccleuch
Adopted 1935 Coronet A coronet of a Duke Crest A Stag trippant proper armed and attired Or Escutcheon Quarterly: 1st grandquarter for the Earldom of Doncaster: the arms of King Charles II debruised by a Baton Sinister Argent; 2nd grandquarter for the Dukedom of Argyll: quarterly, 1st and 4th: Gyronny of eight Or and Sable (Campbell); 2nd and 3rd: Argent a Lymphad sails furled Sable flags and pennons flying Gules and oars in action of the second (Lorne); 3rd grandquarter for the Dukedom of Queensberry: quarterly, 1st and 4th: Argent a Heart Gules crowned with an Imperial Crown Or on a Chief Azure three Mullets of the field (Douglas); 2nd and 3rd, Azure a Bend between six Cross Crosslets fitchée Or (Mar); the whole of this grandquarter within a Bordure Or charged with a double Tressure flory-counter-flory Gules; 4th grandquarter for the Dukedom of Montagu: quarterly, 1st: Argent three Fusils conjoined in fess Gules a Bordure Sable (Montagu); 2nd: Or an Eagle displayed Vert beaked and membered Gules (Monthermer); 3rd: Sable a Lion rampant Argent on a Canton of the last a Cross Gules (Churchill); 4th: Argent a Chevron Gules between three Caps of Maintenance their fronts turned to the sinister Azure furred Ermine (Brudenell); over the grandquarters at the fess point an Inescutcheon Or on a Bend Azure a Mullet of six points between two Crescents of the field (Scott). Supporters On either side a Female Figure proper habited from the waist downwards in a Kirtle Azure gathered up at the knees the arms and bosom uncovered around the shoulders a Flowing Mantle as before suspended by the exterior hand girdle and sandals Gules and her head adorned with a Plume of three Ostrich Feathers Argent Motto Amo ("I Love")

== Family Tree ==
Montagu Douglas Scott Family Tree: Dukes of Buccleuch and Queensberry

LORD SCOTT of Buccleuch, 1606
Walter, 1st Lord Scott of Buccleuch (c. 1565–1611)
EARL OF BUCCLEUCH, 1619
Walter, 2nd Lord Scott of Buccleuch, 1st Earl of Buccleuch (c. 1606–1633)
Francis Scott, 2nd Earl of Buccleuch (1626–1651)	King Charles II (1630–r.1660–1685)
Dukes of Cleveland & Southampton	Duke of Northumberland	Dukes of Richmond & Lennox
Earl of Plymouth	Dukes of Grafton	Dukes of St Albans
DUKE OF MONMOUTH, 1663; DUKE OF BUCCLEUCH, 1663	DUCHESS OF BUCCLEUCH, 1663
Mary Scott, 3rd Countess of Buccleuch (1647–1661)	James Scott, 1st Duke of Monmouth, 1st Duke of Buccleuch (1649–1685) illegitimate Executed, Dukedom forfeit	Anne Scott, 1st Duchess of Buccleuch (1651–1732)
James Scott, Earl of Dalkeith (1674–1705)
Dukes of Queensberry
Francis Scott, 2nd Duke of Buccleuch (1695–1751); Succeeded to grandmother's Dukedom, 1732	Lady Jane Douglas (1701–1729)
Francis Scott, Earl of Dalkeith (1721–1750)
Henry Scott, 3rd Duke of Buccleuch, 5th Duke of Queensberry (1746–1812); Succeeded to Dukedom of Queensberry, 1810
George Scott, Earl of Dalkeith (1768)	Charles William Henry Montagu-Scott, 4th Duke of Buccleuch, 6th Duke of Queensberry (1772–1819)
George Henry Scott, Lord Scott of Whitchester (1798–1808)	Walter Francis M.D.Scott, 5th Duke of Buccleuch, 7th Duke of Queensberry (1806–1884)
William Henry Walter M.D.Scott, 6th Duke of Buccleuch, 8th Duke of Queensberry (1831–1914)	Henry Douglas-Scott-Montagu, 1st Baron Montagu of Beaulieu (1832–1905); Barons Montagu of Beaulieu
Walter Henry M.D.Scott, Earl of Dalkeith (1861–1886)	John Charles M.D.Scott, 7th Duke of Buccleuch, 9th Duke of Queensberry (1864–1935)
Walter John M.D.Scott, 8th Duke of Buccleuch, 10th Duke of Queensberry (1894–1973)
Walter Francis John M.D.Scott, 9th Duke of Buccleuch, 11th Duke of Queensberry (1923–2007)
Richard Walter John M.D.Scott, 10th Duke of Buccleuch, 12th Duke of Queensberry (b. 1954)
Walter John Francis M.D.Scott, Earl of Dalkeith (b. 1984)

== In media ==
- Nick Carraway, the narrator of F. Scott Fitzgerald's The Great Gatsby, says his family has "a tradition that we're descended from the Dukes of Buccleuch", but then points out that this is not true.

== See also ==
- Buccleuch, Scottish Borders
- Clan Douglas
- Clan Scott
- Clan Stewart, as they are descendants of the Duke of Monmouth; the eldest illegitimate son of King Charles II
- Duke of Buccleugh (ship) – several ships with that name
