= Earl of Deloraine =

Earl of Deloraine was a title in the Peerage of Scotland. It was created in 1706 for Lord Henry Scott, second surviving son of James Scott, Duke of Monmouth (illegitimate son of King Charles II by his mistress Lucy Walter) by Anne Scott, 1st Duchess of Buccleuch. He was made Lord Goldielands and Viscount of Hermitage at the same time, also in the Peerage of Scotland. Two of his sons, the second and third Earls, succeeded in the title. The titles became extinct on the death of the latter's son, the fourth Earl, in 1807.

The titles come from places in the Scottish Borders: Deloraine is where the Deloraine Burn joins the Ettrick Water, between Ettrick and Ettrickbridge; Hermitage Castle is north of Newcastleton; and Goldielands is a peel tower near where the Borthwick Water joins the River Teviot, to the southwest of Hawick.

== Earls of Deloraine (1706) ==
- Henry Scott, 1st Earl of Deloraine (1676–1730)
- Francis Scott, 2nd Earl of Deloraine (1710–1739)
- Henry Scott, 3rd Earl of Deloraine (1712–1740)
- Henry Scott, 4th Earl of Deloraine (1737–1807)

== Arms ==
Coat of arms of Earl of Deloraine
| Coronet A Coronet of an Earl Crest A Stag trippant proper armed and attired Or, a Crescent for difference Escutcheon Or on a Bend Azure a Mullet of six points between two Crescents of the field, a Crescent for difference Supporters On either side a Female Figure proper habited from the waist downwards in a Kirtle Azure gathered up at the knees the arms and bosom uncovered around the shoulders a Flowing Mantle as before suspended by the exterior hand girdle and sandals Gules and her head adorned with a Plume of three Ostrich Feathers Argent Motto Amo (I love) |

== See also ==
- Duke of Monmouth
- Duke of Buccleuch
