= Walter Scott, Earl of Tarras =

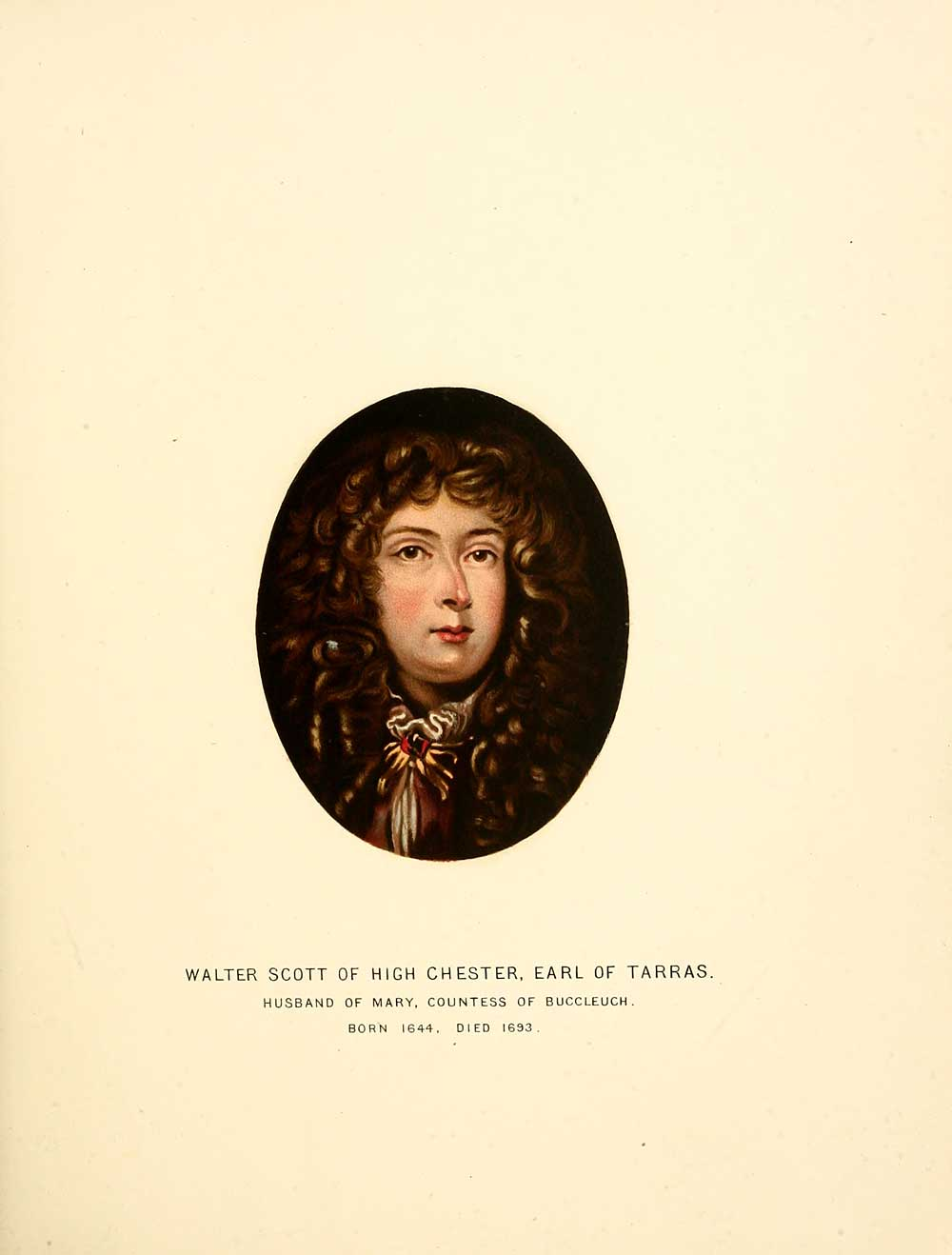
An illustration of Walter Scott from William Fraser's The Scotts of Buccleuch (1878)

Walter Scott, Earl of Tarras, Lord Almoor and Campcastill (23 December 1644 – 9 April 1693) was a Scottish nobleman.

== Early life ==
Born Walter Scott of Highchester, he married his kinswoman Mary Scott, 3rd Countess of Buccleuch, daughter of Francis Scott, 2nd Earl of Buccleuch and Lady Margaret Leslie, on 9 February 1659 in Wemyss, Fife. She died in 1661 and the couple had no children.

At the age of 14, on February 9, 1659, he married his distant relative, the eleven-year-old wealthy heiress Mary Scott, 3rd Countess of Buccleuch (1647–1661), in Wemyss, Fife. On September 4, 1660, the newly crowned King Charles II bestowed upon him the Scottish noble titles of Earl of Tarras and Lord Alemoor and Campcastell. He married Helen Hepburn of Humbie in 1677, and they had a number of children. He was granted the titles Earl of Tarras and Baron Almoor and Campcastill in the Peerage of Scotland in 1660. These were early examples of a life peerage, being granted "for the days of his natural life", to make Walter Scott of equal rank to his wife. In 1685 he was attainted, but restored in 1687.

He died on April 9, 1693, at the age of 48. With his death, his noble titles became extinct, and his lands passed to his eldest son, Gideon Scott (1678–1707). Through his younger son, Walter Scott (1682–1746), and the latter's son, Walter Scott (1724–1793), he is the great-grandfather of Hugh Hepburne-Scott, 6th Lord Polwarth (1758–1841).
