= Henry Scott, 1st Earl of Deloraine =

British Army officer and politician

The Right Honourable The Earl of Deloraine
- Mezzotint by William Faithorne after a John Closterman portrait
- Successor: Francis Scott, 2nd Earl of Deloraine (1710–1739)
- Born: 1676
- Died: 25 December 1730 (age 54); Ledwell, Oxfordshire
- Buried: Sandford St. Martin, Oxfordshire
- Spouses: Anne Duncombe (1683–1720); Mary Howard (1726–1730)
- Issue Detail: 5 children
- Father: James Scott, 1st Duke of Monmouth
- Mother: Anne Scott, 1st Duchess of Buccleuch

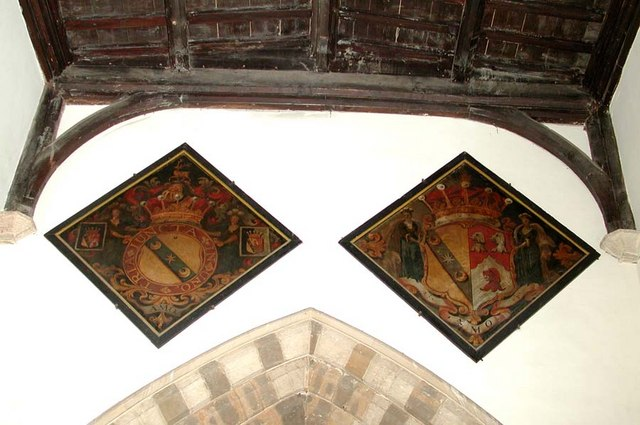
Funeral hatchments of Deloraine at Sandford St Martin

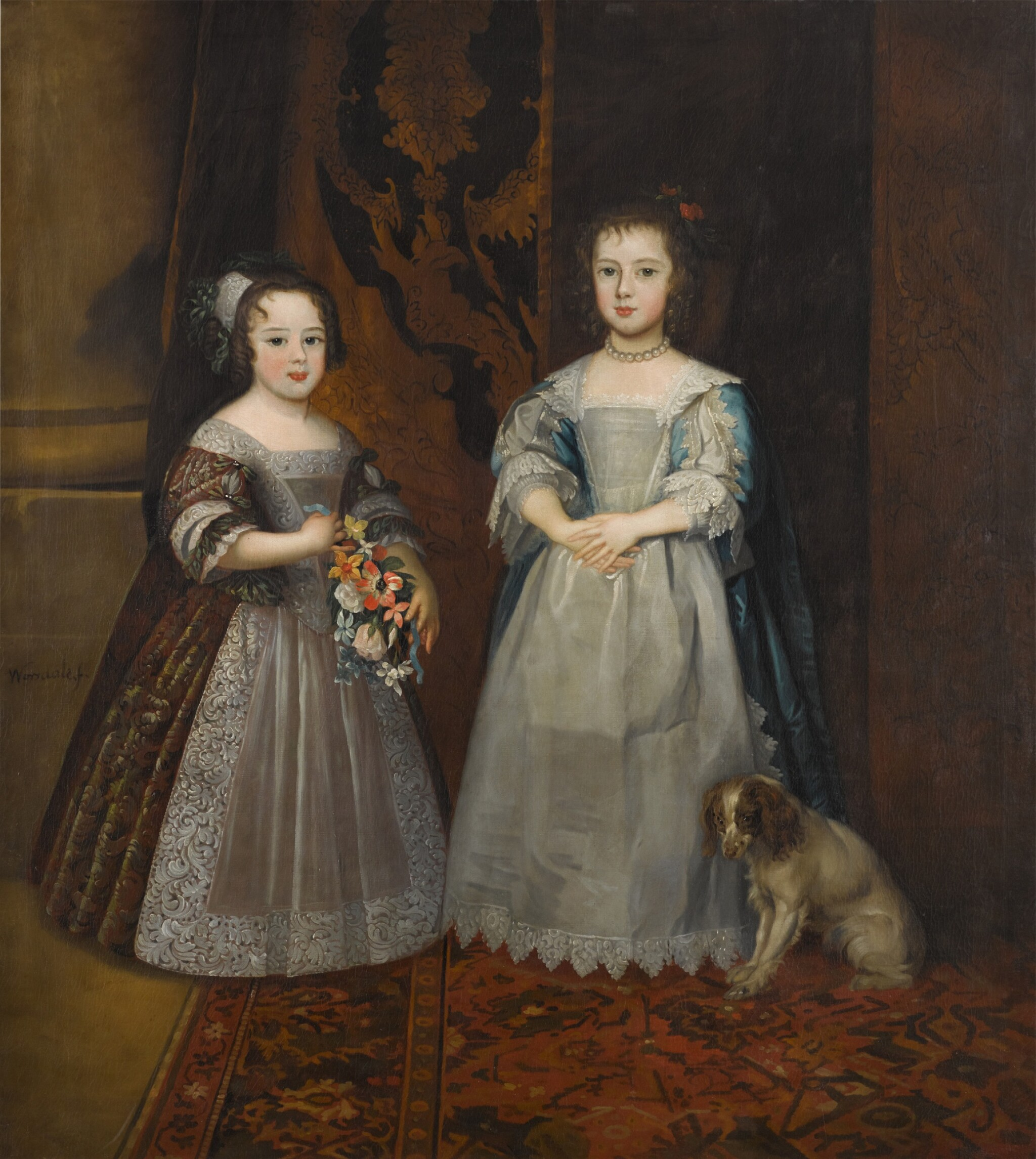
Portrait of Deloraine's two daughters Georgiana and Henrietta by James Worsdale, c. 1733

Major-General Henry Scott, 1st Earl of Deloraine, KB (1676 – 25 December 1730) was a British Army officer and politician.

== Life ==
Scott was the second surviving son of James Scott, 1st Duke of Monmouth (the illegitimate son of King Charles II by his mistress Lucy Walter) by his wife Anne Scott, 1st Duchess of Buccleuch, daughter of Francis Scott, 2nd Earl of Buccleuch. In 1693, he married Anne Duncombe (d. 1720), a daughter of William Duncombe of Batthesden, Lord Chief Justice of Ireland. They had three surviving children:

- Francis Scott, 2nd Earl of Deloraine (1710–39)
- Henry Scott, 3rd Earl of Deloraine (1712–40)
- Anne Scott

In 1706, Queen Anne created him Earl of Deloraine. He was elected to the last Scottish Parliament that year and voted in favour of the Acts of Union. In 1725 he was vested with the Order of the Bath. In 1727 he was appointed a Gentleman of the Bedchamber.

In 1726, Deloraine married Mary Howard, the granddaughter of Col. Philip Howard, and the great-granddaughter of Thomas Howard, 1st Earl of Berkshire, both of the Howard family, and they had two daughters:

- Lady Georgiana Caroline Scott (1727–1809), married James Peachey, 1st Baron Selsey. They were the parents of John Peachey, 2nd Baron Selsey.
- Lady Henrietta Scott (b. 1728–?), married Nicolas Boyce.

On 9 July 1730, Deloraine was commissioned as a colonel in the 6th Dragoon Guards, the King's Carabiners (c. 1691), and his coat of arms was recorded as follows: "ARMS. Or, on a bend Azure, a star between two crescents of the field. CREST. A stag trippant, proper. SUPPORTERS. Two maidens richly attired in antique habits, their under robe Vert, the middle one Azure, and the uppermost Gules, and each plumed on her head with feathers. MOTTO. 'Amo'."

Lord Deloraine died suddenly on Christmas Day in 1730 in Leadwell (now Ledwell), Oxfordshire, and is buried at St Martin’s Church, in the village of Sandford St Martin in Oxfordshire. His second wife, who had been a royal mistress of King George II, remarried, and she is buried at Windsor.

== Arms ==
Coat of arms of Henry Scott, 1st Earl of Deloraine
Coronet A Coronet of an Earl Crest A stag trippant, proper. Escutcheon Or, on a bend Azure, a star between two crescents of the field. Supporters Two maidens richly attired in antique habits, their under robe Vert, the middle one Azure, and the uppermost Gules, and each plumed on her head with feathers. Motto Amo ("love")

Military offices
Preceded by The Earl Marischal	Captain and Colonel of the 2nd Troop Horse Grenadier Guards; 1715–17	Succeeded by The Lord Forrester
Preceded by Col. John Cholmley (as John Cholmeley's; Regiment of Foot)	Colonel of The Earl of Deloraine's; Regiment of Foot; 1724–30	Succeeded by Lt-Gen Roger Handasyde (as Roger Handasyde's; Regiment of Foot)
Preceded by Lt-Gen George MacCartney	Colonel of the 7th Regiment of Horse; 1730	Succeeded by Sir Robert Rich, Bt
Peerage of Scotland
New creation	Earl of Deloraine; 1706–1730	Succeeded by Francis Scott
