= Deloraine =

Deloraine may refer to the following:

- Deloraine, Tasmania, a town in Australia
- Deloraine, Manitoba, a town in Canada
- Earl of Deloraine, a title in the peerage of Scotland
- Deloraine, a novel by William Godwin
- Deloraine, Czech pagan folk band
