= Francis Scott, 2nd Duke of Buccleuch =

Scottish nobleman

His Grace The Duke of Buccleuch KT FRS
- Portrait by Allan Ramsay

Personal details
- Born: Francis Scott; 11 January 1695 Dalkeith Palace, Midlothian, Scotland
- Died: 22 April 1751 (aged 56) Eton, Buckinghamshire, England
- Spouse(s): Lady Jane Douglas (m. 1720; died 1729) Alice Powell (m. 1744)
- Children: Francis Scott, Earl of Dalkeith
- Parent(s): James Scott, Earl of Dalkeith; Lady Henrietta Hyde

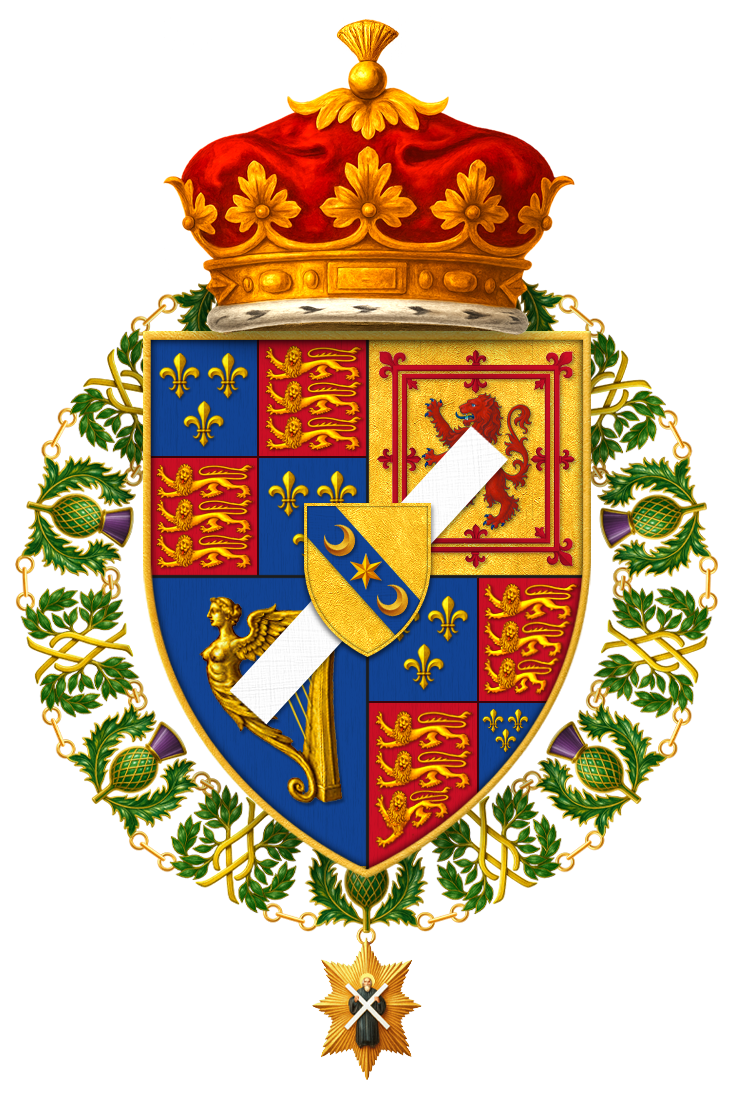
Shield of arms of Francis Scott, 2nd Duke of Buccleuch, KT, surmounting the collar of the Order of the Thistle

Francis Scott, 2nd Duke of Buccleuch, KT, FRS (11 January 1695 – 22 April 1751) was a Scottish nobleman.

== Family background ==
Buccleuch was the son of Sir James Scott, Earl of Dalkeith (son of James Scott, 1st Duke of Monmouth and Anne Scott, 1st Duchess of Buccleuch) and Lady Henrietta Hyde, daughter of Laurence Hyde, 1st Earl of Rochester. Through his father, Charles II of England was his great-grandfather. Scott was baptised on 20 January 1695 in St. James's Church, Westminster.

Following the death of his father in 1705, he was styled the Earl of Dalkeith, until he succeeded to the dukedom of Buccleuch, 6 February 1732, on the death of his grandmother, who was Duchess of Buccleuch in her own right. At the same time, other titles in the Scottish peerage came his way: Earl of Dalkeith and Baron Scott of Whitchester and Eskdale.

His grandfather, the Duke of Monmouth, was the illegitimate son of Charles II who raised a rebellion upon James II and VII's accession to the English, Scottish and Irish thrones, and was beheaded for it. Monmouth's noble titles were consequently forfeit, but in March 1743 two of those titles were restored to his progeny when the House of Lords passed a bill making Buccleuch the 2nd Earl of Doncaster, as well as 2nd Baron Scott of Tindall, both in the English peerage (conferred 22 March 1743).

== Career ==
In his youth, he attended Eton College. Throughout his adult life, Buccleuch associated himself with institutions that promoted learning. He was a Freemason, a member of the Grand Lodge at a period when scientific interests figured prominently in its pursuits. From 24 June 1723 to 24 June 1724 he held the office of Grand Master of Freemasons. He was invested as a Fellow of the Royal Society (FRS) on 12 March 1724. He was closely associated with the Spalding Gentlemen's Society, a learned society of antiquaries, and he was the first to hold its office of Patron, inaugurated in 1734. On 18 April 1745 he was awarded the honorary degree of Doctor of Civil Law by the University of Oxford.

His interest at the court of George I was sufficient for him to be invested as a Knight of the Thistle on 2 February 1725. In 1734 he entered the House of Lords when he was elected a Scottish representative peer. In 1740 and 1741, however, he signed protests produced by the opposition, including the November 1741 protest calling for the removal of Sir Robert Walpole from office. It is no surprise that Buccleuch in turn lost the support of the administration at the Scottish peers' election of 1741 and consequently failed to be re-elected. He would, nonetheless, return to the House of Lords when he became Earl of Doncaster in 1743.

== Personal life ==
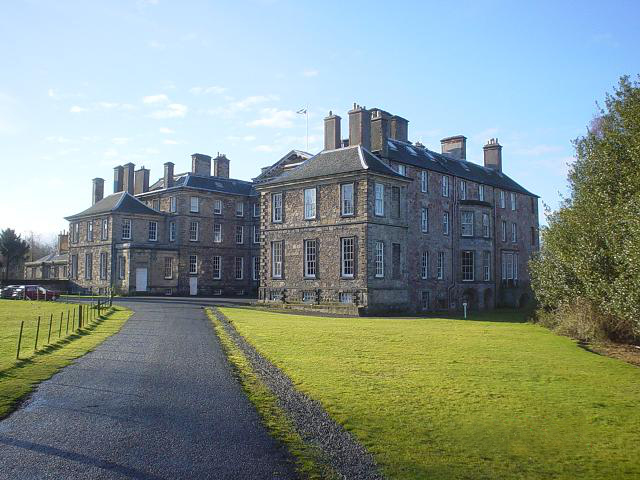
Dalkeith Palace

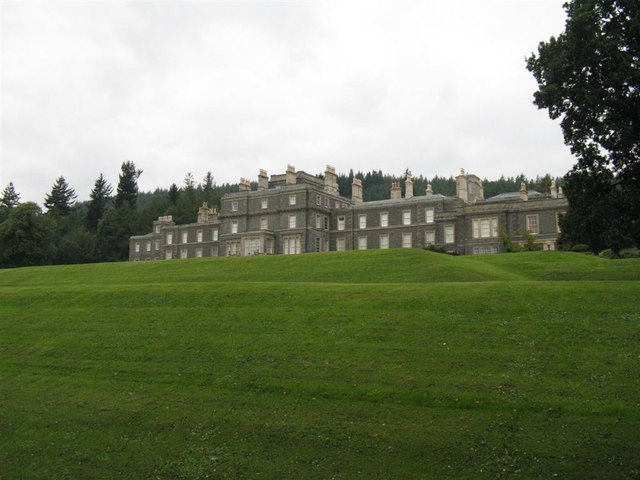
Bowhill House

Buccleuch married, firstly, Lady Jane Douglas, daughter of James Douglas, 2nd Duke of Queensberry, and Mary Boyle, on 5 April 1720 in Earl of Rochester's House, Privy Gardens, Whitehall. They had two sons (Francis and Charles) and three daughters. Through his daughter Jannett, Scott was the great-grandfather of Hugh and Edward Thomson. Lady Jane died in 1729 and is buried at Dalkeith Castle. He married, secondly, Alice Powell, daughter of Joseph Powell, on 4 September 1744 in St. George's Chapel, Mayfair, London, England. Both his sons predeceased him, so he was succeeded by his grandson Henry Scott, 3rd Duke of Buccleuch, the son of Francis. According to his will, he had six other children by Sarah Atkinson. He also appears to have had a son and three daughters by Elizabeth Jenkins.

He possessed several estates, some in Scotland and others in England. These included, in Scotland, Dalkeith Palace and Bowhill House (which he bought for his son Charles in 1747), and in England, Spalding in Lincolnshire, Langley in Berkshire and Hall Place at Hurley.

Buccleuch was buried on 26 April 1751 in Eton College Chapel.

== Ancestry ==
Ancestors of Francis Scott, 2nd Duke of Buccleuch

8. Charles II of England
4. James Scott, 1st Duke of Monmouth
9. Lucy Walter
2. James Scott, Earl of Dalkeith
10. Francis Scott, 2nd Earl of Buccleuch
5. Anne Scott, 1st Duchess of Buccleuch
11. Lady Margaret Leslie
1. Francis Scott, 2nd Duke of Buccleuch
12. Edward Hyde, 1st Earl of Clarendon
6. Laurence Hyde, 1st Earl of Rochester
13. Frances Aylesbury
3. Lady Henrietta Hyde
14. Richard Boyle, 1st Earl of Burlington
7. Lady Henrietta Boyle
15. Lady Elizabeth Clifford

Masonic offices
Preceded by The Duke of Wharton	Grand Master of the Premier; Grand Lodge of England; 1723–1724	Succeeded by The Duke of Richmond and Lennox
Peerage of Scotland
Preceded by Anne Scott	Duke of Buccleuch; 2nd creation 1732–1751; Member of the House of Lords (1734–1741)	Succeeded by Henry Scott
Peerage of England
Vacant Forfeit Title last held by James Scott	Earl of Doncaster; 1742/1743–1751	Succeeded by Henry Scott
