= Mary Scott, 3rd Countess of Buccleuch =

The Right Honourable The Countess of Buccleuch
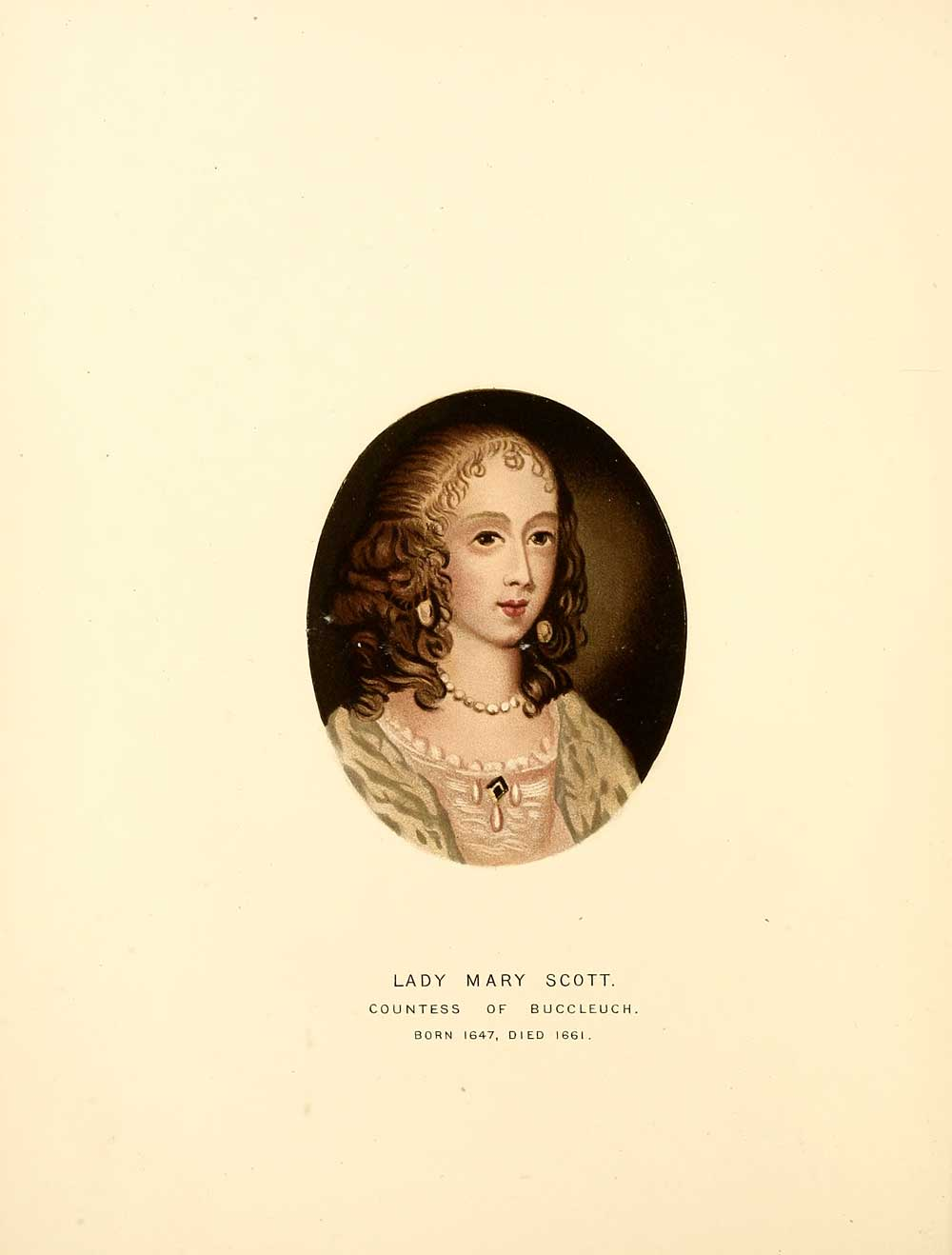
- An illustration of Mary from William Fraser's The Scotts of Buccleuch (1878)

Countess of Buccleuch
- Coat of arms
- Tenure: 22 November 1651 – 11 March 1661
- Predecessor: Francis Scott
- Successor: Anne Scott
- Born: 31 August 1647
- Died: 11 March 1661 (aged 13)
- Spouse: Walter Scott, Earl of Tarras
- Father: Francis Scott, 2nd Earl of Buccleuch
- Mother: Lady Margaret Leslie

Mary Scott, 3rd Countess of Buccleuch and Countess of Tarras (31 August 1647 – 11 March 1661) was a young Scottish peer. Mary was born at Dalkeith Castle, Midlothian, to Francis Scott, 2nd Earl of Buccleuch and his wife, Lady Margaret Leslie, daughter of John Leslie, 6th Earl of Rothes. In 1651, her father died, making four-year-old Mary, who was the Earl's eldest daughter, the suo jure countess of Buccleuch. She immediately became one of the most desirable matches in the kingdom. On 9 February 1659, aged only eleven years old, she married Walter Scott of Highchester, who was at that time fourteen. He was created Earl of Tarras a year later. Her mother arranged the marriage without proclamation, with a warrant from the presbytery of Kirkcaldy. It created a lot of disapproval and the court ruled that the couple should be separated until Mary reached the age of twelve. During their separation, they continued a very affectionate correspondence. However, she fell ill and died two years after their reunion, aged thirteen, in 1661, and her titles passed to her sister, Anne.

Peerage of Scotland
Preceded by Francis Scott	Countess of Buccleuch; 1651–1661	Succeeded by Anne Scott
