= Mary Scott, Countess of Deloraine =

British courtier and royal governess (1703–1744)

Mary Scott
- Born: Mary Howard
- Died: 12 November 1744
- Title: Countess of Deloraine
- Spouses: Henry Scott, 1st Earl of Deloraine (m. 1726; died 1730) William Windham (m. 1734; died 1744)
- Children: Georgiana Peachey, Baroness Selsey; Lady Elizabeth Boyce
- Parents: Charles Howard; Elizabeth Batten

Mary Scott, Countess of Deloraine (née Howard, later Windham; bap. 28 February 1703 – 12 November 1744), was a British courtier and royal governess. A member of the Howard family, her tenure at court began with an appointment as a maid of honour to the future Queen Caroline; she later served as governess to Caroline's daughters Mary and Louise. In 1737, she became a royal mistress of the widowed King George II. Her role ended in 1742 after Mary, possibly drunk, knocked him out of a chair during a party.

== Early life and family ==
Mary Howard was the only daughter of the naval officer Charles Howard, himself a younger son of Colonel Philip Howard and grandson of the 1st Earl of Berkshire. Her mother was Elizabeth Batten, a daughter of Edward Batten. Young Mary was baptised on 28 February 1703 at Winchester Cathedral, Hampshire. She had an older brother named Philip.

== Courtier ==
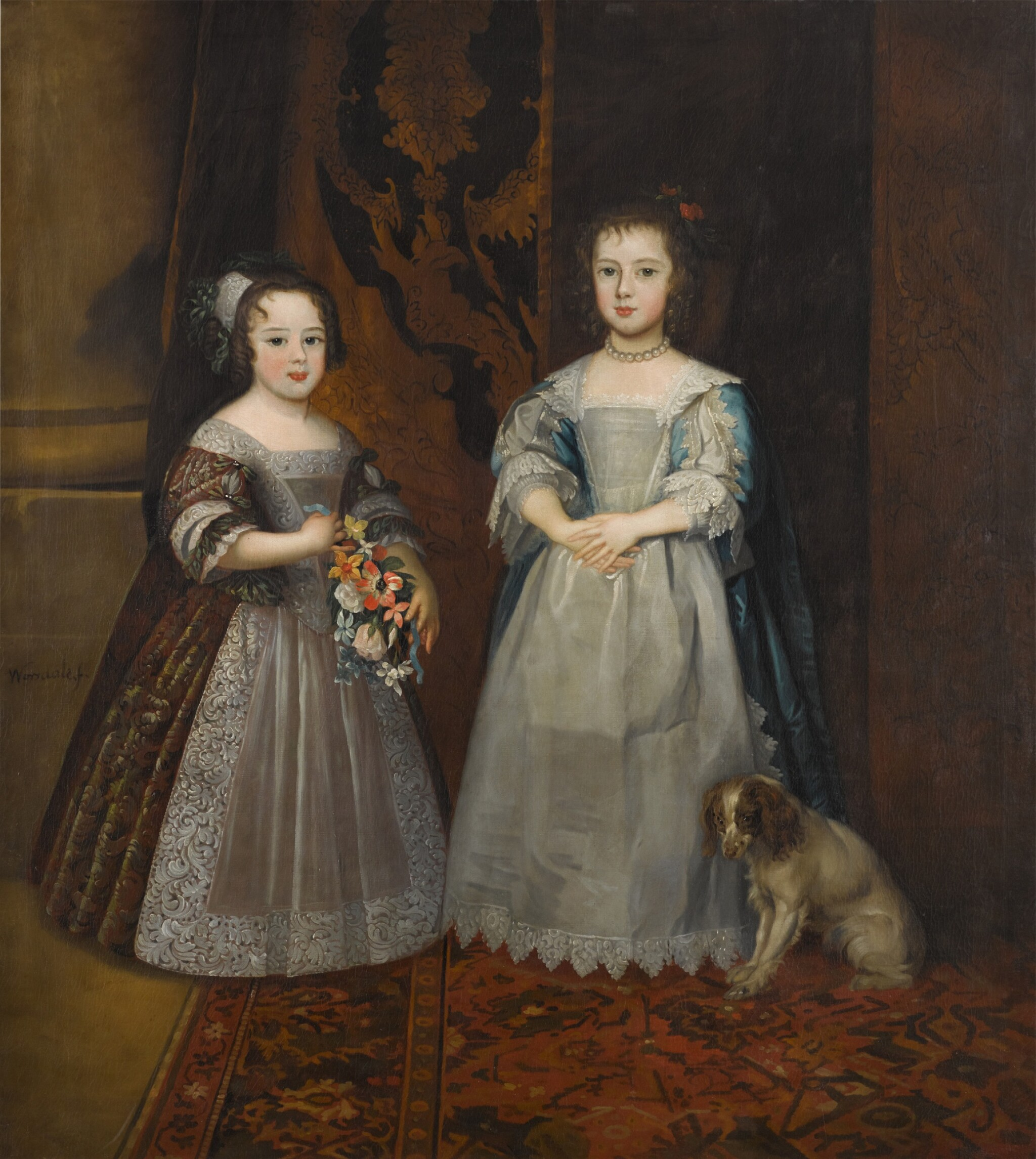
Portrait of Mary's two daughters (from James Worsdale, c. 1733)

Between at least 1723 and 1726, Mary Howard was a maid of honour to Caroline, Princess of Wales. She was forced to resign the position when she wed Henry Scott, 1st Earl of Deloraine, an army officer and lord of the bedchamber to George, Prince of Wales. They married on 14 March 1726 and had two daughters:

- Lady Georgiana Caroline Scott (bap. 1727–1809), married James Peachey, 1st Baron Selsey.
- Lady Elizabeth Henrietta Scott (bap. 1729), married Nicolas Boyce.

A younger son of James Scott, 1st Duke of Monmouth (himself an illegitimate child of Charles II), Deloraine had been raised to his earldom in 1706. He was a widower twenty-seven years older than his wife and already had three children. He remained in the prince's service after their marriage and they lived in his home at Leicester Fields, London. A member of the Scottish Parliament, Deloraine had also held various ranks in the British Army, and in July 1730, was promoted to major general. Four years into their union, he suffered "a fit of an apoplexy" and died on 25 December 1730. Mary was pregnant with their third child – a son – but suffered a miscarriage while at court.

After Deloraine's death, Mary was appointed governess to Princess Mary and Princess Louise, the two youngest daughters of George and Caroline – now king and queen. Mary appears alongside her charges in a painting by William Hogarth, A Performance of ‘The Indian Emperor, or, The Conquest of Mexico by the Spaniards', which depicts them attending a play. Mary can be seen in the forefront leaning toward one of the princesses, gesturing for them to retrieve a fallen fan. The sisters detested her and would later work to harm her reputation at court.

As a royal governess, Mary was not permitted to remarry. However, she persuaded Queen Caroline and the elder princesses. The queen reluctantly granted her permission in 1734 to wed another court official, William Windham of Earsham, Norfolk, who was a tutor for her younger son Prince William, Duke of Cumberland. They had a son, who predeceased them. Those around Mary continued to refer to her as Lady Deloraine, her higher title.

Mary was the subject of court gossip and was often mentioned in contemporary newspapers. The courtier Lord Hervey described her, now aged thirty-five, as having "one of the prettiest faces that ever was formed... that not one woman in ten thousand has at fifteen" but added that she "had something remarkably awkward about her arms which were long and bony, with a pair of ugly white hands at the end of them". The historian Lucy Worsley notes that Mary dealt with an alcohol addiction and was not a popular figure at court. The king was heard to complain that she "stank of Spanish wine" and courtiers shared that she "really works miracles in idiocy". Lord Hervey was a particular enemy of hers and, like others, referred to her as "La Mouche" or "The Fly". Mary was known to be cruel to her subordinates and court rivals; in one incident, she pulled off the headdress of a Miss MacKenzie – a dresser to Princess Louise with a reputation for beauty – and declared "Look at her, do you see how bald she is?".

== Royal mistress ==
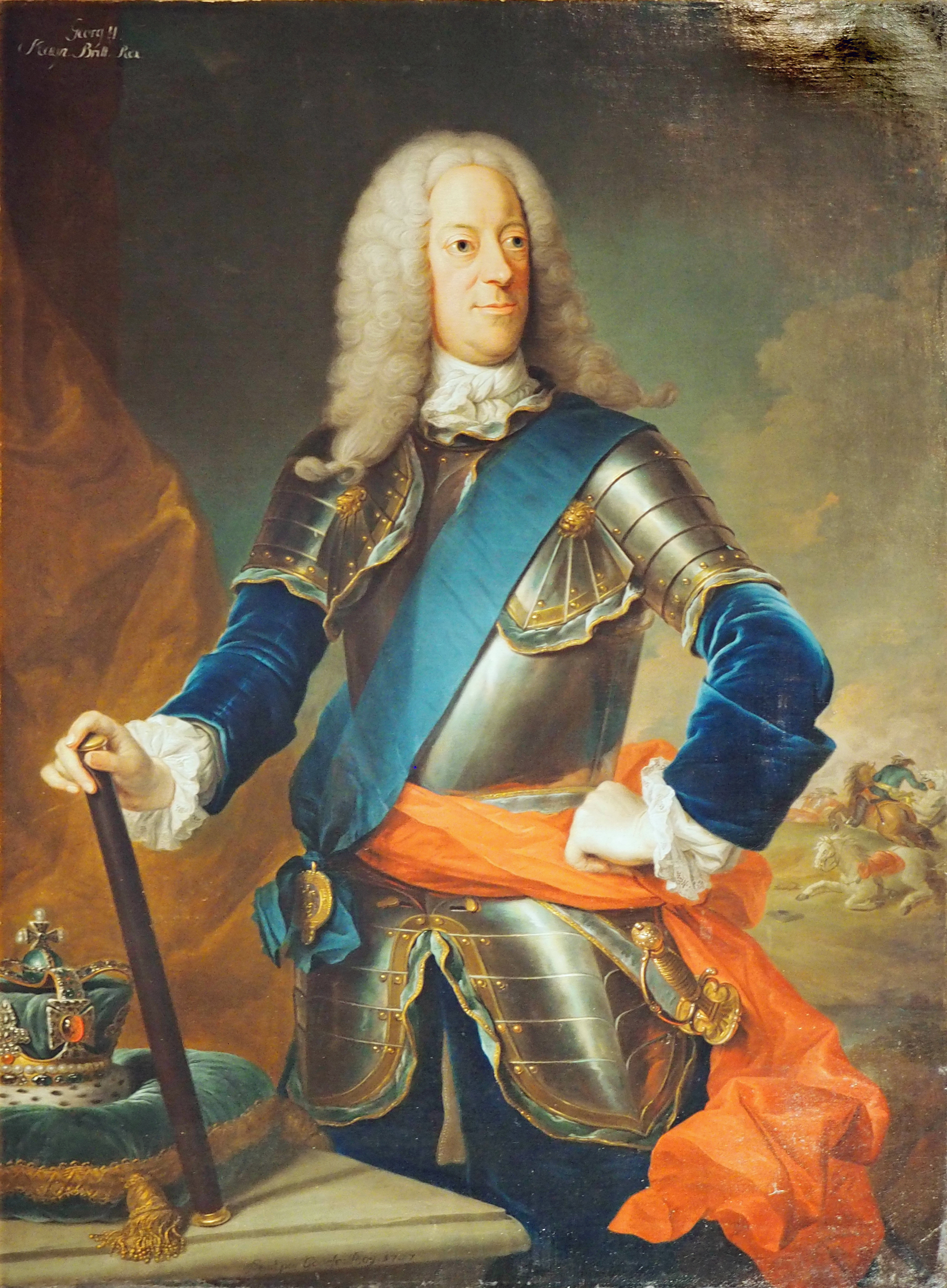
King George II (from Gottfried Boy, c. 1747)

In the summer after Queen Caroline's death in 1737, the widowed king took Mary as a mistress. He had often encountered her while visiting his daughters in their apartments. Mary claims that she resisted his advances but eventually agreed, joking to Sir Robert Walpole that her next child might not be fathered by her husband. Walpole was displeased by their relationship, writing that while he "was not sorry the King had got a new plaything," he "wished His Majesty had taken somebody that was less mischievous than that lying bitch". To end the relationship, the princesses Mary and Louise tried to distract their father by bringing other women around him. Walpole recommended that they drop their efforts, "as people must wear old gloves till they could get new ones".

In October 1742, Mary's role came to an end in sudden fashion. Whilst playing card games at a party attended by the king, someone moved her chair while she was sitting down, causing her to fall to the ground. The king's subsequent amusement angered her and she retaliated by also moving his chair. His fall was made painful due to his hemorrhoids and her position as royal mistress was finished. She may have been drunk during the incident. Afterwards, her role was supplanted by the German courtier Amalie von Wallmoden, Countess of Yarmouth, whom he had met in Hanover. Mary was reported to have fallen "dangerously ill" and her doctors recommended that she move to Twickenham to recover.

Two years after the affair ended with the king, Mary died on 12 November 1744. In her will, she bequeathed £8000 in bank stocks to her daughters from her first marriage. Lucy Worsley observes that Mary's "entire court career had been defined by her marriages and her role as mistress," but she lacked the ability to maintain social success. Another historian, Fabian Persson, in comparing Amalie and Mary, writes that the difference was "between a long-term relationship and a fling". Anne Somerset describes the king's time with Mary as "little more than a diversion", in contrast with his other relationships.
