= Francis Scott, Earl of Dalkeith =

Scottish nobleman

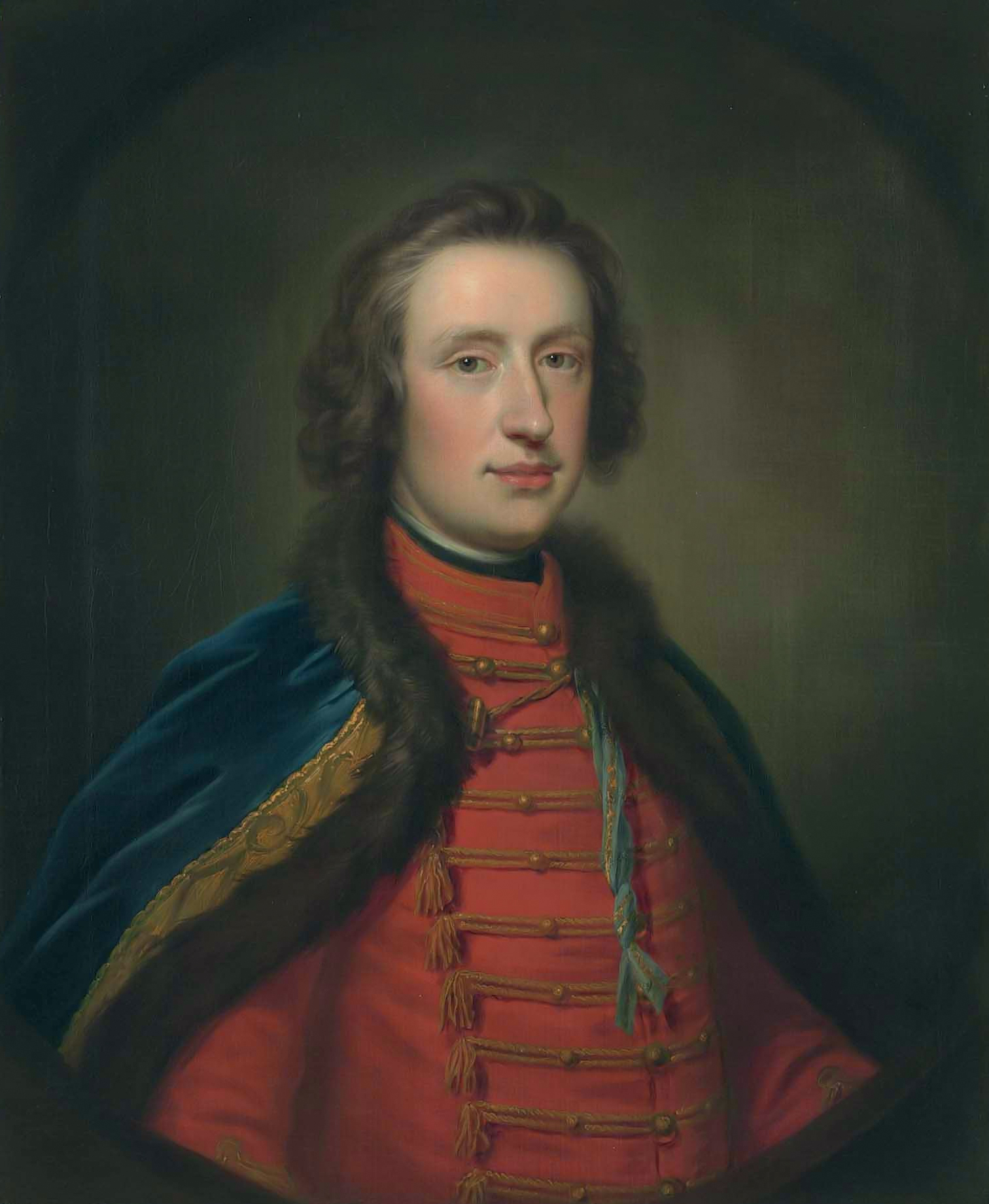
Francis Scott, Earl of Dalkeith (Thomas Bardwell, 1747)

Francis Scott, Earl of Dalkeith (19 February 1721 – 1 April 1750) was a Scottish nobleman.

He was the eldest child of Francis Scott, 2nd Duke of Buccleuch by his first wife Jane, daughter of James Douglas, 2nd Duke of Queensberry. Through his father he was a direct male-line descendant of King Charles II of England through his illegitimate son. In 1732 his father succeeded as second Duke of Buccleuch and Francis assumed the courtesy title Earl of Dalkeith. He was educated at Christ Church, Oxford, and was awarded the degree of Master of Arts on 26 January 1741.

On 2 October 1742 he was married to Lady Caroline Campbell (born 17 November 1717), eldest daughter and co-heiress of John Campbell, 2nd Duke of Argyll and 1st Duke of Greenwich. They had four sons and two daughters:

- Caroline Scott (1 October 1743 – 10 December 1753)
- John Scott, styled Lord Scott of Whitchester (3 January 1745 – January 1749)
- Henry Scott (2 September 1746 – 11 January 1812), styled Lord Scott of Whitchester after his brother's death, Earl of Dalkeith after his father's death and succeeded as 3rd Duke of Buccleuch in 1751; had issue
- Campbell Scott (17 October 1747 – 18 October 1766)
- James Scott (1 March 1748 – 17 January 1758)
- Frances Scott (26 July 1750 – 31 March 1817), second wife of Archibald Douglas, 1st Baron Douglas; had issue

Lord Dalkeith was elected to Parliament as Whig Member of Parliament for Boroughbridge in a by-election on 22 April 1746. On 1 April 1750 he died of smallpox aged 29, and was buried in the Buccleuch crypt at St Nicholas Church in Dalkeith.

In 1755 his widow was remarried to Charles Townshend, later Chancellor of the Exchequer, by whom she had further issue. She was created Baroness Greenwich in her own right in 1767, and died on 11 January 1794. Her title had been limited to her descendants from her second marriage, and became extinct on her death.

Parliament of Great Britain
Preceded by William Murray; George Gregory	Member of Parliament for Boroughbridge; 1746–1750; With: William Murray	Succeeded by William Murray; Hon. Lewis Watson
