= James Scott, Earl of Dalkeith =

Scottish nobleman and politician (1674–1705)

James Scott
- Earl of Dalkeith
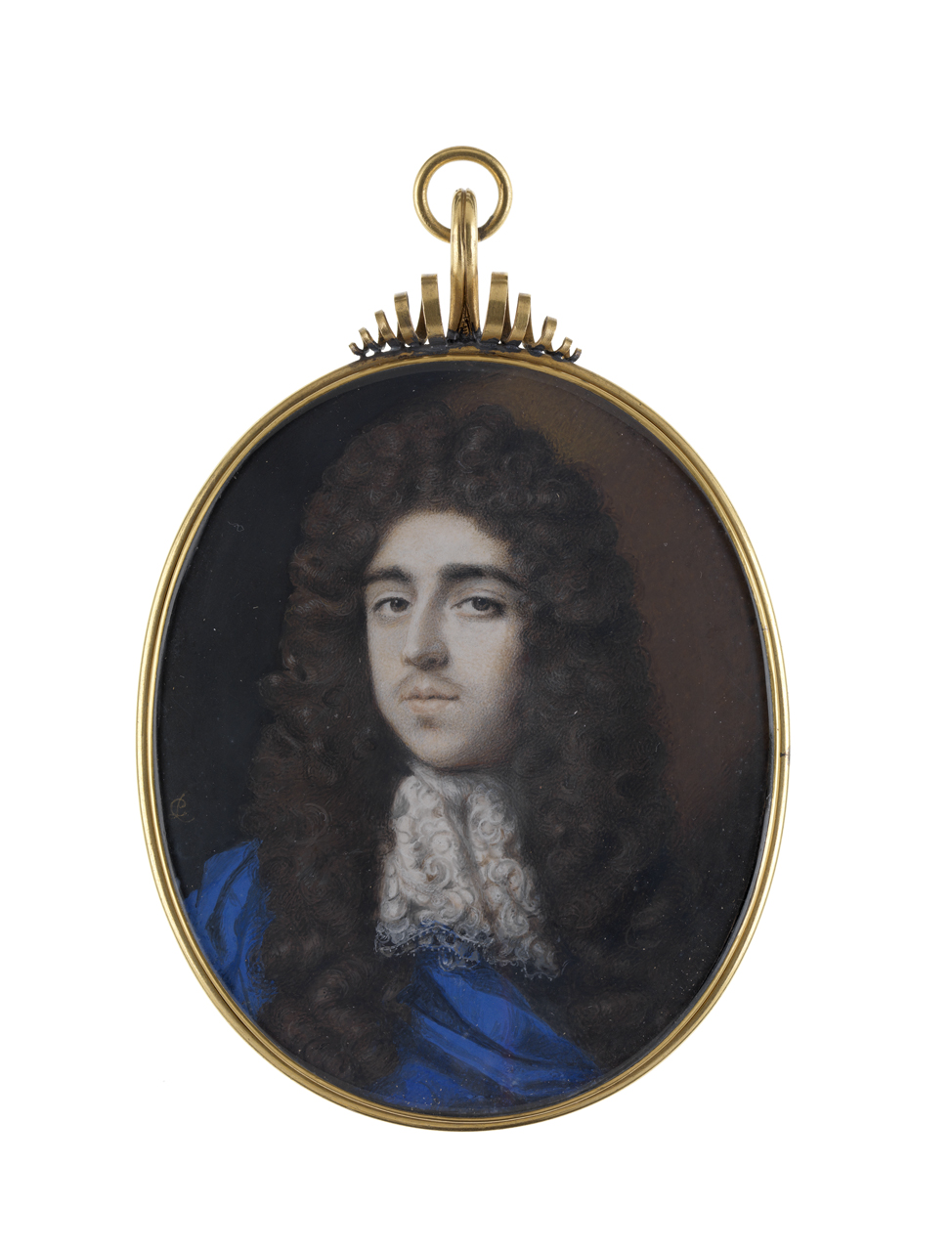
- Predecessor: James Scott, 1st Duke of Monmouth
- Successor: Francis Scott, 2nd Duke of Buccleuch
- Born: 23 May 1674
- Died: 14 March 1705 (aged 30)
- Buried: Westminster Abbey
- Spouse: Lady Henrietta Hyde
- Issue: 6 children, including Francis Scott, 2nd Duke of Buccleuch
- Father: James Scott, 1st Duke of Monmouth
- Mother: Anne Scott, 1st Duchess of Buccleuch

James Scott, Earl of Dalkeith, KT (23 May 1674 – 14 March 1705) was a Scottish nobleman and politician. He was the son of James Scott, 1st Duke of Monmouth, and Anne Scott, 1st Duchess of Buccleuch. He was also the grandson of King Charles II of England, Scotland and Ireland. On 2 January 1693/94 he married Lady Henrietta Hyde (born in Hindon, Wiltshire, c. 1677, died 30 May 1730), daughter of Laurence Hyde, 1st Earl of Rochester, and Henrietta Hyde, Countess of Rochester.

== Children ==
They had six children:

1. Francis Scott, 2nd Duke of Buccleuch (11 January 1695 – 22 May 1751) married (1) Lady Jane Douglas, daughter of James Douglas, 2nd Duke of Queensberry and Mary Boyle; (2) Alice Powell, daughter of Joseph Powell
2. Lady Anne Scott (1 April 1696 – 11 October 1714)
3. Lady Charlotte Scott (30 April 1697 – 22 August 1747)
4. The Hon. Charles Scott (March 1700 – 4 April 1700)
5. The Hon. James Scott (14 January 1702 – 26 February 1719)
6. The Hon. Henry Scott (26 November 1704 – died young)

== Death and burial ==
Lord Dalkeith died of apoplexy and was buried 19 March 1704/05 in the Henry VII Chapel of Westminster Abbey.
