= Anne Scott, 1st Duchess of Buccleuch =

Scottish peeress

Her Grace The Duchess of Buccleuch
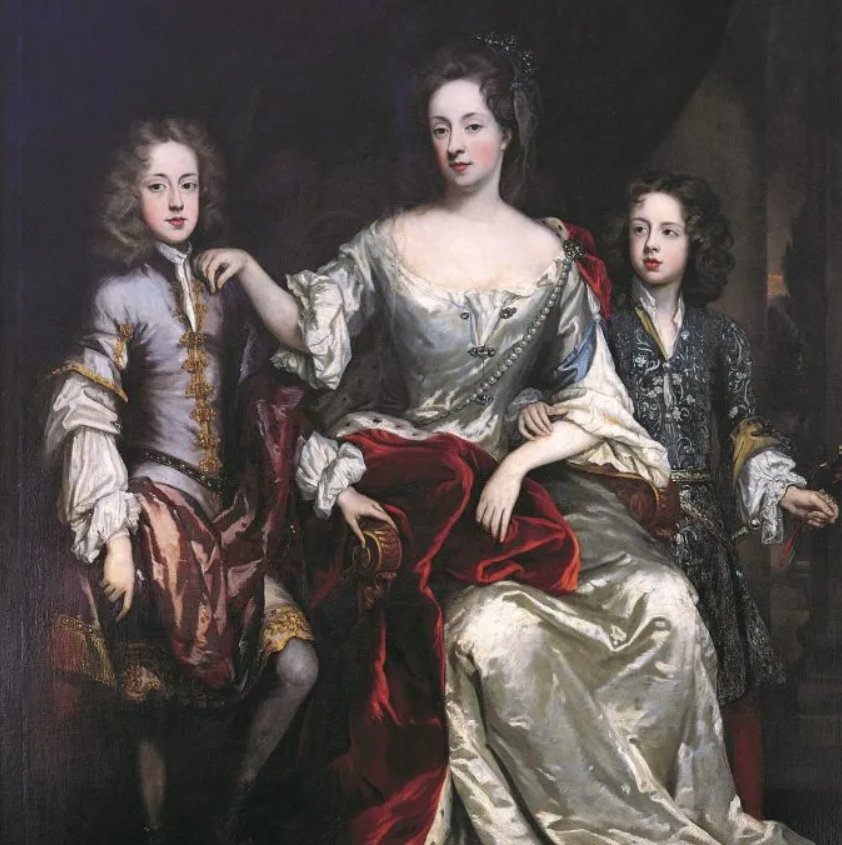
- Anna, Duchess of Buccleuch and her two surviving sons
- Born: Anna Scott; 11 February 1651; Dundee, Kingdom of Scotland
- Died: 6 February 1732 (aged 80)
- Spouses: James Scott, Duke of Monmouth (m. 1663; died 1685) Charles Cornwallis, 3rd Baron Cornwallis (after 1688)
- Issue: 9, including James, Henry
- Father: Francis Scott, 2nd Earl of Buccleuch
- Mother: Margaret Leslie

Anna Scott, 1st Duchess of Buccleuch (11 February 1651 – 6 February 1732) was a wealthy Scottish peeress. After her father died when she was a few months old, and her sisters by the time she was 10, she inherited the family's titles. She was married to James Scott, Duke of Monmouth, and the couple had six children, only two of whom survived past infancy.

Her husband was executed after the failure of the Monmouth Rebellion, and she went on to marry again.

== Early life ==
Scott was born on 11 February 1651, in Dundee. Her father was Francis Scott, 2nd Earl of Buccleuch, her mother Margaret Leslie, daughter of John Leslie, 6th Earl of Rothes. Scott had two elder sisters, Mary and Margaret, but no brothers. Scott's father died the same year she was born, and her sisters died, Margaret in 1652 and Mary in 1661, leaving Scott to inherit the titles and estates.

There had been some complications, as Mary had been married, and it was therefore arguable that her husband would inherit the Scott honours; however, Mary's marriage was found to have been unlawful, due to her age, so the estates, with the titles of "Countess of Buccleuch", "Baroness Scott of Buccleuch", and "Baroness Scott of Whitchester and Eskdaill" passed to Anna.

== Titles ==
Upon her marriage in 1663, her husband took her surname, and the titles of Duke of Monmouth, Lord Scott of Whitchester and Eskdaill, Earl of Dalkeith, and Duke of Buccleuch were created, with remainder to the heirs male of his body by Anna, failing whom to the heirs whomsoever of her body who shall succeed to the estates and Earldom of Buccleuch. On 16 January 1666, "the Duke and Duchess resigned their honours and estates into the hands of the Crown and obtained a novodamus vesting the titles of Duke of Buccleuch, Earl of Dalkeith and Earl of Buccleuch in the Duke of Monmouth, and the title of Duchess of Buccleuch, Countess of Dalkeith and Countess of Buccleuch, etc., in the Duchess conjunctly, severally and independently of each other in the event of death, forfeiture, etc., with remainder to the heirs male of their bodies, whom failing to the heirs male of the Duchess."

Following the Duke of Monmouth's death in 1685, the Duchess, whose titles were not affected by her husband's attainder because of the novodamus of 1666, resigned them into the hands of the Crown for a second time and obtained a new grant by a charter under the Great Seal, on 17 November 1687, of the title of Duchess of Buccleuch and her other honours to herself for life, and after her death to James, Earl of Dalkeith, and his heirs-male. The 1687 charter was ratified by Act of Parliament on 15 June 1693. The Duke of Monmouth's heirs were rehabilitated by a further Act of Parliament on 4 July 1690.

== Family ==
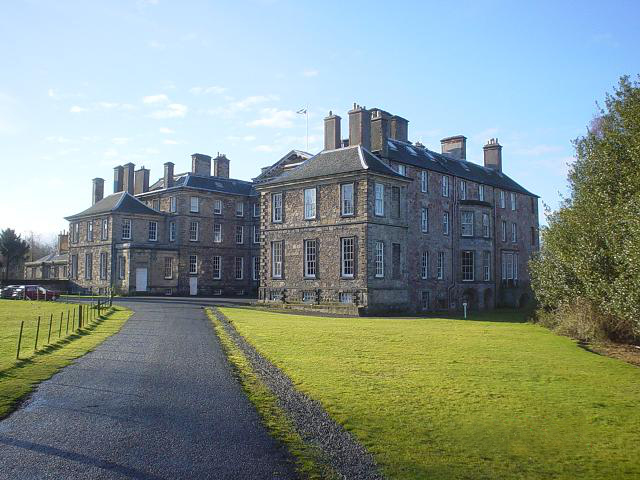
Dalkeith Palace, Midlothian

On 20 April 1663, the twelve-year-old Anne married the fourteen-year-old James Crofts, Duke of Monmouth, the oldest illegitimate son of Charles II (eldest surviving son of Charles I), by his mistress, Lucy Walter. James had been born in Rotterdam during the Second English Civil War, where his father was with his sister, Mary and his brother-in-law William II, Prince of Orange. The couple had six children:

- Charles Scott, Earl of Doncaster (24 August 1672–9 February 1674), who died in infancy.
- James Scott, Earl of Dalkeith (1674–1705), who married Lady Henrietta Hyde, daughter of Laurence Hyde, 1st Earl of Rochester.
- Lady Anne Scott (17 February 1675–buried 13 August 1685), who died in childhood.
- Henry Scott, 1st Earl of Deloraine (1676–1730), who married Anne Duncombe, the daughter of William Duncombe. After her death in 1720, he married Mary, the granddaughter of Col. Philip Howard.
- Lord Francis Scott (1678–buried 8 December 1679), who died young.
- Lady Charlotte Scott (1683–buried 5 September 1683), who died in infancy.

Her husband, the Duke of Monmouth and Buccleuch, was attainted and executed for high treason on 15 July 1685 following the failure of Monmouth's Rebellion, in which he had attempted to seize the English throne and overthrow James II (the younger brother of his father, who became King of England, Scotland, and Ireland in February 1685 following the death of Charles II).

On 6 May 1688, Anne married Charles Cornwallis, 3rd Baron Cornwallis, with whom she later had three children: (Note: As the Duchess of Buccleuch. Lady Anne Scott was an heiress in her own right, so all of her children took her surname.)

- Lady Anne Scott (buried 25 July 1690)
- Lord George Scott (1692–buried 24 May 1693)
- Lady Isabella Scott (27 April 1694-18 February 1748)

Anne died in 1732, aged 80; her titles passed to her grandson Francis, the son of James, Earl of Dalkeith.

== Notes ==
Peerage of Scotland
New creation	Duchess of Buccleuch; 2nd creation 1663–1732	Succeeded by Francis Scott
Preceded by Mary Scott	Countess of Buccleuch; 1661–1732	Succeeded by Francis Scott
