= Jane Scott, Countess of Dalkeith =

British countess

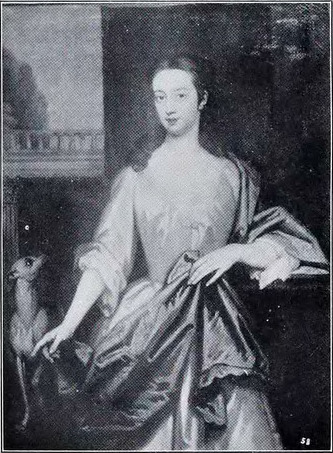
- Born: 24 May 1701; London
- Died: Langley
- Spouse(s): Francis Scott
- Children: Francis Scott
- Parent(s): James Douglas, 2nd Duke of Queensberry; Mary Boyle

Jane Scott, Countess of Dalkeith (24 May 1701 – 31 August 1729), formerly Lady Jane Douglas, was the first wife of Francis Scott, 2nd Duke of Buccleuch, but died prior to him succeeding in the dukedom.

She was born in London, the fourth daughter of James Douglas, 2nd Duke of Queensberry, and his wife, the former Mary Boyle, and thus a cousin of the future duke. The future duke, then Earl of Dalkeith, was to have been married to her namesake Lady Jane Douglas, the daughter of James Douglas, 2nd Marquess of Douglas, but the Duchess of Queensberry is said to have stepped in to preempt this arrangement.

They were married on 5 April 1720 at the Earl of Rochester's House, Privy Gardens, Whitehall. Lady Jane died in 1729 at Langley, Buckinghamshire, and was buried at Dalkeith Castle in Scotland. They had two sons and three daughters, including

- Francis Scott, Earl of Dalkeith (1721–1750)

Following her death, it was said by Lady Louisa Stuart that the duke "plunged into such low amours, and lived so entirely with the lowest company, that, although he resided constantly in the neighbourhood of London, his person was scarcely known to his equals, and his character fell into utter contempt." According to his will, he also had a number of illegitimate children by two other mothers.

Subsequently, the earl married Alice Powell and had further children. Both of his legitimate sons predeceased him, so he was succeeded by his grandson Henry Scott, 3rd Duke of Buccleuch.
