= John Leslie, 6th Earl of Rothes =

Scottish nobleman

John Leslie
- 6th Earl of Rothes
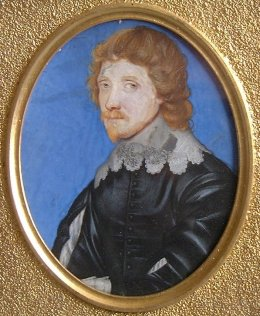
- Known for: one of the main leaders of the Covenanters
- Born: 1600
- Died: 23 August 1641 (aged 40–41)
- Spouse: Lady Anne Erskine
- Issue: Lady Mary Leslie; John Leslie, 1st Duke of Rothes; Lady Margaret Leslie
- Father: James Leslie, Master of Rothes
- Mother: Katherine Drummond

John Leslie, 6th Earl of Rothes (1600 – 23 August 1641) was a Scottish nobleman, one of the main leaders of the Covenanters.

== Life ==
Born in Leslie, Fife, he was the only son of James Leslie, Master of Rothes (died 1607) and Katherine Drummond, his second wife. In 1621 he was served heir to his grandfather, Andrew Leslie, 5th Earl of Rothes, who died in 1611.

Rothes was one of the commissioners at the parliament of 1621 who voted against the Five Articles of Perth. In 1626 he was sent to London, along with other commissioners, to petition against the Act of Revocation of 12 October 1625, by which church property in the hands of laymen reverted to the crown. At first, the king spoke against the petition as too high a strain from petitioners and subjects, but ultimately commissioners were appointed by which a compromise was arrived.

At the opening of parliament on the visit of Charles to Scotland in 1633, Rothes bore the sceptre, but then he resolutely opposed the king's ecclesiastical policy. He denounced the act which joined an acknowledgement of the royal prerogative with an acknowledgement of the king's authority to determine the apparel of the judges, magistrates, and the clergy, as an encroachment on the ecclesiastical prerogatives of the kirk. The king, however, refused to have the bill divided. A majority of the votes were declared in its favour, and Rothes's attempt to challenge the correctness of the numbers was overruled by Charles. At the closing of parliament on 20 June 1633, William Cunningham, 9th Earl of Glencairn took the place of Rothes in bearing the sceptre, and Charles was at his chilliest with Rothes and his friends.

Rothes headed the opposition to the proposed introduction of the Book of Common Prayer into the services of the kirk in 1638, and was active against episcopacy. Early in 1639, he addressed a circular letter to the noblemen and gentlemen who had been neutrals, urging them to take a stand on behalf of the liberties of the kirk. Along with John Campbell, 1st Earl of Loudoun and John Elphinstone, 2nd Lord Balmerino he undertook the revision of the new version of the covenant drawn up by Johnstone of Warriston and Alexander Henderson. He was one of the deputation who met the Marquis of Hamilton, the king's commissioner to the assembly, on his arrival to the assembly; and when the assembly was dissolved by the commissioner he presented a protest against its dissociation. In case of the rejection of the king's demands, Hamilton had threatened that Charles would march north to Scotland, and Rothes joined his kinsman Alexander Leslie in preparing for armed resistance. Leslie drilled Rothes's dependents and followers in Fife, while Rothes advised on the purchase of arms and accoutrements in Holland, and the recall of experienced Scottish officers serving in foreign countries. On 22 March Rothes and other nobles, with one thousand musketeers, went to the palace of Lord-treasurer Traquair at Dalkeith, seized much ammunition and arms, and brought the royal ensigns of the kingdom (the crown, sword and sceptre) to Edinburgh Castle. On 7 April the King issued a proclamation excepting leaders of the covenanters, including Rothes, from pardon.

Rothes accompanied the army of General David Leslie in June to Dunse Lew, and was one of the commissioners appointed to treat with the king. When the king's declaration was read by the herald on 24 June at Edinburgh, Rothes and other covenanting noblemen gave notice that they adhered to the assembly of Glasgow, but the herald refused to accept their protestation. The covenanters were slow to disband their forces, and their leaders were again summoned to confer with Charles at Berwick. Rothes was the principal spokesman of the opposition, and the king denounced him angrily.

At the parliament held in Edinburgh in the following September Rothes was chosen a lord of the articles. Rothes and the covenanting noblemen sent a letter to the king of France, asking for his aid against England, but it was intercepted in April, and was sent to the king. The Scots anticipated Charles's war plans by invading England, and on 27 August 1640 Rothes, in command of a regiment, and as one of the committee of the estates, accompanied Leslie's army across the River Tweed; according to Gilbert Burnet, the Scots were encouraged by a message sent by Viscount Savile, for three people: Rothes, the Earl of Argyll, and Johnston of Warriston.

After the occupation of Newcastle, Rothes was one of the commissioners sent to London in November to conclude the negotiations after the Treaty of Ripon, and after the pacification was arranged he remained in England at the court of Charles. There he hoped to obtain office in the royal household, and to marry Christian Cavendish, Countess of Devonshire. In August 1641 he was a factor in the plans Charles had to venture into Scotland, expecting his help. But he died quickly of consumption, at Richmond, Surrey, on 23 August. He was buried at Leslie, Fife, on 31 November.

== Works ==
- A Relation of Proceedings Concerning the Affairs of the Kirk of Scotland: From August 1637 to July 1638. Ballantyne. 1830.

== Children ==
On 28 December 1614, he married Lady Anne Erskine, daughter of Sir John Erskine, Earl of Mar and Marie Stewart (daughter of Esmé Stewart). John and Anne had three children:

1. Lady Mary Leslie (born before 1625) married Hugh Montgomerie, 7th Earl of Eglinton
2. John Leslie, 1st Duke of Rothes (1630–1681) married Lady Anne Crawford–Lindsay
3. Lady Margaret Leslie (born before 1632 – died in February 1688) married (1) Alexander Leslie, lord Balgony; (2) Francis Scott, 2nd Earl of Buccleuch; (3) David Wemyss, 2nd Earl of Wemyss.

Peerage of Scotland
Preceded by Andrew Leslie	Earl of Rothes; 1611–1641	Succeeded by John Leslie
