= James Scott, Duke of Monmouth =

English Army officer and courtier (1649–1685)

General His Grace The Duke of Monmouth KG PC
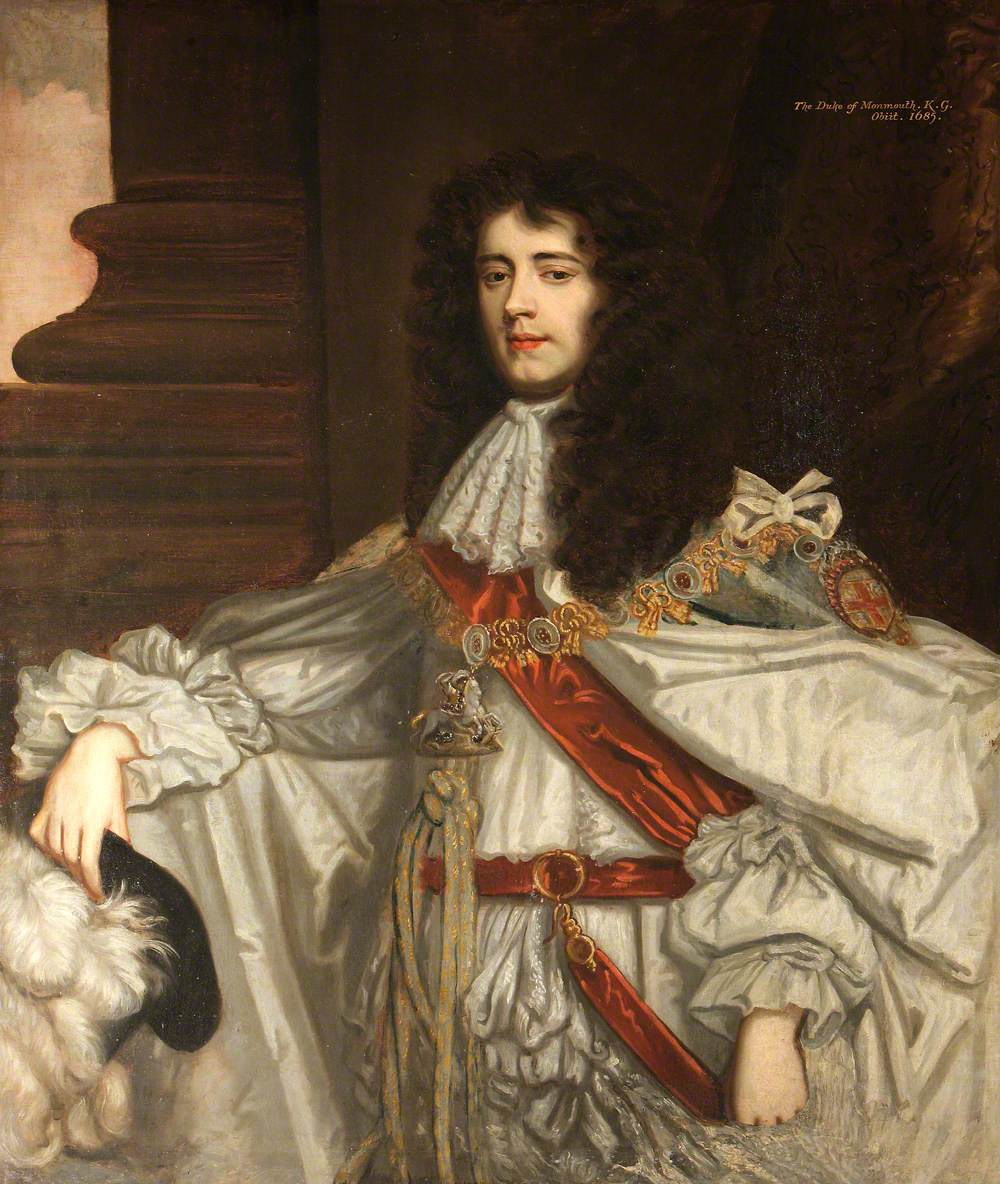
- Portrait by Peter Lely, c. 1680
- Born: 9 April 1649; Rotterdam, Dutch Republic
- Died: 15 July 1685 (aged 36); Great Tower Hill, Tower of London, Liberties of the Tower, England
- Spouse: Anne Scott, 1st Duchess of Buccleuch (m. 1663)
- Issue: 9, including: James Scott, Earl of Dalkeith; Henry Scott, 1st Earl of Deloraine; James Crofts; Henrietta Paulet, Duchess of Bolton
- Parents: Charles II of England; Lucy Walter
- Military career
- Allegiance: England
- Branch: English Army
- Service years: 1665–1685
- Rank: General
- Conflicts: Second Anglo-Dutch War; Third Anglo-Dutch War; Franco-Dutch War; Monmouth Rebellion

General James Scott, Duke of Monmouth, Duke of Buccleuch (9 April 1649 – 15 July 1685) was an English Army officer and courtier. Originally called James Crofts or James Fitzroy, he was born in Rotterdam in the Netherlands, the eldest illegitimate son of Charles II of England with his mistress Lucy Walter.

The Duke of Monmouth served in the Second Anglo-Dutch War and commanded English troops taking part in the Third Anglo-Dutch War before commanding the Anglo-Dutch brigade fighting in the Franco-Dutch War. He led the unsuccessful Monmouth Rebellion in 1685, an attempt to depose his uncle King James II and VII. After one of his officers declared Monmouth the legitimate king in the town of Taunton in Somerset, Monmouth attempted to capitalise on his Protestantism and his position as the son of Charles II, in opposition to James, who had become a Roman Catholic. The rebellion failed, and Monmouth was beheaded for treason on 15 July 1685.

== Biography ==
=== Parentage ===
Charles, Prince of Wales (later King Charles II), moved to The Hague in 1648, during the Second English Civil War, where his sister Mary and his brother-in-law William II, Prince of Orange, were based. The French relatives of Charles' mother, Queen Henrietta Maria, had invited Charles to wait out the war in France with the Queen, but he opted for the Netherlands, as he believed there was more support to be gained for the cause of his father, King Charles I, in the Netherlands than in France. During the summer of 1648, the Prince of Wales became captivated by Lucy Walter, who was in The Hague for a short visit. The lovers were only eighteen, and she is often spoken of as his first mistress, though he may have begun having affairs as early as 1646. Their son James was born in Rotterdam in the Netherlands on 9 April 1649, and spent his early years in Schiedam.

It has been rumoured that in the summer of 1648 Lucy had been the mistress of Colonel Robert Sidney, a younger son of the Earl of Leicester. As Charles had no legitimate surviving children, his younger brother James, Duke of York, was next in line to the throne. When the boy grew up, those loyal to the Duke of York spread rumours about the young James' resemblance to Sidney. These voices may have been encouraged by the Duke of York himself, who wished to prevent any of the fourteen royal bastards his brother acknowledged from gaining support in the succession. In 2012, a DNA test of Monmouth's patrilineal descendant the 10th Duke of Buccleuch showed that he shared the same Y chromosome as a distant Stuart cousin; this is evidence that Charles II was indeed Monmouth's father.

As an illegitimate son, James was ineligible to succeed to the English or Scottish thrones, unless he could prove rumours that his parents had married secretly. He came to maintain that his parents were married and that he possessed evidence of their marriage, but he never produced it. King Charles II testified in writing to his Privy Council that he had never been married to anyone except his queen consort, Catherine of Braganza.

=== Early life ===
James had a younger sister or half-sister, Mary Crofts, whose father may have been Lord Taaffe. Mary later married the Irishman William Sarsfield, thus becoming the sister-in-law of the Jacobite general Patrick Sarsfield.

In March 1658, young James was kidnapped by one of the king's men, sent to Paris, and placed in the care of William Crofts, 1st Baron Crofts, whose surname he took. He briefly attended a school in Familly.

=== Officer and commander ===
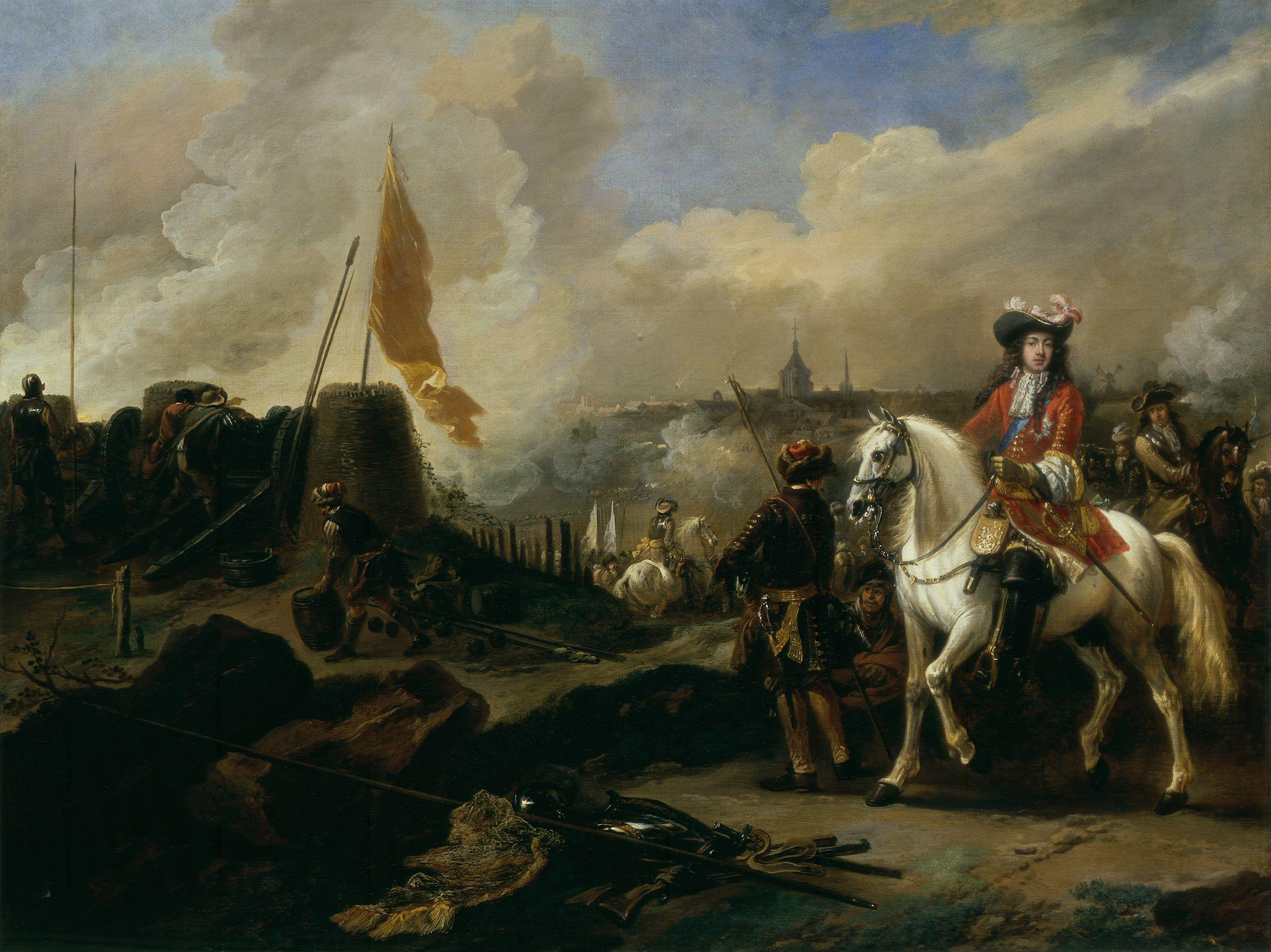
c. 1675 painting of Scott at the 1673 siege of Maastricht by Jan Wyck

On 14 February 1663, almost 14 years old, shortly after having been brought to England, James was created Duke of Monmouth, with the subsidiary titles of Earl of Doncaster and Baron Scott of Tynedale, all three in the Peerage of England, and, on 28 March 1663, he was appointed a Knight of the Garter.

On 20 April 1663, just days after his 14th birthday, the Duke of Monmouth was married to the heiress Anne Scott, 4th Countess of Buccleuch. He took his wife's surname upon marriage. The day after his marriage, the couple were made Duke and Duchess of Buccleuch, Earl and Countess of Dalkeith, and Lord and Lady Scott of Whitchester and Eskdale in the Peerage of Scotland. The Duke of Monmouth was popular, particularly for his Protestantism. The king's official heir presumptive, James, Duke of York, had openly converted to Roman Catholicism.

In 1665, at the age of 16, Monmouth served in the English fleet under his uncle, the Duke of York, in the Second Anglo-Dutch War. In June 1666, he returned to England to become captain of a troop of cavalry. On 16 September 1668 he was made colonel of His Majesty's Own Troop of Horse Guards. He acquired Moor Park in Hertfordshire in April 1670. Following the death in 1670, without a male heir, of Josceline Percy, 11th Earl of Northumberland, the earl's estates reverted to the Crown. King Charles II awarded the estates to Monmouth. The Countess of Northumberland successfully sued for the estates to be returned to the late Earl's only daughter and sole heiress, Lady Elizabeth Percy (1667–1722).

At the outbreak of the Third Anglo-Dutch War in 1672, a brigade of 6,000 English and Scottish troops was sent to serve as part of the French army (in return for money paid to King Charles), with Monmouth as its commander. He became Lord Lieutenant of the East Riding of Yorkshire and Governor of Kingston-upon-Hull in April 1673. In the campaign of 1673 and in particular at the Siege of Maastricht that June, Monmouth gained a considerable reputation as one of Britain's finest soldiers. He was reported to be replacing Marshal Schomberg as commander of England's Zealand Expedition, but this did not happen.

In 1674, Monmouth became Chancellor of the University of Cambridge and Master of the Horse, and King Charles II directed that all military orders should be brought first to Monmouth for examination, thus giving him effective command of the forces; his responsibilities included the movement of troops and the suppression of riots.

He successfully petitioned Charles II of England for the post of Commander-in-Chief of the Forces and was granted it in 1674. After his execution the post was again not filled until 1690, when it was bestowed upon John Churchill, Duke of Marlborough, during the King's absence in Ireland. In March 1677, he also became Lord Lieutenant of Staffordshire.

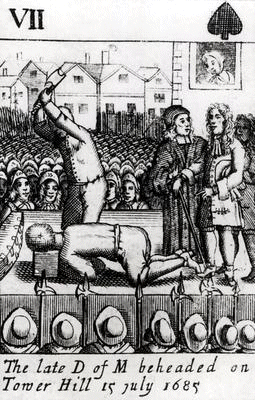
Monmouth's execution on Tower Hill, 15 July 1685 (O.S), in a popular print

In 1678, Monmouth was the commander of the Anglo-Dutch brigade, now fighting for the United Provinces against the French, and he distinguished himself at the Battle of Saint-Denis in August that year during the Franco-Dutch War, further increasing his reputation. The following year, after his return to Britain, he commanded the small army raised to put down the rebellion of the Scottish Covenanters and despite being heavily outnumbered, he decisively defeated the (admittedly poorly equipped) Covenanter rebels at the Battle of Bothwell Bridge on 22 June 1679.

=== Exile and rebellion ===
During the Exclusion Crisis of 1679 to 1681, Monmouth attracted support as successor to the throne. Charles's heir, his brother, the Duke of York, was, as a Catholic, deeply unpopular and a bill was put before parliament excluding him from the succession. Monmouth's supporters hoped that he would be legitimised and become Charles's Protestant successor instead. However, the king was adamant in his opposition to changing the succession and prevented the bill from passing by dissolving parliament in May 1679. As Monmouth's popularity with the masses increased, he was obliged by his father to go into exile in the Dutch United Provinces in September 1679. Following the discovery of the so-called Rye House Plot in 1683, which aimed to assassinate both Charles II and his brother James, Monmouth, who had been encouraged by his supporters to assert his right to the throne, was identified as a conspirator.

After King Charles II's death in February 1685, Monmouth led the Monmouth Rebellion, landing with three ships at Lyme Regis in Dorset in early June 1685, in an attempt to take the throne from his uncle, James II and VII. He published a "Declaration for the defence and vindication of the protestant religion and of the laws, rights and privileges of England from the invasion made upon them, and for delivering the Kingdom from the usurpation and tyranny of us by the name of James, Duke of York": King James responded to this by issuing an order for the publishers and distributors of the paper to be arrested. Monmouth declared himself as the rightful king at various places along the route including Axminster, Chard, Ilminster and Taunton. The two armies met at the Battle of Sedgemoor on 6 July 1685, the last clear-cut pitched battle on open ground between two military forces fought on English soil: Monmouth's makeshift force could not compete with the regular army, and was soundly defeated.

=== Capture ===
Following the battle a reward of £5,000 was offered for his capture. On 8 July 1685, Monmouth was arrested near Ringwood in Hampshire, by tradition "in a field of peas". The events surrounding his capture are described by George Roberts in Tait's Edinburgh Magazine.

Upon the 7th, about five in the morning, some of the Lord Lumley's said scouts riding in the road near Holt Lodge in Dorset, four miles [six kilometres] west of Ringwood in Hampshire, just at the turn of a cross way, surprised and seized two suspected persons, which, when the Lord Lumley came up, proved to be Lord Grey and Hollyday the guide. Lord Lumley now commenced a strict examination of the cottages scattered thickly over this heathy country, and called those to assist him who were acquainted with the locality. Sir William Portman was informed of the capture that had been made, and hastened to the spot, with as many of his horse and foot as he could suddenly get together. As Lord Lumley was making inquiries of the cottagers, a poor woman, Amy Farrant, directed him to a hedge, over which she had seen two men go. This hedge proved to be part of the outbounds of several enclosed fields, some overgrown with fern and brakes, and others sown with rye, peas, and oats. The assembled militia were placed around these outbounds, at short distances from each other, while horse and foot performed their assigned duty – that of beating about within.

When the Duke had left his horse at Woodyates Inn, he exchanged clothes with a shepherd, who was soon discovered by local loyalists and interrogated. Dogs were then put onto the Duke's scent. Monmouth dropped his gold snuff box, full of gold pieces, in a pea field, where it was afterwards found.

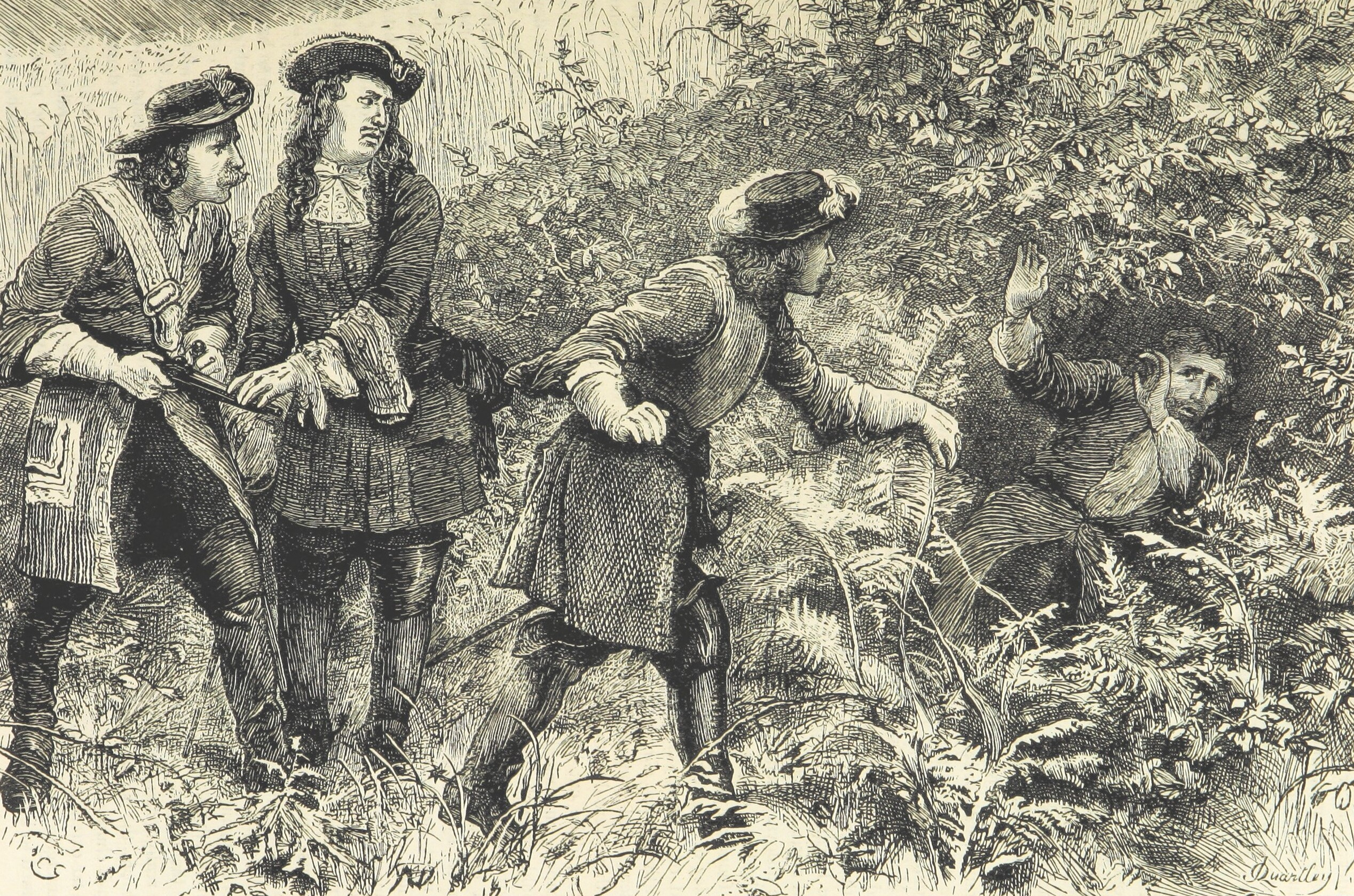
1873 illustration of Monmouth's capture

From Woodyates Inn the Duke had gone to Shag's Heath, in the middle of which was a cluster of small farms, called the "Island". Amy Farrant gave information that the fugitives were concealed within the Island. The Duke, accompanied by Busse the Brandenburgher, remained concealed all day, with soldiers surrounding the area and threatening to set fire to the woodland. Busse deserted him at 1 am, and was later captured and interrogated, and is believed to have given away the Duke's hiding place. The spot was at the north-eastern extremity of the Island, now known as Monmouth's Close, in the manor of Woodlands, the property of the Earl of Shaftesbury. At about 7 am Henry Parkin, a militia soldier and servant of Samuel Rolle, discovered the brown skirt of Monmouth's coat as he lay hidden in a ditch covered with fern and brambles under an ash tree, and called for help. The Duke was seized. Bystanders shouted out "Shoot him! shoot him!", but Sir William Portman happening to be near the spot, immediately rode up, and laid hands on him as his prisoner. Monmouth was then "in the last extremity of hunger and fatigue, with no sustenance but a few raw peas in his pocket. He could not stand, and his appearance was much changed. Since landing in England, the Duke had not had a good night's rest, or eaten one meal in quiet, being perpetually agitated with the cares that attend unfortunate ambition". He had "received no other sustenance than the brook and the field afforded".

The Duke was taken to Holt Lodge, in the parish of Wimborne, about one mile (1.5 kilometres) away, the residence of Anthony Etterick, a magistrate who asked the Duke what he would do if released, to which he answered: "that if his horse and arms were but restored to him at the same time, he needed only to ride through the army; and he defied them to take him again". The magistrate ordered him taken to London.

=== Attainder and execution ===
Attainder, Duke of Monmouth Act 1685
- Act of Parliament
- Parliament of England
- Long title: An Act to Attaint James Duke of Monmouth of High-Treason.
- Citation: 1 Ja. 2. c. 2
- Territorial extent: England and Wales

Dates
- Royal assent: 16 June 1685
- Commencement: 19 May 1685 (Note: Start of session.)
- Repealed: 30 July 1948
Other legislation
Repealed by	Statute Law Revision Act 1948

Status: Repealed

Text of statute as originally enacted

Following Monmouth's capture, Parliament passed an Act of Attainder, the Attainder, Duke of Monmouth Act 16851 Ja. 2. c. 2:

Whereas James Duke of Monmouth has in an hostile Manner Invaded this Kingdom and is now in open Rebellion Laying War against the King contrary to the Duty of his Allegiance, Be it enacted by the Kings most Excellent Majesty by and with the Advice and Consent of the Lords Spiritual and Temporal and Commons in this Parliament assembled and by the Authorities of the same, That the said James Duke of Monmouth Stand and be Convicted and Attainted of High-Treason and that he suffer Paines of Death and Incurr all Forfeitures as a Traitor Convicted and Attainted of High Treason.

The king took the unusual step of allowing his nephew an audience, despite having no intention of extending a pardon to him, thus breaking with a longstanding tradition that the king would give an audience only when he intended to show clemency. The prisoner unsuccessfully implored his mercy and even offered to convert to Catholicism, but to no avail. The king, disgusted by his abject behaviour, coldly told him to prepare to die, and later remarked that Monmouth "did not behave as well as I expected". Numerous pleas for mercy were addressed to the king, but he ignored them all, even that of his sister-in-law, the Dowager Queen Catherine.

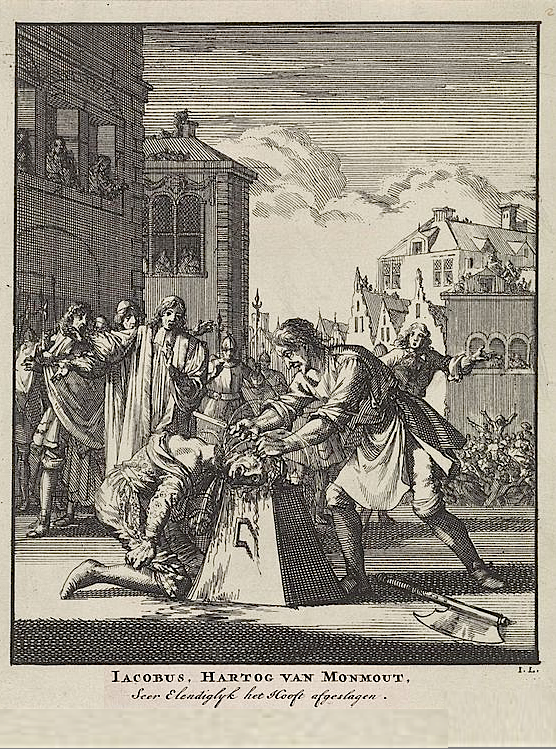
A 1698 Dutch etching by Jan Luyken of the execution of the Duke of Monmouth

Monmouth was beheaded by Jack Ketch on 15 July 1685, on Tower Hill. Shortly beforehand, Bishops Turner of Ely and Ken of Bath and Wells visited the Duke to prepare him for eternity, but withheld the Eucharist, for the condemned man refused to acknowledge that either his rebellion or his relationship with Lady Wentworth had been sinful. It is said that before laying his head on the block, Monmouth specifically bade Ketch finish him at one blow, saying he had mauled others before. Disconcerted, Ketch did indeed inflict multiple blows with his axe, the prisoner rising up reproachfully the while – a ghastly sight that shocked the witnesses, drawing forth execrations and groans. Some say a knife was at last employed to sever the head from the twitching body. Sources vary; some claim eight blows, the official Tower of London fact sheet says it took five blows, while Charles Spencer, in his book Blenheim, puts it at seven.

Monmouth was buried in the Church of St Peter ad Vincula in the Tower of London. His Dukedom was forfeited, but his subsidiary titles, Earl of Doncaster and Baron Scott of Tindale, were restored by King George II on 23 March 1743 to his grandson Francis Scott, 2nd Duke of Buccleuch (1695–1751).

=== Popular legends ===
According to legend, a portrait was painted of Monmouth after his execution: the tradition states that it was realised after the execution that there was no official portrait of the Duke, so his body was exhumed, the head stitched back on, and it was sat for its portrait to be painted. However, there are at least two formal portraits of Monmouth tentatively dated to before his death currently in the National Portrait Gallery in London, and another painting once identified with Monmouth that shows a sleeping or dead man that could have given rise to the story.

One of the many theories about the identity of the Man in the Iron Mask is that he was Monmouth: the theory is that someone else was executed in his place, and James II arranged for Monmouth to be taken to France and put in the custody of his cousin Louis XIV.

Henry Purcell set to music (Z. 481) a satirical poem by an unidentified author, ridiculing Monmouth and his parentage:

A grasshopper and a fly,
In summer hot and dry,
In eager argument were met
About priority.

Says the fly to the grasshopper:
"From mighty race I spring,
Bright Phoebus was my dad 'tis known,
And I eat and drink with a king."

Says the grasshopper to the fly:
"Such rogues are still preferr'd;
Your father might be of high degree,
But your mother was but a turd."

So, rebel Jemmy Scott,
That did to the empire soar,
His father might be the Lord knows what,
But his mother we knew a whore.

== Arms ==
James Scott's first coat of arms was initially granted in 1663 at the same time he was created Duke of Monmouth: Quarterly, 1st and 4th, Ermine, on a Pile gules three Lions passant guardant or; 2nd and 3rd: Or, within a double Tressure flory counterflory gules, on an Inescutcheon azure, three Fleurs-de-Lys gold. Crest: Upon a Chapeau gules turned up ermine, a Dragon passant or gorged with a Crown having a Chain gules. Supporters: Dexter, a Unicorn argent, armed, maned and unguled or, gorged with a Crown having a Chain gules affixed thereto: Sinister, a Hart argent, attired and unguled or, gorged with a Crown having a Chain gules affixed thereto.

This version of the arms, which consisted in a creative reorganisation of the Royal Arms, drew numerous complaints as it did not include any marker to signify his illegitimacy, and rumours that Charles might attempt to legitimise James started to spread.

Four years later, after James' marriage, and with Charles' growing realisation that he would not legitimise him, a new design was granted: the Arms of King Charles II debruised by a baton sinister Argent; An inescutcheon of Scott was added on top: Or, on a Bend azure a Mullet of six points between two Crescents of the field. To show the importance of James' marriage to Anne Scott, which he had married shortly after receiving his original arms. The Crest and Supporters from his previous arms were kept.

== Children ==
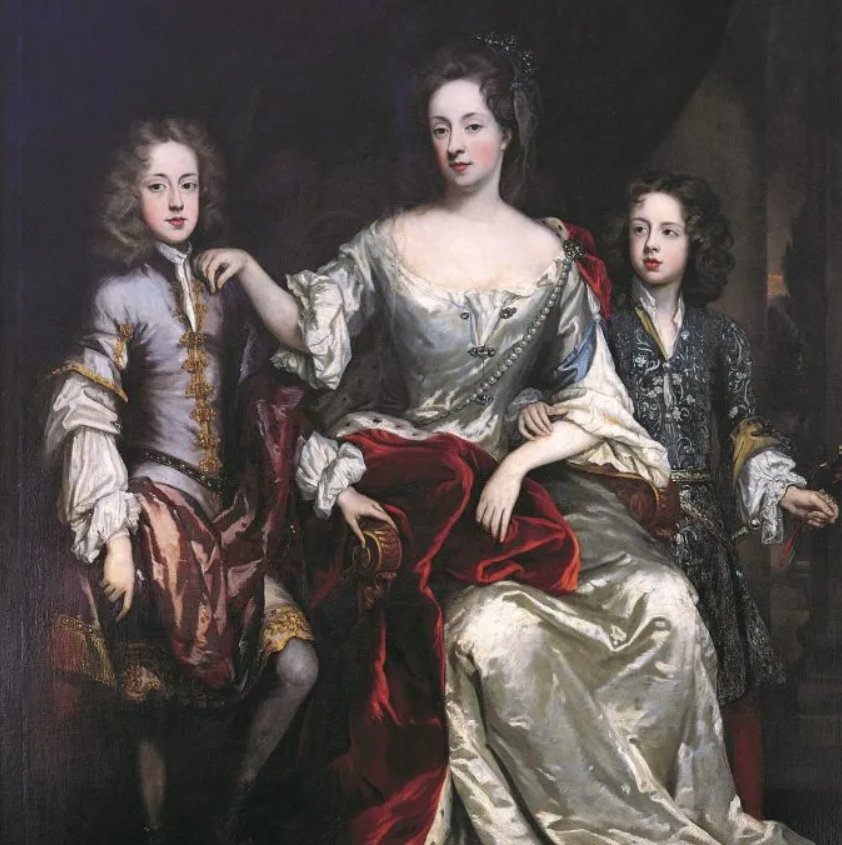
Anna, Duchess of Buccleuch and her two surviving sons

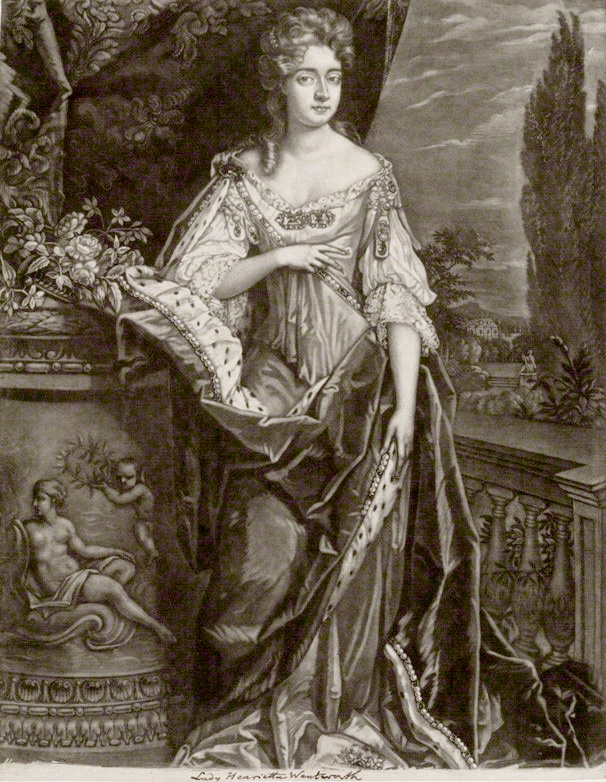
Baroness Wentworth

His marriage to Anne Scott, 1st Duchess of Buccleuch resulted in the birth of six children:

- Charles Scott, Earl of Doncaster (24 August 1672 – 9 February 1673/1674)
- James Scott, Earl of Dalkeith (23 May 1674 – 14 March 1705). He was married on 2 January 1693/1694 to Henrietta Hyde, daughter of Laurence Hyde, 1st Earl of Rochester. They were parents to Francis Scott, 2nd Duke of Buccleuch.
- Lady Anne Scott (17 February 1675 – 13 August 1685)
- Henry Scott, 1st Earl of Deloraine (1676 – 25 December 1730)
- Francis Scott (died an infant; buried 8 December 1679)
- Lady Charlotte Scott (died an infant; buried 5 September 1683)

His affair with his mistress Eleanor Needham, daughter of Sir Robert Needham of Lambeth resulted in the birth of three children:

- James Crofts (died March 1732), major-general in the Army.
- Henrietta Crofts (c. 1682 – 27 February 1730). She was married around 1697 to Charles Paulet, 2nd Duke of Bolton.
- Isabel Crofts (died young)

Toward the end of his life he conducted an affair with Henrietta, Baroness Wentworth.

== Family tree ==
Edward Hyde; 1609–1674	Charles I 1600–1649
Henry Hyde; 1638–1709	Anne Hyde; 1637–1671	James II & VII; 1633–1701	Mary of Modena; 1658–1718	Mary; 1631–1660	Charles II; 1630–1685
James the old pretender 1688–1766
Anne; 1665–1714	Mary II; 1662–1694	William III & II; 1650–1702	(illegitimate); James Scott; 1649–1685

== Sources ==
- Beatty, Michael (2003). The English Royal Family of America, from Jamestown to the American Revolution. McFarland and co. ISBN 978-0-7864-1558-8.
- Macaulay, Thomas Babington (1878). The History of England from the Accession of James II, Volume I. Philadelphia: J. B. Lippincott & Co.
- Fraser, Antonia (1979), King Charles II, London: Weidenfeld and Nicolson, ISBN 978-0-297-77571-3
- Raithby, John (1819). "Chapter II. Rot. Parl. nu. 2., Statutes of the Realm". James the Second, 1685: An Act to Attaint James Duke of Monmouth of High-Treason. Vol. 6: 1685–94.
- Roberts, George (1844). Life, progresses and rebellion of James, Duke of Monmouth to his capture and execution. London: Longmans, Brown, Green and Longmans.
- Watson, J.N.P. (1979). Captain General and Rebel Chief: The Life of James, Duke of Monmouth. London: George Allen & Unwin. ISBN 978-0-04-920058-6.
- Williams, Hugh Noel (1915). Rival sultanas. Hutchinson & Co.

Political offices
Preceded by The Duke of Buckingham	Master of the Horse; 1674–1679	In commission Title next held by The Duke of Richmond
Legal offices
Preceded by The Earl of Oxford	Justice in Eyre south of the Trent; 1673–1679	Succeeded by The Earl of Chesterfield
Military offices
Preceded by The Lord Gerard	Captain and Colonel of His Majesty's Own Troop of Horse Guards; 1668–1679	Succeeded by The Duke of Albemarle
Preceded by The Lord Belasyse	Governor of Kingston-upon-Hull; 1673–1679	Succeeded by The Earl of Mulgrave
Vacant Title last held by Duke of Albemarle	Commander-in-Chief of the Forces; 1674–1685	Vacant Title next held by Earl of Marlborough
Vacant	Captain-General; 1678–1679	Vacant
Honorary titles
Preceded by The Lord Belasyse	Lord Lieutenant of the East Riding of Yorkshire; 1673–1679	Succeeded by The Earl of Mulgrave
Preceded by The Lord Brooke	Lord Lieutenant of Staffordshire; 1677–1679	Succeeded by The Earl of Sunderland
Preceded by The Lord Paget	Custos Rotulorum of Staffordshire; 1678–1680	Succeeded by The Earl of Sunderland
Peerage of Scotland
New creation	Duke of Buccleuch; 1663–1685	Vacant Title next held by Anne Scott
Peerage of England
New creation	Earl of Doncaster; 1663–1685	Vacant Title forfeit Title next held by Francis Scott
