= Francis Scott, 2nd Earl of Buccleuch =

Scottish peer

Arms of Scott of Buccleuch: Or, on a bend azure a mullet of six points between two crescents of the first

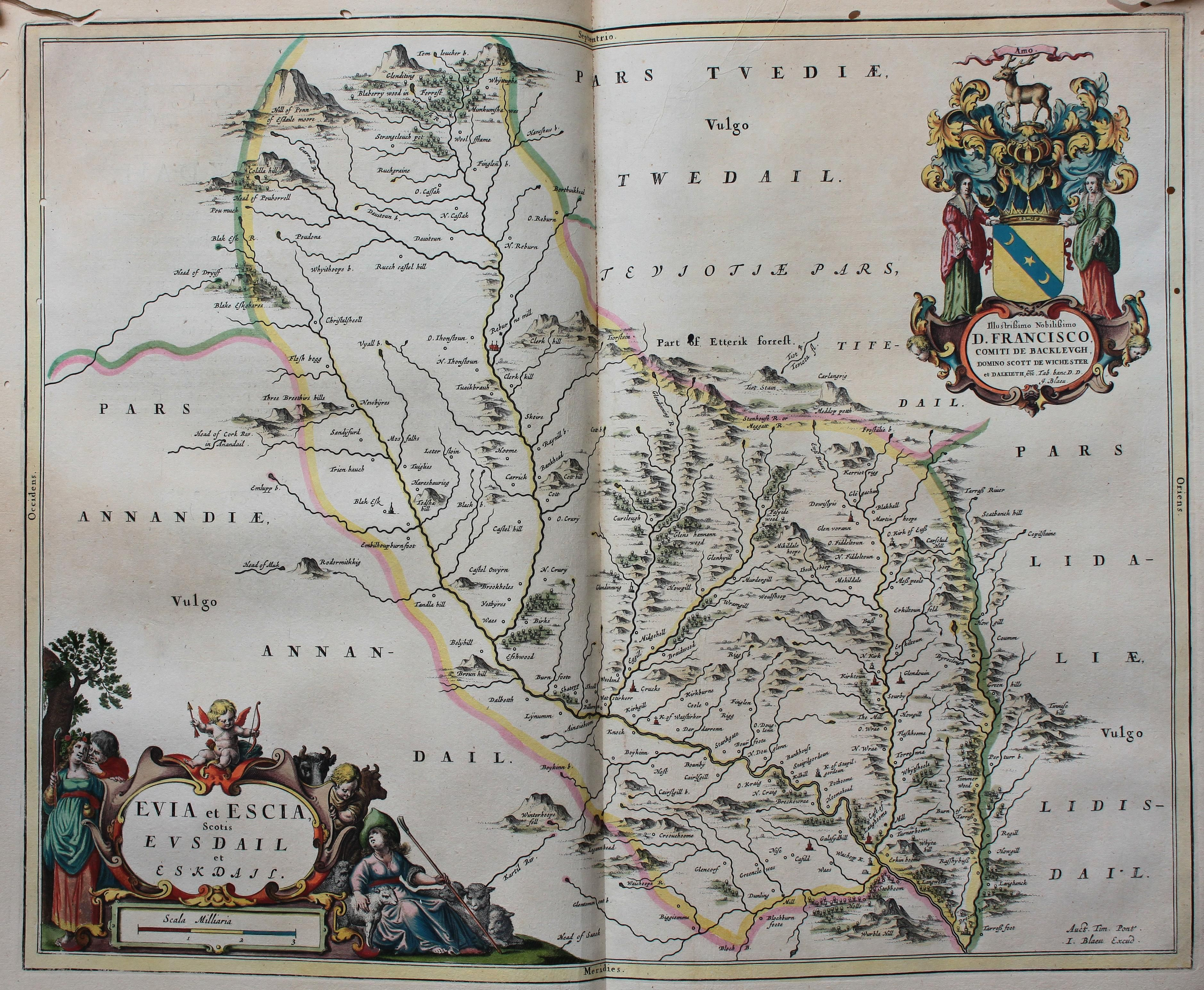
Arms of Francis, Earl of Buccleuch, on an old map

Francis Scott, 2nd Earl of Buccleuch (21 December 1626 – 22 November 1651) was a Scottish peer. He was the son of Walter Scott, 1st Earl of Buccleuch and his wife, Lady Mary Hay, daughter of Francis Hay, 9th Earl of Erroll. Upon the death of his father in 1633, Scott succeeded to the earldom of Buccleuch. On 25 July 1646, he married Lady Margaret Leslie, daughter of John Leslie, 6th Earl of Rothes.

They had four children:

- Mary Scott, 3rd Countess of Buccleuch (1647–1661)
- Walter Scott, Baron Scott of Buccleuch (1648, died in infancy)
- Lady Margaret Scott (1650-1652)
- Anne Scott, 1st Duchess of Buccleuch (1651–1732)

Peerage of Scotland
Preceded by Walter Scott	Earl of Buccleuch; 1633–1651	Succeeded by Mary Scott
