= Mary Montagu =

Mary Montagu may refer to:

- Lady Mary Faith Montagu (1911–1983), daughter of the 9th Earl of Sandwich
- Lady Mary Wortley Montagu (1689–1762), English writer
- Mary Montagu Douglas Scott, Duchess of Buccleuch (1900–1993), British duchess
- Mary Montagu, Duchess of Montagu (1689–1751), formerly Lady Mary Churchill, wife of John Montagu, 2nd Duke of Montagu
- Mary Montagu, Duchess of Montagu (1711–1775), daughter of the above, wife of George Brudenell, later Montagu, 4th Earl of Cardigan, and later Duchess of Montagu
- Mary Stuart, Countess of Bute (1718–1794), wife of John Stuart, 3rd Earl Stuart

== See also ==
- Mary Montagu-Scott (born 1964), British interior designer
