= Walhampton School =

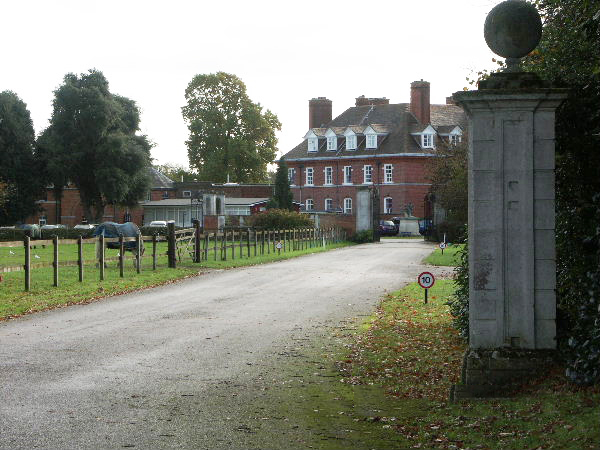

Location
- Walhampton; Lymington, Hampshire, SO41 5ZG; England; 50.7685°N 1.5313°W

Information
- Type: Preparatory school Day & Boarding
- Religious affiliation: Church of England
- Department for Education URN: 116525 Tables
- Headmaster: Jonny Timms
- Gender: Coeducational
- Age: 2 to 13
- Enrolment: 330~
- Colour: Blue
- Website: http://www.walhampton.com

Walhampton School is a coeducational private preparatory school situated in the hamlet of Walhampton, near Lymington, England. It is the result of the 1997 merger between Hordle House School, situated in Milford on Sea, and Walhampton School, which was based at the current site. The merged school was known as ’Hordle Walhampton’ until 2013, when it reverted to its previous name of 'Walhampton School'.

The Walhampton School was set up in 1948 by Audrey Brewer, who purchased the house and grounds from the Morrison family. In 1954 Brewer sold the school to John Bradfield, who converted it into a charitable trust.

Hordle House School was set up in 1926 by the Reverend Ernest Whately-Smith, MC.

The school has approximately 400 children aged between 2 and 13.

== Buildings and facilities ==
Walhampton House is an eighteenth-century building, with extensive changes in 1884 by Richard Norman Shaw and further changes in 1911 by Thomas Hayton Mawson. It is a Grade II listed building. The 1884 block is described by Historic England as "stiff and rather dull Queen Anne style". The school has a performing arts centre.

== Headship ==
=== Hordle House (founded 1926) ===
- 1926 Reverend Ernest Whately-Smith, MC
- 1950 Peter Whately-Smith and John Whately-Smith, the surviving sons of the above, as joint headmasters
- 1972 John Vernon
- 1994 Henry Phillips

=== Walhampton (founded 1948) ===
- 1948 Mrs Audrey ('Dordie') Brewer as principal with Reverend Sidney Philip Hayllar as headmaster
- 1954 John Bradfield and Peter Lawford as joint headmasters
- 1969 John Bradfield (solely)
- 1983 Andrew Robinson

=== Hordle Walhampton (formed by merger 1997) ===
In May 1996, Walhampton's board of governors announced the appointment of Adrian Gobat to succeed Andrew Robinson on his retirement. On 1 September 1997, Hordle House and Walhampton merged to form Hordle Walhampton School based at the Walhampton site. Adrian Gobat represented Walhampton as principal of the merged entity with Hordle House's headmaster, Henry Phillips, as headmaster.

- Sep 1997 Adrian Gobat as principal with Henry Philips as headmaster
- Dec 1997 Henry Philips (solely)
- 2012 Titus Mills

=== Walhampton (renamed 2013) ===
In 2013 Hordle Walhampton changed its name to Walhampton.

- (continued) Titus Mills
- Jan 2021 Jonny Timms

== Notable former pupils (ordered by date of birth) ==
- Charles Rob, MC (1913–2001), British surgeon
- Captain Peter Hardinge RN, MBE (1915-1987), Royal Navy officer
- Major-General Anthony Stanton, OBE (1915-1988), Royal Artillery officer
- Charles Beauclerk, 13th Duke of St Albans, OBE (1915–1988), English peer and British Army officer
- John Vernon Rob, CMG (1915–1971), British diplomat and first British High Commissioner to Singapore; brother of Charles Rob (above)
- Sir Iain MacRobert, 4th Bt of Douneside (1917–1941), WWII RAF pilot; a series of bomber and fighter planes were named after him and his two elder brothers
- Sir Patrick Nairne, GCB MC PC (1921–2013), senior civil servant and Master of St Catherine's College, Oxford
- Jeremy Howard-Williams, DFC (1922–1995), WWII fighter pilot and author of several books on the wartime RAF, crosswords, sailing and sail-making
- Stephen de Mowbray (1925–2016), Secret Intelligence Service (MI6) counterintelligence officer
- Brian Abel-Smith (1926–1996), British economist and political adviser
- Derek Jarman (1942–1994), film director and pioneering gay rights activist
- Anthony Inglis (born 1952), British conductor; son of Jeremy Howard-Williams (above)
- Ralph Douglas-Scott-Montagu, 4th Baron Montagu of Beaulieu (born 1961), English peer and President of the National Motor Museum Trust
- Gerald Vernon-Jackson, CBE (born 1962), Liberal Democrat politician and leader of Portsmouth City Council
- Rupert Goodman, FRGS OBE DL (born 1963), British publisher, international affairs expert and entrepreneur
- Paul Bliss (born 1964), music festival organiser
- Mary Montagu-Scott, DL (born 1964), English designer, High Sheriff of Hampshire 2017–18, Deputy Lieutenant of Hampshire 2018 and Commodore of the Beaulieu River Sailing Club
