= Michael C. Sedgwick =

Michael C. Sedgwick (1926–14 October 1983) was a British motoring writer.

== Motoring Author ==
Michael Sedgwick was educated at Winchester and Corpus Christi, Oxford. He started writing on motoring subjects in 1959 when he became an assistant editor of 'Veteran & Vintage' magazine. For much of that time he held the appointment of curator of the then Montagu Motor Museum at Beaulieu now the National Motor Museum. He also created the museum's library master index and began writing books in his own name. In addition, he did much of the extensive research for major works by Lord Montagu of Beaulieu on the subject of 'Jaguar Cars', 'Rolls of Rolls-Royce', 'The Gordon Bennett Races' and the three- volume set, 'Lost Causes of Motoring'. Michael resigned his museum post in 1966 to give more time to writing, albeit he retained links with the Montagu Motor Museum as Director of Research and as a member of the Advisory Council of the museum at Beaulieu.

From 1966, a series of books followed. He also made extensive contributions to the 'Encyclopedia of the Motor-Car' and other motoring encyclopedia's, edited by Nick Georgano which also covered commercial vehicles and motor sport. He wrote regularly for magazines published in Britain, Australia, France, Germany and the United States. The overwhelming aspect of his books and articles was his tenacious research and his ability to see any era of the motor vehicle in a social or commercial perspective was widely acknowledged.

== Christie's ==
Michael's devotion to research coupled with a retentive and photographic memory made him an outstanding repository of knowledge, which was always freely shared with others. This was especially valuable for his work as an auction consultant to Christie's International Auction house in London from 1972. In this field as in his writings, his expertise became renowned internationally.

== The Michael Sedgwick Memorial Trust ==
Michael Sedgwick died unexpectedly at his home in Midhurst, West Sussex, on 14 October 1983 at the age of 57. The Michael Sedgwick Memorial Trust was created in 1984 and exists to encourage new and original research into any aspect of motoring history and also to see this research reach the public domain. This can be through the publication of the research as a book, other printed medium or publishing on the World Wide Web. Today the Trust gives advice to would-be authors and tries to bring together authors and publishers. The Trust’s view is that even books with a very limited sales potential should be published if the subject matter is worthy and the research is new and comprehensive. In cases where the publisher believes that the subject is worthy of publication but is not going to be a viable commercial proposition, the Michael Sedgwick Trust can often offer some financial help to bridge the gap.

== Bibliography ==
Some of the hardbound books either written by or with significant contributions by Michael Sedgwick include:

- A-Z of cars 1945-1970 (Temple, 1986) with Mark Gillies
- A-Z of cars 1930s (Bay View, 1989) and Mark Gillies
- Antique Cars (John Wiley and Sons, 1980)
- Cars (Piccolo, 1986)
- Lord Montagu, The Gordon Bennett Races (Cassell,1963) research by Sedgwick
- Denis Jenkinson, The Schlumpf Obsession (Hamlyn,1977)historical consultant.
- Lord Montagu, Lost Causes of Motoring (Cassell, 1960) research by Michael Sedgwick
- Lord Montagu, Jaguar - a biography (Cassell, 1961) research by Michael Sedgwick
- Lord Montagu, Lost Causes of Motoring - Europe (Cassell, 1969–1971) research by Michael Sedgwick, in 2 volumes.
- Veteran Motor Cars (Salmon / Beaulieu, 1960)
- Early Cars (Weidenfeld & Nicolson, 1962)
- Cars in Colour (Batsford, 1968)
- Cars of the 1930s (Batsford, 1970)
- Veteran and Vintage Cars in Colour (Batsford, 1968)
- Cavalcade of Motoring (Macmillan, 1972)
- Fiat (Batsford, 1974)
- Passenger Cars 1924-1942 (Blandford, 1975)
- The Motor Car 1946-1956 (Batsford, 1979)
- Cars of the Thirties and Forties (London: Hamlyn, 1974)
- Veteran Cars (London: Ward Lock, 1980)
- Vintage Cars (London: Ward Lock, 1980)
- Bedford – GM's British Commercial (Dalton Watson / Beaulieu Books, 1980)
- Vauxhall (Dalton Watson / Beaulieu Books, 1981)
- Cars of the Fifties and Sixties (Feltham: Temple Press, 1983)
- The Veteran Car Club–50 Years Pictorial History (The VCC of Great Britain, 1981) with Elizabeth Nagle
