= Edward Douglas-Scott-Montagu, 3rd Baron Montagu of Beaulieu =

English Conservative politician (1926–2015)

The Right Honourable The Lord Montagu of Beaulieu
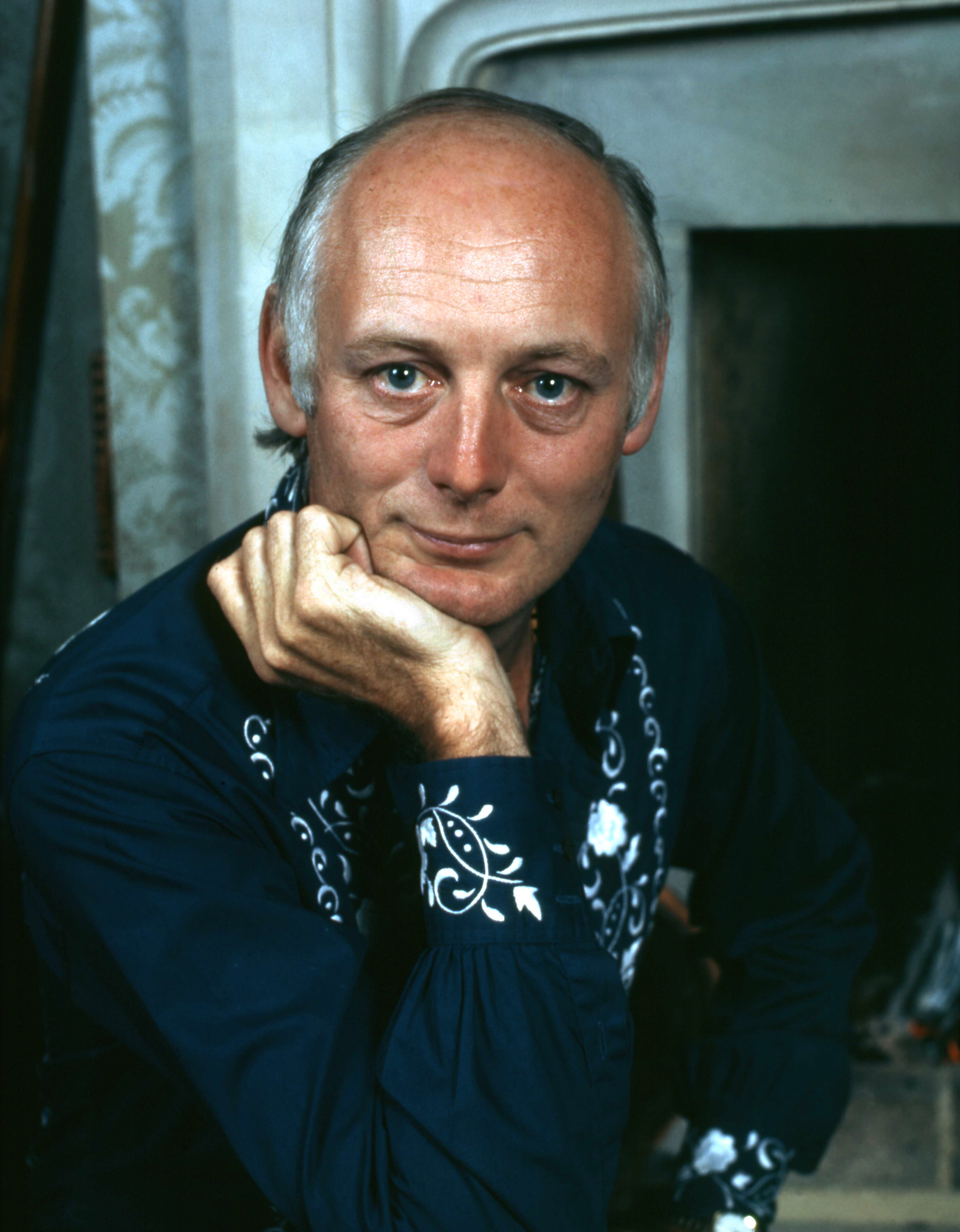
- Portrait by Allan Warren, 1974

Member of the House of Lords
- Lord Temporal
- Hereditary peerage 7 November 1947 – 11 November 1999
- Preceded by: The 2nd Baron Montagu of Beaulieu
- Succeeded by: Seat abolished
- Elected Hereditary Peer; 11 November 1999 – 31 August 2015
- Election: 1999
- Preceded by: Seat established
- Succeeded by: The 14th Lord Fairfax of Cameron

Personal details
- Born: Edward John Barrington Douglas-Scott-Montagu; 20 October 1926 London, England
- Died: 31 August 2015 (aged 88) Beaulieu Palace House, Hampshire, England
- Party: Conservative
- Spouses: Belinda Crossley (m. 1958; div. 1974) Fiona Herbert (m. 1974)
- Children: Ralph Douglas-Scott-Montagu; Mary Montagu-Scott; Jonathan Douglas-Scott-Montagu
- Parent: John Douglas-Scott-Montagu, 2nd Baron Montagu of Beaulieu (father)
- Education: Ridley College, Canada; Eton College; New College, Oxford

Military service
- Branch/service: Grenadier Guards
- Years of service: 1945–1948
- Rank: Lieutenant

Edward John Barrington Douglas-Scott-Montagu, 3rd Baron Montagu of Beaulieu (20 October 1926 – 31 August 2015), was a British aristocrat and Conservative politician, best known for founding the National Motor Museum, as well as for a pivotal cause célèbre following his 1954 conviction and imprisonment for alleged homosexual activity, a charge he denied.

== Early life ==
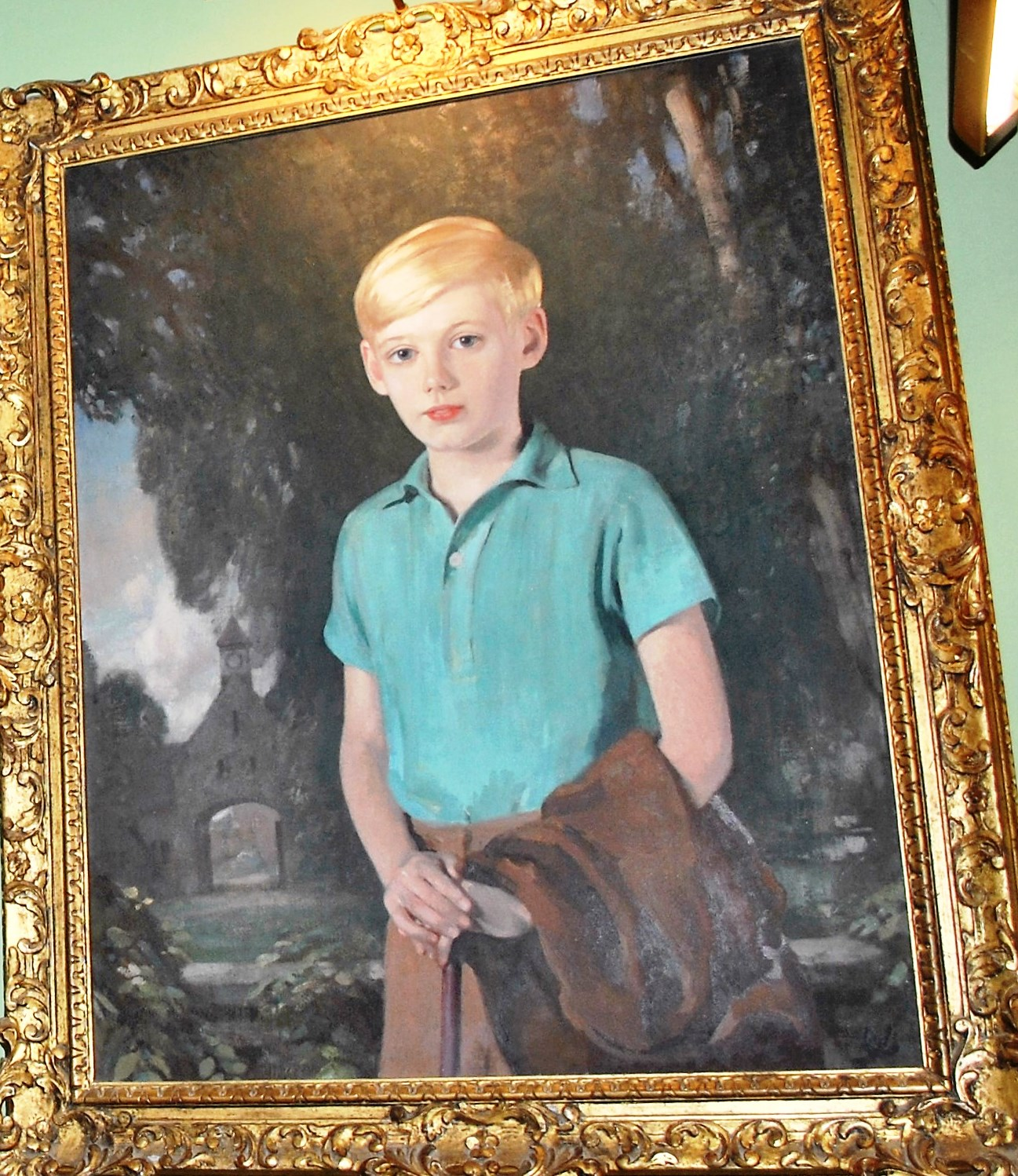
Edward Douglas-Scott-Montagu, 3rd Baron Montagu of Beaulieu, age 10 (Beaulieu Palace House)

Montagu was born at his grandparents' house in Thurloe Square, South Kensington, London, and inherited his barony in 1929 at the age of two, when his father John died of pneumonia. He held his peerage for the third longest time (86 years and 155 days) anyone has held a British peerage (the others being the 7th Marquess Townshend at 88 years, and the 13th Lord Sinclair at 87 years). His mother was his father's second wife, Alice Crake (1895–1996). He attended St Peter's Court, a prep school at Broadstairs in Kent, then Ridley College in Canada, Eton College and finally New College, Oxford.

After the end of World War II in Europe in 1945, Lord Montagu was called up for National Service and commissioned into the Grenadier Guards as a Lieutenant. He was stationed with the 3rd Battalion in Palestine from 1945 until 1947, performing internal security operations before the end of the British Mandate.

On coming of age in 1948 Lord Montagu immediately took his seat in the House of Lords, giving his maiden speech on the subject of Palestine soon thereafter. He read Modern History at Oxford but left without taking a degree after his rooms were smashed up in a fight between members of the Bullingdon Club, of which he was one, and the Oxford University Dramatic Society.

== Activities ==
Lord Montagu gained an interest in motoring from his father – who had commissioned the original Spirit of Ecstasy mascot for his Rolls-Royce – and with his family collection of historic cars this led him to open the National Motor Museum in the grounds of his stately home, Beaulieu Palace House, Beaulieu, Hampshire, in 1952.

From 1956 to 1961 he held the influential Beaulieu Jazz Festival in the grounds of Palace House; this was a leading contribution to the development of festival culture in Britain, as it attracted thousands of young people who, from 1958 on, would camp out and listen and dance to live music. The 1960 festival saw an altercation between modern and trad jazz fans that became known as the Battle of Beaulieu.

Montagu founded The Veteran And Vintage Magazine in 1956 and continued to develop the museum, making a name for himself in tourism. He was chairman of the Historic Houses Association from 1973 to 1978, President of the Institute of Traffic Administration from 1973 to 1974 and chairman of English Heritage from 1984 to 1992. Whilst there he appointed Jennifer Page (later of the Millennium Dome) as Chief Executive in 1989.

In the 1999 reform of the House of Lords, Montagu was one of 92 hereditary peers who remained in Parliament. In 2007, he was Vice-Commodore of the House of Lords Yacht Club.

He gave a notice of his intention to retire from the House of Lords on 17 September 2015, but he died before that.

== Sexuality ==
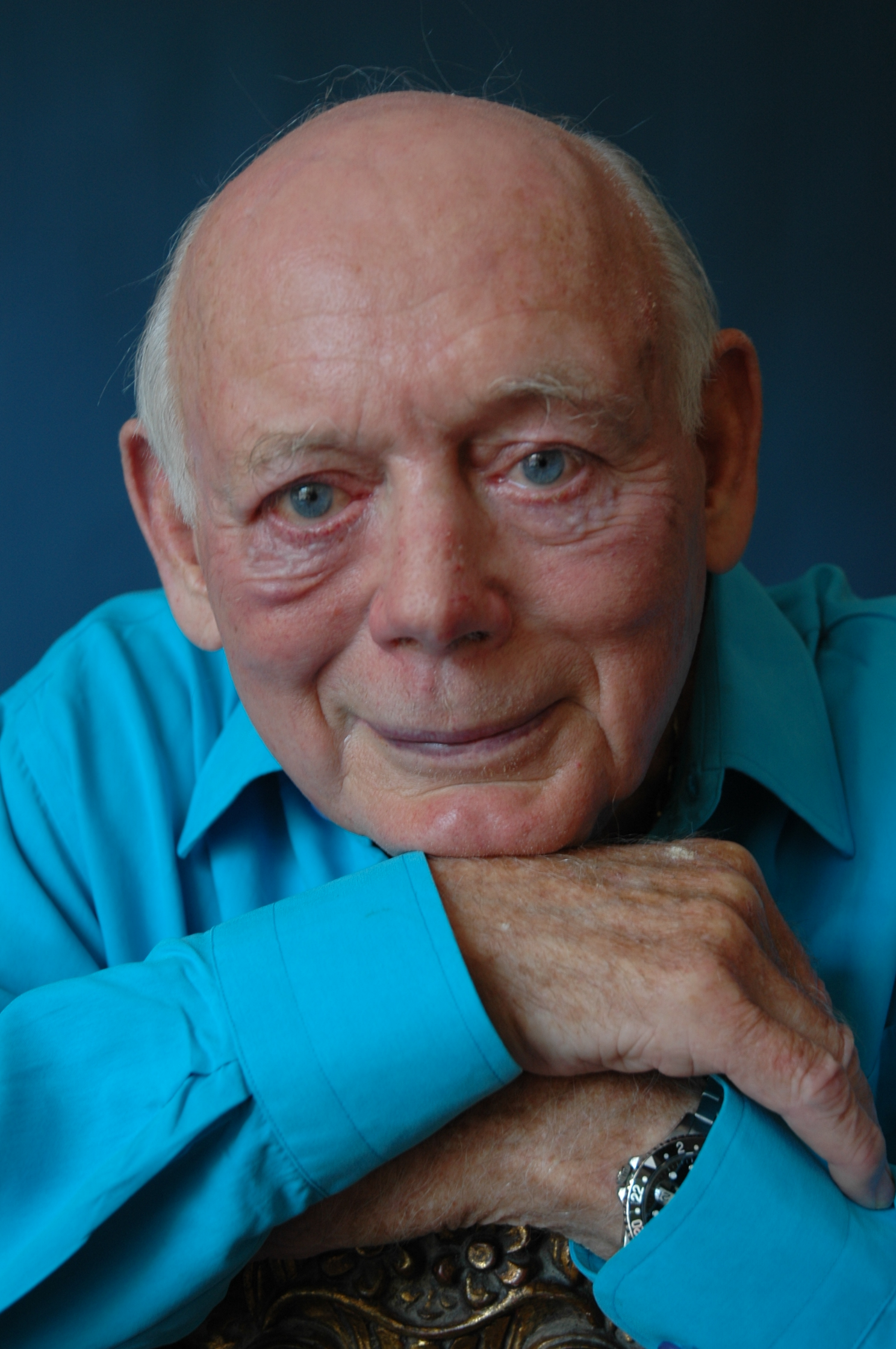
Lord Montagu of Beaulieu on his 80th birthday by Allan Warren

Montagu knew from an early stage of life that he was bisexual, and while attending Oxford was relieved to find others with similar feelings. In a 2000 interview he stated, "My attraction to both sexes neither changed nor diminished at university and it was comforting to find that I was not the only person faced with such a predicament. I agonised less than my contemporaries, for I was reconciled to my bisexuality, but I was still nervous about being exposed."

=== Trial and imprisonment ===
Despite keeping his homosexual affairs discreet and out of the public eye, in the mid-1950s, Montagu became "one of the most notorious public figures of his generation," after his conviction and imprisonment for "conspiracy to incite certain male persons to commit serious offences with male persons," a charge which was also used in the Oscar Wilde trials in 1895, which was derived from a law that remained on the statute books until 1967.

In old age, Montagu reminisced about it in these terms:

In the cold war atmosphere of the 1950s, when witch hunts later called the Lavender Scare were ruining the lives of many gay men and lesbian women in the United States, the parallel political atmosphere in Britain was virulently anti-homosexual. The then Home Secretary, Sir David Maxwell Fyfe, had promised "a new drive against male vice" that would "rid England of this plague." As many as 1,000 men were locked up in Britain's prisons every year amid a widespread police clampdown on homosexual offences. Undercover officers acting as "agents provocateurs" would pose as gay men soliciting in public places. The prevailing mood was one of barely concealed paranoia.

On two occasions Montagu was charged and committed for trial at Winchester Assizes, firstly in 1953 for having underage sex with a 14-year-old boy scout at his beach hut on the Solent, a charge he always denied. While supported by his family and innumerable friends, he became "the subject of endless blue jokes and innumerable bawdy songs".

When prosecutors failed to achieve a conviction, in what Montagu has characterised as a "witch hunt", he was arrested again in 1954 and charged with performing "gross offences" with an RAF serviceman during a weekend party at the beach hut on his country estate. Montagu always maintained he was innocent of this charge as well ("We had some drinks, we danced, we kissed, that's all"). Nevertheless, he was imprisoned for twelve months for "consensual homosexual offences" along with Michael Pitt-Rivers and Peter Wildeblood.

Brian Sewell said in 2012, "Edward Montagu was unlucky, really deeply unlucky, rather than anything else. It was a time when the then Conservative government was witch-hunting, as it were; was determined to stamp out what it regarded as this foul disease... It was a hell of a scandal at the time."

=== Role in LGBT history ===
Unlike the other defendants in the trial, Montagu continued to protest his innocence. The trial caused a backlash of opinion among some politicians and church leaders that led to the setting up of the Wolfenden Committee, which in its 1957 report recommended the decriminalisation of homosexual activity in private between two adults. Ten years later, Parliament finally carried out the recommendation, a huge turning point in gay history in Britain, where anal sex, a form of "buggery", had been a criminal offence ever since the Buggery Act 1533.

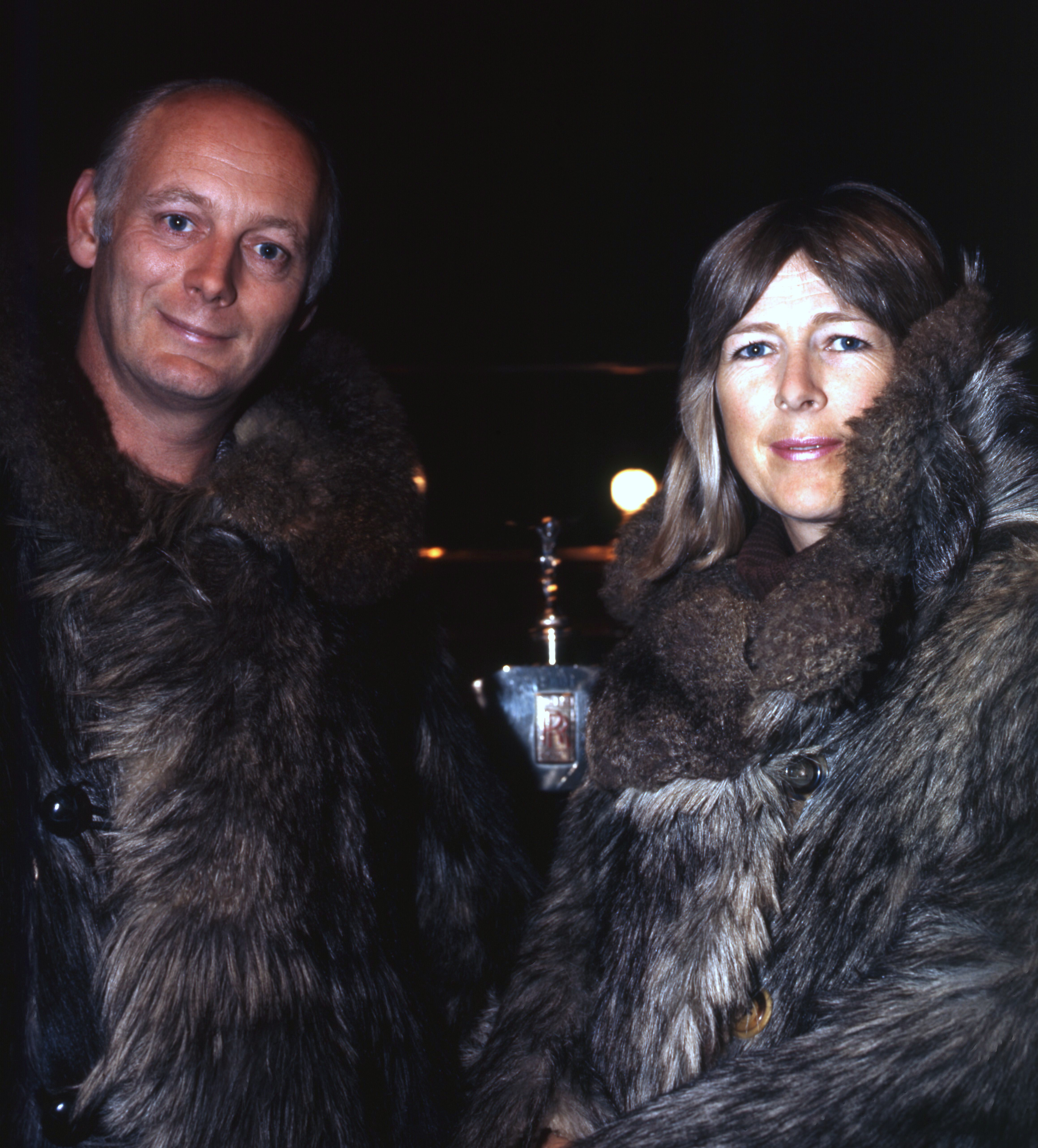
Lord Montagu of Beaulieu with his first wife, Belinda, whom he married in 1958

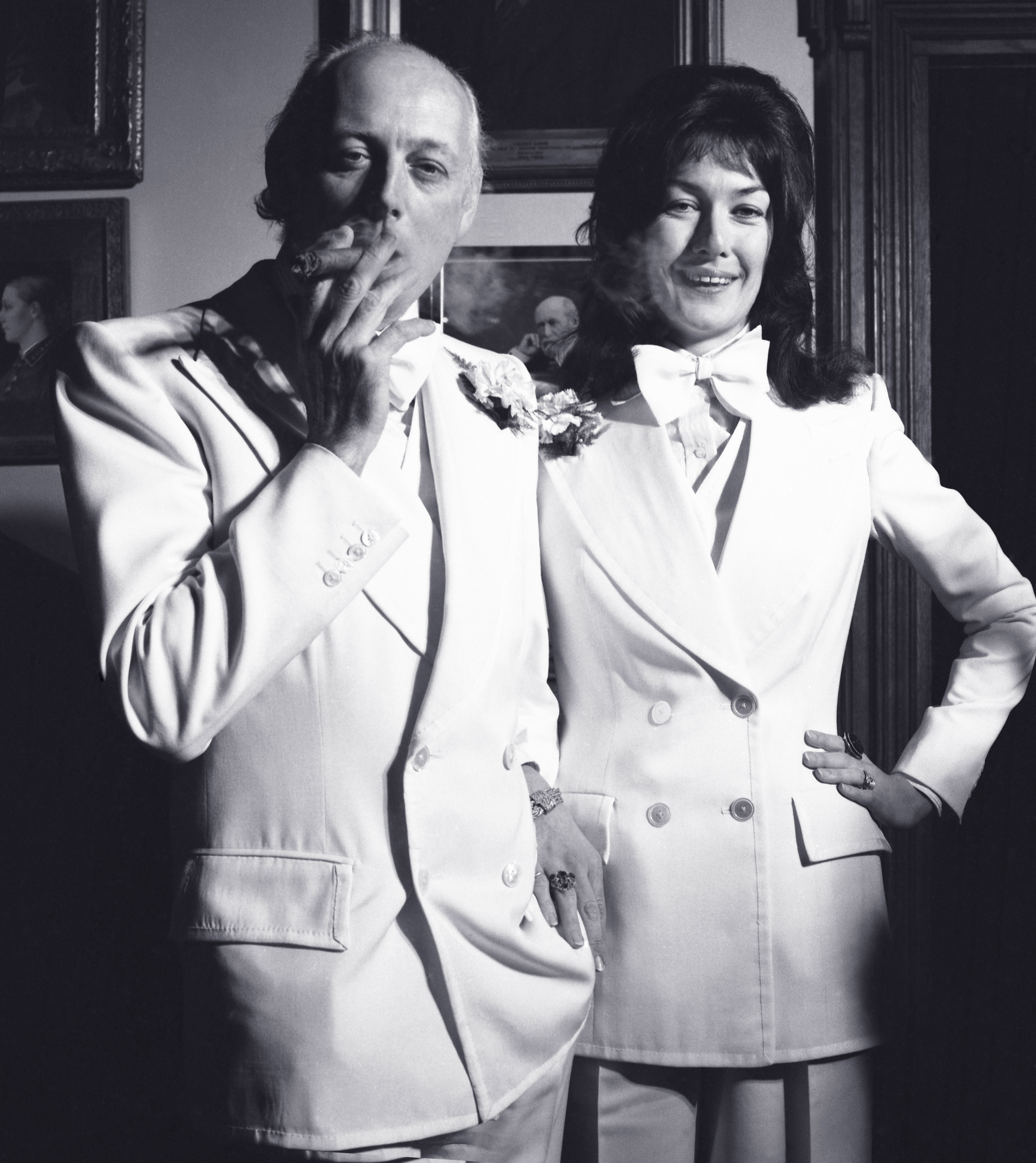
Lord Montagu of Beaulieu and his second wife, Fiona, on their wedding day in 1974, by Allan Warren

In an interview in 2000, coinciding with the publication of his autobiography, Montagu was reduced to tears at the suggestion that he would chiefly be remembered for his role in the decriminalisation of homosexuality. In a 2007 interview, when the issue was again raised, Montagu said, "I am slightly proud that the law has been changed to the benefit of so many people. I would like to think that I would get some credit for that. Maybe I'm being very boastful about it but I think because of the way we behaved and conducted our lives afterwards, because we didn't sell our stories, we just returned quietly to our lives, I think that had a big effect on public opinion."

== Personal life and death ==
In 1958, Lord Montagu of Beaulieu married Belinda Crossley (11 January 1932 – 15 December 2022), a granddaughter of the 1st Baron Somerleyton, by whom he had a son and a daughter before the couple divorced in 1974:

- Ralph Douglas-Scott-Montagu, 4th Baron Montagu of Beaulieu (born 13 March 1961)
- Hon. Mary Montagu-Scott (born 1964), married with issue to Rupert Scott (who took the surname Montagu-Scott, 4th son of Christopher Bartle Hugh Scott, 12th of Gala)

In 1974, he married his second wife, Fiona Margaret Herbert, with whom he had a son:

- Hon. Jonathan Deane Montagu-Scott (born 11 October 1975).

Fiona, Lady Montagu of Beaulieu, was born in about 1943 in Southern Rhodesia (now Zimbabwe), the daughter of Richard Leonard Deane Herbert, of Clymping, Sussex. She attended school in Switzerland, and following her education, she worked as film production assistant. She was a director of Beaulieu Enterprises and a trustee of the Countryside Education Trust. She served as an international advisor to the World Centre of Compassion for Children, led by Nobel Peace Laureate, Betty Williams, as well as a Trustee of Vision-in-Action, led by Yasuhiko Kimura. She additionally served on The World Wisdom Council, alongside Mikhail Gorbachev, former head of state of the Soviet Union. She was appointed the first global ambassador to the Club of Budapest.

Montagu died after a short illness, on 31 August 2015 at the age of 88, at his Beaulieu Estate in the New Forest. He was survived by his wife, his three children and two grandchildren. Fiona, Lady Montagu of Beaulieu died after a short illness on 14 May 2023, at the age of 79. At her inquest, it was found that Lady Montagu had contributed to her death by refusing food and drink.

== Memoirs and documentary film ==
For nearly half a century, Montagu steadfastly refused to speak publicly about the conviction, instead focusing his energies on the National Motor Museum and other activities. However, in 2000, he finally broke his silence with the publication of his memoirs, Wheels Within Wheels, of which two chapters are devoted to the story of his trial and imprisonment. In interviews, he has stated that by publishing his story, he wanted to "put the record straight", because he "felt it was important to get it accurate."

The story of Montagu's trial is told in a 2007 Channel 4 documentary, A Very British Sex Scandal, and the 2017 BBC drama-documentary Against The Law.

In April 2013, the Newport Beach Film Festival screened Lord Montagu, a documentary by Luke Korem on Montagu's life and accomplishments. The film was also shown at the Napa Valley Film Festival in November 2013.

== Bibliography ==
- Georgano, Nick, ed. (2001) [2000]. The Beaulieu encyclopedia of the automobile. Vol. 1–3. Foreward by Lord Montagu of Beaulieu. Chicago: Fitzroy Dearborn Publishers. ISBN 978-1-57958-293-7.
- Motagu of Beaulieu, Edward Douglas-Scott-Montagu (1967). The Gilt and the Gingerbread, or How to Live in a Stately Home and Make Money. Michael Joseph Ltd.
- Motagu of Beaulieu, Edward Douglas-Scott-Montagu (1974). Antique cars. Golden Press. ISBN 978-0-307-43121-9. OCLC 1494678.
- Montagu of Beaulieu, Edward Douglas-Scott-Montagu (2000). Wheels within wheels: an unconventional life. London: Weidenfeld & Nicolson. ISBN 0297817396.
- Rhodes, Anthony Richard Ewart (1970) [1969]. Louis Renault; a biography. Foreward by Lord Montagu of Beaulieu. New York: Harcourt, Brace & World.

Peerage of the United Kingdom
Preceded by John Douglas-Scott-Montagu	Baron Montagu of Beaulieu; 1929–2015; Member of the House of Lords (1947–1999)	Succeeded by Ralph Douglas-Scott-Montagu
Parliament of the United Kingdom
New office created by the House of Lords Act 1999	Elected hereditary peer to the House of Lords under the House of Lords Act 1999; 1999–2015	Next: The Lord Fairfax of Cameron
