= Ralph Douglas-Scott-Montagu, 4th Baron Montagu of Beaulieu =

British peer and owner of the Beaulieu Estate (born 1961)

The Right Honourable The Lord Montagu of Beaulieu
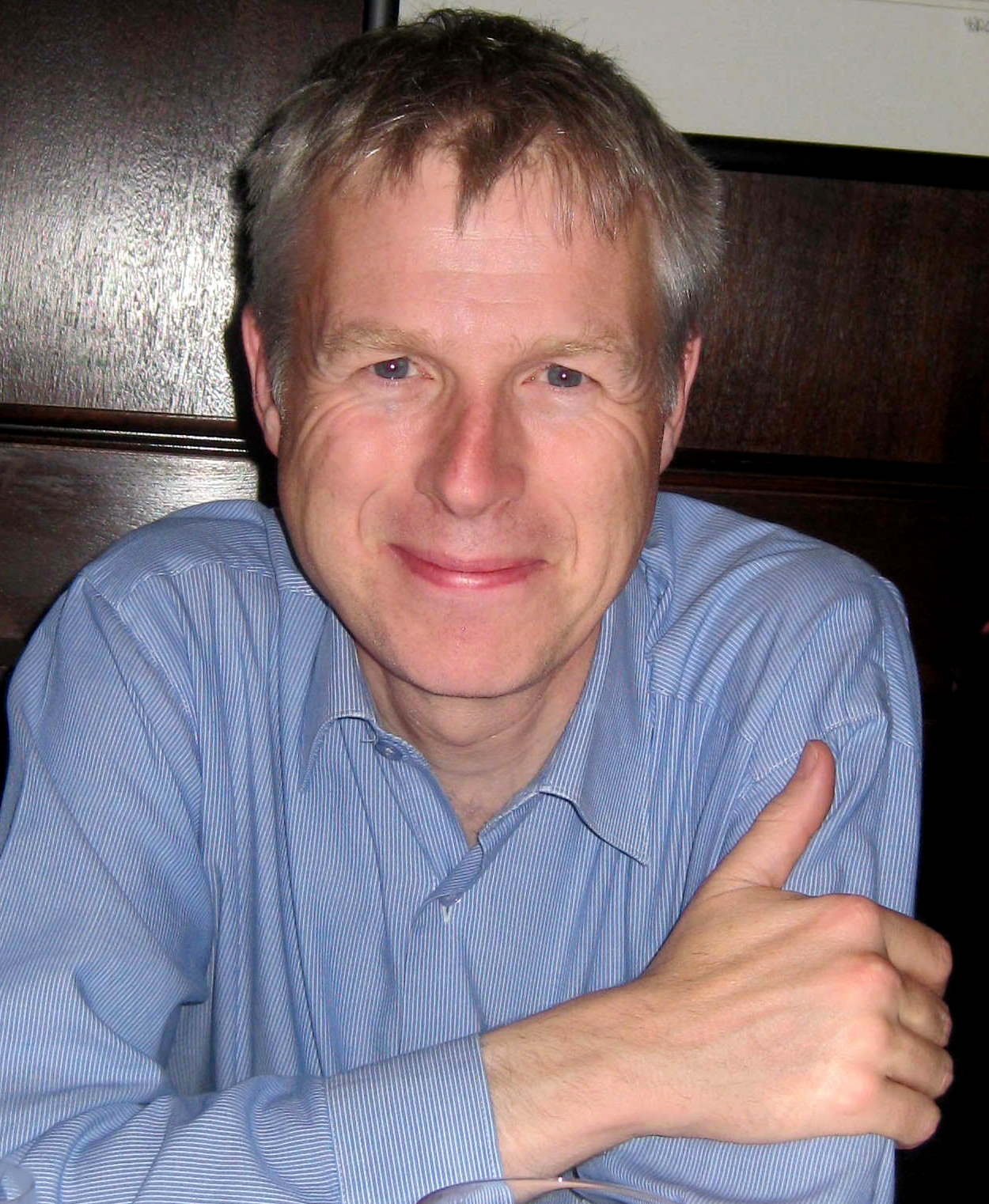
- Born: 13 March 1961 (age 65)
- Citizenship: United Kingdom
- Occupations: Graphic designer, Head of Heritage Radio
- Spouse: Ailsa Camm (m. 2005)
- Parent(s): The 3rd Baron Montagu of Beaulieu; Belinda Crossley
- Relatives: Mary Montagu-Scott (sister)

Ralph Douglas-Scott-Montagu, 4th Baron Montagu of Beaulieu (born 13 March 1961), is a British peer and owner of the Beaulieu Estate, home of the National Motor Museum.

== Early life and family ==
Lord Montagu is the son of Edward Douglas-Scott-Montagu, 3rd Baron Montagu of Beaulieu (1926–2015), and his first wife, Belinda, Lady Montagu, née Crossley (1932–2022). Montagu is the grandson of the 2nd Baron Montagu of Beaulieu (1866–1929) and his second wife, Alice Crake (1895–1996).

His parents divorced in 1974. In that same year his father married his second wife, Fiona Margaret Herbert (d. May 2023), with whom he had another son, Lord Montagu's half-brother, the Hon. Jonathan Douglas-Scott-Montagu (born 11 October 1975).

== Career ==
Montagu is a graphic designer and Head of Heritage at Radio Times. He is credited as a co-producer of Lord Montagu — a documentary about his father — and a series of short films about the stars of the TV comedy series Dad's Army.

He is the president of the Solent Protection Society, a governor of Walhampton School and a director of Beaulieu Enterprises Ltd. He also a trustee of the National Motor Museum Trust, the Countryside Education Trust and the Hampshire Archives Trust.

Concerned that local residents were being priced out, Montagu worked to secure social housing in the village of Beaulieu.

== Personal life ==
Montagu is married to Ailsa, Lady Montagu, née Camm. The couple have no children.

The heir presumptive to the barony is Lord Montagu's half-brother, Jonathan, a biochemist who is married to photographer Nathalie Daoust. Montagu is a descendant of King Charles II.

Peerage of the United Kingdom
Preceded by Edward Douglas-Scott-Montagu	Baron Montagu of Beaulieu; 2015–present	Incumbent; Heir presumptive: Hon. Jonathan Douglas-Scott-Montagu
