= G. N. Georgano =

British author (1932–2017)

Nick Georgano
- Nationality: (United Kingdom) British
- Born: George Nicolas Georgano; 29 February 1932 Britain
- Died: 22 October 2017 (aged 85) Guernsey

George Nicolas Georgano (29 February 1932 – 22 October 2017), often referred to as Nick Georgano, was a British author, specialising in motoring history. His most notable work is The Complete Encyclopedia of Motorcars, first published in 1968.

== Early life and education ==
Georgano was born in London in 1932. At the age of 7 he was compiling a truck catalogue, and at that of 16, an encyclopaedia. He went to Bryanston School and then graduated from New College, Oxford, with a diploma in teaching.

== Career ==
After college, he took up a career in teaching, his first position being at an English preparatory school.

He was a teacher at Trent college in Long Eaton Notts.

Georgano's first full publication was The World's Automobiles which he co-authored with Ralph Doyle (George Ralph Doyle 1890–1961). This was followed by The Complete Encyclopedia of Motorcars which was published in 1968.

From 1976 to 1981 Georgano worked at the National Motor Museum as Head Librarian.

== Death ==
On 22 October 2017, Georgano died on the birthday of one of his grandsons, Harry Northmore.

== Awards ==
Georgano was awarded the Thomas McKean Memorial Cup of the Antique Automobile Club of America.

He was presented with the Veteran and Vintage Magazine Trophy by Edward Douglas-Scott-Montagu, 3rd Baron Montagu of Beaulieu for The Complete Encyclopedia of Motorcars.

He received the Montagu Trophy of the Guild of Motoring Writers for two of his works: Britain's Motor Industry: The First 100 Years and The Complete Encyclopedia of Motorcars.

Georgano was a Trustee of the Michael Sedgwick Memorial Trust; a member of the National Motor Museum Advisory Council; and Trustee of the Horseless Carriage Foundation, California.

== Publications ==
Georgano is the author of 33 reference books.

- Georgano, G. N. (1992). The American Automobile: A Centenary. Prion. ISBN 1853752363.
- ——. The Art of the American Automobile – The Greatest Stylists and Their Work.
- —— (1981). American Trucks of the Seventies. Penguin Books. ISBN 0-7232-2765-9.
- ——. Auto's uit de jaren zeventig en tachtig.
- —— (2000). The Beaulieu Encyclopedia of the Automobile (3 volume set ed.). Fitzroy Dearborn Publishers. ISBN 1-57958-293-1.
- —— (2001). The Beaulieu Encyclopedia of the Automobile: Coachbuilding. Taylor & Francis Group. ISBN 1-57958-367-9.
- —— (1993). The Bentley. Shire Album. Shire Books.
- Georgano, G. N. (ed.). Britain's Motor Industry: The First 100 Years.
- —— (1978). Brooklands: A Pictorial History. Dalton Watson Fine Books. ISBN 0-901564-15-X.
- —— (1985). Cars: 1886–1930. Random House Value Publishing. ISBN 0-517-48073-5.
- —— (2001). Cars 1930–2000: The Birth of the Modern Car. New Line Books. ISBN 1-57717-210-8.
- —— (2002). Cars 1990 to Present Days: Production Goes World Wide. Mason Crest Publishers. ISBN 1-59084-489-0.
- —— (October 2002). "Cars of the Fifties: Goodbye Seller's Market". World of Wheels.
- —— (2002). Cars of the Seventies and Eighties: Hatchbacks for the Sportsman. Mason Crest Publishers. ISBN 1-59084-488-2.
- —— (1977). Classic Cars (Source Book). Sourcebooks.
- —— (1985). The Classic Rolls-Royce. Octopus Publishing Group. ISBN 0-600-50020-9.
- ——. Classic Rolls-Royce (Spanish ed.).
- Georgano, G. N., ed. (1979). The Complete Encyclopedia of Commercial Vehicles. Krause Publications. ISBN 0-87341-024-6.
- —— (1968). The Complete Encyclopedia of Motorcars.
  - Georgano, G. N.; Andersen, Thorkil Ry (1973). The Complete Encyclopedia of Motorcars, 1885 to the Present. Dutton Books. ISBN 0-525-08351-0.
  - —— (1973). The Complete Encyclopedia of Motorcars, 1885 to the Present. Random House. ISBN 0-85223-048-6.
  - —— (1973). The Complete Encyclopedia of Motorcars, 1885–1968. Penguin Group USA. ISBN 0-525-08350-2.
- —— (2002). Early and Vintage Years, 1885–1930: The Golden Era of Coachbuilding. Mason Crest Publishers. ISBN 1-59084-491-2.
- Lord Montagu of Beaulieu; Georgano, G. N. Early Days on the Road (with Lord Montagu of Beaulieu).
  - Early Days on the Road – An Illustrated History 1819–1941. 1967.
  - Early Days on the Road: An illustrated history 1819–1941. 1976.
  - Early Days on the Road: An Illustrated History 1819–1941. Penguin Books. 1976. ISBN 0-7181-1310-1.
- ——. Electric Vehicles. Shire Library. Shire Books.
- Georgano, G. N.; Baechler, Glenn (1971). Encyclopedia of American Automobiles. Dutton. ISBN 0-525-09792-9.
- Georgano, G. N. (ed.). The Encyclopedia of Motor Sport.
- —— (1971). The Encyclopedia of M: 2 (A Studio book). Penguin Books. ISBN 0-670-29405-5.
- Georgano, G. N.; Baechler, Glenn (1971). The Encyclopedia of Motor Sport. Penguin Books. ISBN 0-7181-0955-4.
- —— (1998). The Encyclopedia of Sportscars. Chartwell Books. ISBN 0-7858-0859-0.
- —— (1978). Histoire Illustree des Camions. 1896–1920. Carlo Demand.
- —— (1970). A History of Sports Cars. Nelson. ISBN 1-71212-005-0.
- —— (1972). A History of the London Taxicab. David & Charles. ISBN 0-7153-5687-9.
  - ——. A History of the London Taxicab. Drake Publishers. ISBN 0-87749-352-9.
- —— (1972). A History of Transport. Dent & Sons, J. M. ISBN 0-460-03951-2.
- Georgano, G. N.; Davies, Gordon (1976). The How and Why Wonder Book of the Motor Car.
- —— (1990). The Humber. Shire Album. Shire Books.
- —— (1985). The London Taxi. Shire Publications. ISBN 0-85263-772-1.
- —— (January 1994). Military Vehicles: World War Two Transport and Halftracks. Osprey Publishing. ISBN 1-85532-406-7.
- —— (1976). A Motor Racing Camera, 1894–1916. National Motor Museum Trust. David & Charles. ISBN 0-7153-7160-6.
- —— (1982). The New Encyclopedia of Motorcars: 1885 to the Present. Penguin Group USA. ISBN 0-525-93254-2.
- ——. Racing and Sports Cars. Piccolo Books.
- —— (1983). Rolls Royce.
- ——. Rolls Royce-Classic Cars.
- —— (1997). Scammell: The Load Movers from Watford. Roundoak Publishing. ISBN 187156526X.
- —— (1977). A Source Book of Classic Cars. Ward Lock. ISBN 0-7063-5039-1.
- —— (1973). A Source Book of Racing and Sports Cars. Ward Lock. ISBN 0-7063-1495-6.
- —— (1974). A Source Book of Veteran Cars. Ward Lock. ISBN 0-7063-1820-X.
- —— (1998). Sports Cars: History and Development. Book Sales. ISBN 91-87036-10-X.
- —— (1972). Transportation through the Ages. McGraw-Hill. ISBN 0-07-023131-1.
- Georgano, G. N.; Demand, C. (1979). Trucks: An Illustrated History 1896–1920.
- —— (1974). Veteran Cars (Source Book).
- —— (1974). Vintage and Post-vintage Cars (Source Book).
- —— (1998). Vintage Cars 1886 to 1930. Book Sales, Incorporated. ISBN 0-7858-0933-3.
  - —— (1997). Vintage Cars 1886 to 1930 (More editions ed.). Random House. ISBN 1-85501-926-4.
- —— (2002). Vintage Years, 1920–1930: Mass Production and the Great Boom of Wheels. Mason Crest Publishers. ISBN 1-59084-490-4.
- ——; Sedgwick, Michael C.; Laban, Brian (1987). The World Guide to Automobiles. Baldwin.
- Doyle, G. R.; Georgano, G. N. (1957). The World's Automobiles 1880–1958: A Record of 75 Years of Car Building.
- Doyle, G. R.; Georgano, G. N. (1963). The World's Automobiles 1862–1962, A Record of 100 Years of Car Building by & G. N. Georgano (1963).
- —— (1965). The World's Commercial Vehicles, 1830–1964: A record of 134 years of commercial vehicle production.
- —— (1987). World Guide to Automobile Manufacturers. Facts on File. ISBN 0-8160-1844-8.
- —— (1983). World Truck Book.
- —— (1983). World Truck Handbook. Jane's Information Group. ISBN 0-7106-0267-7.
- —— (1994). World War Two Military Vehicles. Osprey. ISBN 1855324067.
