= Belinda Douglas-Scott-Montagu, Baroness Montagu of Beaulieu =

British embroiderer (1932–2022)

Belinda, Lady Montagu of Beaulieu
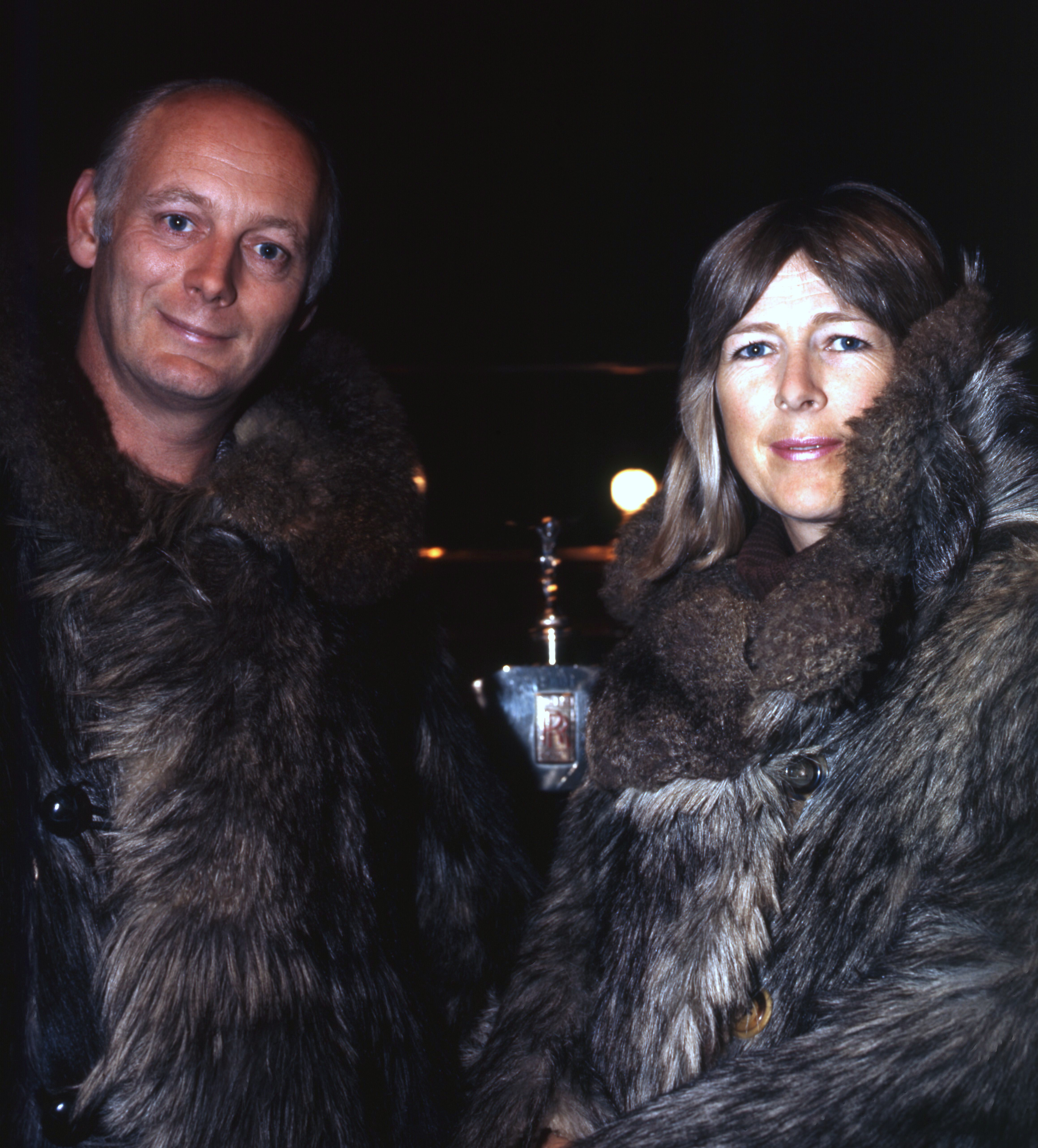
- Lord and Lady Montagu of Beaulieu in 1972, by Allan Warren
- Born: Elizabeth Belinda Crossley; 11 January 1932
- Died: 15 December 2022 (aged 90)
- Spouse: The 3rd Baron Montagu of Beaulieu (m. 1958; div. 1974)
- Children: The 4th Baron Montagu of Beaulieu; Mary Montagu-Scott
- Relatives: The 1st Baron Somerleyton (grandfather)

Elizabeth Belinda Douglas-Scott-Montagu, Baroness Montagu of Beaulieu (née Crossley; 11 January 1932 – 15 December 2022), was a British embroiderer and the wife of The 3rd Baron Montagu of Beaulieu, from 1958 until their divorce in 1974.

== Early life ==
Belinda Crossley was born to Captain Hon. John Crossley and his second wife, the former Sybelle Drummond. Her father was the younger son of The 1st Baron Somerleyton. In 1935, her father's older brother, Francis Savile Crossley, succeeded her grandfather as the Baron Somerleyton. Her first cousin, Savile William Francis Crossley, was the 3rd Baron Somerleyton from 1959 until his death in 2012.

== Personal life ==
Crossley married Edward Douglas-Scott-Montagu, 3rd Baron Montagu of Beaulieu, in 1958. The couple's children:

- Hon. Ralph Douglas-Scott-Montagu (b. 1961), the 4th Baron since August 2015
- Hon. Mary Montagu-Scott (b. 1964)

Lord and Lady Montagu of Beaulieu divorced in 1974.

Beaulieu Abbey houses the former Baroness Montagu of Beaulieu's wall hangings which depict the abbey's history. She was the patron of the New Forest Association and was commissioned in 1979 to work on The New Forest Embroidery, in commemoration of the 900th anniversary of the creation of the New Forest.

Belinda, Lady Montagu of Beaulieu, died on 15 December 2022, at the age of 90.

== See also ==
- Edward Douglas-Scott-Montagu, 3rd Baron Montagu of Beaulieu
- Ralph Douglas-Scott-Montagu, 4th Baron Montagu of Beaulieu
- Beaulieu Abbey
