= Jeremy Howard-Williams =

Second World War fighter pilot (1922–1995)

Jeremy Napier Howard-Williams
- Born: 13 March 1922
- Died: 8 September 1995 (aged 73); Warsash, Hampshire, England
- Military career
- Allegiance: United Kingdom
- Branch: Royal Air Force
- Rank: Flight Lieutenant (acting Squadron Leader)
- Units: No. 604 Squadron RAF; Fighter Interception Unit
- Awards: Distinguished Flying Cross
- Other work: Publisher and writer

Jeremy Napier Howard-Williams D.F.C. (13 March 1922 – 8 September 1995) was a Second World War fighter pilot who later wrote several books including what became the "classic account of the sail-maker's art".

== Family and education ==
Howard-Williams was the son of Air Commodore Ernest Leslie Howard-Williams, an officer in the Royal Air Force, and Norah Christabel Gibson. He was educated at Hordle House School at Milford on Sea, Hampshire and then at Felsted in Essex and the Institut de Touraine at Tours, France.

On 29 September 1951, he married Diana Gillian "Jill" Inglis (born 15 June 1931), the daughter of Air Vice-Marshal Frank Inglis (1899–1969) who was the Head of RAF Intelligence Staff reporting to Churchill during the War. They had three children:

- Anthony Inglis (born 27 June 1952), who became a highly successful music conductor.
- Christopher (born 22 March 1954), who became a teacher and later was Director of Human Resources at Damart International.
- Nicola (born 10 January 1957), who runs the Youth Ballet Ensemble in Freiburg, Germany

== Military career ==
In 1940, he joined the Local Defence Volunteers, fore-runners of the Home Guard, before volunteering for the RAF. In September 1941, he became a Pilot Officer, serving in No. 604 Squadron, known as the night fighter squadron, based at Middle Wallop, under the command of Group Captain John "Cat's Eyes" Cunningham, flying Bristol Beaufighters.

After a tour of operations with the squadron, he joined the Fighter Interception Unit, which made use of the RAF's early experiments with radar, testing the products of the electronic laboratories in combat. In the development unit, he flew in British (Mosquito and Tempest), American (Black Widow), and captured German (Messerschmitt Me 410) aircraft and used all types of airborne radar.

He achieved the rank of Flight Lieutenant, although he acted as Squadron Leader. At the end of the war he was awarded the Distinguished Flying Cross for gallantry. The citation read:

This officer has completed a very large number of sorties and throughout has set a fine example of keenness and devotion to duty. He has shot down at least two enemy aircraft, whilst in attacks on targets on the ground he has most effectively attacked numerous locomotives and mechanical vehicles. His resolute work has won great praise.

After the war he served in Singapore, Germany and finally as Assistant Air Attaché to the British Embassy in Paris.

== Sail maker ==
Howard-Williams was a keen sailor and sailed for the R.A.F. On leaving the R.A.F., he went to work for sail-makers Ratsey & Lapthorn, based at Cowes on the Isle of Wight. During his time with Ratsey, he gained the material for his first book, Teach Your Child about Sailing which was published in 1963.

He was a regular sailor, racing in dragons in the Solent, but was a poor swimmer. He invented the first all-in-one sailing jacket which included many features now accepted as standard including whistle, harness etc. He also invented the Solent tide calculator, which gives the currents at any time of day.

In 1967, he published Sails; illustrated by drawings and photographs, the book detailed not only how sails and spars work but also how to extract the most speed from them, and has been described as the "classic account of the sail-maker's art". The book became a best seller and has been reprinted several times and translated into at least six languages.

== Publisher ==
After publishing several other books, in 1974 he was appointed managing editor of his publishing house, Adlard Coles, based at St. Albans. He remained with Adlard Coles for eight years, during which time his "efficiency, relentless insistence on other people doing their jobs, perspicacity and concern for people" transformed the company.

In 1976, he published Night Intruder: A Personal Account of the Radar War between the RAF and Luftwaffe Nightfighter Forces, in which he details his time with the Fighter Interception Unit describing how to fly and navigate a Mosquito, and his missions against the German night fighter airfields. The book also explains how radar altered the air combat environment in the Second World War.

He retired in 1982 to live at Warsash, near Southampton, where he wrote The Complete Crossword Companion, which remains in print and was his biggest earner.

He died at Warsash on 8 September 1995. In his obituary he was described as

Warmhearted, energetic, and fiercely loyal to the causes in life that he admired, punctiliously good-mannered . . . he will be remembered with affection and respect in the many circles into which his life took him.

His ashes were scattered on the Solent.

== Works ==
Amongst the works written or edited by Jeremy Howard-Williams are:

- "Teach Your Child about Sailing" 1963
- "Sails" 1967
- "Racing Dinghy Sails" 1971
- "Crewing for Offshore Racing" 1973
- "Night Intruder: A Personal Account of the Radar War between the RAF and Luftwaffe Nightfighter Forces" 1976
- "Care and Repair of Sails" 1976
- "Practical Pilotage" 1977
- "Offshore Crew" 1979
- "The Complete Crossword Companion" 1984
- "The Complete Cryptic Crossword Companion" 1985
- "Small Boat Sails" 1987
- "Canvas Work" 1989
