= Anthony Inglis (conductor) =

British conductor (born 1952)

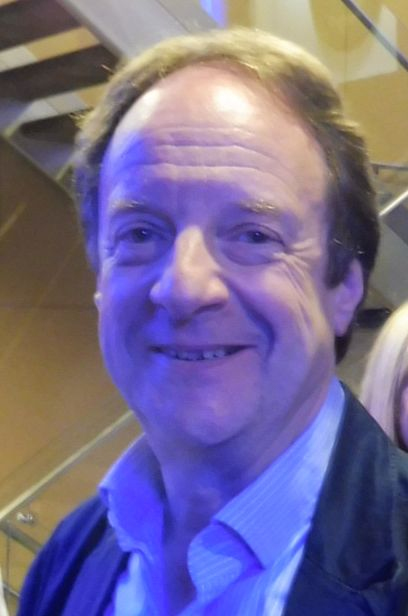
- Anthony Inglis, 2018
- Born: Anthony Inglis Howard-Williams; 27 June 1952 (age 74)
- Occupation: Conductor
- Spouse: Jan Inglis
- Children: 3
- Father: Jeremy Howard-Williams
- Relatives: Frank Inglis (maternal grandfather)
- Website: anthonyinglis.com

Anthony Inglis (born 27 June 1952) is a British conductor.

== Early years ==
Inglis was born Anthony Inglis Howard-Williams. He changed his name to avoid a clash: Howard Williams (no hyphen) was conducting Swan Lake for The Royal Ballet and he conducted Swan Lake with the Sadler's Wells Royal Ballet at the same time.

He was born into an RAF family. His father was Squadron-Leader Jeremy Howard-Williams DFC, who was a night fighter pilot during World War II before joining Fighter Interception Unit. His paternal grandfather, Air Commodore E. L. Howard-Williams was a major in the army, before joining the fledgling Royal Flying Corps, the precursor to the RAF. His uncle, Wing Commander Peter Howard-Williams DFC was in 19 Squadron flying out of Duxford during 1940 and flew in The Battle of Britain, and therefore was one of The Few.

His maternal grandfather was Air Vice-Marshal F. F. Inglis CB CBE and head of RAF Intelligence during World War II and on Adolf Hitler's hit list. He was sent to America by Winston Churchill where he persuaded President Franklin D. Roosevelt to direct the American war against Germany rather than Japan.

Anthony is directly descended from Robert Napier of the Napier-Railton cars.

== Education ==
He was first educated at Freston Lodge School in Sevenoaks, where at the age of 6 he first conducted. On leaving Freston Lodge he boarded at Hordle House on the south coast of England in the village of Milford on Sea. On leaving there he gained a scholarship to Marlborough College in Wiltshire. Academically, he was not gifted and he left before failing his A Levels (having achieved four O Levels including music) and entered the Royal College of Music at an early age.

== Early career ==
On leaving the college, he did a number of music jobs which included being on the music staff for some of Ken Russell's films: Lisztomania and Mahler, plus singing on the cult film The Wicker Man; his is the high tenor heard in the pub scene. He played piano in the West End of London working his way up to being the music director for shows such as My Fair Lady with Anna Neagle and Tony Britton directed by the lyricist of the show Alan Jay Lerner; Oliver! with Ron Moody, the last time he reprised his role; The Two Ronnies with Barker and Corbett; and Irene with Jon Pertwee. Having conducted a season at the London Palladium he decided to pursue his original career: that of a classical conductor.

== Career ==
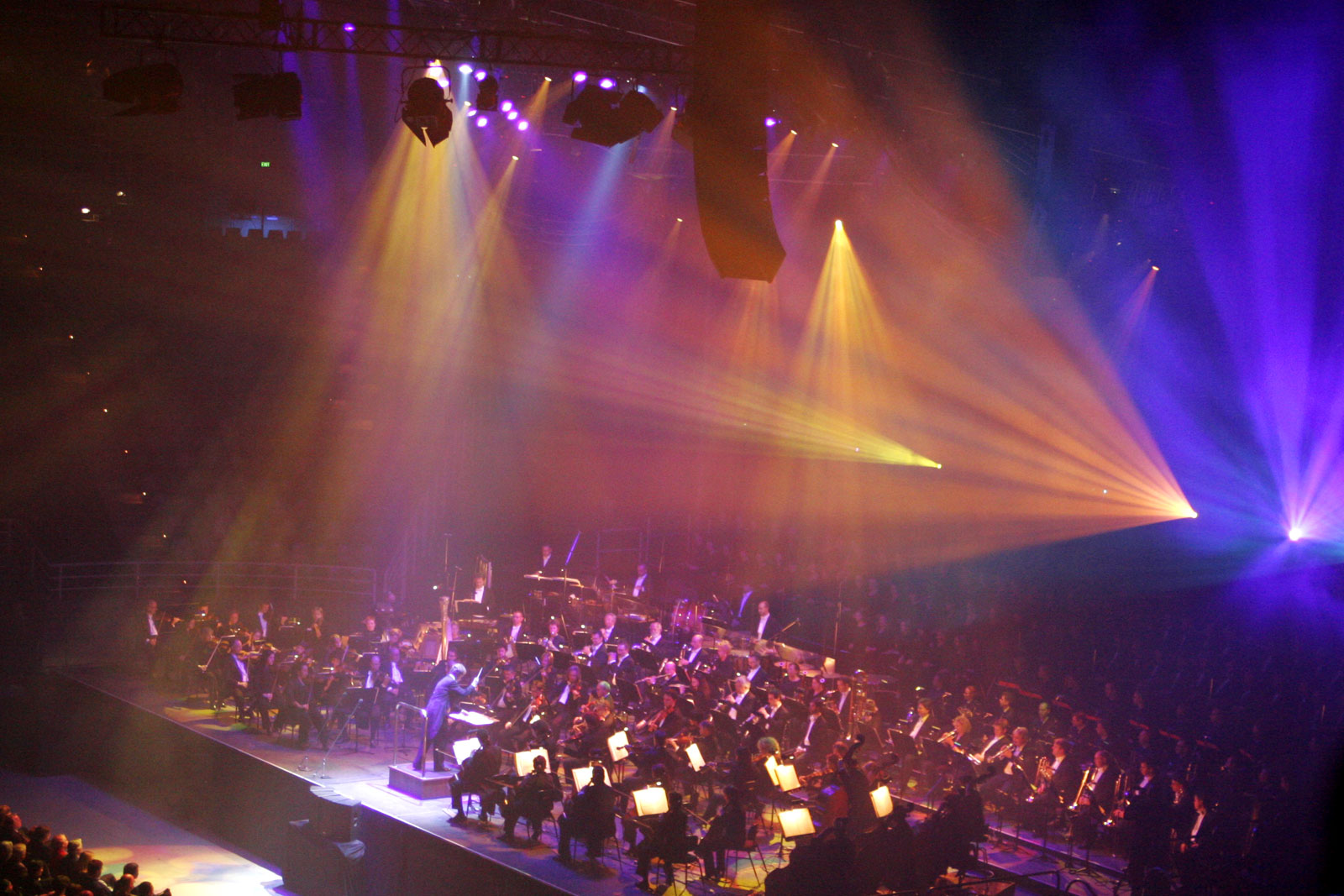
Inglis conducting the Melbourne Symphony Orchestra at the 2005 Melbourne Classical Spectacular

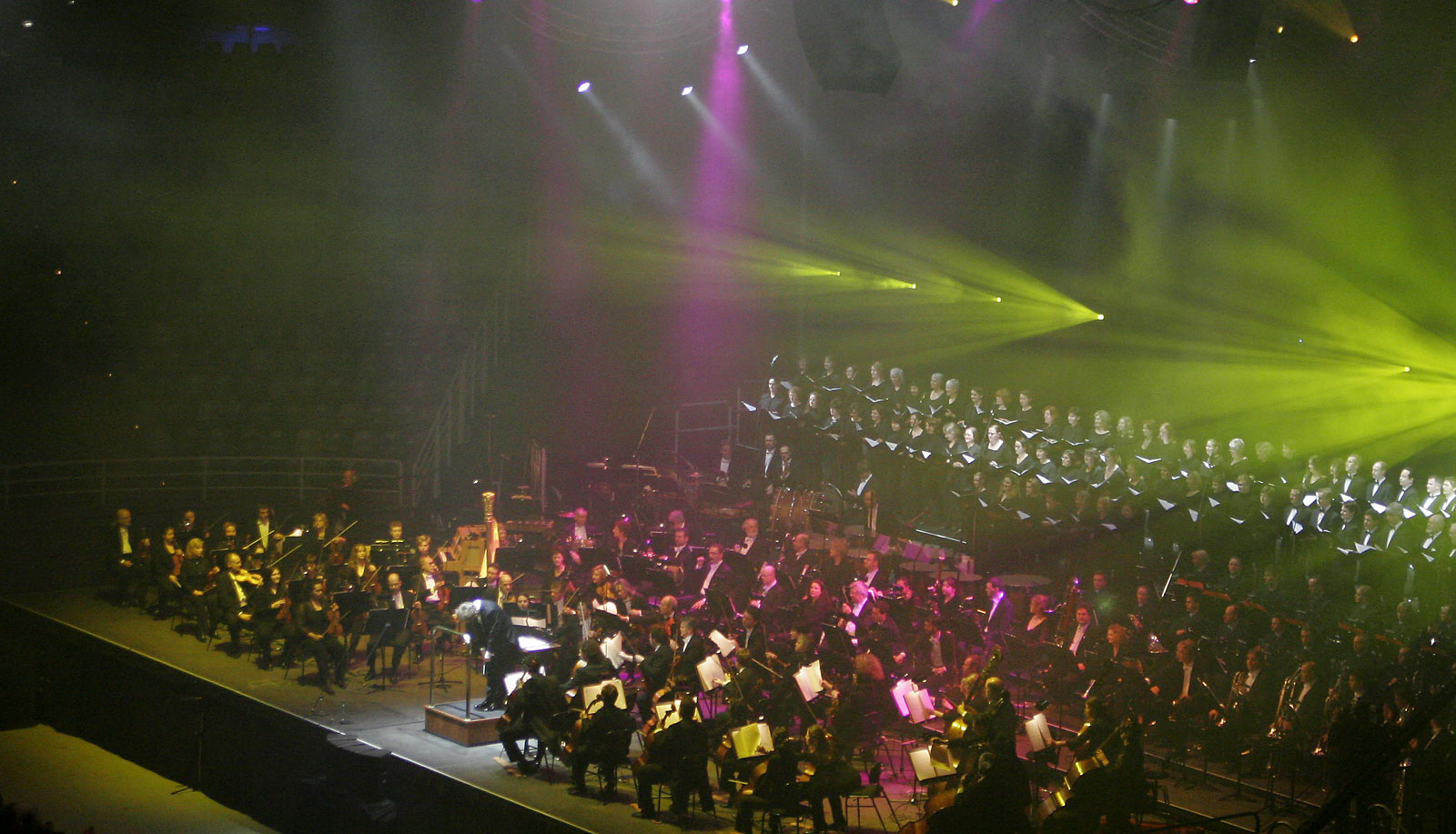
Inglis taking a bow

He has been described as "one of Britain's most popular conductors" and leads a busy international conducting career, appearing with some of the greatest orchestras in concert halls from Sydney via Tokyo, to the Concertgebouw in Amsterdam, and recording studios around the world. These include the four main London independent orchestras: London Symphony Orchestra, Royal Philharmonic Orchestra, London Philharmonic Orchestra and Philharmonia Orchestra, all the British independent and most BBC orchestras, the Melbourne Symphony Orchestra, Adelaide Symphony Orchestra, Sydney Symphony Orchestra, Gothenburg Symphony Orchestra, Singapore Symphony Orchestra, and the Warsaw Philharmonic Orchestra, Malaysian Philharmonic Orchestra and Israel Philharmonic Orchestra. He is currently music director of the National Symphony Orchestra in London, the Welsh mezzo-soprano Katherine Jenkins and is music consultant for The Phantom of the Opera at Her Majesty's Theatre. For 15 years he was well known in the UK for his conducting of Classical Spectacular, and in Japan, his series of contemporary anime recordings with the Warsaw Philharmonic regularly featured in the top classical 10. In the world of opera, he has conducted at the Gothenburg opera house. In ballet, he has conducted all three Tchaikovsky ballets for Birmingham Royal Ballet and English National Ballet, and he has been featured more times at London's Royal Albert Hall than anyone else in the building's history.

== Royal connections ==
He has conducted six royal concerts: a dance gala with the Royal Ballet Sinfonia in the presence of Diana, Princess of Wales, two concerts with the Royal Philharmonic in the presence of the Queen and the Duke of Edinburgh celebrating the 50th anniversary of the Battle of Britain and the naming ceremony for the world's largest liner, the RMS Queen Mary 2; and two with the London Philharmonic in the presence of the Prince of Wales in aid of farmers and the naming ceremony for Cunard Line's liner, the MS Queen Victoria. The sixth was for the naming ceremony of the newest Cunard liner the MS Queen Elizabeth in the presence of the Queen.

== Recordings ==
His studio, TV and concert recordings have been broadcast in the UK, Australia, Scandinavia, Europe and the Far East. He has made recent DVD recordings with the Melbourne Symphony Orchestra, and two with Katherine Jenkins and the National Symphony plus CD recordings with: London Symphony (1993 Grammy nominated), London Philharmonic, Royal Philharmonic Orchestra (RPO), Philharmonia, Israel Philharmonic, Warsaw Philharmonic, London Mozart Players, Slovak Philharmonic, Orchestra dell'Accademia Nazionale di Santa Cecilia (Rome), Bournemouth Symphony, Cracow Radio Symphony, Hong Kong Sinfonietta, Prague Sinfonia, Netherlands Radio Symphony. In 2005 he conducted the RPO at the largest regular live TV show in Europe called Wetten, dass..?.

== Personal life ==
Inglis is married and lives by the River Thames in SW London with his wife Jan and three children. Jan's early career was in theatre, performing in the West End, before spending a number of seasons in Stratford and London as a member of the Royal Shakespeare Company. On starting a family, she retired from the theatre and worked in the education sector. After completing her BA in Education Studies at King's College London, Jan established her own tutoring business.
