= Rupert Goodman =

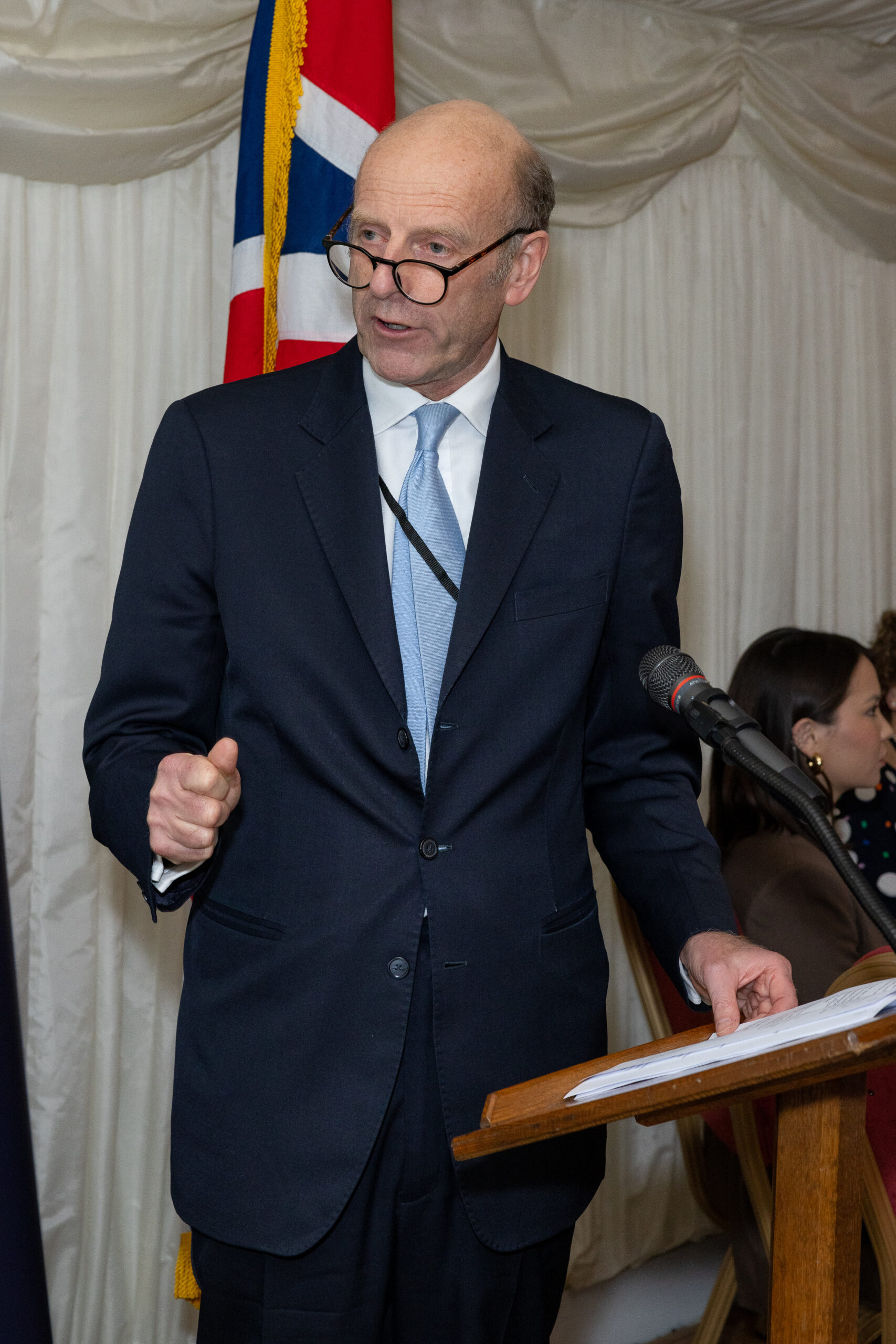

Rupert Andrew Woodward Goodman, OBE DL FRGS (born 17 April 1963) is a British publisher, international affairs expert and entrepreneur.

== Life and career ==
Goodman was born in Kidderminster. He was educated at Walhampton School, Eton College and Trinity College, Cambridge where he represented the university in the Varsity Athletics Match as a hurdler. He was also Secretary of the Pitt Club. After graduating from Cambridge, Goodman worked at J. Walter Thompson in London. In 1984 he founded FIRST, a multi-disciplinary international affairs organisation, he is currently chairman of FIRST. FIRST received the Queen's Award for Enterprise in 2010 and 2013, for excellence in international markets.

Goodman was elected a Fellow of the Royal Geographical Society in 1992. In 2000 he founded the Responsible Capitalism Initiative and Annual Award to honour business leaders who have excelled in both commercial success and social responsibility.

He is a founding trustee and chairman of the British-Kazakh Society, and a founding director of Equilibrium. He is the chairman of World Petroleum, Global Energy and World Energy Insight. He was elected a founding director of NewWaveSolutions, a subsidiary of DEME, in 2016 and was appointed Chairman of the Thai-United Kingdom Business Council in 2019.

He was a Trustee of the National Botanic Garden of Wales between 2005 and 2008.

In 2012 Goodman was appointed a Deputy Lieutenant of Greater London. He is also the recipient of a London Metropolitan Police Commissioner's Commendation and received a High Sheriff of Greater London Award for bravery in 2011. Goodman is a Freeman of the City of London.

Goodman is a Vice President of Flora and Fauna International and a member of the development board of Artes Mundi.

In 2016 Goodman was appointed the first Deputy Chairman and a Trustee of Prince's Trust International, now The King's Trust International. He was appointed as Ambassador to the King's Trust International in 2022. He served as Vice Chair of The King's Trust International 10th Anniversary Committee in 2025.

Goodman was appointed Officer of the Order of the British Empire (OBE) in the 2025 New Years Honours for services to the promotion of trade and investment and to UK interests overseas.

== Bibliography ==
Goodman has co-edited and written a number of books, including:

- The Critical Decade (2003)
- The 21st Century: A view from the South (2005)
- Responsible Capitalism I (2009)
- Britain's Foreign Policy in a Networked World (2011)
- Nursultan Nazarbayev, Leadership Perspectives (2015)
- South to the Great Steppe (2015)
- Responsible Capitalism II (2017)
- Bahrain: Celebrating 200 Years Together (2017)
- Britain and Bahrain: A Celebration of Friendship (2018)
- Two Decades of Leadership: His Majesty King Hamad bin Isa Al Khalifa (2019)
- Father of the Nation; First President Nursultan Nazarbayev (2020)
