= Beaulieu Palace House =

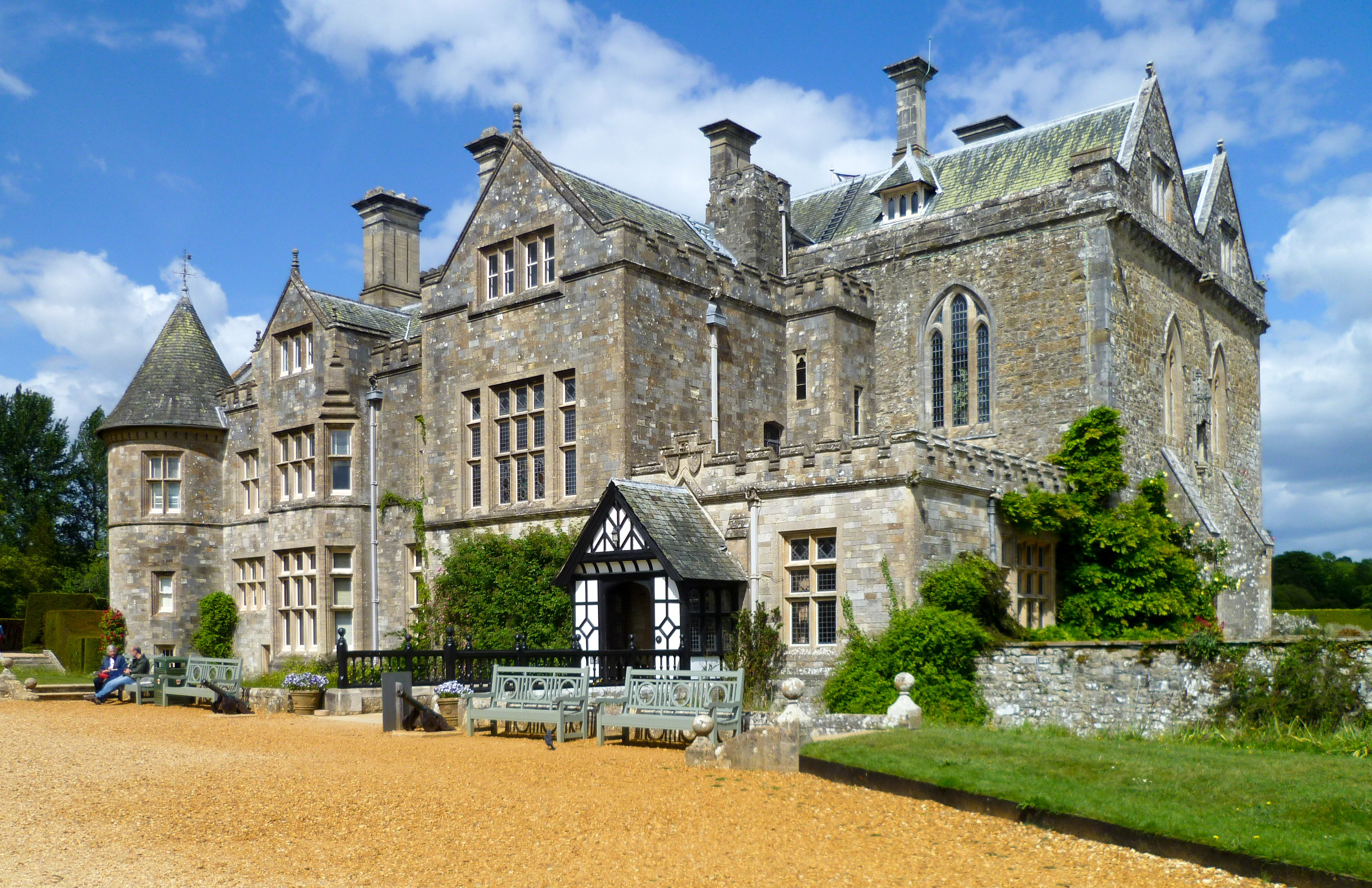
- Beaulieu Palace House in 2011

- Location within Hampshire

General information
- Type: Country house
- Location: Beaulieu, Hampshire
- Coordinates: 50°49′13″N 1°27′5″W
- Completed: 13th century

Listed Building – Grade I
- Official name: Palace House
- Designated: 8 October 1959
- Reference no.: 1094430

Beaulieu Palace House (/ˈbjuːli/ BEW-lee) is a 13th-century house in Beaulieu, Hampshire, United Kingdom. Originally part of Beaulieu Abbey, the estate was bought in 1538 by Thomas Wriothesley, 1st Earl of Southampton, following the Dissolution of the Monasteries. It is still owned and occupied by the earl's descendants, the Barons Montagu of Beaulieu.

== History ==
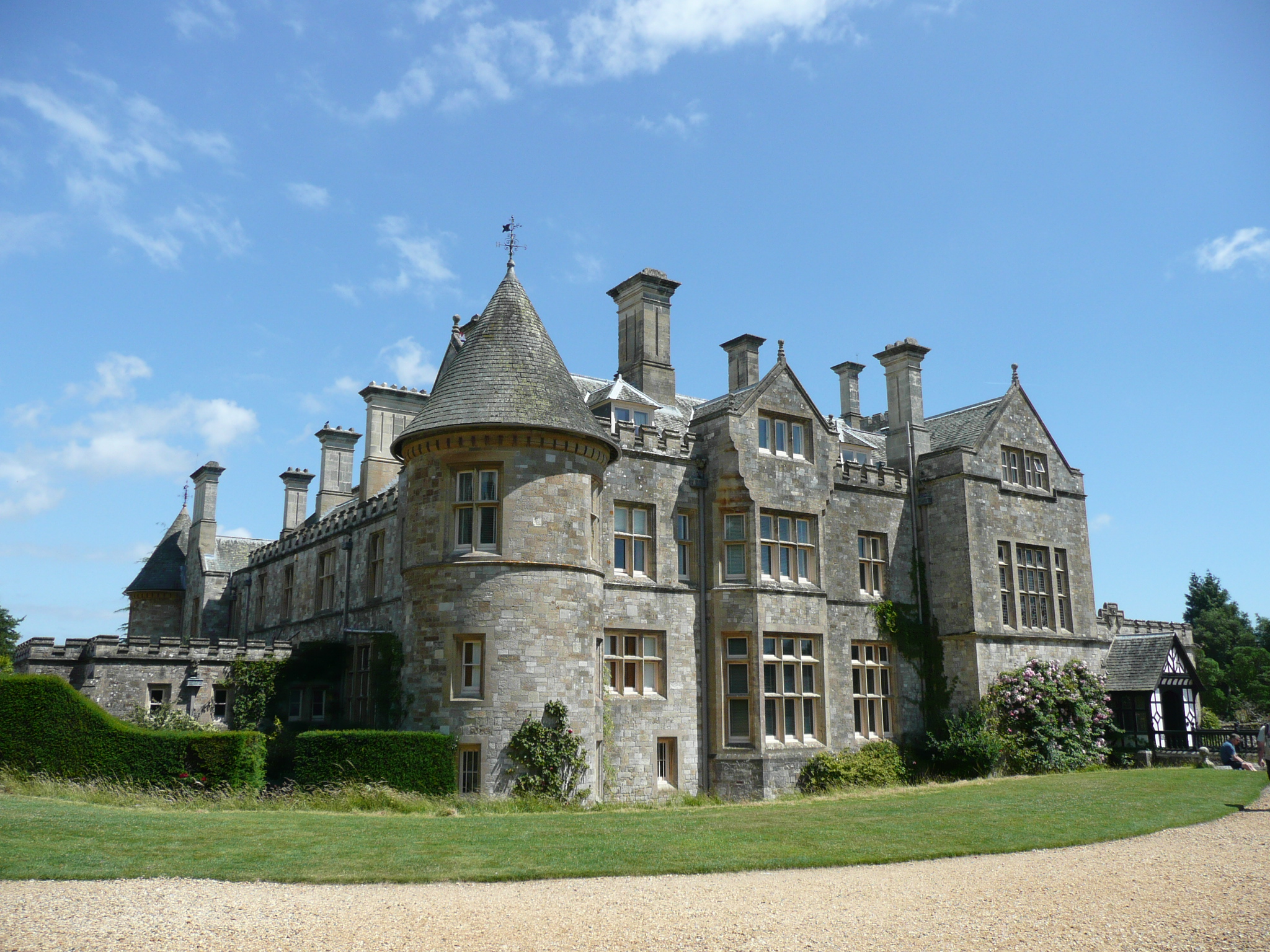
Beaulieu Palace House

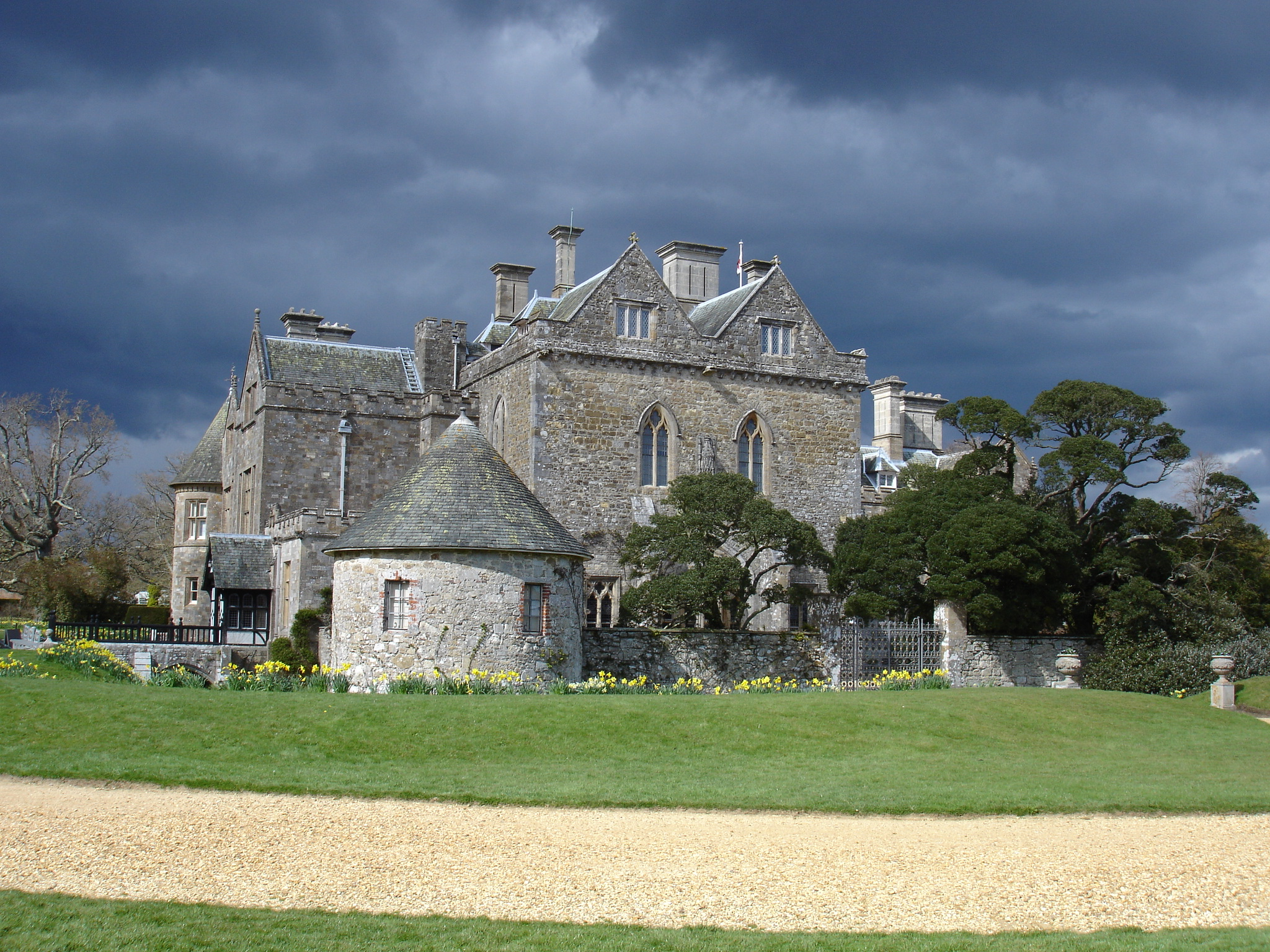

Beaulieu Palace House was originally built in the 13th century as the gatehouse of Beaulieu Abbey. Following the Dissolution of the Monasteries, the estate was purchased by Sir Thomas Wriothesley, later 1st Earl of Southampton, in 1538. The house passed through marriage into the Montagu family and is still owned by the 1st Earl's descendant, the 4th Baron Montagu of Beaulieu.

The house was extended in the 16th century, and again in the 19th century, and is today a fine example of a Gothic country house. The house overlooks Beaulieu River and is surrounded by lawns and walkways. The inside of the house has been kept in a Victorian style.

King James I stayed at six times at Beaulieu during his progresses in south-west England. Stands were built for the royal party to watch football and animal baiting. In August 1613, James gave an audience to the Venetian ambassador Antonio Foscarini at Beaulieu.

Although still home to the current Lord and Lady Montagu, parts of the house and gardens are open daily to the public. It is a member of the Treasure Houses of England consortium.

The Palace House is open to the public as part of the visitor attraction known as "Beaulieu", which includes:

- Beaulieu Abbey
- National Motor Museum
- Beaulieu Palace House
- Secret Army Exhibition – an exhibit about the Special Operations Executive training at Beaulieu during World War II
- Gardens
- A monorail
- Rides

== In film ==
The 1936 British Pathé film, Miniature Railway, (ID Number 1222.23), is a 1':40" long feature which shows (Miss.) "Mary Cook" driving the engine around the grounds.

In the film Mrs. Palfrey at the Claremont, Mrs. Palfrey takes her new young friends to see the Beaulieu Palace where she used to visit with her husband when they were first married.

== Local folklore and legend ==
Beaulieu, according to the official website, is one of the most haunted places in Britain, with reported sightings going back over a hundred years, and possibly as far as the mid-16th century. Numerous paranormal investigators have conducted research at the abbey, including Arthur Conan Doyle, who it is claimed made contact with a ghost during a séance at Palace House.

A lady in blue or grey, reportedly sighted walking through walls and making a lot of noise in the private apartments, is believed to be the ghost of the Countess of Beaulieu, Lady Isabella, who died in 1786. The smell of incense, which allegedly signals tragedy for the people of the abbey or the village, was also reported by Edward Douglas-Scott-Montagu, 3rd Baron Montagu of Beaulieu among others in a room of the Palace House used as a chapel in the Middle Ages.
