= Mary Montagu-Scott =

English designer (born 1964)

The Honourable Mary Montagu-Scott
- Born: Mary Rachel Douglas-Scott-Montagu; 16 November 1964 (age 61)
- Spouse: Rupert Scott (m. 1997)
- Children: 2
- Parent(s): Edward Douglas-Scott-Montagu, 3rd Baron Montagu of Beaulieu (father); Belinda Crossley (mother)
- Relatives: Ralph Douglas-Scott-Montagu, 4th Baron Montagu of Beaulieu (brother)

The Honourable Mary Montagu-Scott (born 16 November 1964) is the daughter of Edward Douglas-Scott-Montagu, 3rd Baron Montagu of Beaulieu (1926–2015) and his first wife Belinda Crossley.

== Early life and family ==
Hon. Mary Montagu-Scott has one sibling from her parents’ marriage, Ralph Douglas-Scott-Montagu, 4th Baron Montagu of Beaulieu. He is the current Baron Montagu of Beaulieu. Her parents divorced in 1974, and her father married his second wife, Fiona Margaret Herbert, in the same year. This marriage produced her younger half brother, Hon. Jonathan Deane Douglas-Scott-Montagu.

== Career ==
Mary Montagu-Scott trained in Theatre Design at the Central School of Art and Design, London. She set up Mary Montagu Designs, an interior design business working on many residential and commercial design projects.

She was previously the chairperson of the New Forest Heritage Centre Trust from 2012 to 2024 which runs from the New Forest Heritage Centre. She is currently a trustee of Royal Navy Museums, The Medusa Trust, HMS Victory Preservation Co, New Forest Agricultural Show Society, Vice Chair of the Maritime Archaeology Trust, and Chair of Trustees at the Buckler's Hard Shipyard Trust.

She is currently a director of Beaulieu Enterprises Ltd, Beaulieu.

She is also a patron of Oakhaven Hospice.

From April 2017 until April 2018, she served as High Sheriff of Hampshire.

She became a Deputy Lieutenant of Hampshire in 2018

== Personal life ==
Mary Montagu-Scott is married to Rupert Scott. They have two children.
