= Baron Montagu of Beaulieu =

Barony in the Peerage of the United Kingdom

Barony Montagu of Beaulieu
- Blazon: Arms: Quarterly: 1st and 4th grandquarter: quarterly: 1st and 4th, Argent three Lozenges conjoined in fess Gules within a Bordure Sable (Montagu); 2nd and 3rd, Or an Eagle displayed Vert beaked and membered Gules (Monthermer); 2nd grandquarter: Argent on a Bend Azure an Estoile between two Crescents Or (Scott); 3rd grandquarter: quarterly: 1st and 4th, Argent a Human Heart Gules imperially crowned Or on a Chief Azure three Mullets of the field (Douglas); 2nd and 3rd, Azure a Bend between six Cross Crosslets fitchy Argent (Mar), the whole within a Bordure Or charged with a Double Tressure flory counterflory; Crest: 1st: a Griffin's Head couped at the neck Or winged and beaked Sable; 2nd: a Stag trippant proper; 3rd: a Human Heart Gules imperially crowned Or between two Wings of the second; Supporters: On either side a Griffin Or winged and beaked Sable charged on the shoulder with a Cap of Maintenance Azure
- Creation date: 29 December 1885
- Created by: Queen Victoria
- Peerage: Peerage of the United Kingdom
- First holder: Lord Henry Montagu Douglas Scott
- Present holder: Ralph Douglas-Scott-Montagu, 4th Baron
- Heir presumptive: Hon. Jonathan Deane Montagu-Scott
- Remainder to: the 1st Baron's heirs male of the body lawfully begotten
- Seat: Beaulieu Palace House
- Motto: SPECTEMUR AGENDO (Let us be judged by our actions)

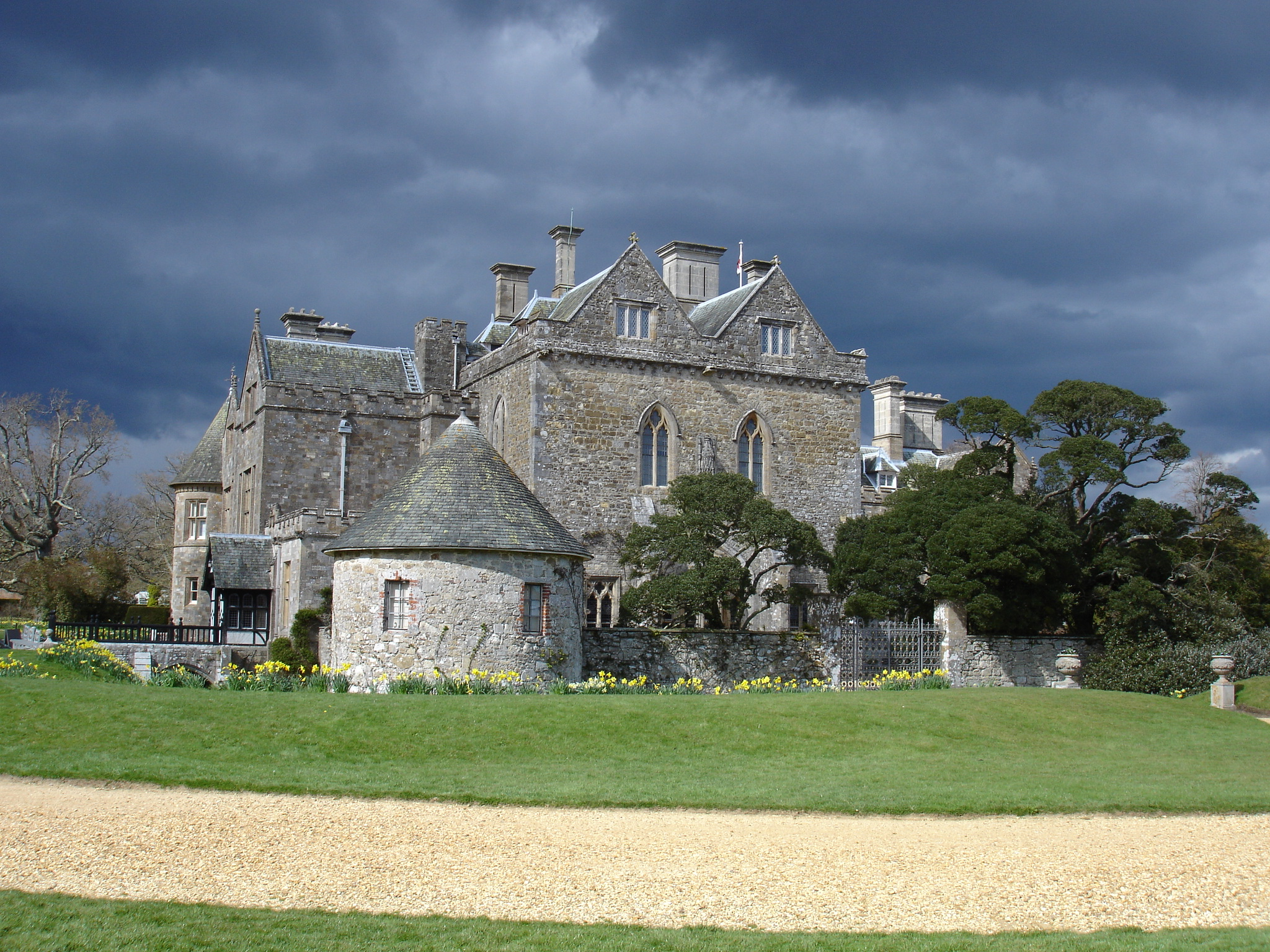
Beaulieu Palace House, the seat of the Barons Montagu of Beaulieu

Baron Montagu of Beaulieu (French pronunciation: [boljø], Engl. pronunciation: "bewley", from French beau, "beautiful" and lieu, "place"), in the County of Hampshire, is a title in the Peerage of the United Kingdom. It was created in 1885 for the Conservative politician Lord Henry Montagu Douglas Scott, who had earlier represented Selkirkshire and South Hampshire in the House of Commons. He was the second son of Walter Montagu Douglas Scott, 5th Duke of Buccleuch (see the Duke of Buccleuch for earlier history of the family). His son, the second Baron, sat as a Conservative Member of Parliament for New Forest. The 3rd Baron Montagu of Beaulieu was one of the ninety elected hereditary peers that remain in the House of Lords after the passing of the House of Lords Act 1999, and sat on the Conservative benches. As descendants of the 5th Duke of Buccleuch, the Barons Montagu of Beaulieu are also in remainder to this peerage and its subsidiary titles.

== History ==
The seat of the Barons Montagu of Beaulieu is Beaulieu Palace House in Beaulieu, Hampshire. The house, built around the gatehouse of the monastery of Beaulieu Abbey (the extensive ruins of which are a major feature of the estate), was purchased in 1538 by Thomas Wriothesley, 1st Earl of Southampton, when the abbey was dissolved by Henry VIII. The house came into the Montagu family through the marriage of Ralph Montagu, 3rd Baron Montagu, and Lady Elizabeth Wriothesley, daughter of Thomas Wriothesley, 4th Earl of Southampton.

The first title to be created in the name of Beaulieu was for Edward Hussey. He was the husband of Lady Isabella Montagu, widow of William Montagu, 2nd Duke of Manchester, and daughter of John Montagu, 2nd Duke of Montagu, and adopted the surname of Hussey-Montagu in 1749. He was created Baron Beaulieu in 1762 and Earl of Beaulieu in 1784. Both titles were in the Peerage of Great Britain, and became extinct on his death in 1802.

The representation of the Montagu family (along with that of the Douglases, Dukes of Queensberry) later passed to the Scott family, headed by the Duke of Buccleuch, through the marriage of Henry Scott, 3rd Duke of Buccleuch, to Lady Elizabeth Montagu, daughter of George Montagu, 1st Duke of Montagu (of the 1766 creation). The Scotts then adopted the surname of Montagu Douglas Scott. As mentioned above, Lord Henry Montagu Douglas Scott, second son of the fifth Duke of Buccleuch, was created Baron Montagu of Beaulieu in 1885 and thereafter changed his surname to Douglas-Scott-Montagu.

The late owner of Beaulieu and his eldest son were both featured in Lord Montagu, a documentary by Luke Korem about Edward Montagu-Scott’s life and accomplishments. The film was screened twice at the Newport Beach Film Festival in Newport Beach, California, in 2013.

== Relationship to earlier Montagu peerages ==
The title Baron Montagu of Beaulieu takes its name from the historic Montagu family, one of the oldest aristocratic families in England, whose members held a succession of peerages from the Middle Ages onwards. These included the medieval Baron Montagu, the Montagu creation of the Earldom of Salisbury, and the Dukedom of Montagu.

The earlier Montagu peerages became extinct at various points due to the failure of male heirs, most notably with the extinction of the Dukedom of Montagu in 1790. As a result, later titles incorporating the Montagu name were not continuations of those peerages but new creations within the Peerage of Great Britain or the Peerage of the United Kingdom, reflecting descent from, or association with, the historic family.

The connection between the Barony of Montagu of Beaulieu and the earlier Montagu peerages arises through descent in the female line from the Montagu dukes. Following this inheritance, the family of the Duke of Buccleuch adopted the compounded surname Montagu Douglas Scott, preserving the Montagu name despite the extinction of the original titles. The 1885 creation of the barony therefore reflects ancestral and nominal continuity rather than legal succession to any earlier Montagu peerage.

A separate peerage associated with Beaulieu had previously existed when Edward Hussey-Montagu, 1st Earl of Beaulieu was created Baron Beaulieu in 1762 and later Earl of Beaulieu in 1784, both titles being creations in the Peerage of Great Britain. Both became extinct upon his death in 1802 and are independent of, and unrelated to, the later creation of Baron Montagu of Beaulieu.

== Barons Montagu of Beaulieu (1885) ==
1. Henry John Montagu-Scott, 1st Baron Montagu of Beaulieu (1832–1905)
2. John Walter Edward Montagu-Scott, 2nd Baron Montagu of Beaulieu (1866–1929)
3. Edward John Barrington Montagu-Scott, 3rd Baron Montagu of Beaulieu (1926–2015)
4. Ralph Douglas Montagu-Scott, 4th Baron Montagu of Beaulieu (born 1961)

The heir presumptive is the present holder's half-brother, the Hon. Jonathan Deane Montagu-Scott (born 1975).

== See also ==
- Montagu Douglas Scott family
- Duke of Buccleuch
- Duke of Montagu
- Earl of Beaulieu
- National Motor Museum
- Beaulieu Abbey
